= List of covered bridges in Oregon =

This list of Oregon covered bridges contains the 51 historic covered bridges remaining in the U.S. state of Oregon.

Most covered bridges in Oregon were built between 1905 and 1925. At the height of their use, there were an estimated 450 covered bridges in Oregon, which had dwindled to 56 by 1977. As of 2021, there were only 49 remaining. Lane County has more covered bridges than any other county west of the Mississippi River. Of all states west of the Mississippi River, Oregon is the only one to have more than forty covered bridges.

== List ==
Photo	Bridge	County	Location	Built	Length (ft)	Crosses	Coordinates	Notes
Harris Bridge	Harris	Benton	Wren	1929	75	Marys River	44.5800°N 123.4602°W	NRHP
Hayden Covered Bridge	Hayden	Benton	Alsea	1918	91	Alsea River	44.3831°N 123.6307°W	NRHP
Irish Bend Bridge	Irish Bend	Benton	Corvallis	1954	60	Oak Creek	44.566535°N 123.300802°W	NRHP
Sandy Creek Bridge	Sandy Creek	Coos	Remote	1921	60	Sandy Creek	43.00637°N 123.89177°W	NRHP, footbridge
Rock O' the Range Bridge	Rock O' the Range	Deschutes	Bend	1963	42	Swalley Canal	44.12236°N 121.28691°W	NRHP, only covered bridge east of the Cascades, some consider it not to be a true covered bridge since it lacks a truss privately owned and maintained covered bridge open to the public
Cavitt Creek Covered Bridge	Cavitt Creek	Douglas	Peel	1943	70	Little River	43.24410°N 123.02177°W	Raw log upper supports with a portal shape for log truck passage
Horse Creek Covered Bridge	Horse Creek	Douglas	Myrtle Creek	1930	105	Myrtle Creek	43.02335°N 123.29004°W	Closed in 1968, dismantled 1987 and moved from 44.16212°N 122.15508°W and reconstructed in 1990, open to foot traffic in city park
Milo Academy Bridge	Milo Academy	Douglas	Milo	1962	100	South Umpqua River	42.93521°N 123.03890°W	NRHP, Current steel bridge with a wood housing and metal roof replaces a 1920 wooden truss covered bridge at same location.
Neal Lane Covered Bridge	Neal Lane	Douglas	Myrtle Creek	1939	42	South Myrtle Creek	43.01696°N 123.27452°W	Built for only $1,000. One of the shortest covered bridges in Oregon and the only Oregon covered bridge with a king post truss.
	Pass Creek	Douglas	Drain	1925	61	Pass Creek	43.66064°N 123.31659°W	A covered bridge may date back to 1906 originally at 43.66036°N 123.31521°W, closed 1981 and rebuilt nearby in 1989.
Rochester Bridge	Rochester	Douglas	3 miles (5 km) west of Sutherlin	1933	80	Calapooya Creek	43.402062°N 123.363135°W	Unusual bridge design includes eight side windows with curved tops and portals with flat arched openings.
Antelope Creek Covered Bridge	Antelope Creek	Jackson	Eagle Point	1922	58	Little Butte Creek	42.47209°N 122.80022°W	delisted from NRHP, formerly crossed Antelope Creek relisted on NRHP 2012 after further restoration
Lost Creek Bridge	Lost Creek	Jackson	Lake Creek	1919	39	Lost Creek	42.380139°N 122.579500°W	NRHP
McKee Bridge	McKee	Jackson	Ruch	1917	122	Applegate River	42.12580°N 123.07262°W (Note: Adjusted coordinate from "Archived copy". Archived from the original on June 8, 2009. to center of bridge by Google Maps satellite view)	NRHP; Howe truss, flying buttresses, open daylight windows at roofline, shingle roof; closed to vehicle traffic in 1956 due to structural concern, extensive restoration work in 1965, 1985, and 1989
Wimer Bridge	Wimer	Jackson	Wimer	1927	85	Evans Creek	42.53820°N 123.14978°W (Note: Adjusted coordinate from "Oregon Covered Bridges - Evans Creek River Covered Bridge". to center of bridge by Google Maps satellite view)	Rebuilt in 2008 after having collapsed July 6, 2003. Queenpost truss, flying buttresses, open daylight windows at roofline, wood floor. The 1927 Wimer bridge was a replacement for one originally built at the same site in 1892.
Grave Creek Covered Bridge	Grave Creek	Josephine	Sunny Valley	1920	105	Grave Creek	42.636097°N 123.377638°W	NRHP, Because of proximity to I-5, it is Oregon's most viewed covered bridge; also the only remaining covered bridge in Josephine County.
Belknap Bridge	Belknap	Lane	Rainbow	1966	120	McKenzie River	44.16803°N 122.22836°W	NRHP, fourth instance (information)
Centennial Bridge	Centennial	Lane	Cottage Grove	1987	84	Coast Fork Willamette River	43.79744°N 123.06441°W	Constructed from timbers salvaged from the Meadows and Brumbaugh bridges, which were dismantled in 1979; Bicycle and foot traffic
Chambers Bridge	Chambers Railroad	Lane	Cottage Grove	1925, replaced 2011	78	Coast Fork Willamette River	43.78937°N 123.06968°W	NRHP, no longer in service for rail traffic, Oregon's only remaining covered rail bridge.
Coyote Creek Bridge	Coyote Creek	Lane	Crow	1922	60	Coyote Creek	43.970123°N 123.318983°W	NRHP
Currin Bridge	Currin	Lane	Cottage Grove	1925	105	Row River	43.7930389°N 122.9964583°W	NRHP
Deadwood Creek Bridge	Deadwood Creek	Lane	Swisshome	1932	105	Deadwood Creek	44.14358°N 123.72042°W (Note: Adjusted coordinate from "Archived copy". Archived from the original on June 11, 2009. to center of bridge viewed by Google Maps satellite view)	NRHP; the floor is banked for turning traffic; renovated in 1986
Dorena Covered Bridge	Dorena	Lane	Dorena	1949	105	Row River	43.737623°N 122.883680°W	NRHP
Ernest Bridge	Ernest	Lane	Marcola	1938	75	Mohawk River	44.201515°N 122.836471°W	NRHP (misspelled by the USGS as "Earnest Bridge")
Goodpasture Bridge	Goodpasture	Lane	Vida	1938	165	McKenzie River	44°8′53″N 122°35′15″W	NRHP
Lake Creek Bridge	Lake Creek (Nelson Mountain)	Lane	Greenleaf	1925	105	Lake Creek	44.104333°N 123.673639°W	NRHP; also called Nelson Mountain Bridge, rehabilitated 1984 with concrete floor
Lowell Bridge	Lowell	Lane	Lowell	1945	165	Middle Fork Willamette River	43.909570°N 122.779515°W	NRHP, replacement for a bridge built in 1907
Mosby Creek Covered Bridge	Mosby Creek	Lane	Cottage Grove	1920	90	Mosby Creek	43.77817°N 123.00480°W	NRHP, rehabilitated 2002
Office Bridge	Office	Lane	Westfir	1944	180	North Fork Middle Fork Willamette River	43.75847°N 122.49571°W	NRHP
Parvin Bridge	Parvin Bridge	Lane	Dexter	1921	75	Lost Creek	43°53′58.0″N 122°49′22.8″W	NRHP
Pengra Bridge	Pengra Bridge	Lane	Jasper	1938	120	Fall Creek	43.966515°N 122.842576°W	NRHP
Stewart Bridge	Stewart	Lane	Walden	1930	60	Mosby Creek	43.76601°N 122.99415°W	NRHP
Unity Bridge	Unity	Lane	Lowell	1936	90	Fall Creek	43.945126°N 122.775627°W	NRHP
Wendling Bridge	Wendling	Lane	Wendling	1938	60	Mill Creek	44.19133°N 122.79879°W (Note: Coordinate obtained from "Archived copy". Archived from the original on June 11, 2009. and adjusted to center of bridge per Google satellite image)	NRHP
Wildcat Creek Bridge	Wildcat Creek	Lane	Walton	1925	75	Wildcat Creek	44°0′13″N 123°39′9″W	NRHP
Chitwood Covered Bridge	Chitwood	Lincoln	Chitwood	1926	96	Yaquina River	44.65423°N 123.81767°W (Note: Coordinate obtained from "Archived copy". Archived from the original on June 11, 2009. and adjusted to center of bridge per Google satellite image)	NRHP
Drift Creek Covered Bridge, 2013	Drift Creek	Lincoln	Rose Lodge	1914?	66	Bear Creek	44.992888°N 123.887613°W	Delisted from the NRHP. By tradition, the oldest covered span in Oregon. (Note: Based on descriptions at http://www.oregon.gov/ODOT/HWY/GEOENVIRONMENTAL/historic_bridges_covered1.shtml and http://www.oregon.com/covered_bridges/bridges/bear_creek.cfm, the Drift Creek Covered Bridge was originally located at 44.91246°N 124.00453°W) Because of severe structural problems, the bridge was dismantled and removed from its original location in the fall of 1997 and reconstructed on private property near Otis.
Fisher School	Fisher School	Lincoln	Fisher	1919	72	Five Rivers	44.29164°N 123.84139°W (Note: "Archived copy". Archived from the original on June 9, 2009. adjusted to center Google satellite image)	NRHP, also known as Five Rivers Covered Bridge
North Fork Yachats River Bridge	North Fork Yachats	Lincoln	Yachats (vicinity)	1938	42	North Fork Yachats River	44.31000°N 123.96972°W	NRHP
Crawfordsville Covered Bridge	Crawfordsville	Linn	Crawfordsville	1932	105	Calapooia River	44.356791°N 122.860919°W	NRHP, also known as Calapooia River Bridge
Gilkey Bridge	Gilkey	Linn	Crabtree	1939	120	Thomas Creek	44.68786°N 122.90343°W	NRHP, aka Thomas Creek Bridge, Thomas Creek-Gilkey Covered Bridge
Hannah Bridge	Hannah	Linn	Scio	1936	105	Thomas Creek	44.712067°N 122.718420°W	NRHP, Howe truss; also known as Thomas Creek Bridge Named in honor of John Joseph Hannah, an early settler.
Hoffman Bridge	Hoffman	Linn	Crabtree	1936	90	Crabtree Creek	44.653332°N 122.890419°W	NRHP, aka Crabtree Creek-Hoffman Covered Bridge
Larwood Covered Bridge	Larwood	Linn	Crabtree	1939	105	Crabtree Creek	44.630678°N 122.740921°W	NRHP; located at the confluence of Roaring River and Crabtree Creek
Shimanek Bridge	Shimanek	Linn	Scio	1966	105	Thomas Creek	44.715673°N 122.804398°W	NRHP, aka Thomas Creek-Shimanek Covered Bridge
Short Bridge	Short	Linn	Cascadia	1945	105	South Santiam River	44.391792°N 122.510082°W	NRHP; originally named Whiskey Butte Bridge for nearby Whiskey Butte, later renamed for long-term area resident, Gordon Short. Also known as South Fork Santiam River Bridge; Howe truss
Weddle Bridge	Weddle	Linn	Sweet Home	1937	120	Ames Creek	44.394602°N 122.726623°W	placed in storage in 1987, rebuilt 1990 at the Cascade Forest Resource Center, in Sweet Home; originally located on Kelly County Road over Thomas Creek near Crabtree, possibly at 44°41′24″N 122°56′22″W
Gallon House Bridge	Gallon House	Marion		1917	84	Abiqua Creek	45.03215°N 122.79814°W	NRHP
Jordan Bridge	Jordan	Marion (originally Linn)	Stayton	1998 (1937)	90	Salem Power Canal off the North Santiam River	44.797622°N 122.767033°W	A housed Howe truss, originally located on Jordan County Road near Lyons. It was moved in 1988 to a city park in Stayton. The Jordan Bridge was one of Linn County's seven distinctive covered bridges with large side openings before its move to Marion County.
Cedar Crossing Covered Bridge	Cedar Crossing	Multnomah	Portland	1982	60	Johnson Creek	45.47207°N 122.52381°W	Only covered bridge in Multnomah County, Oregon's most populous county
Ritner Creek Bridge	Ritner Creek	Polk	Pedee	1927	73	Ritner Creek	44.727897°N 123.442048°W	NRHP, Removed from service in 1976 and was the last covered bridge on a state highway in Oregon.

== Preservation efforts ==
In 2008, The National Historic Covered Bridge Preservation Program, administered by the Federal Highway Administration, awarded grants for rehabilitation of seven covered bridges in Oregon.

2008 National Historic Covered Bridge Preservation Program for Oregon
Bridge	Grant
Chambers Railroad Bridge	$1,315,370
Chitwood Covered Bridge	$1,076,760
N. Fk. Yachats River Covered Bridge	$596,704
Gallon House Covered Bridge	$51,147
Nelson Mountain Covered Bridge	$17,946
Mosby Creek (Layng) Covered Bridge	$17,946
Pengra Covered Bridge	$17,946
Total	$3,093,819

== Gallery ==
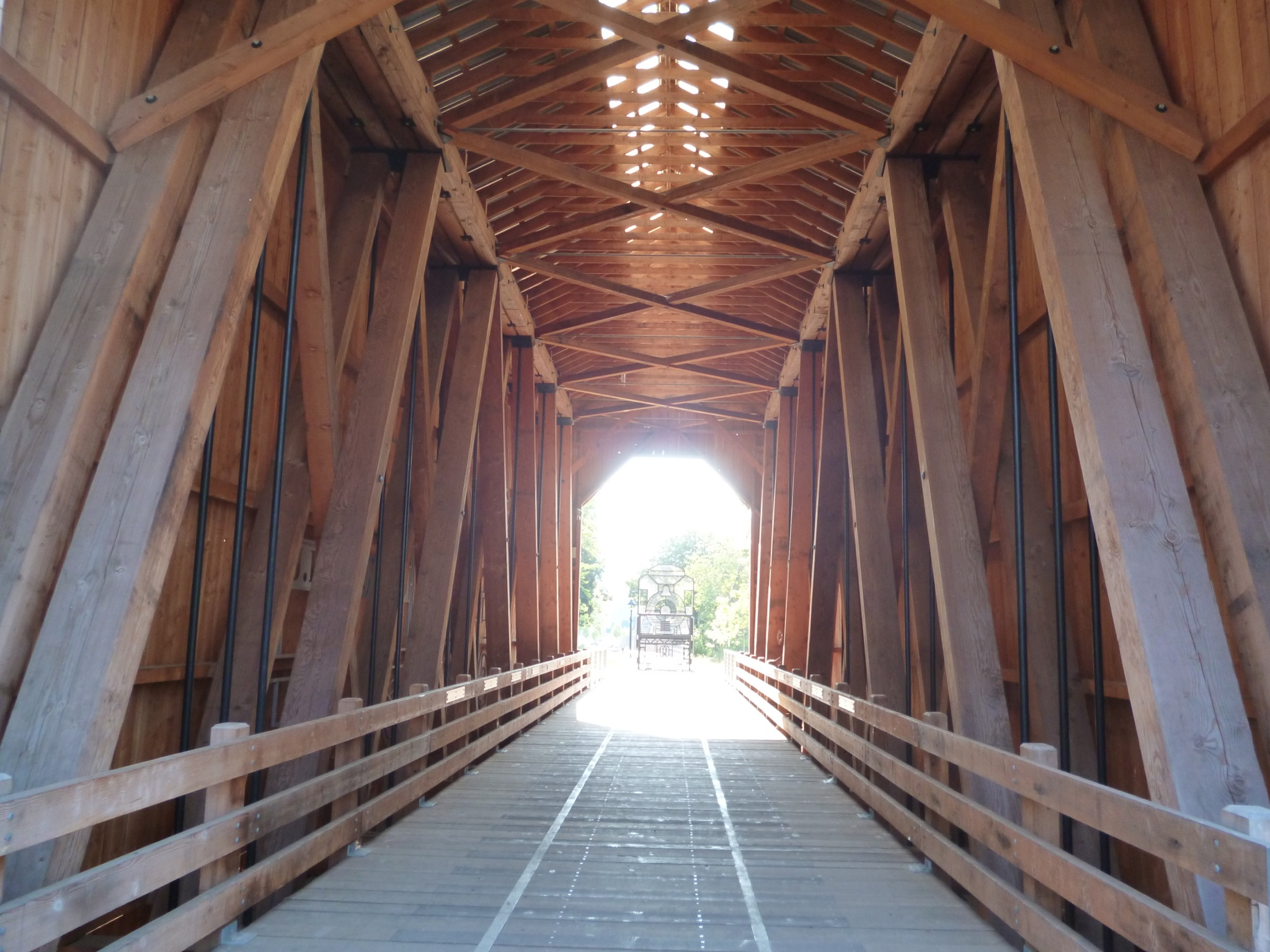
Chambers Bridge Howe truss

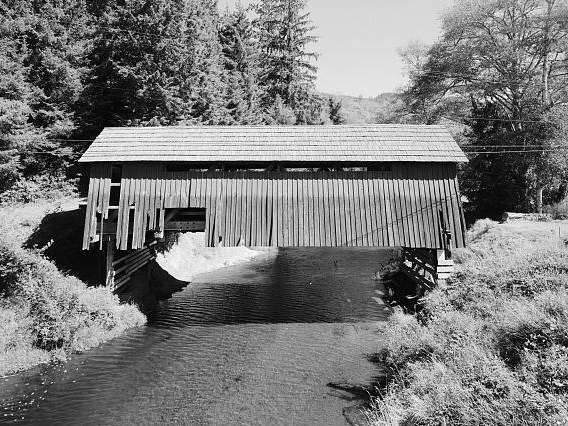
Drift Creek Covered Bridge

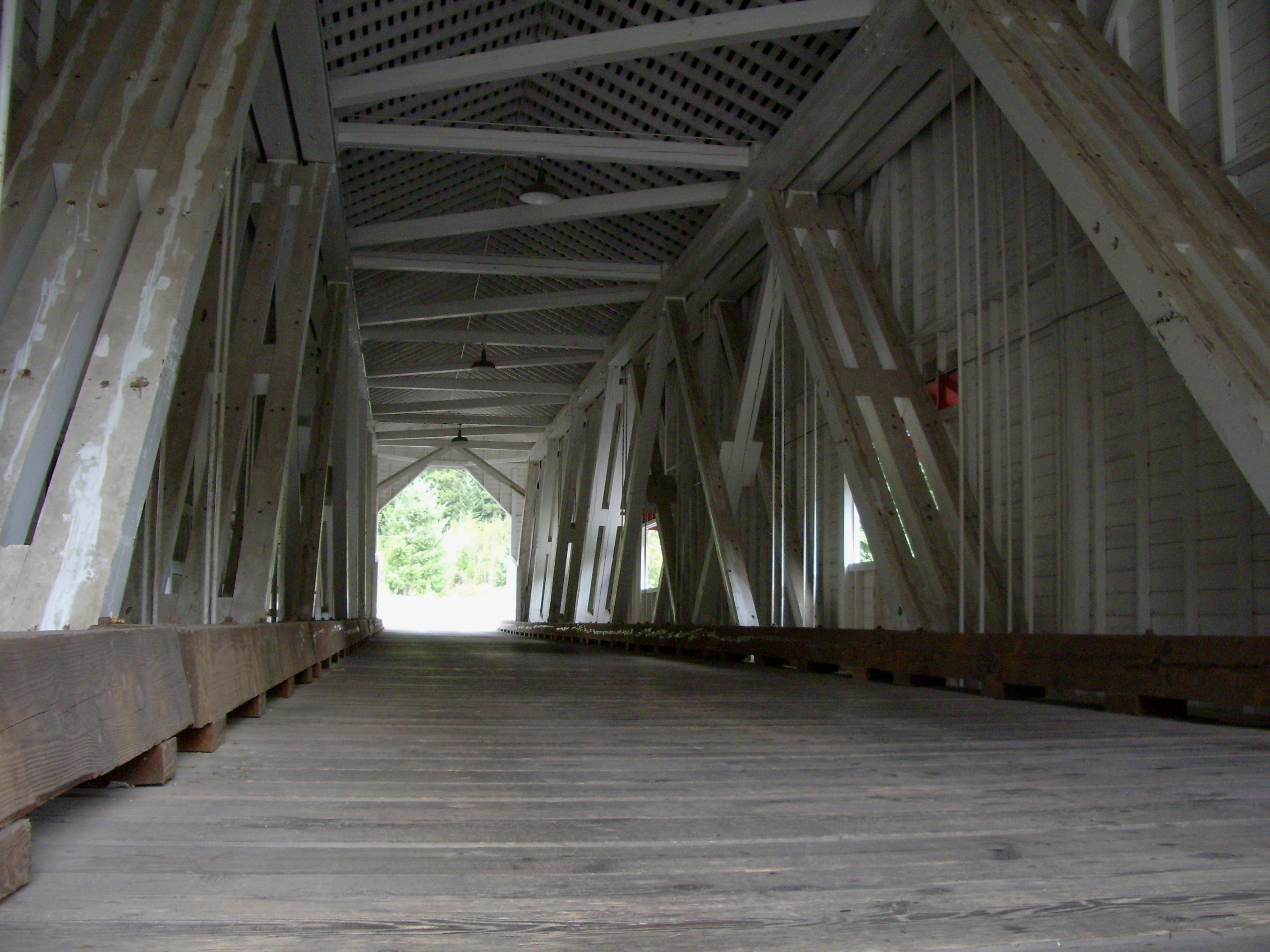
Office Bridge interior

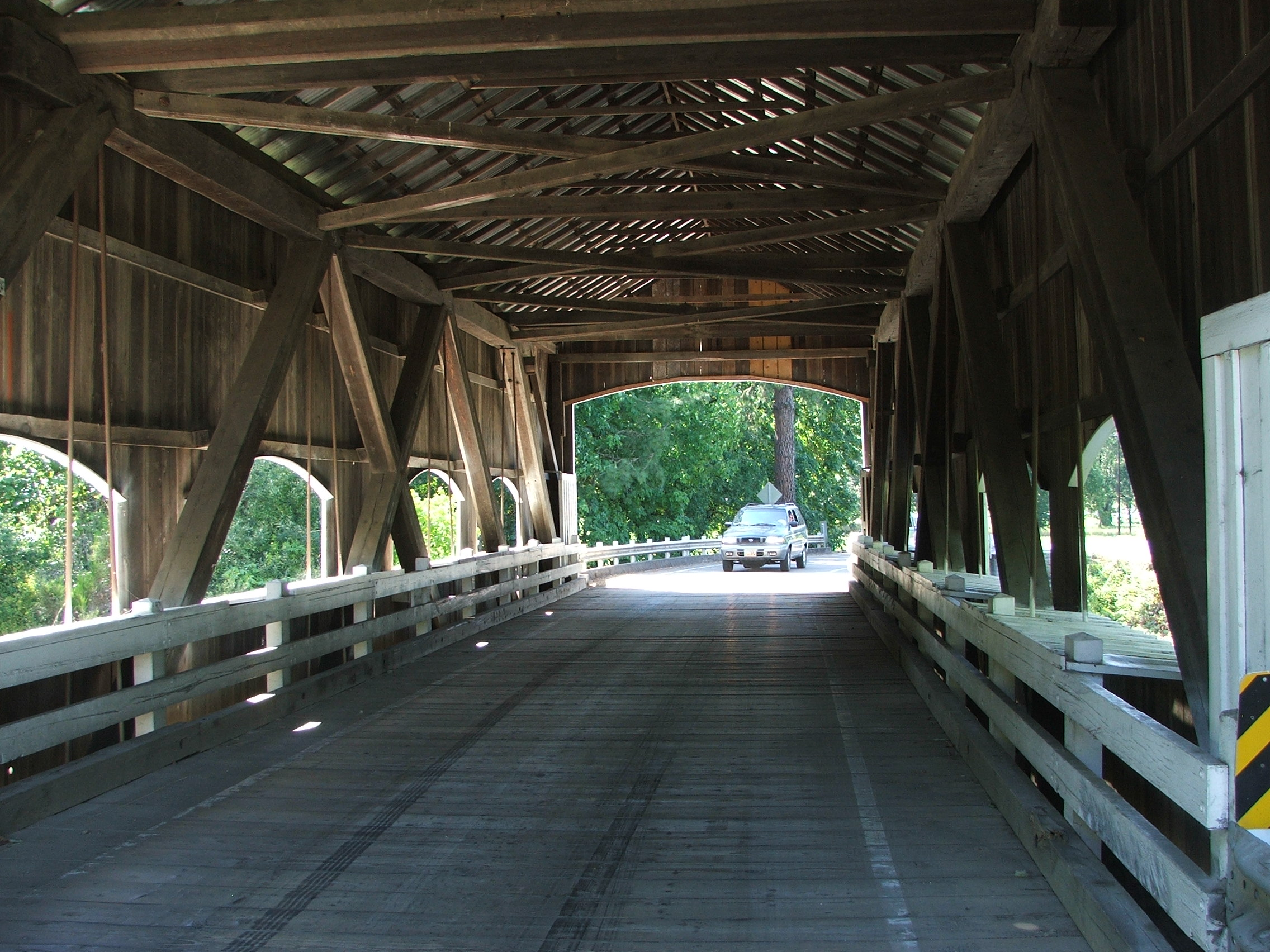
Rochester Bridge interior

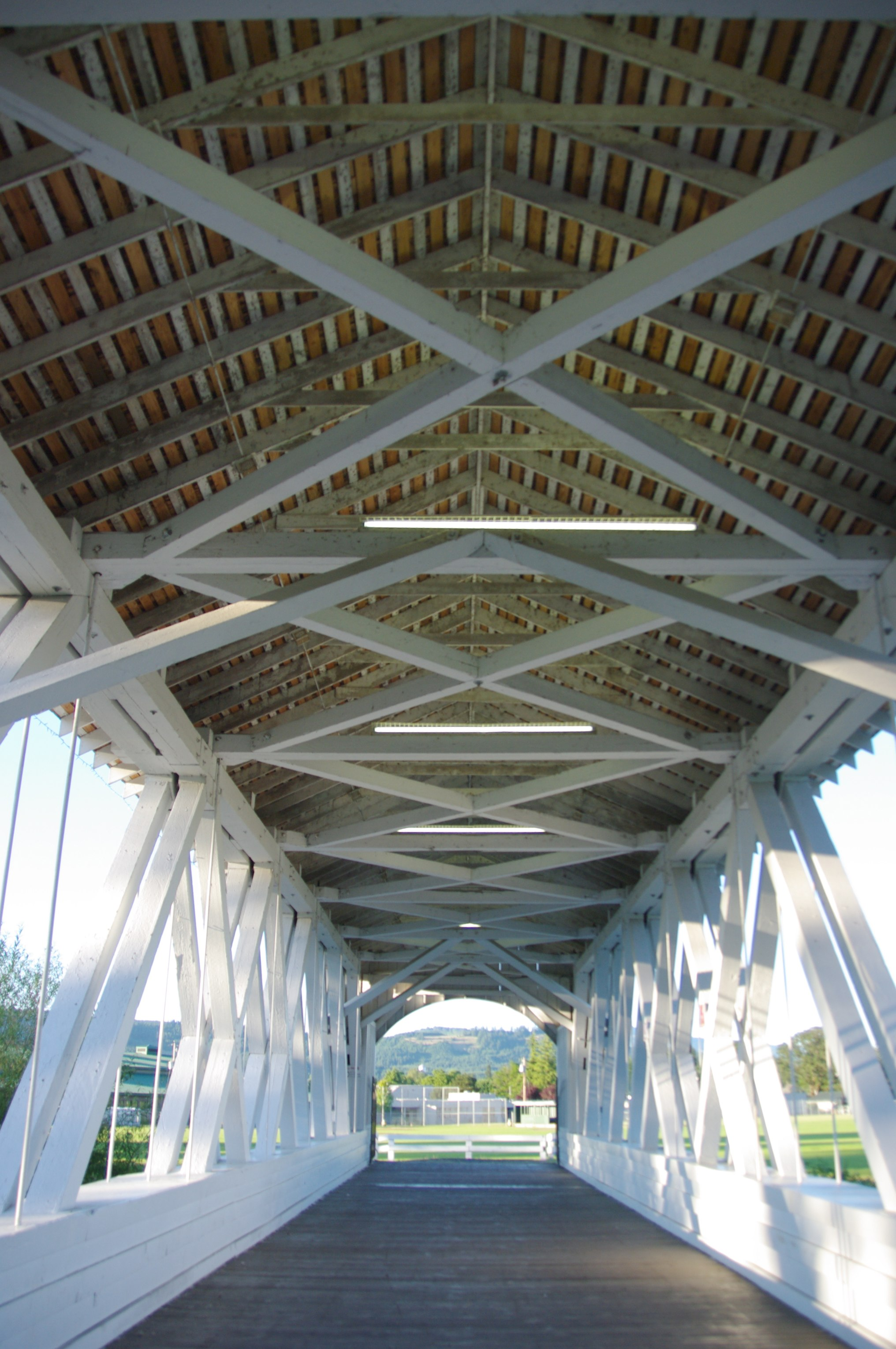
Weddle Bridge interior

== See also ==
- List of bridges on the National Register of Historic Places in Oregon
- Lists of Oregon-related topics
