= Larwood Bridge =

Covered bridge in Oregon, US

- U.S. National Register of Historic Places
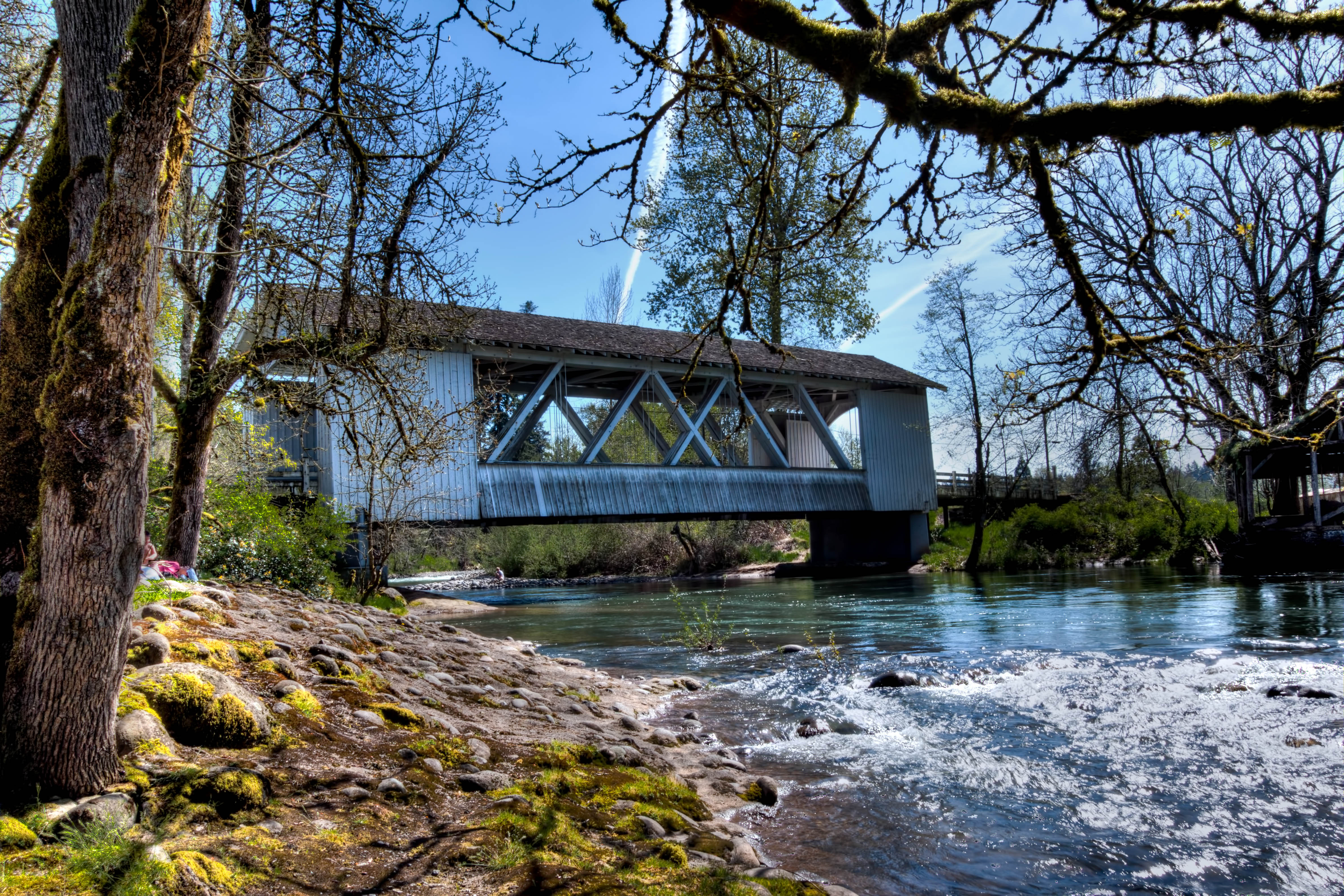
- Larwood Bridge over Crabtree Creek

- Location within Oregon Location within the United States
- Coordinates: 44°37′49.1″N 122°44′26.8″W
- Area: 7,500 square feet (700 m^{2})
- Built: 1939
- Architectural style: Howe truss
- NRHP reference No.: 79003733
- Listed: November 29, 1979

The Larwood Bridge is a covered bridge near Lacomb in Linn County in the U.S. state of Oregon. It was added to the National Register of Historic Places in 1979.

The bridge crosses Crabtree Creek at Larwood Wayside Park, where the Roaring River empties into the creek, about 3 miles (5 km) north of Lacomb. The 105-foot (32 m) bridge carries Fish Hatchery Road over the creek.

Built in 1939, the bridge was repaired in 2002. It was named after William Larwood, who settled here in 1888, built a store and blacksmith shop, and operated a post office. The bridge had two predecessors, one over the creek and another over the river, adjacent to one another. Both no longer exist.

== See also ==
- List of bridges documented by the Historic American Engineering Record in Oregon
- List of bridges on the National Register of Historic Places in Oregon
- List of Oregon covered bridges
