= Crabtree Creek (South Santiam River tributary) =

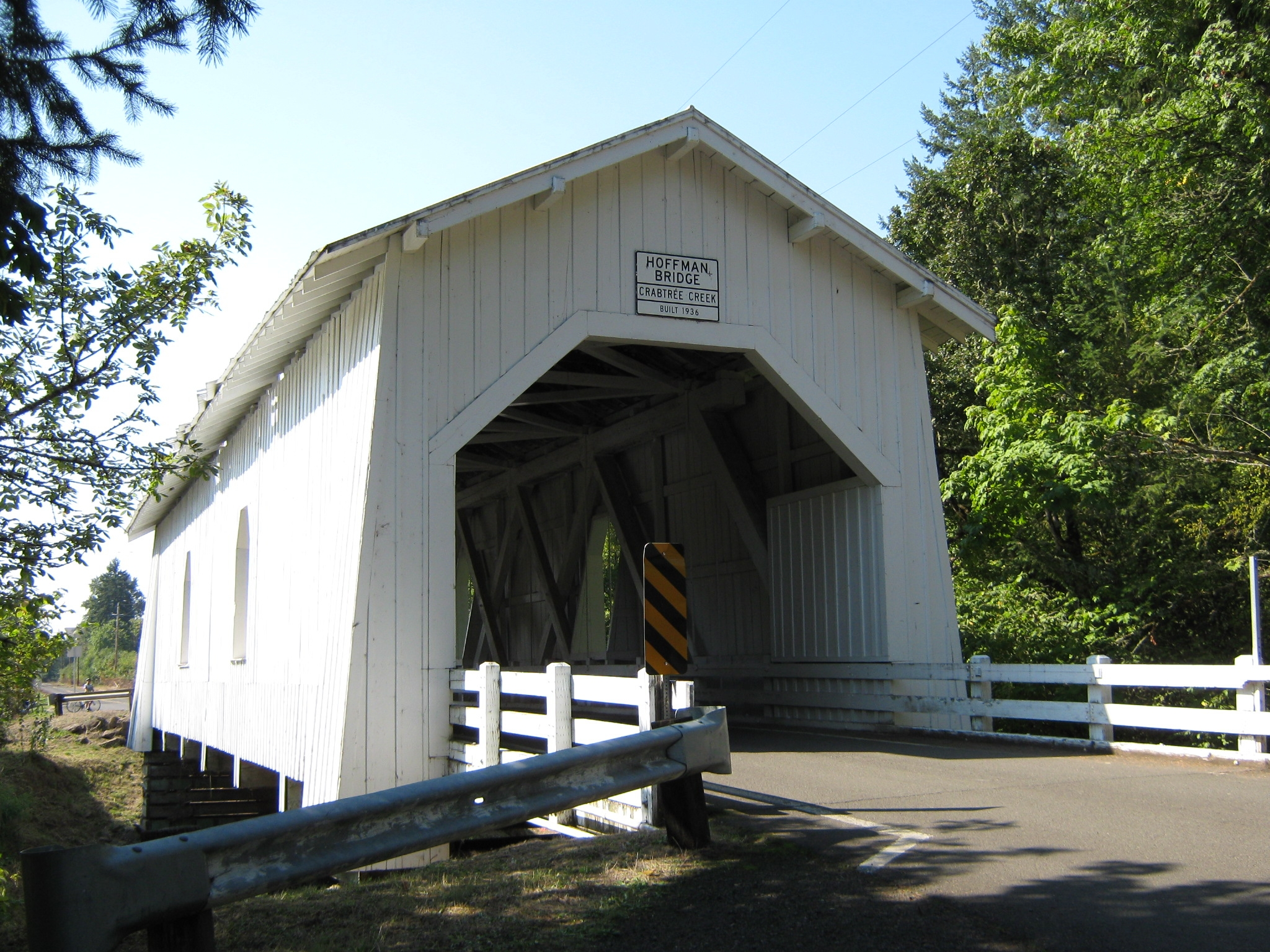
- Hoffman Bridge over Crabtree Creek

- Location of the mouth of Crabtree Creek in Oregon
- Etymology: John J. Crabtree, who settled near the mouth of the creek in 1846

Location
- Country: United States
- State: Oregon
- County: Linn

Physical characteristics
- Source: Cascade Range foothills
  - location: Crabtree Mountain and Lake
  - coordinates: 44°36′01″N 122°27′06″W
  - elevation: 4,113 ft (1,254 m)
- Mouth: South Santiam River
  - location: upstream of Jefferson
  - coordinates: 44°40′31″N 122°57′32″W
  - elevation: 236 ft (72 m)
- Basin size: 156 sq mi (400 km^{2})

Crabtree Creek is a tributary of the South Santiam River in Linn County in the U.S. state of Oregon. It begins in the western foothills of the Cascade Range at Crabtree Mountain near Crabtree Lake. From there it flows generally west to meet the larger stream about 3 miles (5 km) upstream of where the South Santiam merges with the North Santiam River to form the Santiam River.

Oregon Route 226 crosses the creek between Crabtree on the south and Scio on the north about 8 miles (13 km) from the mouth. The unincorporated community of Lacomb lies south of the creek, along one of its tributaries slightly west of the Cascade foothills.

== Bridges ==
In addition to the Route 226 bridge, the creek flows under two covered bridges. Larwood Bridge carries Fish Hatchery Road over the creek at Larwood Wayside Park, about 3 miles (5 km) north of Lacomb and 16 miles (26 km) by water from the creek mouth. Further downstream, Hoffman Bridge carries Hungry Hill Drive over the creek about a mile north of Crabtree and 5 miles (8 km) from the mouth.

== Recreation ==
Larwood Park lies at the confluence of Roaring River with Crabtree Creek about 16 miles (26 km) by water from the creek mouth. Covering 6 acres (2.4 ha), it has picnic tables, river views, a footbridge, a waterwheel that formerly powered a mill at the site, as well as places to fish and swim. Ripley's Believe It or Not! once listed the confluence as the only one in the world where a stream named "river" emptied into a stream named "creek". This was, however, incorrect. Fall River is a tributary of Clear Creek in Colorado.

Fishing for wild cutthroat trout in the creek is permitted on a catch-and-release basis; fishing for steelhead is not allowed. The creek is not stocked with hatchery fish.

Whitewater enthusiasts sometimes run parts of Crabtree Creek in kayaks or other craft. A 10-mile (16 km) run from the North Fork Bridge to Larwood Park, is rated class 3T or 4 (intermediate or advanced) on the International Scale of River Difficulty. The 15.5-mile (24.9 km) run below that is less difficult. Hazards include rocks, logs, overhanging limbs, and a dangerous barbed-wire fence across most of the river a few miles downstream of the Route 226 bridge.

== Tributaries ==
Named tributaries from source to mouth are Bonnie, White Rock, Dorgan, South Fork Crabtree, and Bald Peter creeks, all from the left; Rock Creek from the right; Green Mountain Creek from the left; Hunter and Church creeks, Roaring River, all from the right, and Beaver Creek, from the left.

== See also ==
- List of covered bridges in Oregon
- List of rivers of Oregon
