= Hoffman Bridge =

Covered bridge in Oregon, US

- Crabtree Creek – Hoffman Covered Bridge
- U.S. National Register of Historic Places
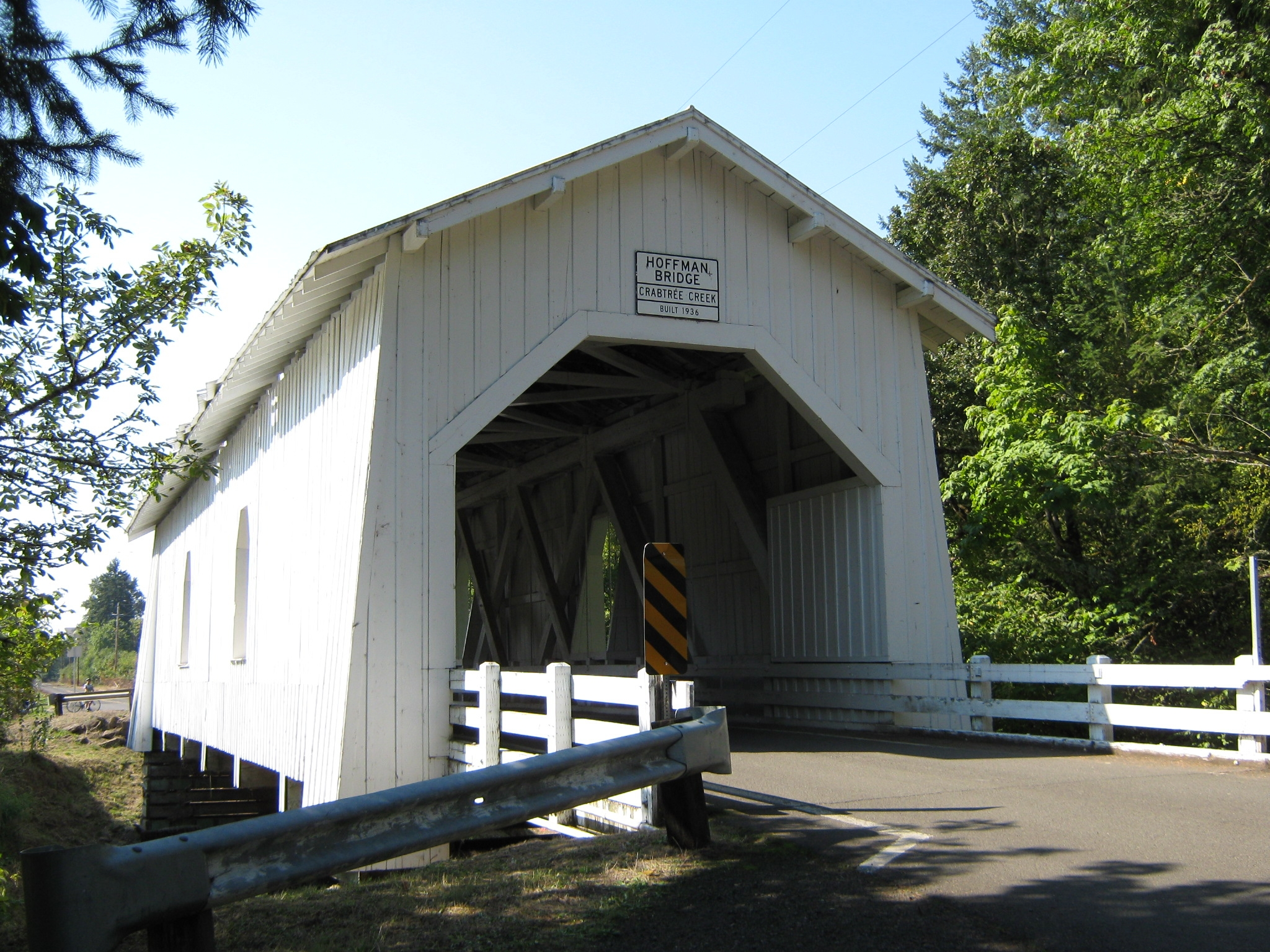
- Hoffman Bridge over Crabtree Creek

- Location within Oregon Location within the United States
- Coordinates: 44°39′11.8″N 122°53′25.2″W
- Built: 1936
- Architectural style: Howe truss
- MPS: Oregon Covered Bridges TR
- NRHP reference No.: 87000017
- Listed: February 17, 1987

The Hoffman Bridge is a covered bridge near Crabtree in Linn County in the U.S. state of Oregon. It was added to the National Register of Historic Places as Crabtree Creek – Hoffman Covered Bridge in 1987.

The bridge crosses Crabtree Creek about 1 mile (1.6 km) northeast of Crabtree. Hungry Hill Drive crosses the 90-foot (27 m) bridge.

Constructed in 1936, the bridge was named after its builder, Lee Hoffman. The creek and the nearby community were named after John Crabtree, who settled there in 1845.

== See also ==
- List of bridges on the National Register of Historic Places in Oregon
- List of Oregon covered bridges
