= Roaring River (Crabtree Creek tributary) =

- Location of the mouth of Roaring River in Oregon

Location
- Country: United States
- State: Oregon
- County: Linn

Physical characteristics
- Source: Cascade Range foothills
  - location: near Snow Peak
  - coordinates: 44°38′56″N 122°37′03″W
  - elevation: 3,104 ft (946 m)
- Mouth: Crabtree Creek
  - location: Larwood Wayside Park
  - coordinates: 44°37′48″N 122°44′24″W
  - elevation: 443 ft (135 m)
- Length: 8 mi (13 km)

Roaring River is a tributary of Crabtree Creek in Linn County in the U.S. state of Oregon. It begins in the western foothills of the Cascade Range near Snow Peak. From there it flows generally west to meet Crabtree Creek at Larwood Wayside Park, north of Lacomb, about 16 miles (26 km) upstream of where the creek meets the South Santiam River east of Albany. The only named tributary of Roaring River is Milky Fork, which enters from the left near Roaring River Park.

== Recreation ==
Larwood Wayside Park lies at the confluence of Roaring River with Crabtree Creek. Covering 6 acres (2.4 ha), it has picnic tables, river views, a footbridge, a waterwheel that formerly powered a mill at the site, as well as places to fish and swim. Ripley's Believe It or Not once listed the confluence as the only one in the world where a stream named "river" emptied into a stream named "creek".

Further upstream, Roaring River County Park is a 28-acre (11 ha) park along Fish Hatchery Drive east of Crabtree. Amenities include group picnic shelters, hiking trails, and a fishing pond. Fishing for wild cutthroat trout in the creek is permitted on a catch-and-release basis. Fishing in the park pond is recommended "for youngsters only."

Roaring River Fish Hatchery, established in 1924, raises rainbow trout and summer and winter steelhead (an anadromous form of rainbow trout). Open to the public, the hatchery has interpretive signs near the hatchery ponds.

== See also ==
- List of rivers of Oregon
