= Umpqua, Oregon =

Unincorporated community in the state of Oregon, United States

- Unincorporated community
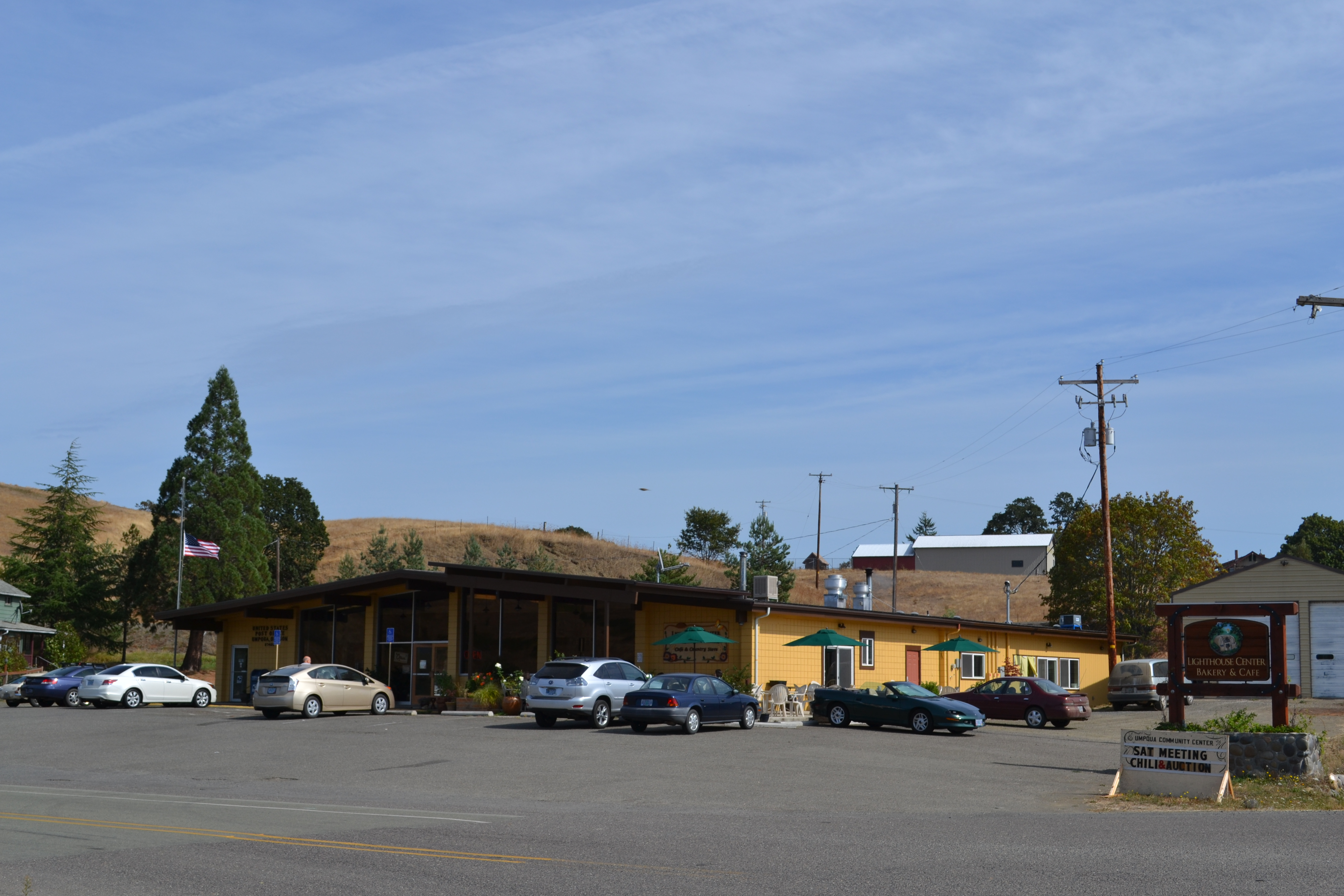
- Building housing the Umpqua Post Office

- Location within Oregon Location within the United States
- Coordinates: 43°21′55″N 123°28′06″W
- Country: United States
- State: Oregon
- County: Douglas
- Established: 1888

Area
  - Total: 0.73 sq mi (1.9 km^{2})
  - Land: 0.69 sq mi (1.8 km^{2})
  - Water: 0.039 sq mi (0.1 km^{2})
- Elevation: 322 ft (98 m)

Population (2000)
  - Total: 112
  - Density: 34/sq mi (13.2/km^{2})
- Time zone: UTC-8 (Pacific)
  - Summer (DST): UTC-7 (Pacific)
- ZIP code: 97486
- Area code: 541
- FIPS code: 41-54000
- GNIS feature ID: 1128405

Umpqua is an unincorporated community in Douglas County, in the U.S. state of Oregon. The population was 112 at the 2000 census.

The community lies west of Sutherlin at the confluence of Calapooya Creek with the Umpqua River.

The word "Umpqua" was first used by the local Native Americans to refer to the locality around the Umpqua River and came to be applied to the river as well.
