= Weddle Bridge =

Covered bridge in Oregon, US

- Formerly listed on the U.S. National Register of Historic Places
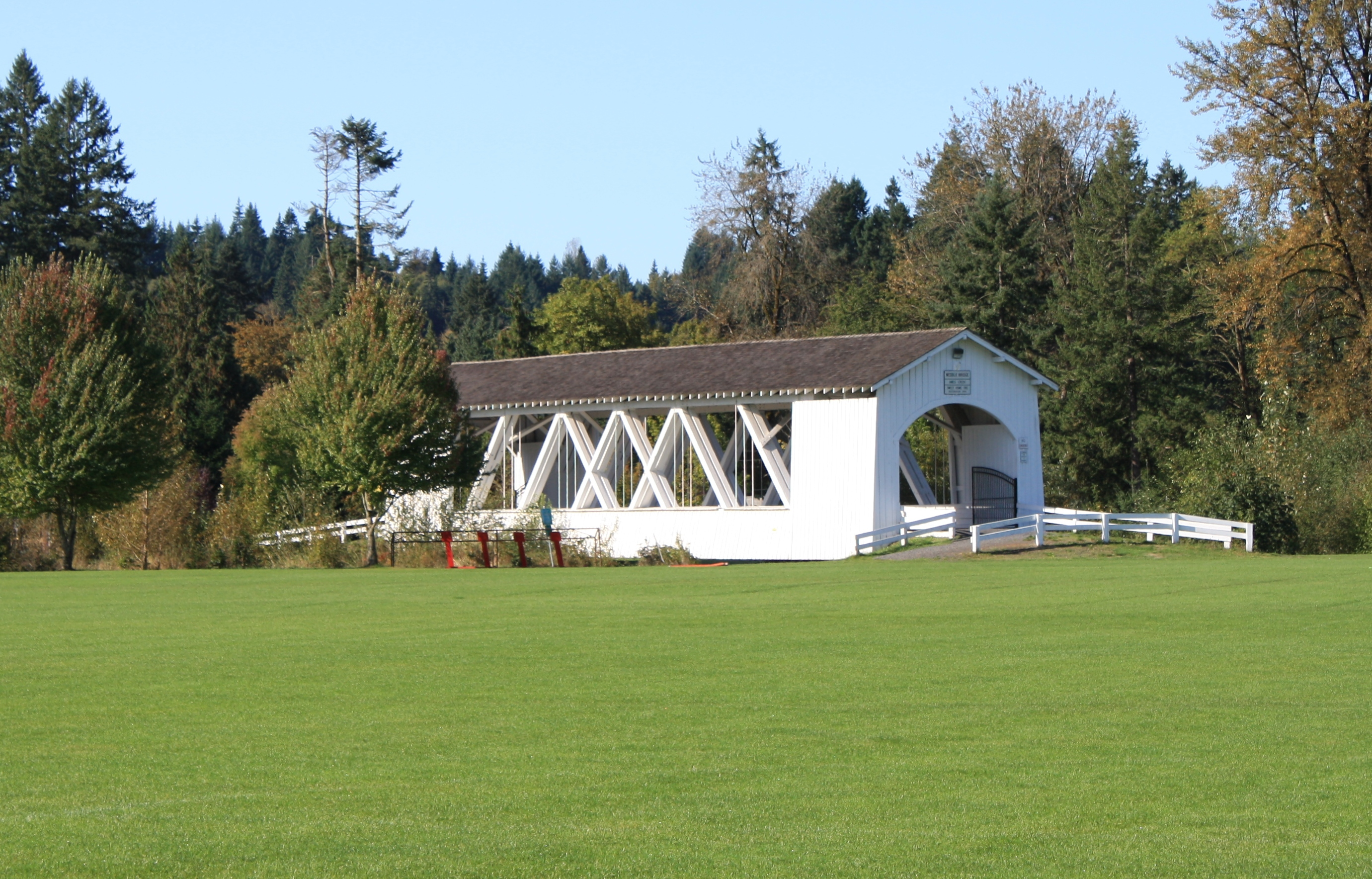
- Weddle Covered Bridge

- Location within Oregon Location within the United States
- Location: Sweet Home, Oregon, United States
- Coordinates: 44°23′35″N 122°43′39″W
- Built: 1937 (1990)
- Architectural style: Howe truss
- MPS: Oregon Covered Bridges TR
- NRHP reference No.: 79002114

Significant dates
- Added to NRHP: November 29, 1979
- Removed from NRHP: January 11, 1989

The Weddle Bridge is a 120-foot (37 m) long wooden covered bridge in Sweet Home, Oregon, United States. The bridge originally spanned Thomas Creek near Scio but was replaced by a concrete bridge in 1980 and was scheduled to be destroyed in 1987. To save the bridge, local activists staged protests and persuaded former Oregon Senator Mae Yih to help save the bridge. The Oregon Legislative Assembly soon approved the Oregon Covered Bridge Program, which helped pay for covered bridge rehabilitation projects statewide. The Weddle Bridge was the first to receive grants from the program.

In 1989, using grant funds as well as funds from local residents, a Sweet Home group called the Cascade Forest Resource Center rebuilt the Weddle Bridge across Ames Creek in Sankey Park. Also assisting in the project were the Covered Bridge Society of Oregon, which raised additional funds, and the Jordan Bridge Company, which had built the Jordan Bridge in Stayton.

The bridge was temporarily closed in 2005 after an engineering inspection determined that repairs were necessary. Proceeds from the Oregon Jamboree country music festival and donations of cash or building materials from several businesses and individuals made the repairs possible. The bridge has been used for public events such as fundraisers for breast-cancer detection and related services or for private events such as weddings.

The original bridge over Thomas Creek was named for a farmer who lived nearby, but it was also known as the Devaney Bridge for another early resident. Similar in design to other covered bridges along Thomas Creek, the Weddle Bridge featured a Howe truss, segmented portal arches, large side openings, and white board-and-batten siding.

== See also ==
- List of bridges on the National Register of Historic Places in Oregon
- List of covered bridges in Oregon
