= Elkhorn Creek (Marion County, Oregon) =

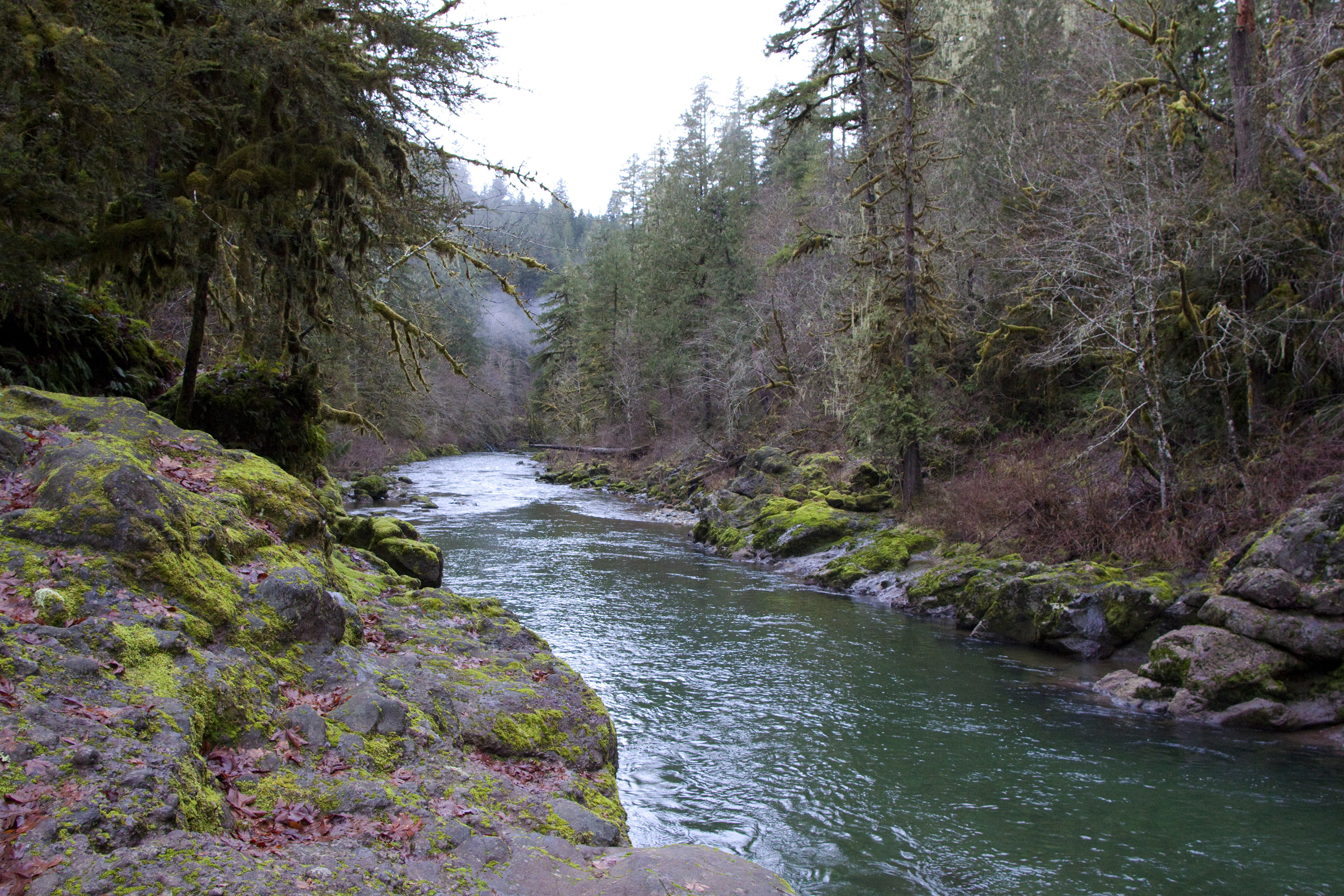
- Along the creek in Marion County

Location
- Country: United States
- Location: Marion County, Oregon

Physical characteristics
- Source
  - location: Willamette National Forest, north of Big Cliff Reservoir
  - coordinates: 44.788178°N 122.271745°W
  - elevation: 3,711 feet (1,131 m)
- Mouth
  - location: Little North Santiam River
  - coordinates: 44.818178°N 122.392026°W
  - elevation: 1,070 feet (330 m)
- Length: 7.6 mi (12.2 km)

Basin features
- Progression: Mostly west
- Tributaries
  - left: Big Twelve Creek, Buckhorn Creek, Buck Creek

National Wild and Scenic Rivers System
- Type: Wild, Scenic
- Designated: September 30, 1996

Elkhorn Creek is a 7.6-mile (12 km) long stream in Marion County, Oregon, United States. Its source is on the northern edge of the Willamette National Forest, about 3.5 miles (5.6 km) north of Big Cliff Reservoir. The creek flows mostly west, receiving Big Twelve Creek, Buckhorn Creek, and Buck Creek all from the south, and it enters the Little North Santiam River just south of Elkhorn Woods Park, about 5 miles (8.0 km) north of the city of Gates. The stream's valley is surrounded by the western Cascade foothills, covered with coniferous trees characteristic of the Pacific Northwest, and lined with red alders at the water's edge. The creek supports runs of rainbow and coastal cutthroat trout, as well as Pacific giant salamanders. On September 30, 1996, a 6.4-mile (10.3 km) portion of the stream, from the mouth nearly to the source, was protected as part of the National Wild and Scenic Rivers System.

In 2011 and 2012, the Bureau of Land Management (BLM) performed a restoration project to improve habitat for chinook salmon and rainbow trout to spawn. The BLM placed logs in the lower section of Elkhorn Creek to slow its flow, and planted trees beside the creek to shade and cool the water and to provide future sources of wood for naturally fallen logs to repeat the process.

== See also ==
- List of rivers of Oregon
