= Little North Santiam River =

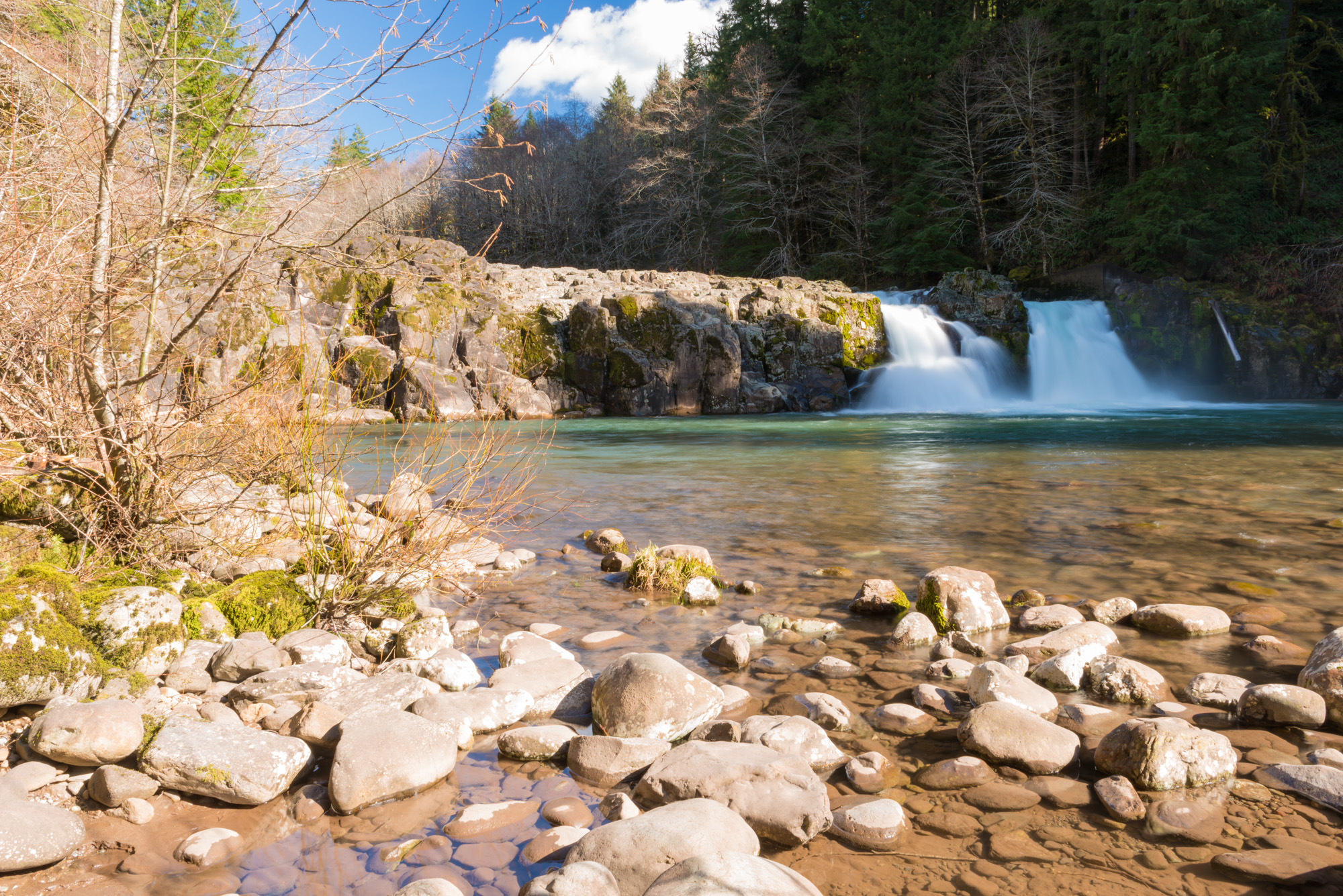
- Salmon Falls on the Little North Santiam River.

- Location of the mouth of the Little North Santiam River in Oregon
- Etymology: For the Santiam people, a Kalapuya tribe that lived near the Santiam River until removal to the Grande Ronde Reservation in 1906.

Location
- Country: United States
- State: Oregon
- County: Marion

Physical characteristics
- Source: confluence of Battle Ax and Opal creeks
  - location: Cascade Range
  - coordinates: 44°50′48″N 122°12′33″W
  - elevation: 2,085 ft (636 m)
- Mouth: North Santiam River
  - location: near Mehama
  - coordinates: 44°47′05″N 122°36′30″W
  - elevation: 619 ft (189 m)
- Length: 27 mi (43 km)
- Basin size: 113 sq mi (290 km^{2})
- Discharge
  - average: 746 cu ft/s (21.1 m^{3}/s)

The Little North Santiam River is a 27-mile (43 km) tributary of the North Santiam River in western Oregon in the United States. It drains 113 square miles (290 km^{2}) of the Cascade Range on the eastern side of the Willamette Valley east of Salem.

The river begins in the Opal Creek Wilderness at the confluence of Battle Ax and Opal creeks in Willamette National Forest and flows generally west-southwest through forests within Marion County to meet the larger river near Mehama. North Fork Road runs along the stream's lower reaches until it meets Forest Road 2209, which continues upstream to Opal Creek Trailhead.

Named tributaries from source to mouth are Opal, Battle Ax, Gold, Horn, Tincup, Cold, Stack, Cedar, and Little Cedar creeks. Then come Dry, Henline, Evans, Fawn, Elkhorn, Fish, Sinker, Moorehouse, and Big creeks. Further downstream are Cougar, Bear, Canyon, Kiel, Beaver, Jeeter, Cox, and Polly creeks.

== Recreation ==
=== Camping and day-use ===
Shady Cove Campground, managed by the United States Forest Service, is in the Opal Creek Scenic Recreation Area of Willamette National Forest along the upper river. Shady Cove's amenities include limited parking, sites for tent and trailer camping, picnic tables, toilets, and access to hiking trails but no drinking water. The campground is open all year but may be blocked by snow in winter and can be quite wet in April and May.

Downriver from Shady Cove is the Three Pools Day Use Area, also managed by the Forest Service. About 15,000 people visit the site annually. The area features "three spectacular emerald pools", used for swimming in the river. Amenities include picnic sites and restrooms but no drinking water.

Further downstream is Salmon Falls Park, a county park of 23 acres (9.3 ha). It is a day-use site that features a 30-foot (9 m) waterfall. Amenities include picnic tables, a restroom, and access to the river and to hiking trails. The park is open from May 1 to October 31.

On down the river from Salmon Falls, the Bureau of Land Management (BLM) oversees the Little North Santiam Recreation Area and its Elkhorn Valley Recreation Site, which has 23 tent and trailer campsites, 4 picnic sites, parking, toilets, drinking water, and access to trails and river beaches. Canyon Creek Recreation Site, a separate day-use park managed by the BLM, has 15 picnic sites, a sandy river beach, drinking water, parking, and toilets. Both sites are generally open from Memorial Day through Labor Day.

Bear Creek Park, operated by Marion County, lies on about 15 acres (6.1 ha) of land between the two BLM sites. Open from May 1 through October 31, it has 15 campsites with amenities including parking, a campground host, picnic tables, fire pits, a restroom, and access to the river and a hiking trail.

Further downstream is North Fork Park, a 12-acre (4.9 ha) day-use area managed by Marion County. Open from May 1 through October 31, it has picnic tables, river access, hiking trails, and a restroom.

=== Fishing ===
The river supports populations of rainbow trout (including runs of steelhead), as well as cutthroat trout. Trout fishing, best along the stream's upper reaches, is catch and release. Chinook salmon also frequent the river, but fishing for them on the Little North Santiam is not allowed.

== See also ==
- List of rivers of Oregon
