= Milo Academy Bridge =

Covered bridge in Milo, Oregon, U.S.

- U.S. National Register of Historic Places
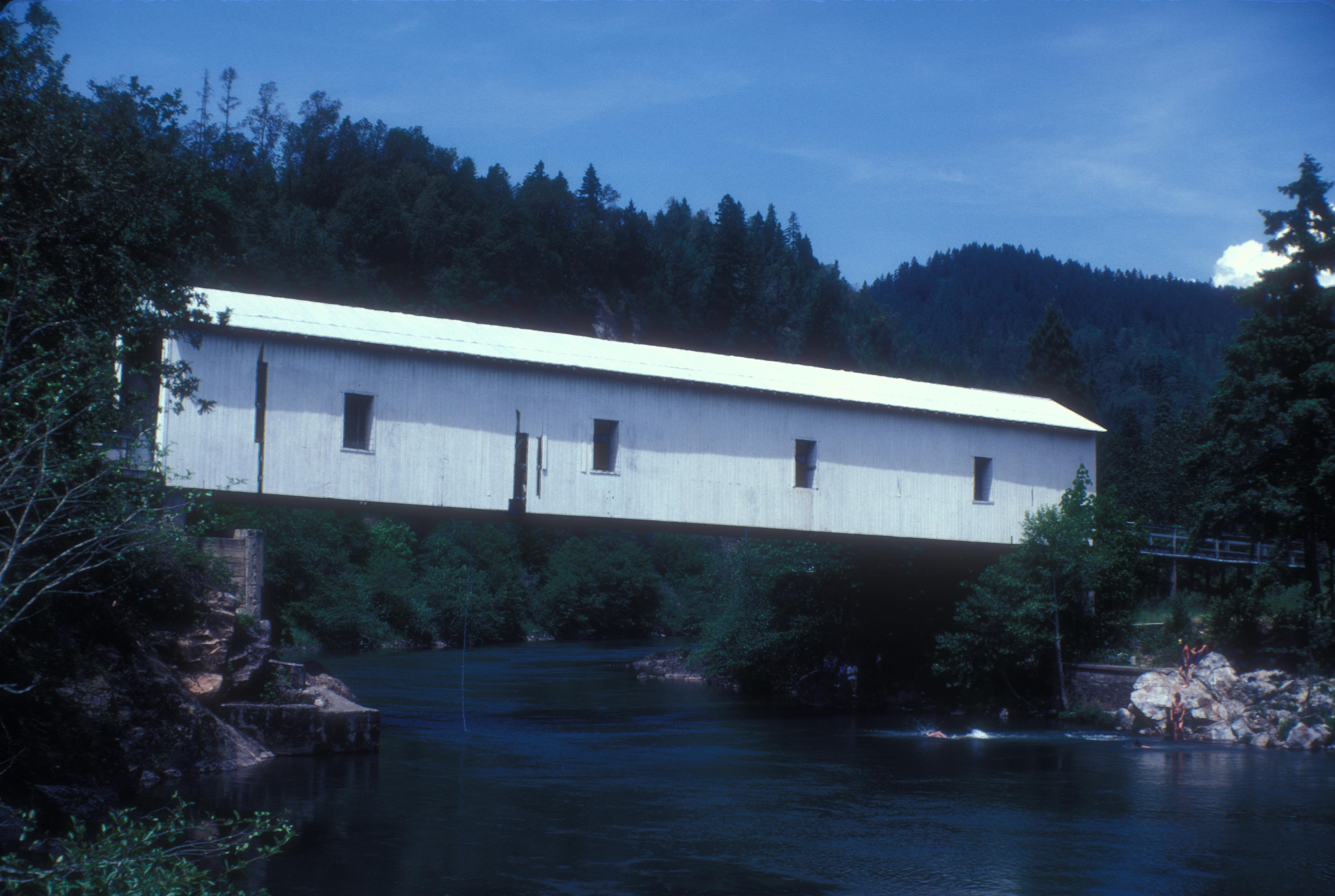
- The bridge in 2008

- Location within Oregon Location within the United States
- Location: Milo, Oregon
- Coordinates: 42°56′8″N 123°2′15″W
- Area: 0.1 acres (0.040 ha)
- Built: 1962
- MPS: Oregon Covered Bridges TR
- NRHP reference No.: 79002055
- Added to NRHP: November 29, 1979

The Milo Academy Bridge is a covered bridge located in the town of Milo, in the southern region of Douglas County, Oregon. The original bridge at this location was a wooden covered bridge constructed in 1920, before being replaced by a steel truss bridge in 1962, spanning the South Umpqua River allowing access to Milo Adventist Academy. The bridge was added to the National Register of Historic Places November 29, 1979.

== History ==
Early pioneers in the region needed to build bridges from the materials that they had on hand, Douglas fir was an abundant resource that proved to be well suited to bridge building. Covered bridges were the bridge of choice because of their longevity, the outer covering helps to protect the bridge structure from rotting in the wet climate. Between 1905 and 1925 Oregon had around 450 covered bridges in total, but by 1977 that number had dropped to 56. The remaining covered bridges were added to the National Register by the State Historic Preservation Office due to public concerns about the dwindling number. By 1962 the Academy deemed the original wooden bridge no longer safe for supporting the heavy farm vehicles needed for the agriculture program. Upon construction the new steel bridge lacked a covering because it was not required to protect the steel truss structure from degradation. Due to public concern about losing part of their community identity the covering from the original bridge was adapted to fit the new bridge.

== Architecture and importance ==
The Milo Academy bridge is under the private ownership and maintenance of Milo Adventist Academy. It is a 100 ft long, single lane, steel truss bridge with vertical wooden siding a metal-clad gabled roof. There are four rectangular windows on each side of the bridge and a large rectangular opening that allows for motorized traffic at each end. It stands on two concrete piers on either side of the river and is one of only two covered bridges in Oregon not supported by timber trusses. The other is the Swalley Canal (Rock O' The Range) Bridge located north of Bend in Deschutes county, Oregon. The Milo Academy Bridge is the only steel truss covered bridge in Oregon, with the covering having no structural purpose.

== See also ==
- List of bridges on the National Register of Historic Places in Oregon
- National Register of Historic Places listings in Douglas County, Oregon
