= Rochester Covered Bridge =

Covered bridge in Oregon, US

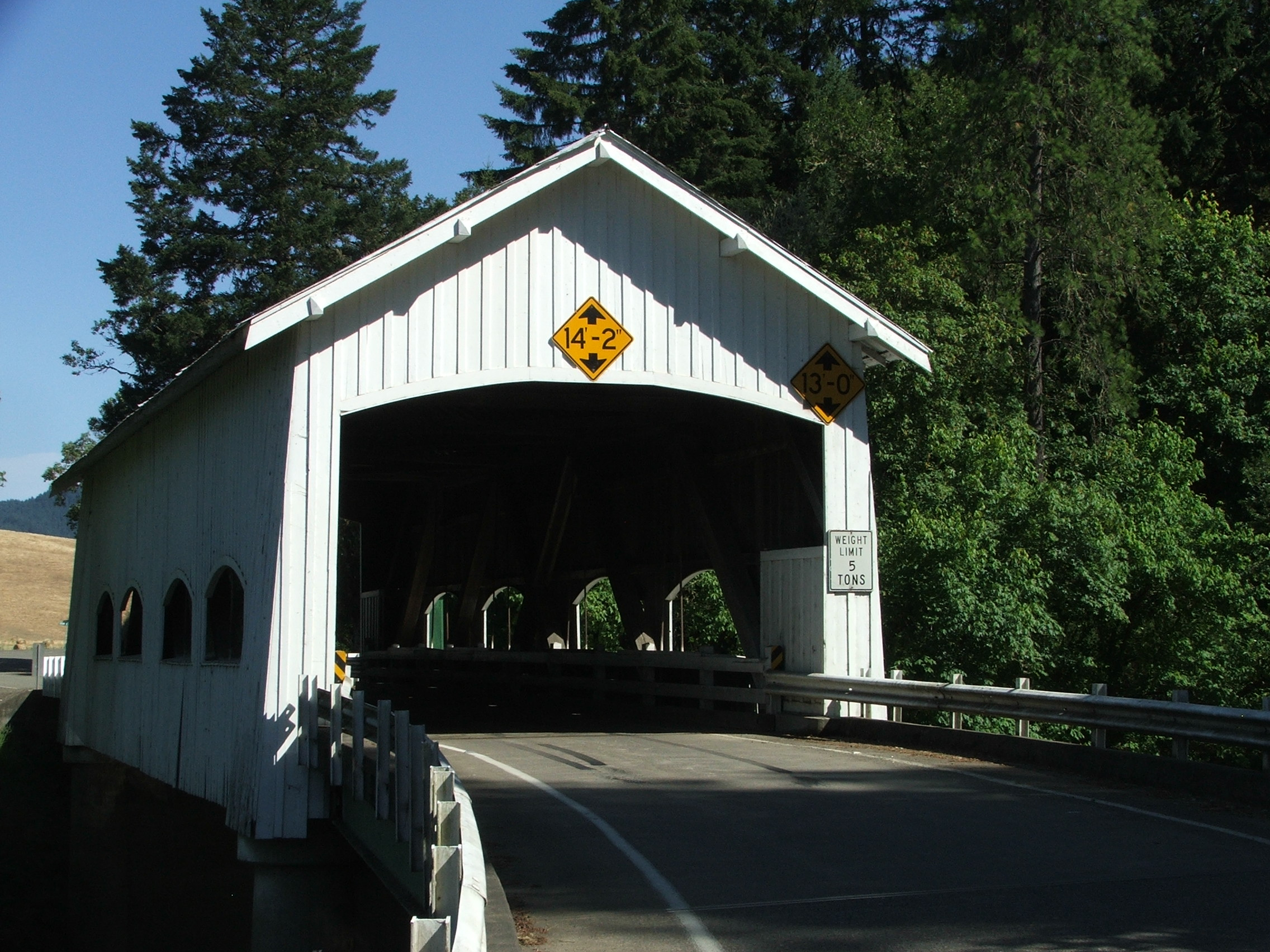
- Rochester Bridge over Calapooya Creek
- Coordinates: 43°24′06.2″N 123°21′46.3″W
- Carries: Rochester Road
- Crosses: Calapooya Creek

Characteristics
- Design: Covered Howe truss
- Total length: 80 feet (24 m)

History
- Constructed by: Floyd Frear
- Opened: 1933

Rochester Covered Bridge is a covered bridge in Douglas County in the U.S. state of Oregon. Built by Floyd Frear in 1933, it carries Rochester Road over Calapooya Creek about 3 miles (5 km) west of Sutherlin.

The bridge design, which Historic Highway Bridges of Oregon calls "unique among Oregon's housed structures", includes side windows with curved tops. The bridge has four windows on each side, portals with flat arched openings, and exposed false beams at the gable ends.

According to the Oregon Department of Transportation, after county workers burned down another covered bridge in the vicinity in the late 1950s, a group of armed local residents guarded the Rochester Bridge one night to protect it from the same fate. The next day, county commissioners told the residents that the bridge would not be burned. In 1969, the county remodeled the bridge by replacing portal boarding, approaches, and abutments.

Oregon's Covered Bridges includes a photograph of an earlier bridge here "at the end of its useful life". The photo caption says that the age of construction of the earlier bridge is not known but that some records show a covered bridge at this site as early as 1862.

== See also ==
- List of Oregon covered bridges
