= Ames Creek (South Santiam River tributary) =

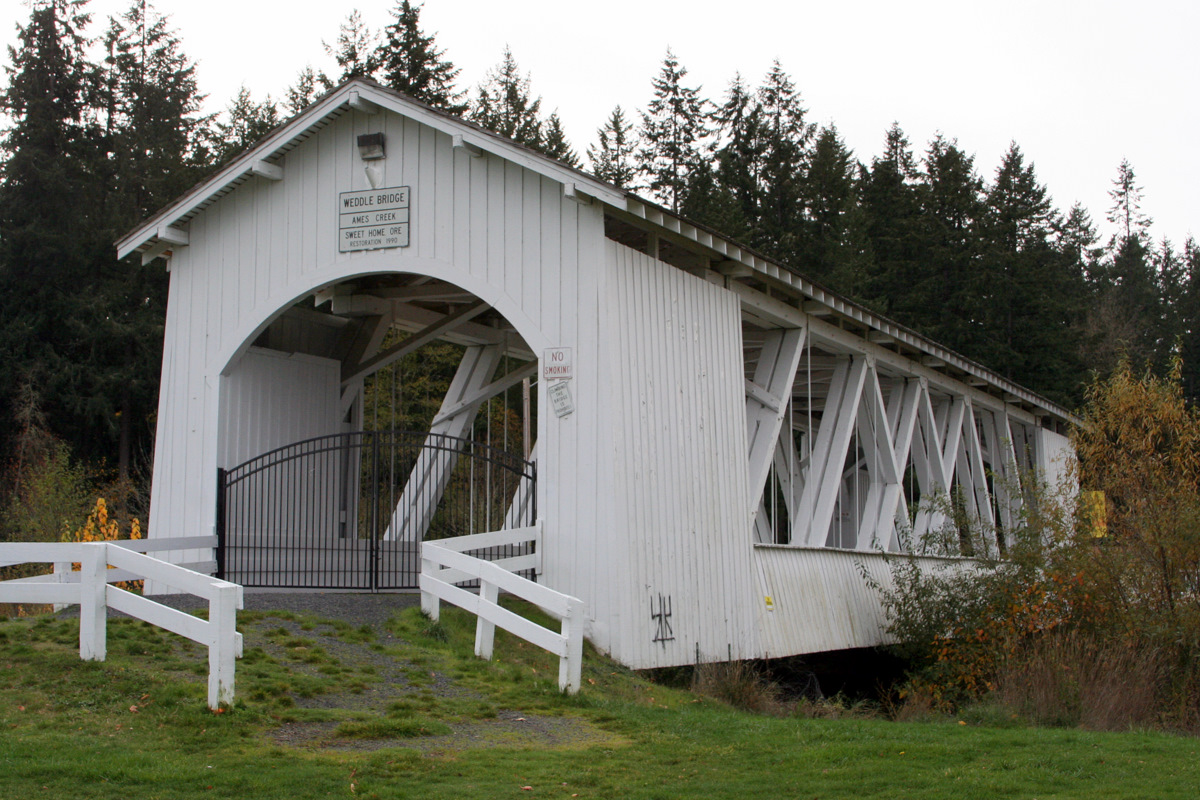
- Weddle Bridge over Ames Creek in Sankey Park

- Location of the mouth of Ames Creek in Oregon

Location
- Country: United States
- State: Oregon
- County: Linn

Physical characteristics
- Source: Cascade Range foothills
  - location: near Chimney Rock
  - coordinates: 44°19′43″N 122°40′40″W
  - elevation: 2,020 ft (620 m)
- Mouth: South Santiam River
  - location: Sweet Home
  - coordinates: 44°23′33″N 122°43′28″W
  - elevation: 551 ft (168 m)

Ames Creek is a small tributary of the South Santiam River in the U.S. state of Oregon. It begins near Chimney Rock in the foothills of the Cascade Range in Linn County. It flows northwest to meet the river at Sweet Home, about 33 miles (53 km) by river from the South Santiam's confluence with the Santiam River. Ames Creek passes under U.S. Route 20 just before entering the river.

== Covered bridge ==
Weddle Bridge, a covered bridge, spans the creek in Sankey Park in Sweet Home. The bridge originally spanned Thomas Creek elsewhere in Linn County but was rebuilt over Ames Creek in 1989.

== See also ==
- List of rivers of Oregon
