= Short Bridge =

Covered bridge in Oregon, US

- U.S. National Register of Historic Places
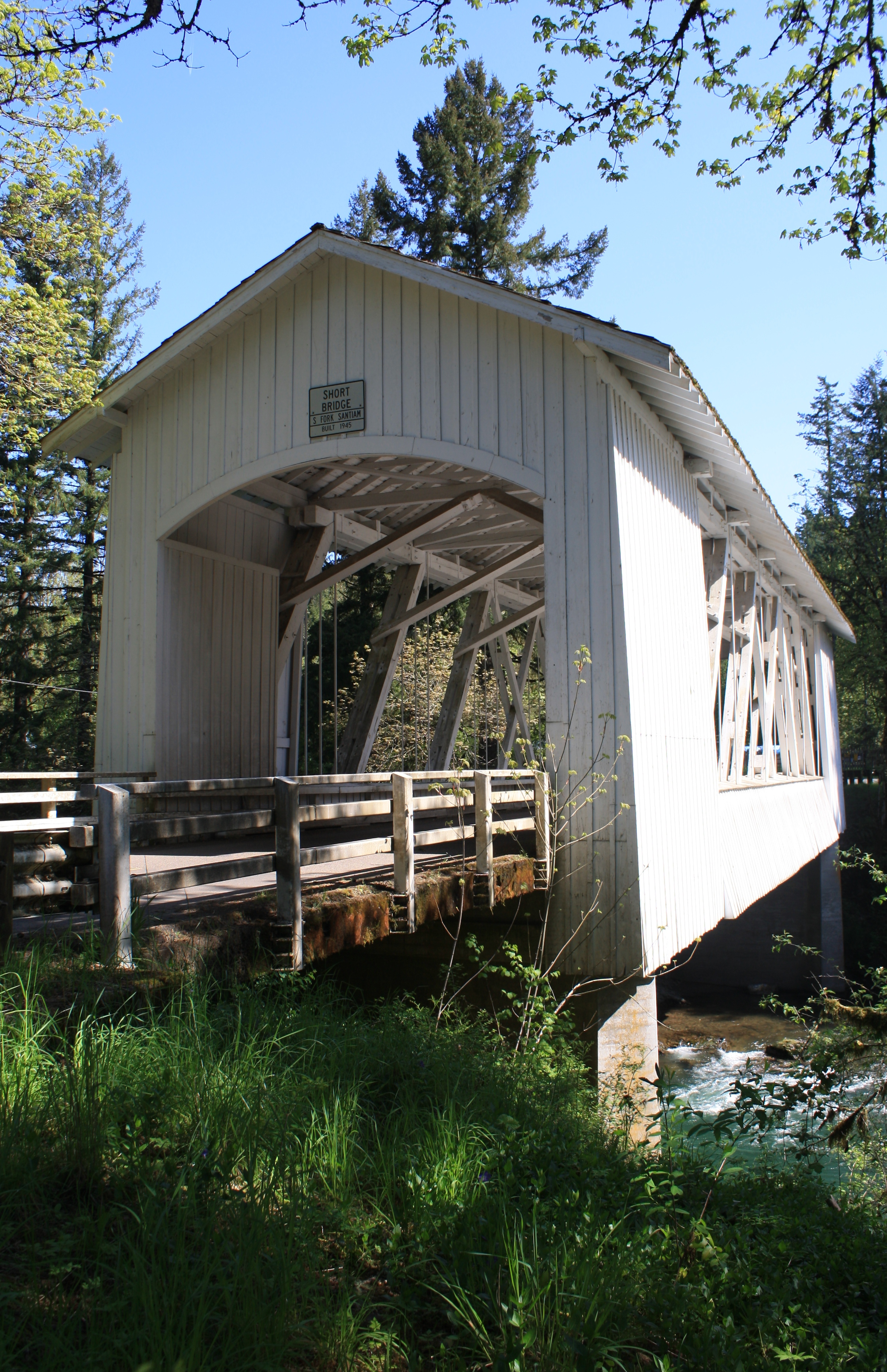
- The Short Covered Bridge spans the South Santiam River.

- Location within Oregon Location within the United States
- Location: High Deck Road, Cascadia, Oregon
- Coordinates: 44°23′29.6″N 122°30′35.5″W
- Built: 1945
- Architectural style: Howe truss
- NRHP reference No.: 79002113
- Added to NRHP: November 29, 1979

The Short Bridge spans the South Santiam River 12 miles (19 km) east of Sweet Home, Oregon, near the community of Cascadia. The 105-foot (32 m) Howe truss type bridge was built in 1945. It is named for Gordon Short, a long-time area resident. The bridge is listed on the National Register of Historic Places.

== See also ==
- List of bridges documented by the Historic American Engineering Record in Oregon
- List of bridges on the National Register of Historic Places in Oregon
