= Milo Adventist Academy =

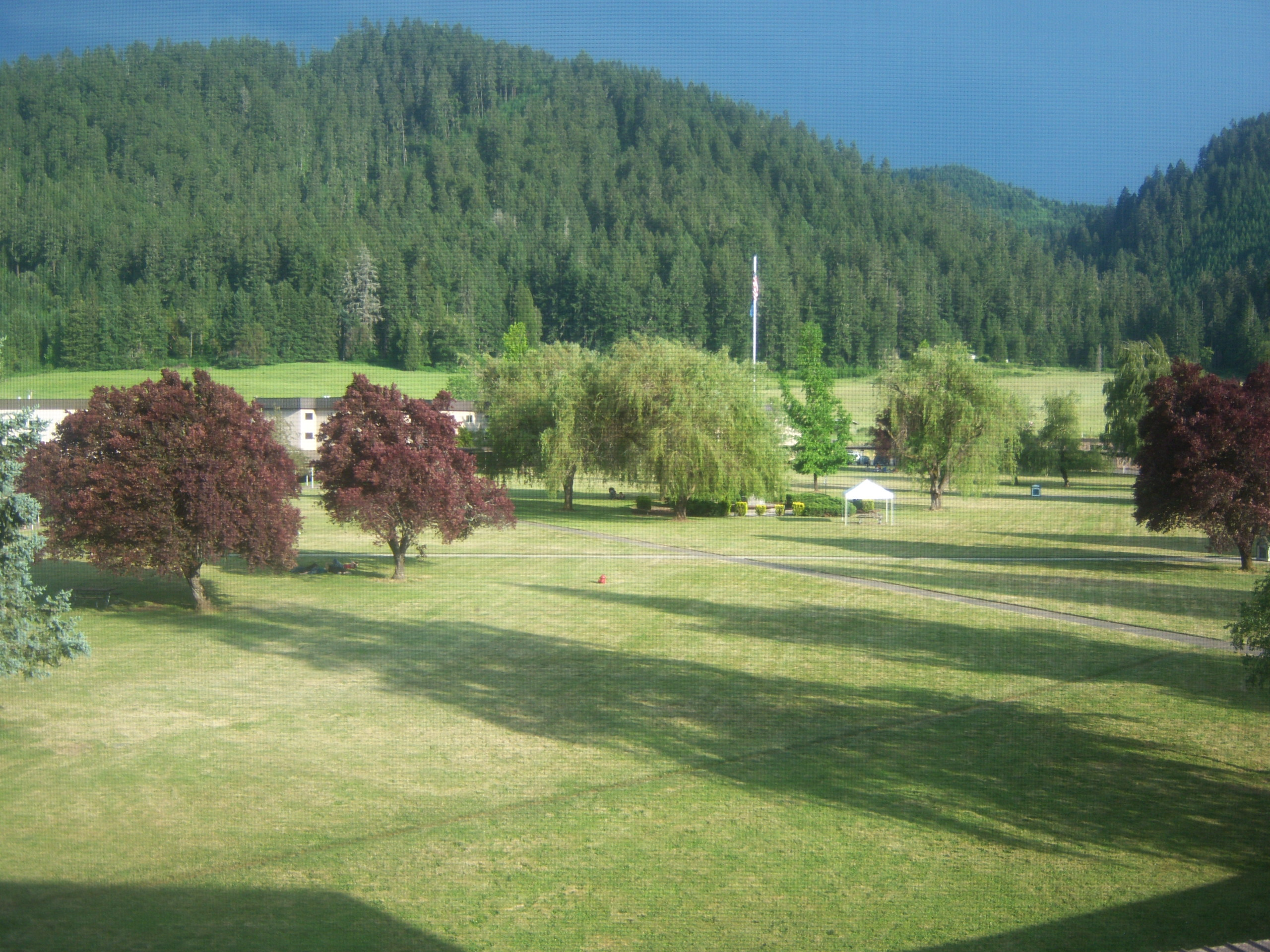

Location
- 324 Milo Drive; Days Creek, Douglas County, Oregon 97429; United States; 42.934507°N 123.035342°W

Information
- Type: Private, Day & Boarding
- CEEB code: 380668
- Principal: John Winslow
- Grades: 9-12
- Colors: Red, white, and black
- Athletics conference: OSAA Skyline League 1A-4
- Mascot: Mustangs
- Accreditation: NAAS
- Affiliation: Adventist
- Website: www.miloadventistacademy.com

Milo Adventist Academy is a small private Adventist high school in the rural unincorporated community of Milo, Oregon, United States. It is a part of the Seventh-day Adventist education system, the world's second largest Christian school system. As Milo no longer has a post office, Milo Academy has a Days Creek mailing address. The only access to the school's campus is by the historical Milo Academy Bridge.

The school has been accredited by the Northwest Association of Accredited Schools since 1964.

== See also ==
- List of Seventh-day Adventist secondary schools
- Seventh-day Adventist education
