= Syracuse, Oregon =

Coordinates: 44.72440°N 123.04670°W

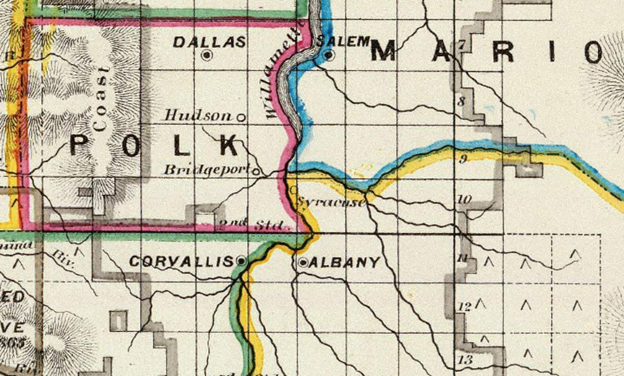
Detail of an 1866 map showing the location of Syracuse, Oregon in Linn County

Syracuse was a historic community in Linn County, Oregon, United States. It was located along the Santiam River, about two miles west of Jefferson. Syracuse was the first pioneer settlement in Linn County, predating Albany.

The area's original inhabitants were the Santiam people of the Kalapuya tribe. Some of the last remaining Santiam people in the area were forced to move to the Grand Ronde Reservation in 1906.

Syracuse was founded by Kentucky native Milton Hale, a pioneer who came to the Oregon Country on the Oregon Trail from Burlington, Iowa in 1845. He established a ferry on the Santiam River downstream from what is now Jefferson. Hale's Ferry became an important crossing point for the expansion of Oregon Trail settlers into Linn and Lane counties. The town of Syracuse was on his land claim on the south bank of the river. Syracuse post office was established in 1850, with Jacob S. Conser as the first postmaster. In 1852, the post office moved, and the name was changed to Santiam City, a rival city founded by Samuel S. Miller on the north bank of the river in Marion County. Syracuse and Santiam City eventually lost business to Jefferson, which was founded by Jacob Conser. Santiam City post office was moved and renamed Jefferson in 1861.

Both Syracuse and Santiam City across the river were washed out by the Great Flood of 1862 and never rebuilt. No trace of either town exists today.

The Simison-Hale Cemetery (a.k.a. Syracuse Cemetery or Milton Hale Cemetery) is located near the site of Hale Ferry, probably a short distance west of the townsite. Milton Hale himself is not buried there because there was fear that if the Santiam changed course, it would wash the cemetery away.

== Polk County ==
There was also a Syracuse post office in Polk County near Falls City from 1885 to 1889.

== See also ==
- Historic ferries in Oregon
