= Calapooya Creek =

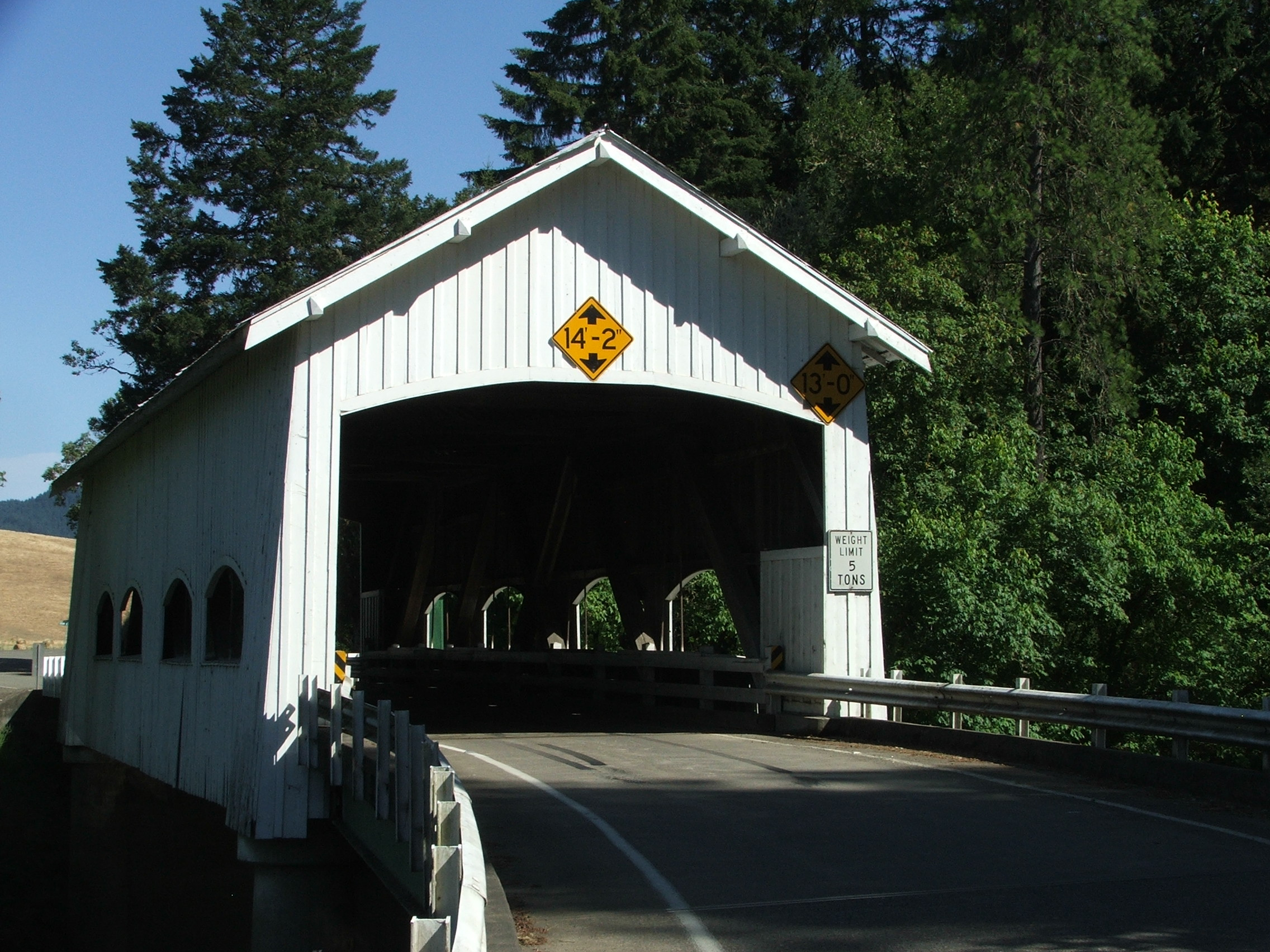
- Rochester Covered Bridge over Calapooya Creek

- Location of the mouth of Calapooya Creek in Oregon
- Etymology: For a division of the Kalapuya people living between the Willamette and Umpqua rivers

Location
- Country: United States
- State: Oregon
- County: Douglas

Physical characteristics
- Source: Confluence of the creek's north and south forks
  - location: South side of Calapooya Divide
  - coordinates: 43°28′51″N 123°01′56″W
- Mouth: Umpqua River
  - location: Umpqua
  - coordinates: 43°21′57″N 123°27′58″W
- Length: 37 mi (60 km)
- Basin size: 246 sq mi (640 km^{2})

Calapooya Creek is a tributary, about 37 miles (60 km) long, of the Umpqua River in Douglas County in the U.S. state of Oregon. Formed by its north and south forks, the creek drains a mountainous region south of the Calapooya Divide and east of Oakland and Sutherlin.

From its source, the creek flows generally southwest through or near Nonpareil and Oakland. Near Oakland it passes under Oregon Route 99 and Interstate 5 and further downstream Oregon Route 138 before entering the river at the rural community of Umpqua.

== Bridge ==
Rochester Covered Bridge carries Rochester Road over Calapooya Creek about 3 miles (5 km) west of Sutherlin. Built in 1933, its unusual design features side windows with curved tops.

== Tributaries ==
Named tributaries from source to mouth are the North Fork Calapooya Creek and South Fork Calapooya Creek. Then come White, Coon, Timothy, Buzzard Roost, Cooper, and Filler creeks. Below these come Jeffers, Hinkle, Gilbreath, Gassy, Cantell, Pelland, Long Valley, and Banks creeks. Further downstream are Foster, Oldham, Pollock, Cabin, Cook, Dodge Canyon, Coon, and Burke creeks.

== See also ==
- List of rivers of Oregon
