= Swalley Irrigation District =

Irrigation district near Bend, Oregon, US

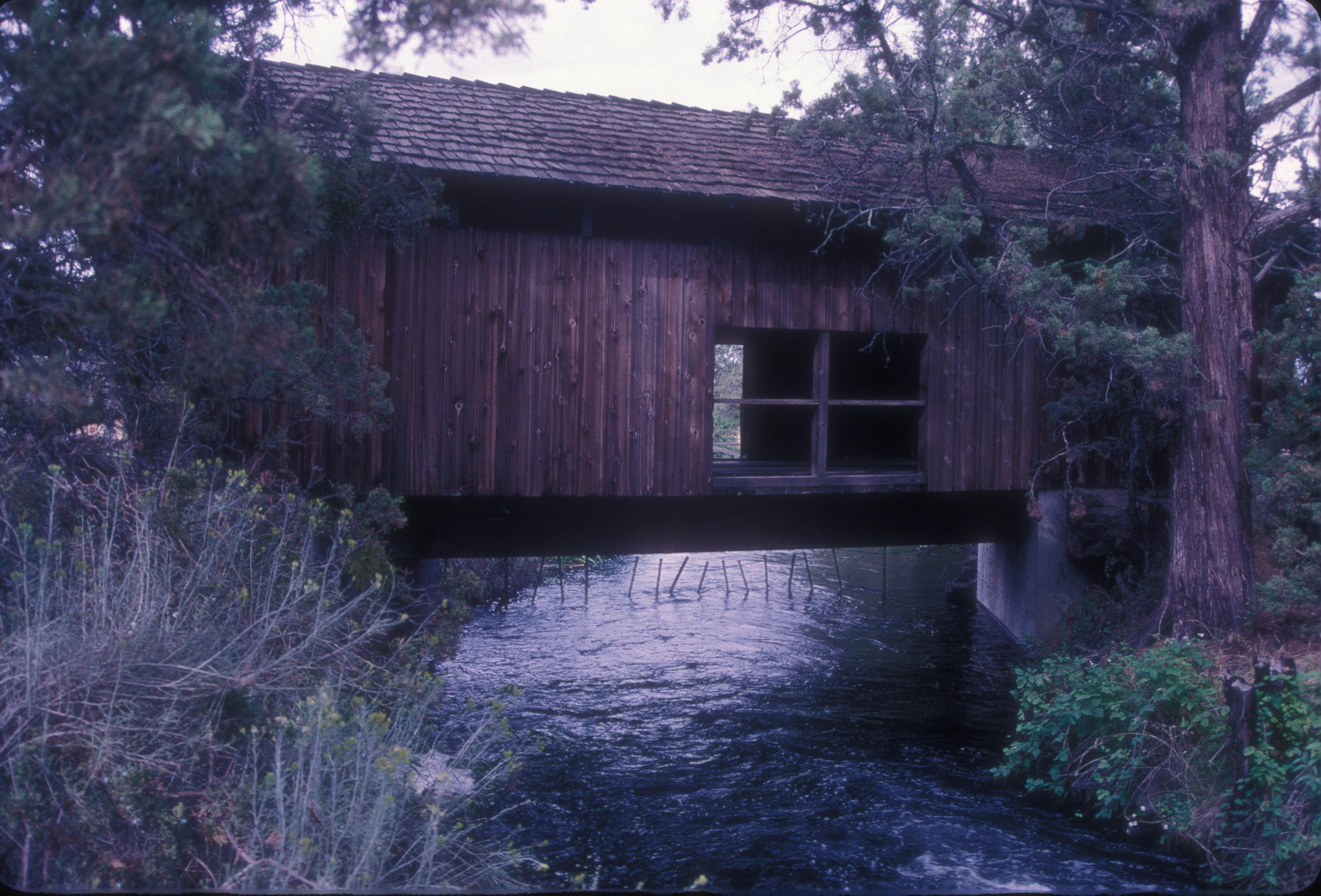
- Bridge over the Swalley Canal
- Predecessor: Deschutes Reclamation and Irrigation Company (DRIC) (1899)
- Formation: September 1, 1899
- Founder: (DRIC, 1899) Eight families of homesteaders including two families named Swalley
- Type: Municipal Corporation - ORS 545
- Legal status: Active local government duly organized under ORS 545
- Purpose: Water distribution
- Headquarters: Bend, Oregon
- Region served: Central Oregon
- Methods: Canal & Pipeline Conveyance
- Website: www.swalley.com

The Swalley Irrigation District supplies water to irrigators through a network of pipes and canals fed by the Deschutes River near Bend in the U.S. state of Oregon. The network, begun in 1899, is a closed system with an intake behind North Canal Dam in Bend and a main canal, the Swalley Canal, that runs north from the city for about 13 miles (21 km). The only covered bridge east of the Cascade Range in Oregon crosses the Swalley Canal.

The district diverts about 82 CFS from the river during the irrigation season, April through October. Water requirements for Swalley have fallen by about 43 CFS over the years due to major water conservation projects and other efficiency projects and programs. Water savings from conservation projects means that more water stays in the river, where increased flow improves conditions for redband trout and other biological species. The district operates a small in-conduit hydroelectric plant that generates renewable energy from the water it diverts for irrigation purposes.

== History ==
The irrigation district was formed in 1899 as the Deschutes Reclamation and Irrigation Company (DRIC). In 1994, when shareholders in the company decided to incorporate as an irrigation district, they adopted the name Swalley Irrigation District after two resident families named Swalley who helped form and manage the DRIC. One of the Swalleys became the project leader and helped build the flumes that carried "Swalley water".

== Description ==
The 17,000-acre (6,900 ha) district is about 14 miles (23 km) long and about 4 miles (6.4 km) wide. Its headworks at the North Canal Dam on the Deschutes River in Bend are at 3,558 feet (1,084 m) above sea level, and the water descends through pipes and open canals to farmland as much as 400 feet (0.12 km) lower.

The 13-mile (21 km) main canal, the Swalley Canal, and its network of 15 miles (24 km) of side canals, deliver water north of the city to about 700 customers. The district lies generally between U.S. Route 20 on the west and U.S. Route 97 on the east.

Water enters the system from behind the North Canal Dam on the Deschutes River in Bend. For its first 5.1 miles (8.2 km), the water flows through pressurized pipe. In 2010, the district completed the piping and the addition of an in-conduit 0.75-megawatt hydroelectric plant. The plant produces enough electricity to supply about 375 homes and businesses near Bend's Old Mill District. Annual income to the district from selling electricity is estimated between $160,000 and $190,000. Grants from other agencies had covered all but $2 million of the $14.5 million cost to build the plant, which has an expected lifespan of 50 to 100 years.

The canal delivers water another 7 miles (11 km) beyond the hydroelectric plant but does not discharge to a storage reservoir or any natural water body. It is a closed system with no end-spills or returns to the Deschutes River. Advanced Fish and Debris Screens prevent fish from entering the Main Canal Pipeline at the headworks.

The average customer in the district receives enough water to irrigate 6 acres (2.4 ha). The most common crops are grass and alfalfa, and some customers use the water for oats, shrubs, pine trees, wine grapes, nursery stock, conservation materials, industrial hemp, schoolground sports fields, parks, and other vegetation.

== Conservation ==
The district began converting open canals to pipelines in the early 21st century to prevent water loss to leaks and evaporation. The 2010 project allowed 28 cubic feet per second (0.79 m^{3}/s) of water to be subtracted from the Swalley District's allotment, which dropped to 84 cubic feet per second (2.4 m^{3}/s). The increased flow along the Middle Deschutes improved conditions for life forms, such as the redband trout, that live in the river.

Earlier piping on lateral canals in the Swalley system and the nearby Central Oregon Irrigation District had already reduced diversions from the river totaling 6.6 cubic feet per second (0.19 m^{3}/s) during the irrigation season, April through October. The goal of the Deschutes River Conservancy, which supported the projects, was to increase the minimum flow of the river below Bend from 30 to 100 cubic feet per second (0.8 to 2.8 m^{3}/s). The piping proceeded despite objections from homeowners who unsuccessfully sued to keep the canal open on grounds that their property values would fall if the surface stream were replaced by a pipe.

== Bridge ==
An unusual covered bridge spans the canal about 2 miles (3 km) north of Bend. The Rock O' the Range Bridge, the only covered bridge in Oregon that lies east of the Cascade Range, carries Bowery Lane over the canal. In 1963, a developer had the bridge built to provide access to his property. Land owners in the development pay to maintain the public bridge, one of only a few privately funded covered bridges built in recent decades.

== Coordinates ==
The Geographic Names Information System lists two sets of coordinates for the Swalley Canal. One is at 44°06′46″N 121°17′18″W in the Bend quadrant of the United States Geological Survey topographic map. The other is at 44°08′30″N 121°17′28″W in the Tumalo quadrant.

The coordinates for the head of the Swalley Canal are 44°04′32.06″N 121°18′22.06″W.

The coordinates for the covered bridge are 44°07′20.6″N 121°17′12.6″W.
