= Rock O' the Range Bridge =

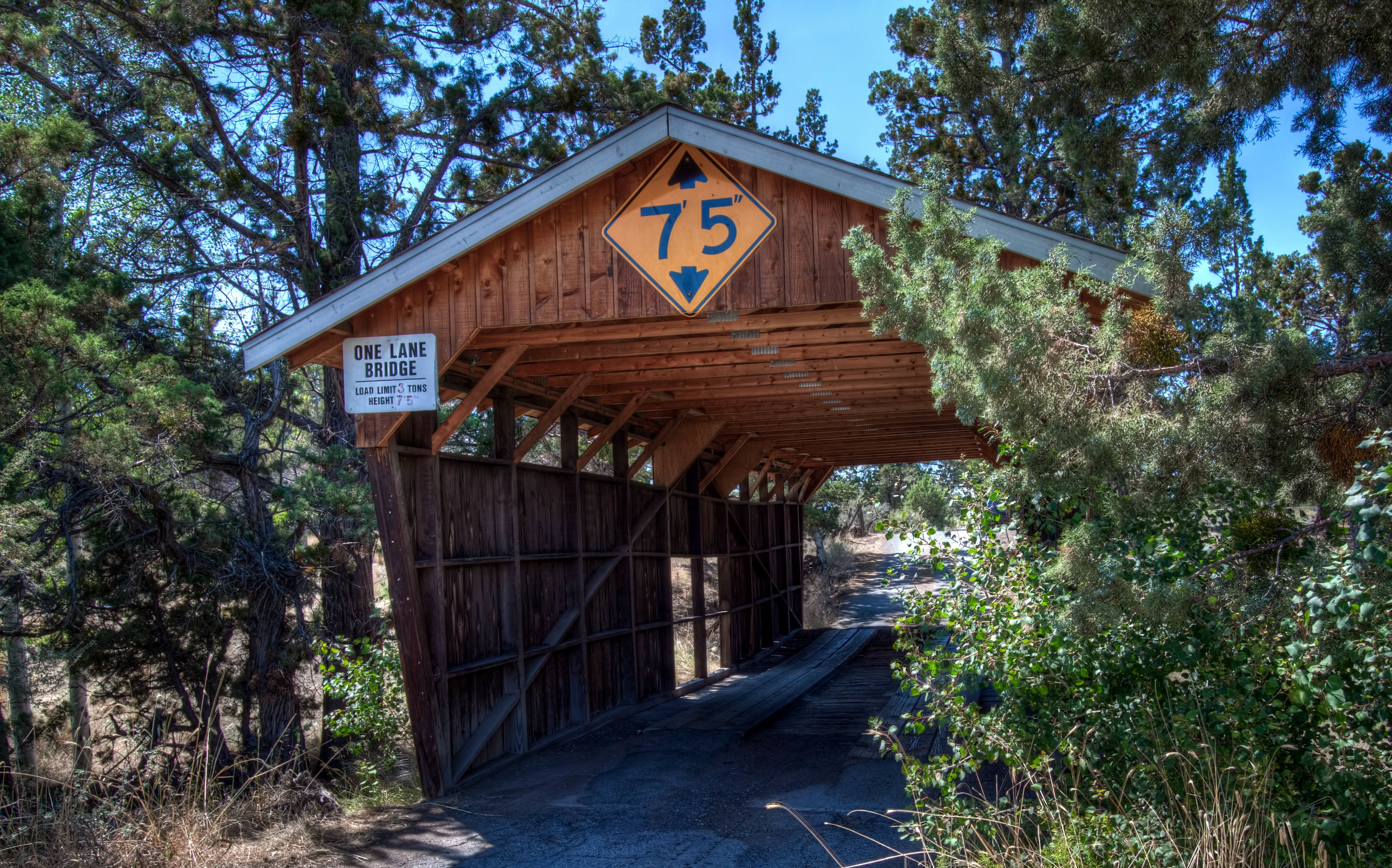
- Coordinates: 44°07′20″N 121°17′13″W
- Carries: Bowery Lane
- Crosses: Swalley Canal
- Maintained by: Local Homeowners

Characteristics
- Design: Covered
- Total length: 42 feet (13 m)
- Clearance above: 12.3 feet (3.7 m)

History
- Constructed by: Maurice Olson
- Construction end: 1963
- Rock O' the Range Bridge
- U.S. National Register of Historic Places
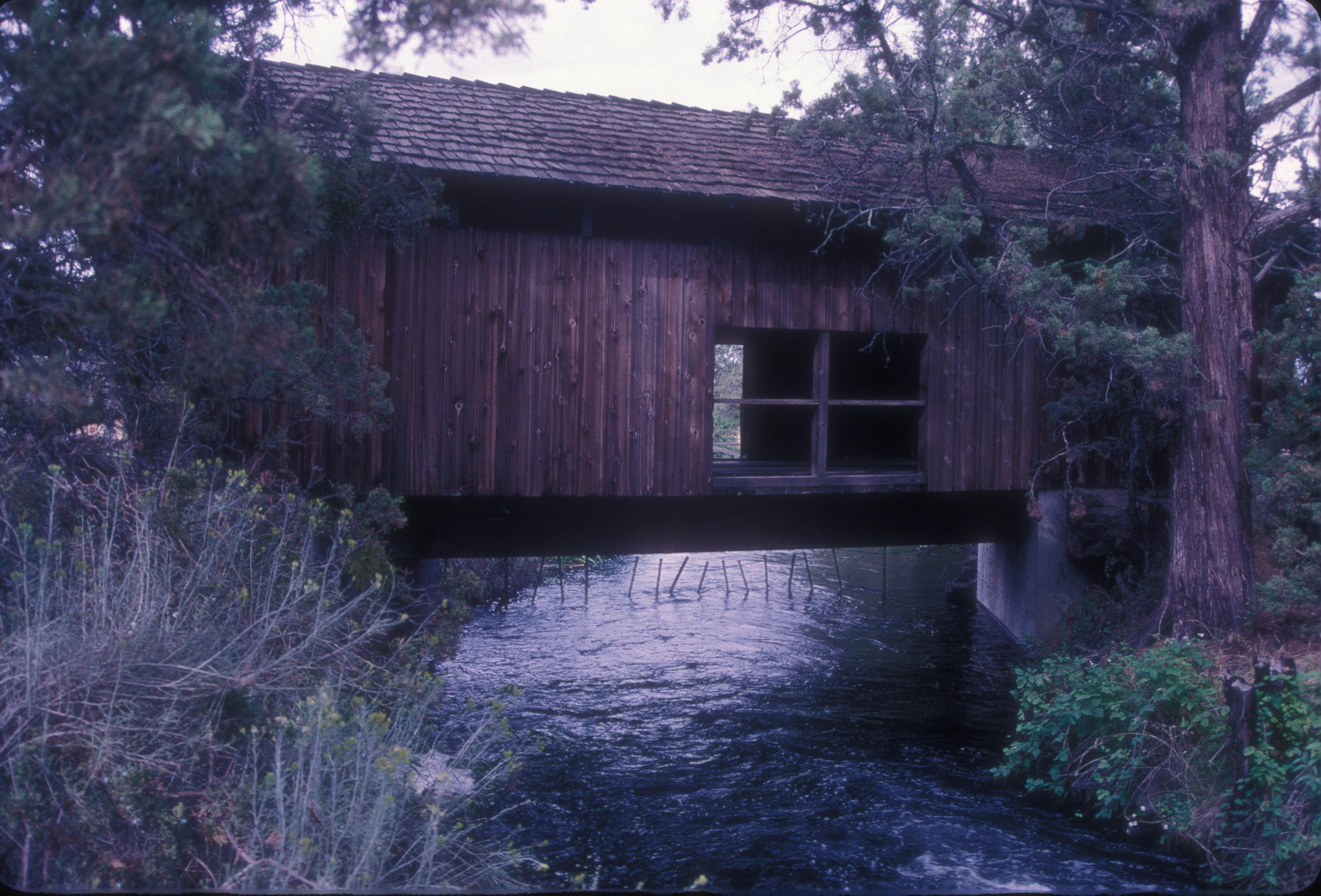
- Nearest city: Bend, Oregon
- Architectural style: King Post Truss
- MPS: Oregon Covered Bridges TR
- NRHP reference No.: 79002054
- Added to NRHP: 29 November 1979

Location
- Interactive map of Rock O' the Range Bridge

The Rock O' the Range Bridge, also called the Swalley Canal Bridge, is a bridge located north of Bend, Oregon, U.S., on a street adjacent to U.S. Route 97. It is the only covered span in the state of Oregon on the east side of the Cascade Range. It is also one of very few privately owned covered bridges in Oregon.

== History ==
William Bowen, a proprietor of land north of Bend, was forced to build an access road across the Swalley Canal to access his property. His bridge was inspired by the Goodpasture Bridge in Lane County. Bowen hired Maurice Olson to build the bridge; it was finished in 1963 for $4500 ($47,323 in 2025).

High loads have damaged the portal boards and roof braces, due to an unusually short 9-foot (270 cm) clearance.

== Controversy ==
Though the Rock O' The Range Bridge has a roof on it, it is technically not a covered bridge according to the World Guide because it is not supported by a truss. The World Guide appended a letter to the identification number to make it unique to other covered bridges.

Because of its small size and safety hazard, the bridge is denied maintenance by Deschutes County. Upkeep is performed by homeowners using the bridge.

== See also ==
- List of bridges on the National Register of Historic Places in Oregon
- List of Oregon covered bridges
