= Milo, Oregon =

Unincorporated community in the state of Oregon, United States

- Unincorporated community
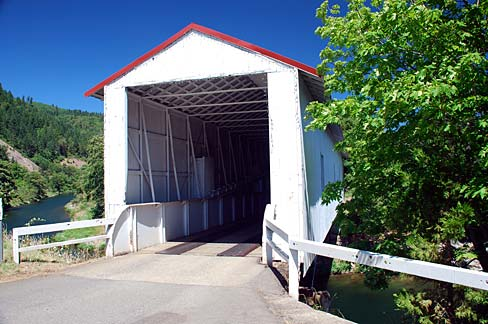
- Milo Academy Bridge

- Location within Oregon Location within the United States
- Coordinates: 42°55′50″N 123°02′59″W
- Country: United States
- State: Oregon
- County: Douglas
- Elevation: 919 ft (280 m)
- Time zone: UTC-8 (Pacific (PST))
  - Summer (DST): UTC-7 (PDT)
- ZIP code: 97429
- GNIS feature ID: 1146297

Milo is an unincorporated community in Douglas County, Oregon, United States, about 17 miles (27 km) east of Canyonville on the South Umpqua River.

Milo post office was established in 1923; Cora E. Buker was the first postmaster. It was named for Milo, Maine, the hometown of Amos O. Buker, who was the husband of Cora. Originally the post office at this locale was named "Perdue", named after John Perdue, Sr., who was also its first postmaster. It was originally at the confluence of the South Umpqua River and Elk Creek—which today is the location of Tiller—and the office was first called "Elk Creek". Elk Creek post office was founded in 1877. Perdue took over as postmaster of the Elk Creek post office on June 11, 1884 and on August 22, the name was changed to Perdue. At the same time the office was moved to the current location of Milo. The office was closed in 1920 when no one could be found to replace then-postmaster Amos Buker, who was fired after he had acted against postal regulations by working as a United States Census enumerator. Today Milo has a Days Creek mailing address.

Oregon's only steel bridge capped with a covered bridge structure crosses the South Umpqua River in Milo. The bridge was built in 1962 and covered by the request of local residents who missed the earlier wooden bridge at this location. The Milo Academy Bridge is the only access to the Milo Adventist Academy, a private Seventh-day Adventist boarding school. The bridge is on the National Register of Historic Places.
