= Crabtree, Oregon =

Unincorporated community in the state of Oregon, United States

- Census-designated place
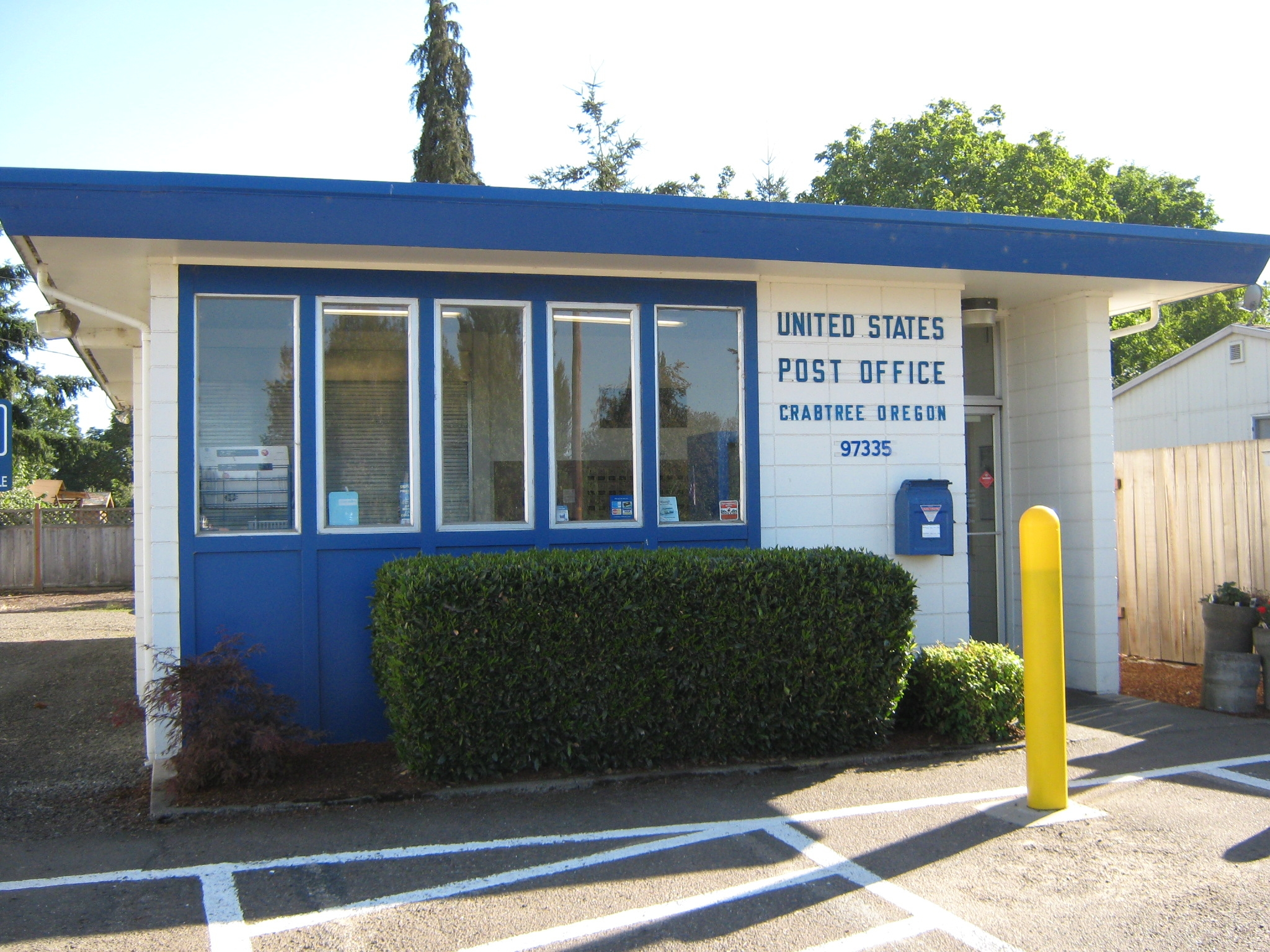
- Crabtree post office

- Location within Oregon Location within the United States
- Coordinates: 44°38′16″N 122°54′21″W
- Country: United States
- State: Oregon
- County: Linn

Area
  - Total: 1.81 sq mi (4.70 km^{2})
  - Land: 1.81 sq mi (4.70 km^{2})
  - Water: 0 sq mi (0.00 km^{2})
- Elevation: 276 ft (84 m)

Population (2020)
  - Total: 406
  - Density: 223.6/sq mi (86.35/km^{2})
- Time zone: UTC-8 (Pacific (PST))
  - Summer (DST): UTC-7 (PDT)
- ZIP code: 97335
- FIPS code: 41-16350
- GNIS feature ID: 2584412

Crabtree is an unincorporated community and census-designated place in Linn County, Oregon, United States. As of the 2020 census, Crabtree had a population of 406. It has a post office with a ZIP code of 97335. Crabtree lies off Oregon Route 226 about 10 miles (16 km) east of Albany.

The town received its name when the Southern Pacific Railroad reached there. Crabtree Creek and Crabtree Lake in Linn County were named for pioneer John J. Crabtree, a native of Virginia, who arrived in the Oregon Country in 1845. He wintered in the Tualatin Plains, then bought the William Packwood Donation Land Claim east of the forks of the Santiam River in the spring in 1846. The station and community were named for John Crabtree's cousin Fletcher Crabtree.

There is a fire station and a Christian church. The Crabtree Tavern closed in 2013.

== Demographics ==
Historical population
Census	Pop.	Note	%±
2020	406		—
U.S. Decennial Census

406 residents lived in Crabtree as of the 2020 census.

== History ==
In 1880, a branch line of the Southern Pacific Railroad was built, (now owned by the Albany & Eastern Railroad) and at its intersection with the Santiam Wagon Road a depot was built. This station was named Crabtree, and a post office was established there on February 28, 1887. In 1890, resident John Meyer built the first store in Crabtree. The first store burned down prior to 1923. In 1909, the Crabtree Christian Church was established, and the building was dedicated on May 29, 1910. In 1913, prominent Crabtree resident William Turnidge built a hardware store on the site of a former cream station which was sold to Sillman Wirt in June 1917. After prohibition, the store became the Crabtree Tavern which was in operation until 2013. In 1919, George Vana built a garage in Crabtree which housed the Crabtree Garage until 1937. The building was later used as a barber shop. In 1923, a new general store was built in Crabtree. It last housed Knight's General Store from 1949 until it closed in 1975. In 1973, OR-226 was rerouted when a new bridge was built over the South Santiam River and bypassed Crabtree.
