= Santiam River =

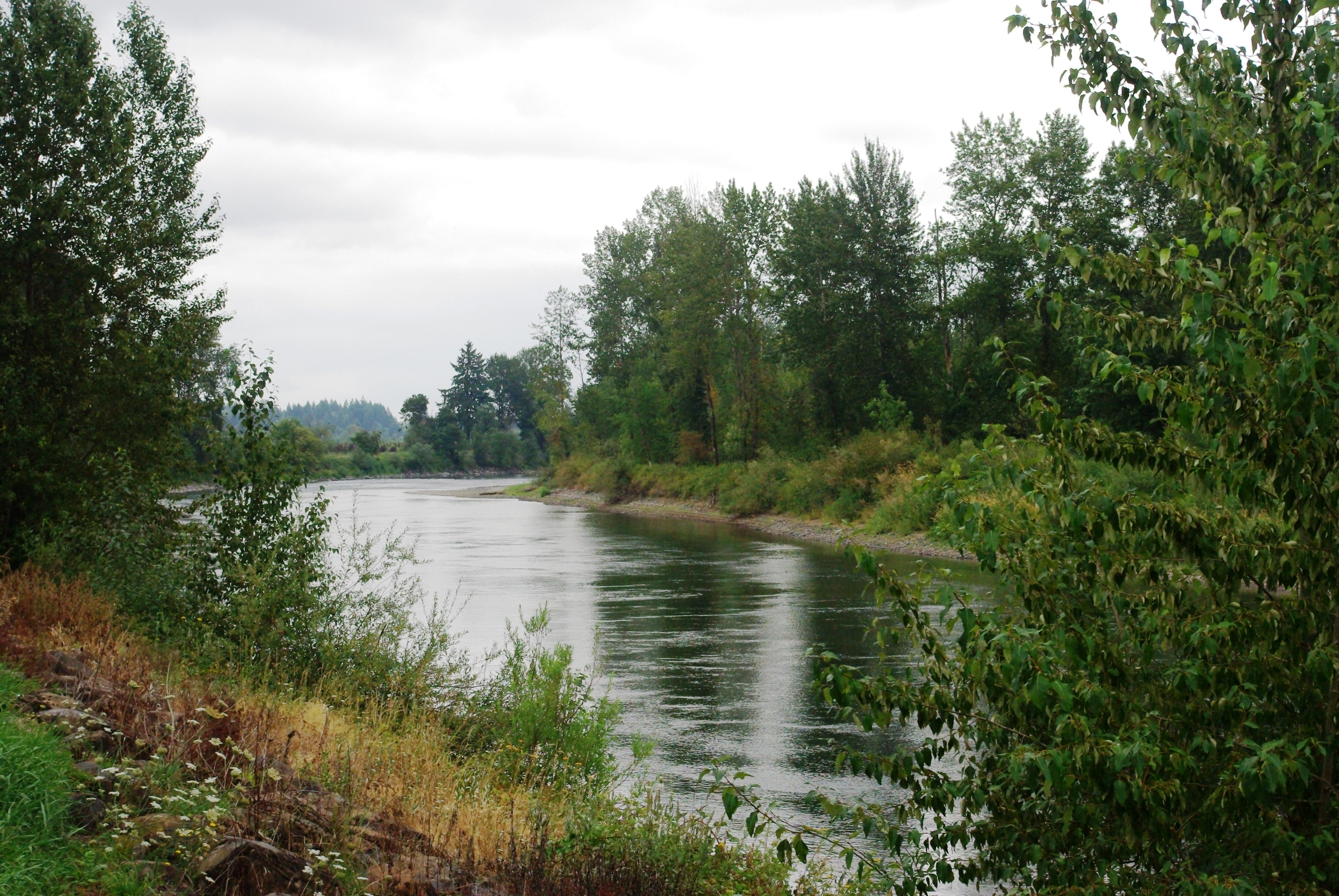
- Near Interstate 5 in Linn County

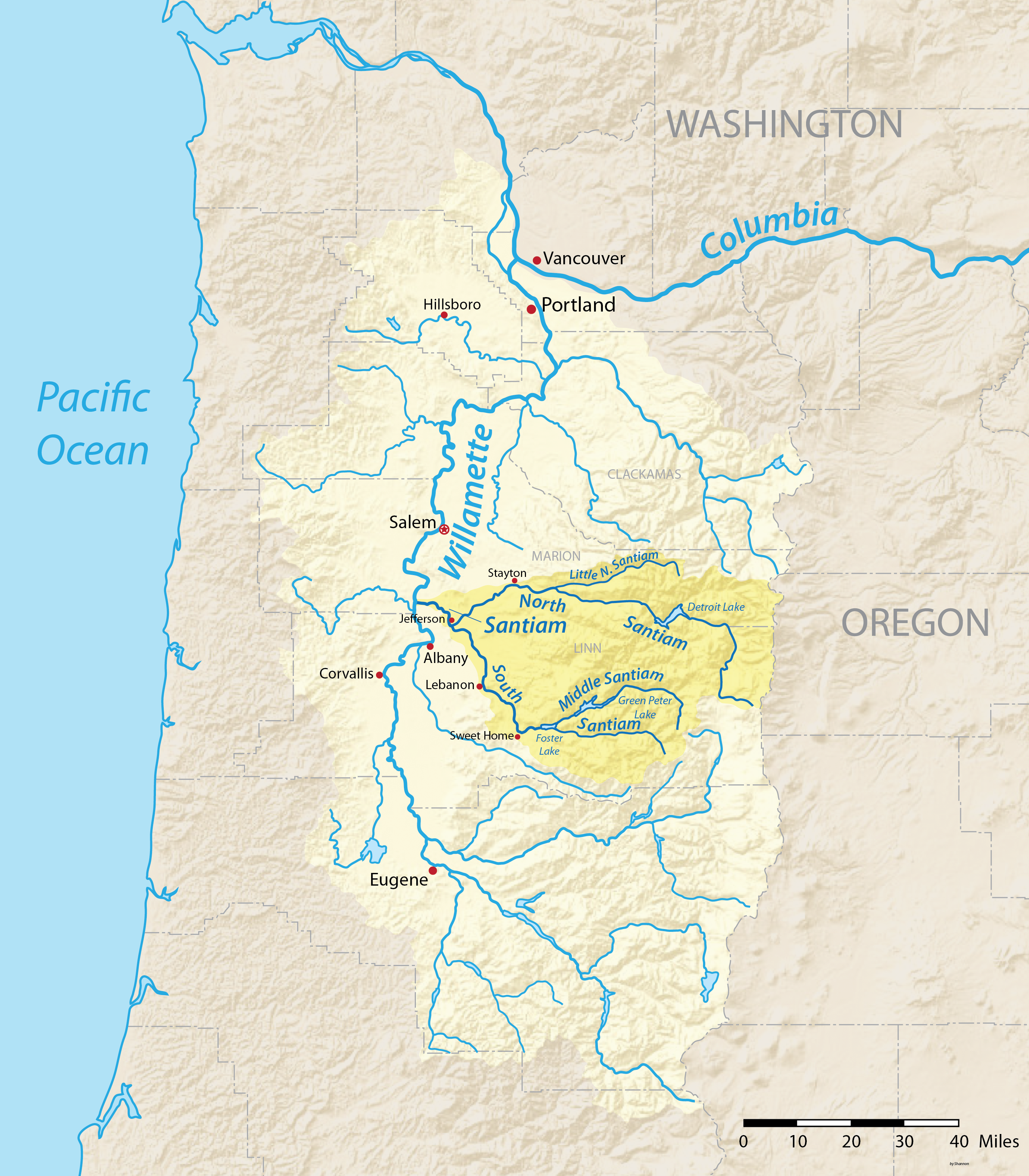
- Map of the Willamette River watershed with the Santiam River highlighted

- Location of the mouth of the Santiam River in Oregon
- Etymology: Kalapuya tribe that lived near the river until removal to the Grande Ronde Reservation

Location
- Country: United States
- State: Oregon
- County: Linn and Marion

Physical characteristics
- Source: confluence of North Santiam and South Santiam rivers
  - location: Linn and Marion counties, Oregon
  - coordinates: 44°41′21″N 123°00′27″W
  - elevation: 222 ft (68 m)
- Mouth: Willamette River
  - location: between Albany and Salem, Marion County, Willamette Valley, Oregon
  - coordinates: 44°45′00″N 123°08′20″W
  - elevation: 164 ft (50 m)
- Length: 12 mi (19 km) (Note: The maps include river mile (RM) markers for the river's entire length. From mouth to source they depict the Monmouth, Sydney, and Albany Oregon quadrants.)
- Basin size: 1,830 sq mi (4,700 km^{2})
- Discharge
  - location: Jefferson
  - average: 7,714 cu ft/s (218.4 m^{3}/s)
  - minimum: 260 cu ft/s (7.4 m^{3}/s)
  - maximum: 202,000 cu ft/s (5,700 m^{3}/s)

The Santiam River /ˌsæntiːˈæm/ is a tributary of the Willamette River, about 12 miles (19 km) long, in western Oregon in the United States. Through its two principal tributaries, the North Santiam and the South Santiam rivers, it drains a large area of the Cascade Range at the eastern side of the Willamette Valley east of Salem and Corvallis.

== Watershed ==
The main course of the river is short, formed in the Willamette Valley by the confluence of the North and South Santiam rivers on the border between Linn and Marion counties, approximately 8 miles (13 km) northeast of Albany. The river flows generally west-northwest in a slow, meandering course to join the Willamette approximately 8 miles (13 km) north of Albany.

Both the North and South Santiam rise in high Cascades in eastern Linn County. The Middle Santiam River joins the South Santiam where the South Santiam is impounded to form Foster Lake. The Middle Santiam is itself impounded, to form Green Peter Reservoir. The North Santiam is impounded to form the 400-foot (120 m) deep Detroit Lake in the Cascades.

Main tributaries of the North Santiam River are the Little North Santiam and Breitenbush rivers. Major tributaries of the South Santiam include Thomas Creek, Crabtree Creek, and the Middle Santiam.

Cities built along the Santiam include Jefferson, on the main course; Stayton, Mehama, Mill City, and Gates, on the North Santiam; and Lebanon and Sweet Home on the South Santiam. Two former cities on the main course, Syracuse and Santiam City, were washed away in the floods of 1861 to 1862.

The North Santiam is a major source of tap water for the cities of Salem and Stayton. The South Santiam provides water for the cities of Lebanon, Sweet Home, and, via a canal dug in the 1870s, Albany. The main river provides water for Jefferson.

Conservation efforts in the Santiam watershed are led by the South Santiam Watershed Council and the North Santiam Watershed Council.

== History ==
The land surrounding the Santiam forks is the historic homeland of the Santiam bands of the Kalapuya. Chief Alaquema (aka Joe Hutchins) of the Chiwean or Northern Band of the Santiam negotiated with U.S. representative John Gain at the Santiam Treaty Council in 1851 before the forced removal of the Santiam and other Kalapuya tribes to the Grande Ronde reservation. After days of arguing, Alaquema told Gain, "We understand fully what you mean and that it may be better for us, but our minds are made up." He pointed to the land between the fork of the river on a map and said, "We wish to reserve this piece of land. We do not wish to leave this. We would rather be shot on it than removed."

Negotiating for Tiacan's Band was Tiacan himself, or Louis, who according to the Santiam treaty at 1851 and the Willamette Valley Treaty of 1855 was the principal chief of the Santiam Kalapuyans. The Santiam treaty was never ratified, and in 1856 the Santiam were later forced to leave the land between the forks of the Santiam River that they had fought to preserve for themselves.

The main ferries over the Santiam during the early period of American settlement were at Syracuse and Santiam City and, later, upstream from Jefferson. Bridges have long since replaced the ferries.

== Fire district ==
Santiam River Zone is staffed by the Santiam Type 2 initial attack hand crew and two engines based out of the Detroit Ranger District. Additionally the Willamette National Forest has fire crews on the Mckenzie and Middle Fork Ranger Districts.

== See also ==
- List of Oregon rivers
- Willamette Riverkeeper
