= Lacomb, Oregon =

Unincorporated community in the state of Oregon, United States

- Census-designated place
- Location within Oregon Location within the United States
- Coordinates: 44°35′04″N 122°44′30″W
- Country: United States
- State: Oregon
- County: Linn

Area
  - Total: 3.98 sq mi (10.31 km^{2})
  - Land: 3.98 sq mi (10.31 km^{2})
  - Water: 0 sq mi (0.00 km^{2})
- Elevation: 679 ft (207 m)

Population (2020)
  - Total: 575
  - Density: 144.4/sq mi (55.74/km^{2})
- Time zone: UTC-8 (Pacific (PST))
  - Summer (DST): UTC-7 (PDT)
- ZIP code: 97355
- Area codes: 458 and 541
- FIPS code: 41-40150
- GNIS feature ID: 2584418

Lacomb is a census-designated place and unincorporated community in Linn County, Oregon, United States, located about 10 miles (16 km) northeast of Lebanon. It was named in December 1889 by W.J. Turnidge, a son of a pioneer. As of the 2020 census, Lacomb had a population of 575.

== Demographics ==
Historical population
Census	Pop.	Note	%±
2020	575		—
U.S. Decennial Census

== Climate ==
According to the Köppen Climate Classification system, Lacomb has a warm-summer mediterranean climate, abbreviated "Csb" on climate maps. The hottest temperature recorded in Lacomb was 113 °F (45.0 °C) on June 29, 2021, while the coldest temperature recorded was 1 °F (−17.2 °C) on January 1, 1979.

Climate data for Lacomb, Oregon, 1991–2020 normals, extremes 1973–present
Month	Jan	Feb	Mar	Apr	May	Jun	Jul	Aug	Sep	Oct	Nov	Dec	Year
Record high °F (°C)	69 (21)	73 (23)	80 (27)	88 (31)	97 (36)	113 (45)	105 (41)	104 (40)	101 (38)	91 (33)	73 (23)	70 (21)	113 (45)
Mean maximum °F (°C)	59.7 (15.4)	61.7 (16.5)	69.1 (20.6)	76.5 (24.7)	85.0 (29.4)	89.1 (31.7)	95.1 (35.1)	96.0 (35.6)	91.5 (33.1)	77.6 (25.3)	63.9 (17.7)	58.0 (14.4)	98.7 (37.1)
Mean daily maximum °F (°C)	46.6 (8.1)	50.4 (10.2)	55.1 (12.8)	59.7 (15.4)	66.7 (19.3)	72.1 (22.3)	81.1 (27.3)	81.8 (27.7)	75.7 (24.3)	63.0 (17.2)	51.6 (10.9)	45.3 (7.4)	62.4 (16.9)
Daily mean °F (°C)	40.0 (4.4)	42.0 (5.6)	45.2 (7.3)	48.8 (9.3)	54.8 (12.7)	59.4 (15.2)	65.5 (18.6)	65.5 (18.6)	60.8 (16.0)	51.9 (11.1)	44.1 (6.7)	39.3 (4.1)	51.4 (10.8)
Mean daily minimum °F (°C)	33.3 (0.7)	33.5 (0.8)	35.2 (1.8)	37.9 (3.3)	42.9 (6.1)	46.7 (8.2)	49.8 (9.9)	49.3 (9.6)	45.8 (7.7)	40.9 (4.9)	36.7 (2.6)	33.2 (0.7)	40.4 (4.7)
Mean minimum °F (°C)	22.4 (−5.3)	23.8 (−4.6)	27.0 (−2.8)	29.6 (−1.3)	33.2 (0.7)	39.3 (4.1)	43.1 (6.2)	42.4 (5.8)	37.9 (3.3)	29.8 (−1.2)	26.0 (−3.3)	21.8 (−5.7)	17.5 (−8.1)
Record low °F (°C)	1 (−17)	5 (−15)	20 (−7)	25 (−4)	28 (−2)	32 (0)	38 (3)	36 (2)	31 (−1)	18 (−8)	15 (−9)	2 (−17)	1 (−17)
Average precipitation inches (mm)	7.50 (191)	5.82 (148)	6.45 (164)	5.46 (139)	3.83 (97)	2.90 (74)	0.55 (14)	0.61 (15)	2.28 (58)	5.15 (131)	7.89 (200)	8.79 (223)	57.23 (1,454)
Average snowfall inches (cm)	0.3 (0.76)	0.9 (2.3)	0.1 (0.25)	0.0 (0.0)	0.0 (0.0)	0.0 (0.0)	0.0 (0.0)	0.0 (0.0)	0.0 (0.0)	0.0 (0.0)	0.0 (0.0)	0.4 (1.0)	1.7 (4.31)
Average precipitation days (≥ 0.01 in)	18.7	16.7	18.5	17.7	13.9	9.8	3.2	3.2	6.9	13.4	19.1	20.4	161.5
Average snowy days (≥ 0.1 in)	0.2	0.5	0.1	0.0	0.0	0.0	0.0	0.0	0.0	0.0	0.0	0.3	1.1
Source 1: NOAA
Source 2: XMACIS2
