= South Santiam River =

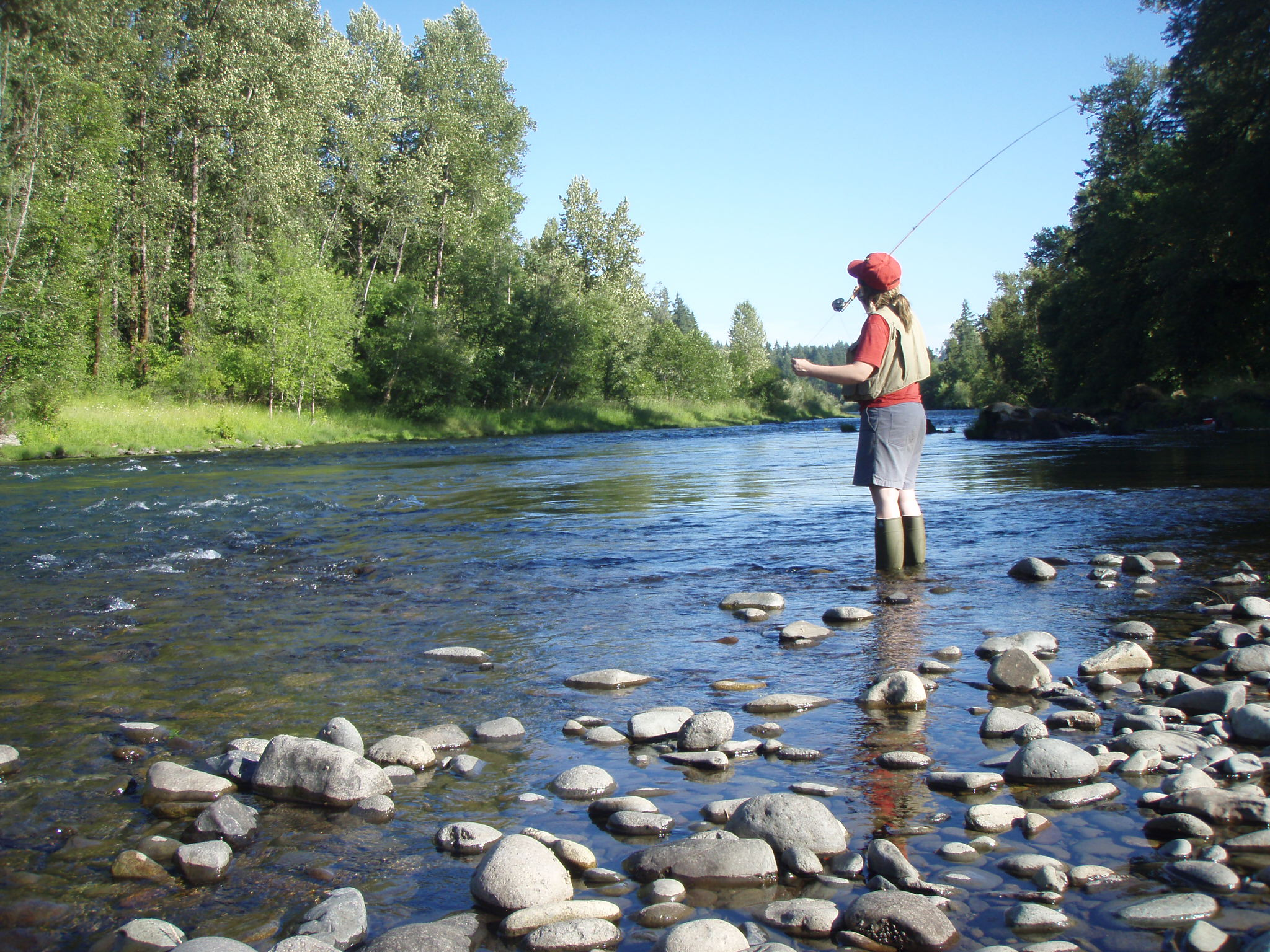
- Fly fishing on the South Santiam River just downstream of Sweet Home

- Location of the mouth of the South Santiam River in Oregon
- Etymology: Kalapuya tribe that lived near the river until removal to the Grande Ronde Reservation

Location
- Country: United States
- State: Oregon
- County: Linn

Physical characteristics
- Source: Jumpoff Joe Mountain
  - location: Cascade Range, Willamette National Forest, Linn County, Oregon
  - coordinates: 44°22′27″N 122°13′05″W
  - elevation: 1,932 ft (589 m)
- Mouth: Santiam River
  - location: Willamette Valley, Linn County, Oregon
  - coordinates: 44°41′12″N 123°00′24″W
  - elevation: 217 ft (66 m)
- Length: 69 mi (111 km)
- Basin size: 1,040 sq mi (2,700 km^{2})
- Discharge
  - location: Waterloo, 23.3 miles (37.5 km) above the mouth
  - average: 2,946 cu ft/s (83.4 m^{3}/s)
  - minimum: 67 cu ft/s (1.9 m^{3}/s)
  - maximum: 95,200 cu ft/s (2,700 m^{3}/s)

The South Santiam River is a tributary of the Santiam River, about 69 miles (111 km) long, in western Oregon in the United States. It drains an area of the Cascade Range into the Willamette Valley east of Corvallis.

It rises in the Cascades in southeastern Linn County in the Willamette National Forest at 44.374291°N 122.218128°W. From this source, the confluence of Sevenmile and Latiwi creeks, it flows briefly north, then generally west through the Western Cascades and Cascadia. It then flows a handful of miles before entering Foster Reservoir. At Foster Reservoir the Middle Santiam River joins the South Santiam. Downstream from the reservoir it flows west past Sweet Home, where it turns northwest, passing through the foothills into the Willamette Valley near Lebanon. It joins the North Santiam River from the southeast to form the Santiam approximately 15 mi (24 km) northwest of Lebanon, about 10 miles (16 km) east of the confluence of the Santiam with the Willamette River.

U.S. Route 20 follows the valley of the river from near its headwaters in the mountains to the Willamette Valley northwest of Lebanon.

== Tributaries ==
Named tributaries from source to mouth are Sevenmile and Latiwi creeks at the headwaters, then Three, Sheep, Elk, Soda Fork, Stewart, and Keith creeks. Then come Boulder, Little Boulder, Trout, Falls, Moose, Canyon, and Wolfe creeks. Further downstream are Dobbin, Soda, Cabin, Bucksnort, Mouse, and Deer creeks.

Below those are Shot Pouch Creek and the Middle Santiam River. Then come Ralston, Gadney, Wiley, Ames, Roaring, McDowell, Hamilton, and Onehorse creeks followed by Spring Branch. Entering the lower reaches of the river are Crabtree, Thomas, and Mill creeks, and the North Santiam River.

== See also ==
- List of longest streams of Oregon
- List of rivers of Oregon
- Willamette Riverkeeper
