= Santiam Junior/Senior High School =

School in Mill City, Oregon, U.S.

Location
- 300 SW Cedar St; Mill City, Linn County, Oregon 97360; United States
- Coordinates: 44.7523°N 122.4795°W

Information
- Type: Public
- School district: Santiam Canyon School District
- Principal: Todd Miller
- Teaching staff: 16.66 (FTE)
- Grades: 6–12
- Enrollment: 278 (2017–18)
- Student to teacher ratio: 16.69
- Colors: Red, black, and white
- Athletics conference: OSAA Tri-River Conference 2A-3
- Mascot: Wolverine
- Website: shs.santiam.k12.or.us

Santiam Junior/Senior High School is a public high school in Mill City, Oregon, United States. It was previously Santiam High School until it was turned into a Junior/Senior High School when the Gates Elementary School was shut down due to budget cuts. The school serves students in grades 6–12, in Mill City and the neighboring towns of Detroit, Gates, Idanha, and Marion Forks.

== History ==
Santiam Junior/Senior High School was built in 2020, funded by a 2019 $17.9 million bond and additional grants and donations that added up to about $26 million. The new School replaced Santiam Middle School and Santiam High School.

The new school building survived the 2020 Santiam Fire. The first class of students began attending classes there in February 2021.

== Academics ==
In 2008, 52% of the school's seniors received their high school diploma. Of 56 students, 29 graduated, 15 dropped out, 7 received a modified diploma, and 5 were still in high school.
