= Oregon Route 226 =

State highway in western Oregon, US

Oregon Route 226
- Albany–Lyons Highway No. 211
- Route 226 highlighted in red

Route information
- Maintained by ODOT
- Length: 25.14 mi (40.46 km)

Major junctions
- South end: US 20 near Albany
- North end: OR 22 at Mehama

Location
- Country: United States
- State: Oregon
- Counties: Linn, Marion

Highway system
- Oregon Highways; Interstate; US; State; Named; Scenic
← OR 225	→ OR 227

Oregon Route 226 is an Oregon state highway that runs between a point east of Albany in the Willamette Valley, and the town of Mehama along the Santiam River. The highway is also known as the Albany–Lyons Highway No. 211 (see Oregon highways and routes), and is 25 miles (40 km) long. It lies mostly within Linn County, except for the very northernmost segment in Mehama, which is in Marion County.

== Route description ==
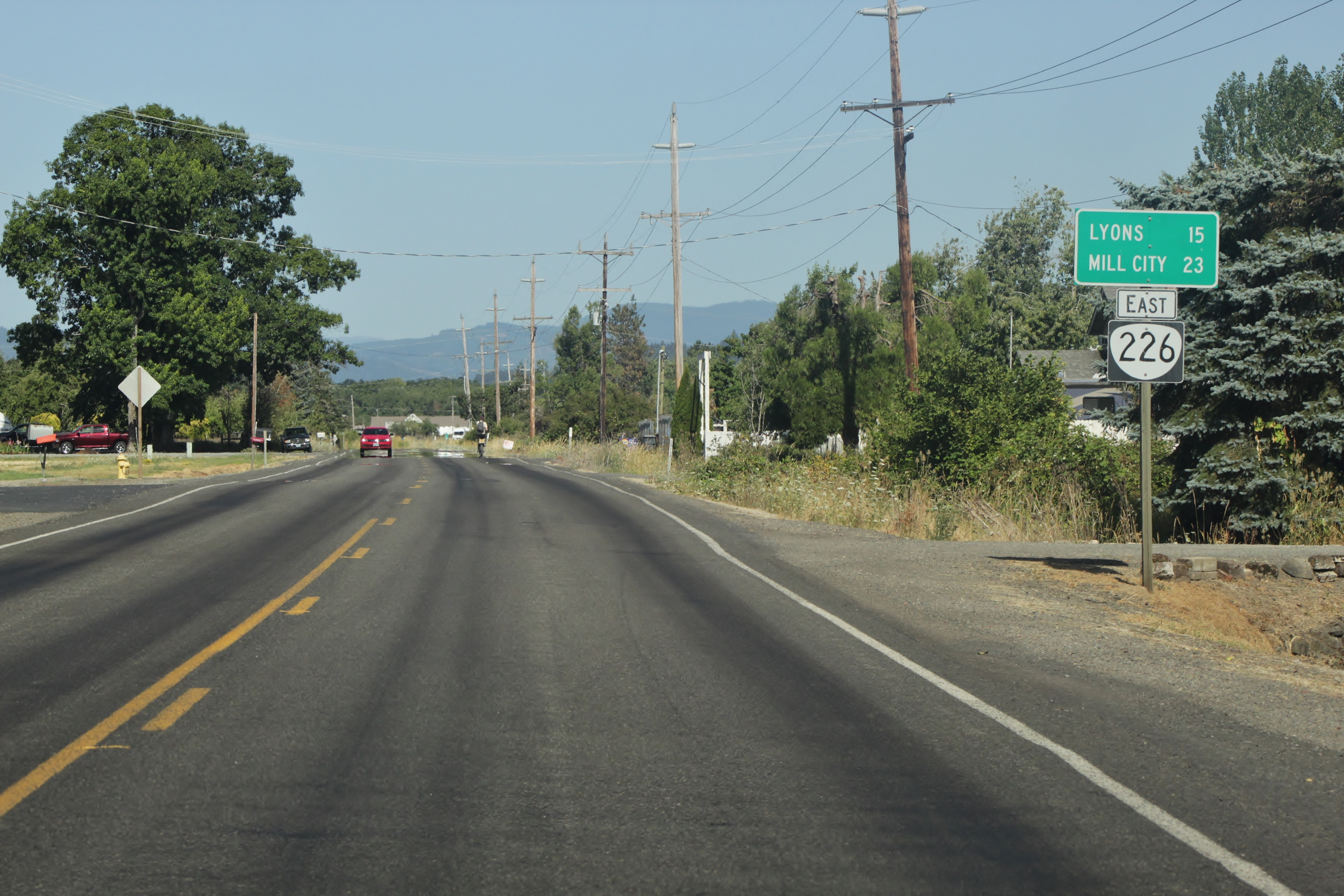
OR 226 near Scio

Oregon Route 226 begins at its junction with U.S. Route 20, several miles east of Albany. It heads in a general northeasterly direction, passing through the town of Scio, continuing to the east until it reaches the city of Lyons on the south bank of the Santiam River. The highway then turns north, crossing the river into Mehama, and ending at an intersection with Oregon Route 22.

== Major intersections ==
County	Location	mi	km	Destinations	Notes
Linn		0.00	0.00	US 20 – Lebanon, Albany	
Marion	Mehama	25.14	40.46	OR 22 – Mill City, Stayton, Salem, Detroit	
1.000 mi = 1.609 km; 1.000 km = 0.621 mi
