= Niagara County Park =

Park in Oregon, United States

- Location within the United States
- Location: Oregon, U.S.
- Nearest city: Salem
- Coordinates: 44°45′23″N 122°20′02″W
- Area: 60 acres (24 ha)
- Established: 1961
- Governing body: Marion County Public Works

Niagara County Park is a park located in the U.S. state of Oregon on the North Santiam River, 40 miles (64 km) east of Salem on the North Santiam Highway, Oregon Route 22. It is 7 miles (11 km) east of Mill City. The park protects the ruins of a rubble dam and a variety of indigenous plant species. Walking trails include Powder House, Fern Glen and Wildflower Loop.

== History ==
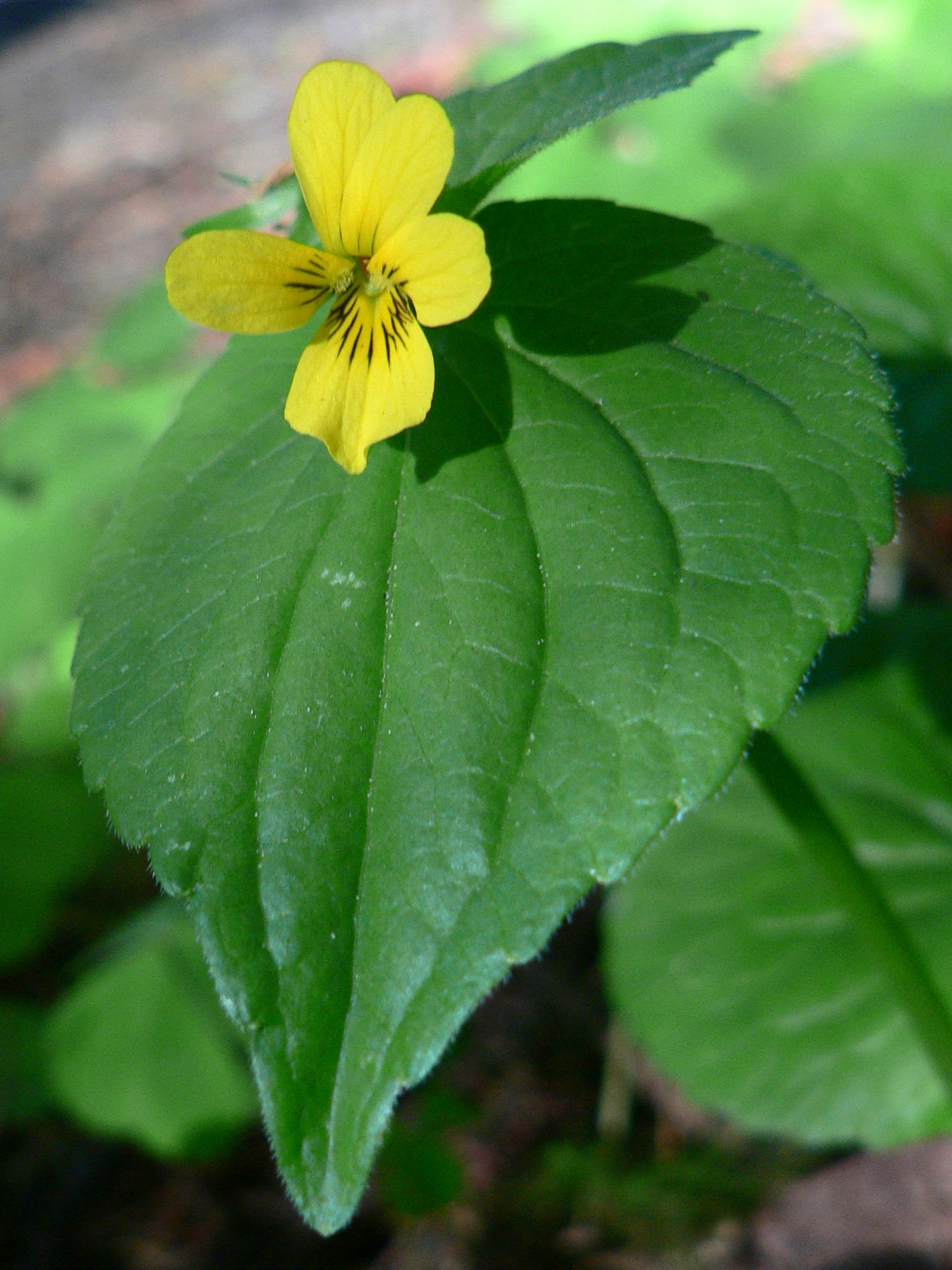
Pioneer Violet (Viola glabella) is a common bloom in May

The area acquired its name in September 1890 when a townsite was platted followed by the establishment of the Niagara post office in October of that year. In the late 1890s, a rubble masonry dam was started. Its purpose was to power a mill intended to make paper from straw. At stages, the river flowed through a cleft only 4.25 feet (1.3 m) wide. Difficulties in constructing the dam caused the paper mill project to be abandoned. Hydroelectric development continued at intervals, but floods and erosion caused the project to be abandoned in 1912 after approximately $100,000 had been spent.

At the beginning of the 20th century, Niagara had a large store, hotel, numerous dwellings, and a tavern. It was briefly notable as the location of the smallest post office in the United States at 6 feet by 8 feet. The post office was discontinued June 14, 1934.

== Geography ==
The park marks the transition from the narrow upstream canyon, the site of Big Cliff and Detroit Dams, and the wider downstream valley populated with villages and small farms. Adjoining land north of the park is privately held. Land south of the park is managed by the Oregon State Board of Forestry.
