= 1970 Atlanta Falcons season =

NFL team season

- Owner: Rankin M. Smith Sr.
- General manager: Norm Van Brocklin
- Head coach: Norm Van Brocklin
- Home stadium: Atlanta Stadium

Results
- Record: 4–8–2
- Division place: 3rd NFC West
- Playoffs: Did not qualify

The 1970 Atlanta Falcons season was the franchise's fifth year in the National Football League (NFL). The team failed to improve on their previous season's output of 6–8, winning only four games. They failed to reach the playoffs for the fifth straight season. The team began its season by winning two of its first three games. However, following their 21–20 win over the San Francisco 49ers the Falcons went 2–7–2 in their final 11 games. The Falcons are the most recent NFL to have tie games in two straight weeks.

== Offseason ==
=== NFL draft ===
1970 Atlanta Falcons draft
Round	Pick	Player	Position	College	Notes
1	12	John Small	Linebacker	The Citadel	
2	39	Art Malone	Running back	Arizona State	
3	64	Andy Maurer	Guard	Oregon	
3	65	Todd Snyder	Wide receiver	Ohio	from N. Y. Giants
4	84	Paul Reed	Tackle	Johnson C. Smith	from Philadelphia
5	112	Bruce Van Ness	Running back	Rutgers	from Philadelphia via N. Y. Giants
5	116	Ken Mendenhall	Center	Oklahoma	
6	143	Mack Herron	Running back	Kansas State	
6	147	Jade Butcher	Wide receiver	Indiana	from Washington
6	152	Randy Marshall	Defensive end	Linfield	from Los Angeles
Made roster * Made at least one Pro Bowl during career

== Personnel ==
=== Staff / Coaches ===
1970 Atlanta Falcons staff
Front office: Chairman of the board – Rankin M. Smith Sr.; President – Frank E. Wall; General manager – Norm Van Brocklin; Head coaches: Head coach – Norm Van Brocklin; Offensive coaches: Offensive backfield – Walt Yowarsky; Receivers – Harry Gilmer; Offensive line – Duane Putnam	Defensive coaches: Head defensive – Marion Campbell; Defensive line – Bob Griffin; Defensive backfield – Fred Bruney

=== Roster ===
1970 Atlanta Falcons roster
Quarterbacks (QB): 17 Bob Berry; 11 Randy Johnson; Running backs (RB): 33 Jim Butler; 45 Sonny Campbell; 40 Paul Gipson; 25 Art Malone; 5 Harmon Wages; Wide receivers (WR): 19 Mike Brunson; 85 Paul Flatley; 80 Todd Snyder; Tight ends (TE): 84 Mike Donohoe; 86 Jim Mitchell	Offensive linemen (OL): 63 Dick Enderle G; 68 Dave Hettema T; 75 George Kunz T; 53 John Matlock C; 64 Andy Maurer G; 62 Gary Roberts G; 67 Malcolm Snider T; 57 Jeff Van Note C; Defensive linemen (DL): 88 Glen Condren DT; 87 Claude Humphrey DE; 72 Greg Lens DT; 89 Randy Marshall DE; 66 John Small DT; 71 John Zook DE	Linebackers (LB): 54 Grady Allen OLB; 51 Ted Cottrell OLB; 59 Dean Halverson OLB; 58 Don Hansen MLB; 60 Tommy Nobis OLB; Defensive backs (DB): 32 Grady Cavness; 28 Mike Freeman CB/FS; 49 Al Lavan SS; 22 John Mallory SS; 20 Tom McCauley FS; 36 Ken Reaves CB; 47 Rudy Redmond CB; Special teams (ST): 26 Billy Lothridge P; 8 Ken Vinyard K	Practice squad: 24 Kent Lawrence WR; 69 Mike Lewis DE; Reserve: 52 Ron Acks LB (IR); 65 Bob Breitenstein T (IR); 50 Greg Brezina LB (IR); 15 Gail Cogdill WR (IR); 79 Carlton Dabney DT (IR); 61 Bill Sandeman T (IR); 74 Jim Sullivan DT (IR); -- Francis Winkler C (IR); -- Randy Winkler G (Military); Rookies in italics

== Regular season ==
=== Schedule ===
Week	Date	Opponent	Result	Record	Venue	Attendance	Recap
1	September 20	at **New Orleans Saints**	**W** 14–3	1–0	Tulane Stadium	77,042	Recap
2	September 27	at Green Bay Packers	**L** 24–27	1–1	Lambeau Field	56,263	Recap
3	October 4	**San Francisco 49ers**	**W** 21–20	2–1	Atlanta Stadium	58,850	Recap
4	October 11	at Dallas Cowboys	**L** 0–13	2–2	Cotton Bowl	53,611	Recap
5	October 18	at Denver Broncos	**L** 10–24	2–3	Mile High Stadium	50,705	Recap
6	October 25	**New Orleans Saints**	**W** 32–14	3–3	Atlanta Stadium	58,850	Recap
7	November 1	Chicago Bears	**L** 14–23	3–4	Atlanta Stadium	58,850	Recap
8	November 8	at **Los Angeles Rams**	**T** 10–10	3–4–1	Los Angeles Memorial Coliseum	67,232	Recap
9	November 15	at Philadelphia Eagles	**T** 13–13	3–4–2	Franklin Field	55,425	Recap
10	November 22	**Los Angeles Rams**	**L** 7–17	3–5–2	Atlanta Stadium	58,850	Recap
11	November 30	Miami Dolphins	**L** 7–20	3–6–2	Atlanta Stadium	54,036	Recap
12	December 6	at **San Francisco 49ers**	**L** 20–24	3–7–2	Kezar Stadium	41,387	Recap
13	December 13	Pittsburgh Steelers	**W** 27–16	4–7–2	Atlanta Stadium	54,162	Recap
14	December 20	Minnesota Vikings	**L** 7–37	4–8–2	Atlanta Stadium	57,992	Recap
Note: Intra-division opponents are in **bold** text.

=== Standings ===
NFC West
	W	L	T	PCT	DIV	CONF	PF	PA	STK
San Francisco 49ers	10	3	1	.769	3–2–1	6–3–1	352	267	W3
Los Angeles Rams	9	4	1	.692	4–1–1	7–3–1	325	202	W1
Atlanta Falcons	4	8	2	.333	3–2–1	3–6–2	206	261	L1
New Orleans Saints	2	11	1	.154	0–5–1	2–8–1	172	347	L6

Note: Tie games were not officially counted in the standings until 1972.
