= Randy Marsh =

Randy Marsh may refer to:

- Randy Marsh (umpire) (born 1949), American baseball umpire
- Randy Marsh (South Park), fictional character in the American adult animated sitcom South Park

== See also ==
- Randy Marshall (born 1946), American football player
