= Big Cliff Dam =

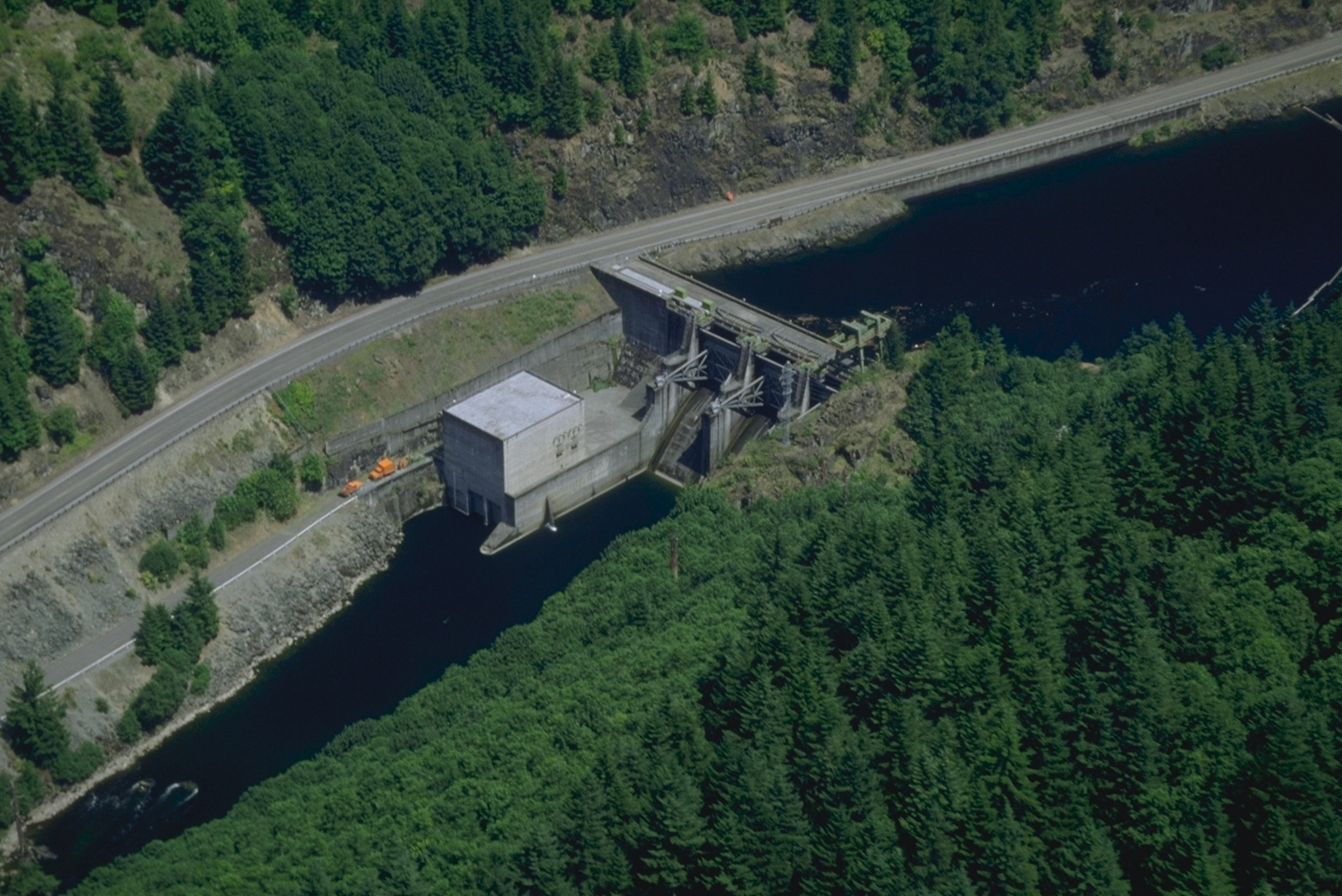
- Big Cliff Dam on the North Santiam River

- Location within Oregon
- Country: United States
- Location: Linn County–Marion County, Oregon
- Coordinates: 44°45′3.6″N 122°16′59.16″W
- Purpose: Power
- Status: Operational
- Construction began: 1949
- Opening date: 1953; 73 years ago
- Owner: U.S. Army Corps of Engineers

Dam and spillways
- Type of dam: Concrete gravity
- Impounds: North Santiam River
- Height: 191 ft (58 m)
- Length: 280 ft (85 m)
- Elevation at crest: 1,212 ft (369 m)

Reservoir
- Creates: Big Cliff Lake
- Total capacity: 6,450 acre⋅ft (7,960,000 m^{3})
- Surface area: 128 acres (0.52 km^{2})
- Maximum length: 2.8 mi (4.5 km)

Power Station
- Commission date: 1953
- Turbines: 1 x 18 MW Kaplan-type
- Installed capacity: 18 MW

Big Cliff Dam is a concrete gravity dam on the North Santiam River in the western part of the U.S. state of Oregon. The dam spans the Linn County–Marion County border in the Oregon Cascades.

The dam's primary functions are flood control, power generation, irrigation, fish habitat, water quality improvement, and recreation. It is one of 13 dams created by the U.S. Army Corps of Engineers under the Willamette Valley Project which was authorized by the Flood Control Act of 1938 to dam Oregon.

It was constructed between March 1949 and May 1953 at the same time as Detroit Dam. Big Cliff is 2.7 miles (4.3 km) river distance below Detroit Dam at river mile 47 of the North Santiam River.

Big Cliff smooths river flow resulting from power generation fluctuations of Detroit Dam, a practice known as river re-regulation. Big Cliff Reservoir, primarily known as Big Cliff Lake, has daily depth variations of up to 24 feet (7.3 m).

Big Cliff can generate up to 18 megawatts of power.

The dams' operators try to keep the water temperature in the 50 to 59 °F (10 to 15 °C) range for ideal fish habitat by mixing water from the top of Detroit Lake with water from the bottom.
