= Todd Snyder =

Todd Snyder may refer to:

- Todd Snyder (racing driver)
- Todd Snyder (fashion designer)
- Todd Snyder (American football)

== See also ==
- Todd Snider, American singer
