= Niagara, Oregon =

Unincorporated community in the state of Oregon, United States

- Unincorporated community
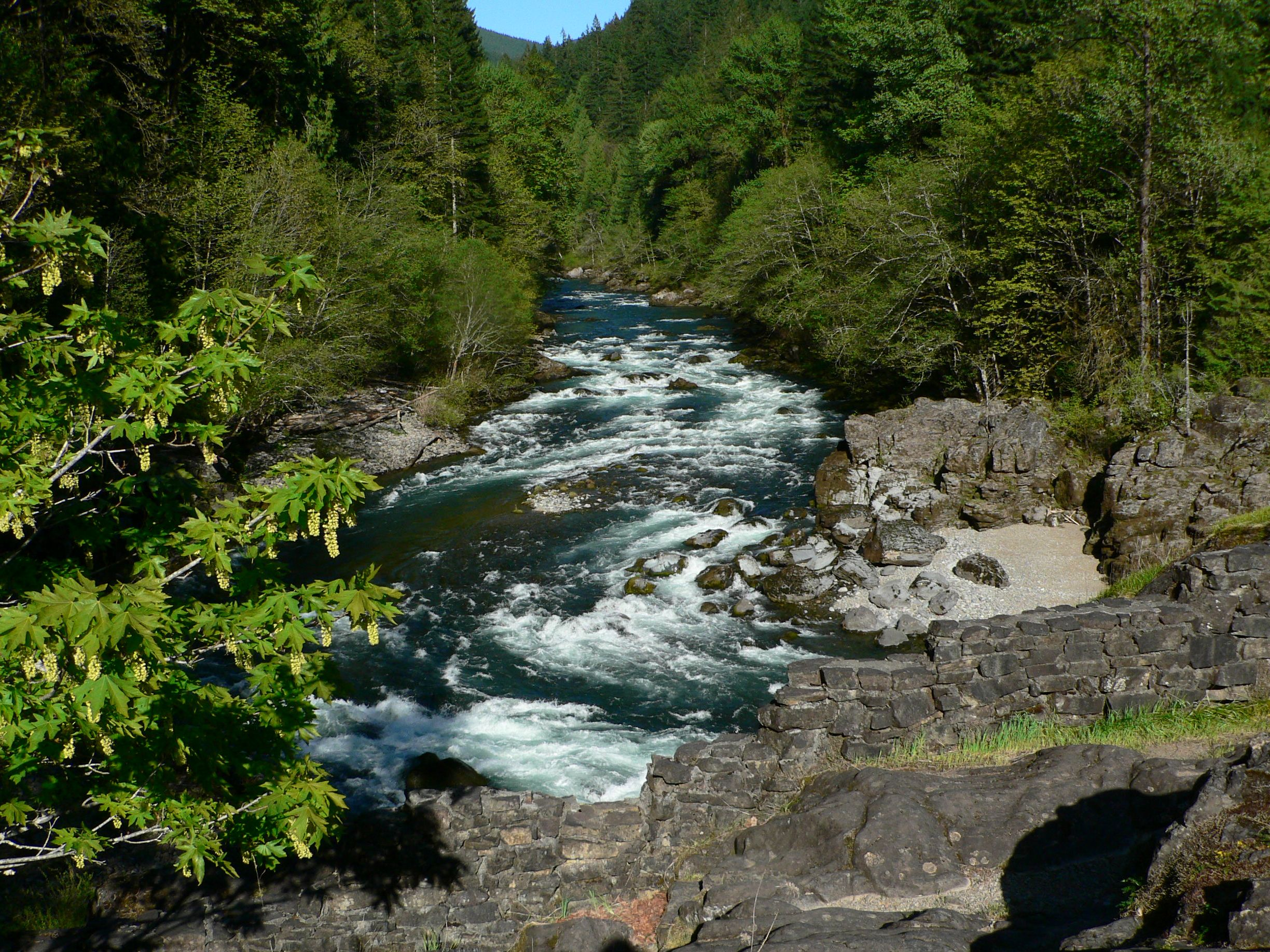
- The North Santiam River at Niagara County Park in Niagara

- Location within Oregon Location within the United States
- Coordinates: 44°45′28″N 122°20′10″W
- Country: United States
- State: Oregon
- County: Marion
- Elevation: 1,129 ft (344 m)
- Time zone: UTC-8 (Pacific (PST))
  - Summer (DST): UTC-7 (PDT)
- ZIP code: 97346
- Area codes: 503 and 971
- GNIS feature ID: 1166687

Niagara was an unincorporated community in Marion County, Oregon, United States. It was the site of the historic Niagara County Park, the first park to be created by the Marion County Park and Recreation Commission.

The park consisted of a historic dam, begun in the 1890s. A survey by the University of Oregon's engineering department reported that work on the dam had been abandoned by November 1904.

In September of 2020 it burned to the ground during a large wildfire and was replaced by homes in 2026.
