= Mongold Day-Use Area =

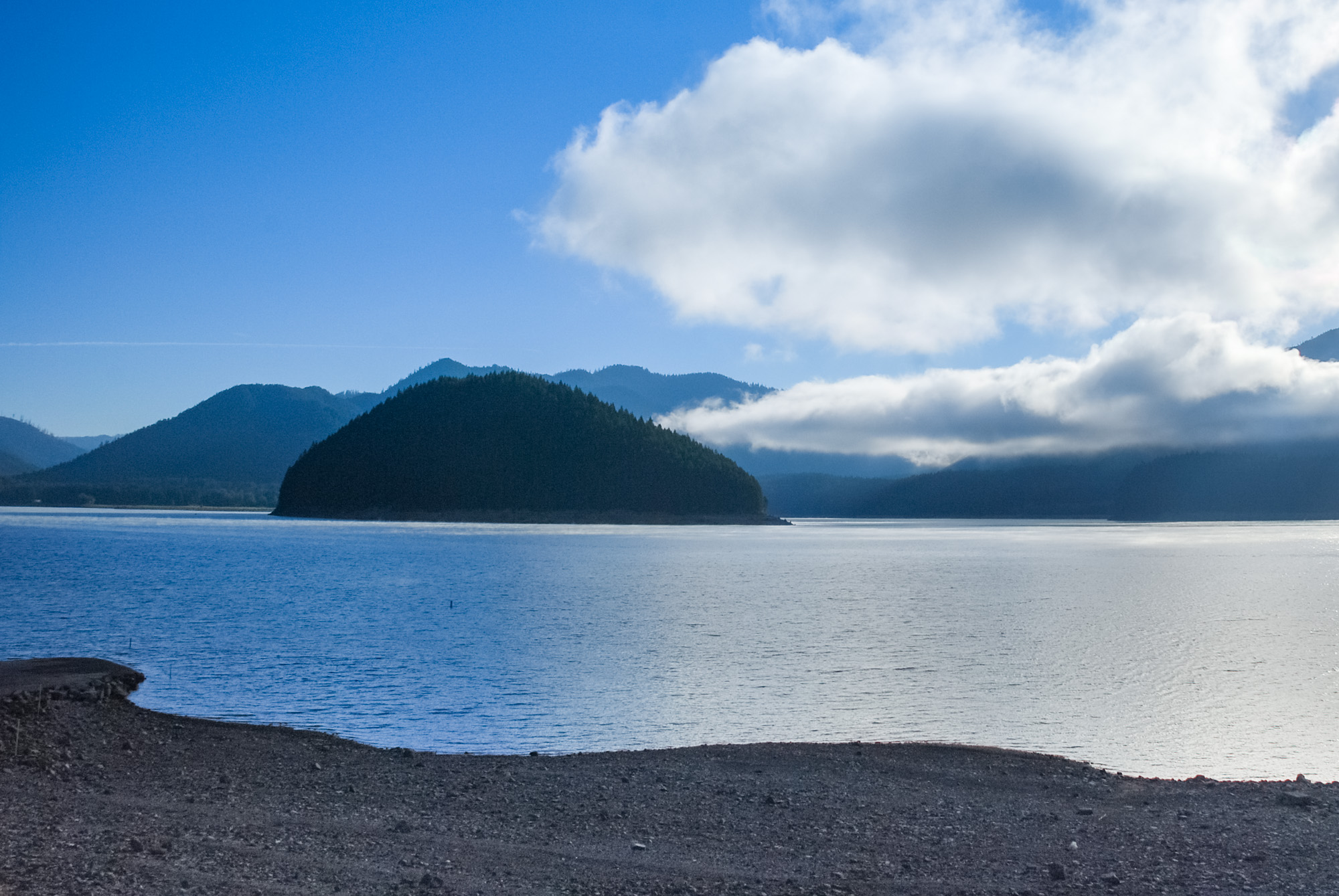
- Mongold State Park and Detroit Lake. Marion County.

- Location within Oregon Location within the United States
- Type: Public, state
- Location: Marion County, Oregon
- Nearest city: Salem
- Coordinates: 44°42′56″N 122°11′34″W
- Operator: Oregon Parks and Recreation Department

Mongold Day-Use Area is a state park in the U.S. state of Oregon, administered by the Oregon Parks and Recreation Department. It is located on Oregon Route 22 about 3.5 miles (5.6 km) west of the town of Detroit, Oregon. Because it is on the north shore of Detroit Lake, it is administered as part of Detroit Lake State Park, even though it is about 1.5 miles (2.4 km) west of the park's boundary.

Facilities include a boat ramp, swimming area, fishing area and picnic area.

== See also ==
- List of Oregon state parks
