= Idanha, Oregon =

- City
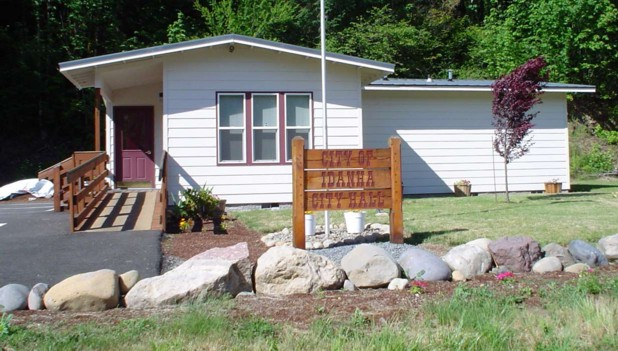
- Idanha City Hall

- Location in Oregon
- Coordinates: 44°42′10″N 122°05′03″W
- Country: United States
- State: Oregon
- Counties: Marion, Linn
- Incorporated: 1949

Government
  - Mayor: Tony Morones

Area
  - Total: 0.77 sq mi (2.00 km^{2})
  - Land: 0.74 sq mi (1.92 km^{2})
  - Water: 0.031 sq mi (0.08 km^{2})
- Elevation: 1,686 ft (514 m)

Population (2020)
  - Total: 156
  - Density: 210.9/sq mi (81.44/km^{2})
- Time zone: UTC-8 (Pacific)
  - Summer (DST): UTC-7 (Pacific)
- ZIP Code: 97350
- Area code: 503
- FIPS code: 41-35800
- GNIS feature ID: 2410094
- Website: www.cityofidanha.us

Idanha /ɪˈdænə/ is a city on the Marion County/Linn County line in Oregon, United States, on Oregon Route 22 and the North Santiam River. The population was 156 at the 2020 census.

The Marion County portion of Idanha is part of the Salem Metropolitan Statistical Area, while the Linn County portion is part of the Albany–Lebanon Micropolitan Statistical Area.

In 2015, the city's mayor, Cletus Moore, was arrested and charged with felony possession of methamphetamine.

== Geography ==
Idanha is in eastern Marion and Linn counties, with the North Santiam River forming the county line and separating the two settled areas within the town limits. The area on the southern, Linn County side is shown on U.S. Geological Survey maps as New Idanha. Oregon Route 22 runs along the northern, Marion County side of the river and leads west 56 miles (90 km) to Salem, the state capital. In the other direction Route 22 leads east and south 26 miles (42 km) to U.S. Route 20 at Santiam Junction.

According to the U.S. Census Bureau, the city of Idanha has a total area of 0.77 square miles (1.99 km^{2}), of which 0.03 square miles (0.08 km^{2}), or 4.15%, are water.

== History ==
The North Santiam River corridor was used by the Santiam Kalapuya for travel, food gathering, and trade, and was later traversed by Euro-American fur trappers. The locality at present-day Idanha was originally known as Muskrat Camp. A hotel served travelers, anglers, and hunters, and its proprietor adopted the name Idanha from a mineral-water brand bottled in Soda Springs, Idaho.

The Oregon Pacific Railroad was intended to cross the Cascade Range and continue east toward Idaho. Its tracks reached Idanha at the end of December 1889, but the company entered receivership in October 1890 and construction east of the community was never resumed. As the eastern terminus of the completed line, Idanha became a departure point for hunting and fishing excursions into the Cascades.

Montana lumberman Andrew B. Hammond purchased the bankrupt railroad in 1894. Rather than continuing its proposed transcontinental route, Hammond developed it as a logging and lumber railroad serving timberlands, camps, and mills in the North Santiam Canyon. Following Hammond's death and the decline of his businesses during the Great Depression, Idanha was the location of the Mary's Creek Civilian Conservation Corps camp.

Construction of a state highway across the Cascades along portions of the former railroad corridor improved access to Idanha during the 1930s. Further federal investment followed with construction of Detroit Dam, which began in 1949 and was completed in 1953. The highway, Forest Service logging roads, and dam construction supported the expansion of Idanha's postwar timber industry, and several sawmill, shingle, and veneer companies operated in and around the community.

In 1949, residents debated whether Idanha should incorporate separately or become part of a combined municipality with nearby Detroit, much of whose original townsite was to be inundated by the dam reservoir. Voters rejected an initial joint-incorporation proposal and subsequently approved the separate incorporation of Idanha by a vote of 190 to 8. The Marion County court certified the result in December 1949. The Oregon Blue Book lists March 15, 1950, as the city's official incorporation date.

Changes in the management and harvesting of federal forests contributed to the closure of Idanha-area mills by the mid-1990s. Logging continued on a smaller scale, while the local economy increasingly served outdoor recreation and travelers using Oregon Route 22 to reach Detroit Lake, the Santiam Pass, and central Oregon.

=== Climate ===
This region experiences warm and dry summers, with no average monthly temperatures above 71.6 °F (22.0 °C). According to the Köppen Climate Classification system, Idanha has a warm-summer Mediterranean climate, abbreviated Csb on climate maps.

== Demographics ==
Historical population
Census	Pop.	Note	%±
1950	442		—
1960	295		−33.3%
1970	382		29.5%
1980	319		−16.5%
1990	289		−9.4%
2000	232		−19.7%
2010	134		−42.2%
2020	156		16.4%
U.S. Decennial Census

=== 2020 census ===
As of the 2020 census, Idanha had a population of 156. The median age was 49.5 years. 19.2% of residents were under the age of 18 and 22.4% of residents were 65 years of age or older. For every 100 females there were 102.6 males, and for every 100 females age 18 and over there were 110.0 males age 18 and over.

0% of residents lived in urban areas, while 100.0% lived in rural areas.

There were 74 households in Idanha, of which 35.1% had children under the age of 18 living in them. Of all households, 50.0% were married-couple households, 27.0% were households with a male householder and no spouse or partner present, and 8.1% were households with a female householder and no spouse or partner present. About 19.0% of all households were made up of individuals and 10.9% had someone living alone who was 65 years of age or older.

There were 89 housing units, of which 16.9% were vacant. Among occupied housing units, 70.3% were owner-occupied and 29.7% were renter-occupied. The homeowner vacancy rate was <0.1% and the rental vacancy rate was <0.1%.

Racial composition as of the 2020 census
Race	Number	Percentage
White	133	85.3%
Black or African American	0	0%
American Indian and Alaska Native	1	0.6%
Asian	0	0%
Native Hawaiian and Other Pacific Islander	0	0%
Some other race	9	5.8%
Two or more races	13	8.3%
Hispanic or Latino (of any race)	19	12.2%

=== 2010 census ===
As of the census of 2010, there were 134 people, 65 households, and 34 families living in the city. The population density was 126.4 inhabitants per square mile (48.8/km^{2}). There were 86 housing units at an average density of 81.1 per square mile (31.3/km^{2}). The racial makeup of the city was 96.3% White and 3.7% from two or more races. Hispanic or Latino of any race were 5.2% of the population.

There were 65 households, of which 12.3% had children under the age of 18 living with them, 46.2% were married couples living together, 1.5% had a female householder with no husband present, 4.6% had a male householder with no wife present, and 47.7% were non-families. 36.9% of all households were made up of individuals, and 12.3% had someone living alone who was 65 years of age or older. The average household size was 2.06 and the average family size was 2.62.

The median age in the city was 51.2 years. 11.2% of residents were under the age of 18; 5.8% were between the ages of 18 and 24; 12.6% were from 25 to 44; 52.2% were from 45 to 64; and 17.9% were 65 years of age or older. The gender makeup of the city was 56.7% male and 43.3% female.

=== 2000 census ===
As of the census of 2000, there were 232 people, 85 households, and 65 families living in the city. The population density was 222.0 inhabitants per square mile (85.7/km^{2}). There were 116 housing units at an average density of 111.0 per square mile (42.9/km^{2}). The racial makeup of the city was 92.67% White, 0.43% African American, 5.60% from other races, and 1.29% from two or more races. Hispanic or Latino of any race were 6.03% of the population.

There were 85 households, out of which 36.5% had children under the age of 18 living with them, 63.5% were married couples living together, 9.4% had a female householder with no husband present, and 23.5% were non-families. 16.5% of all households were made up of individuals, and 4.7% had someone living alone who was 65 years of age or older. The average household size was 2.73 and the average family size was 3.06.

In the city, the population was spread out, with 30.2% under the age of 18, 6.5% from 18 to 24, 30.2% from 25 to 44, 24.6% from 45 to 64, and 8.6% who were 65 years of age or older. The median age was 37 years. For every 100 females, there were 107.1 males. For every 100 females age 18 and over, there were 107.7 males.

The median income for a household in the city was $30,982, and the median income for a family was $32,500. Males had a median income of $22,250 versus $21,000 for females. The per capita income for the city was $12,405. About 12.5% of families and 17.1% of the population were below the poverty line, including 17.3% of those under the age of 18 and none of those 65 or over.

== Education ==
Idanha is served by the Santiam Canyon School District.

== Santiam Fire ==
Idanha was one of the small cities in the Santiam Canyon impacted by a group of wildfires which converged and were later known collectively as the Santiam Fire. The Lionshead Wildfire had ignited on August 16, 2020, within the nearby Willamette National Forest. It continued burning in the wilderness area with limited intervention by firefighters due to the difficult terrain, slowly growing in size until September 7, 2020, when strong east winds reaching 50 miles per hour (80 km/h) drove the wildfire east through the canyon in which the town of Idanha and several others are located. Chaotic evacuations were ordered during the night of September 7–8, 2020. The Idanha-Detroit Rural Fire Protection District, which serves the cities of Idanha and Detroit, was pivotal in notifying sleeping residents of the evacuations and attempting to manage numerous small fires which had sprung up due to electrical lines coming down in the strong wind, with limited success. Unfortunately the city of Detroit was almost entirely destroyed, and the fire department itself suffered the loss of their administrative office and two fire trucks. Over the coming days, the wildfire would converge with several others in the area and become known as the Santiam Wildfire, destroying 402,274 acres (162,795 ha), among the worst in Oregon's history.
