= Santiam Lake =

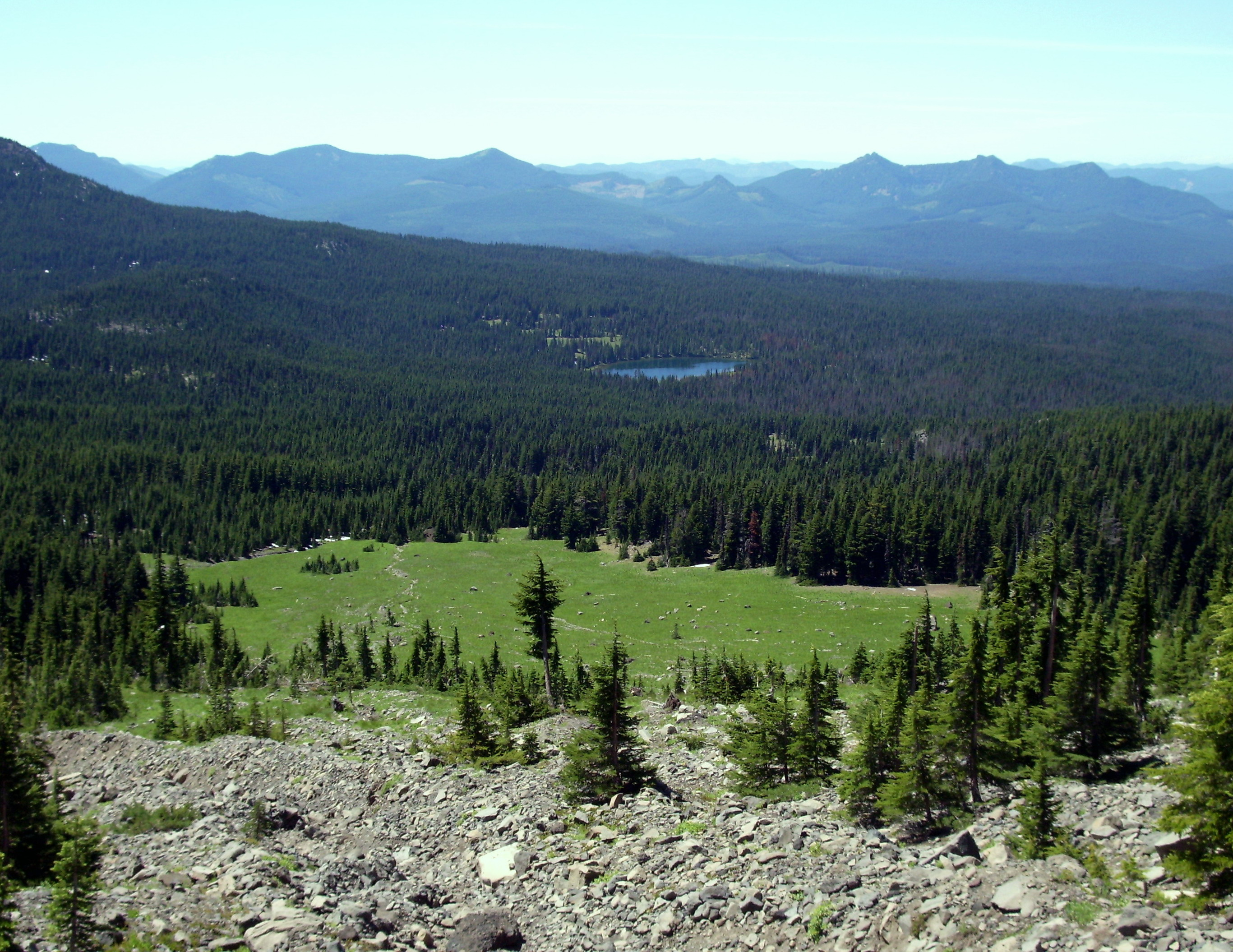
- The lake as seen from Three Fingered Jack

- Location within Oregon Location within the United States
- Location: Oregon Cascades NW of Santiam Pass, Linn County, Oregon, United States
- Coordinates: 44.47792°N 121.88496°W
- Type: Paternoster lake
- Primary outflows: North Santiam River
- Basin countries: United States
- Max. length: 1,000 ft (300 m)
- Max. width: 1,000 ft (300 m)
- Surface elevation: 5,124 ft (1,562 m)
- Frozen: winter and spring
- Islands: none
- Settlements: none

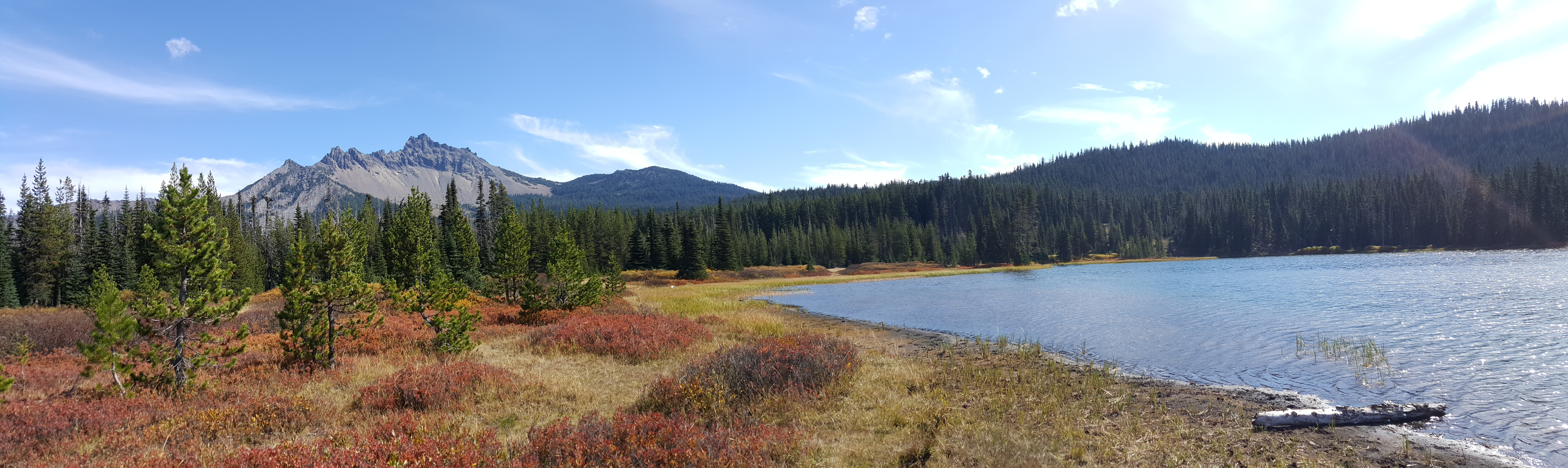
The view of Three Fingered Jack from Santiam Lake, as seen in early Autumn.

Santiam Lake is a lake in the U.S. state of Oregon, west of Three Fingered Jack in the Cascade Range. It is headwaters for the North Santiam River and drains a portion of the southwestern Mount Jefferson Wilderness. The lake is stocked bi-annually with Brook and Rainbow trout. It can be accessed from various trails in the Jefferson Wilderness, including Santiam Lake Trail #3491. It is located about 6.5 miles northwest of Santiam Junction, Oregon.

== See also ==
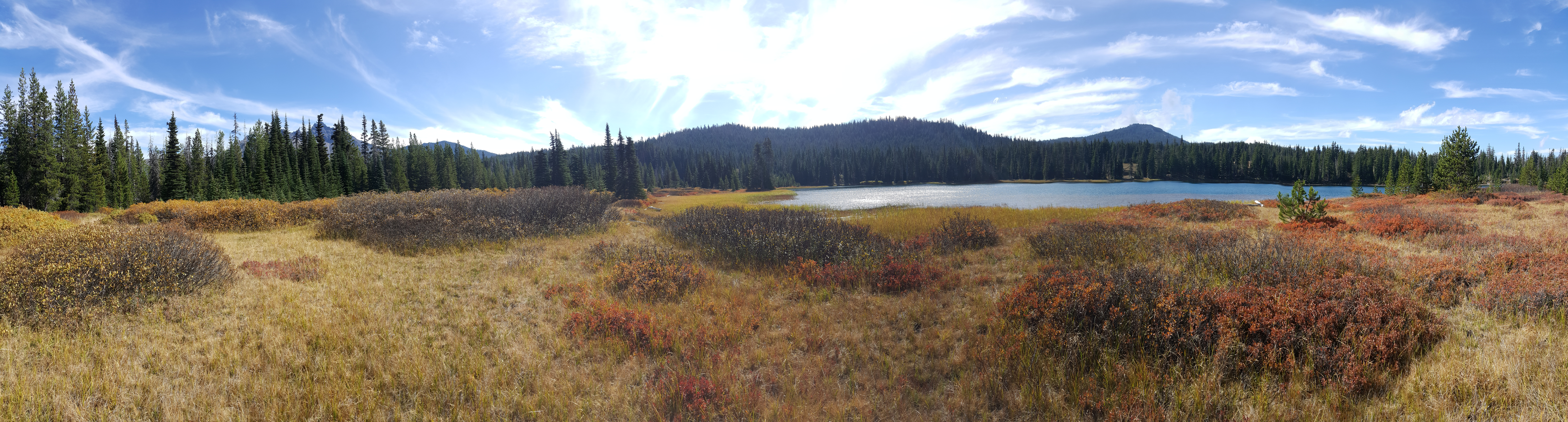
- Panoramic View of Santiam Lake in early Autumn.
  List of lakes in Oregon
