= Detroit Lake =

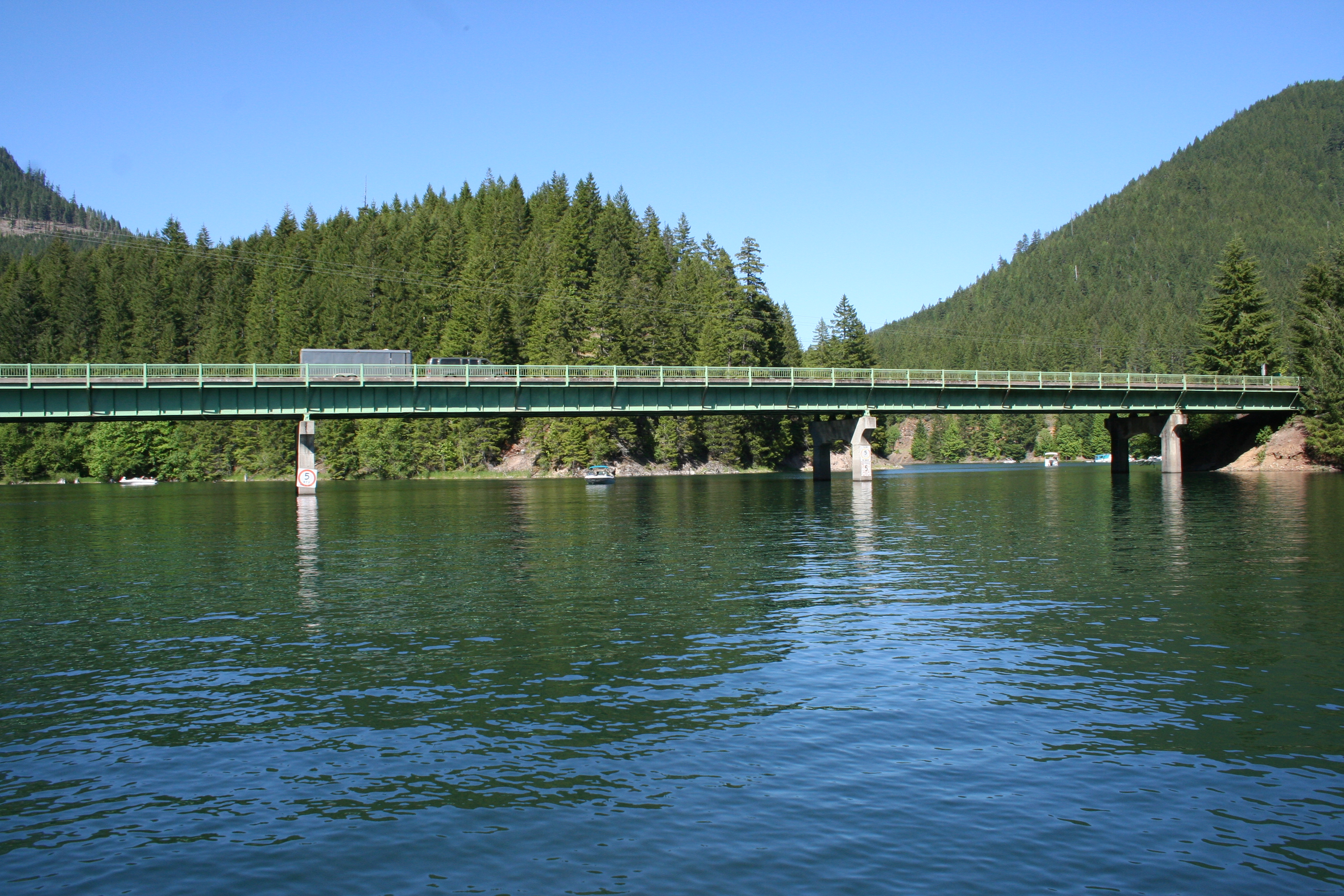
- Green Bridge over Detroit Lake

- Location within Oregon Location within the United States
- Location: Linn / Marion counties, Oregon, United States
- Coordinates: 44°41.6′N 122°12.2′W
- Lake type: Reservoir
- Primary inflows: North Santiam and Breitenbush Rivers
- Primary outflows: North Santiam River
- Basin countries: United States
- Max. length: 9 m (30 ft)
- Max. width: 1 m (3 ft 3 in)
- Surface area: 3,500 acres (1,400 ha)
- Average depth: 121 ft (37 m)
- Max. depth: 440 ft (130 m)
- Water volume: 455,000 acre⋅ft (0.561 km^{3}) full, 347 million m³ in summer.
- Shore length^{1}: 32 mi (51.4 km)
- Surface elevation: 1,565 ft (477 m)
- Islands: Piety Knob
- Settlements: Detroit, Oregon
- ^{1} Shore length is not a well-defined measure.

Detroit Lake is a reservoir impounded by the Detroit Dam on the North Santiam River 46 miles (74 km) southeast of Salem, Oregon, United States. The lake is adjacent to Oregon Route 22 near the city of Detroit. This mesotrophic lake stores water for use by the city of Salem and other nearby communities.

== History ==
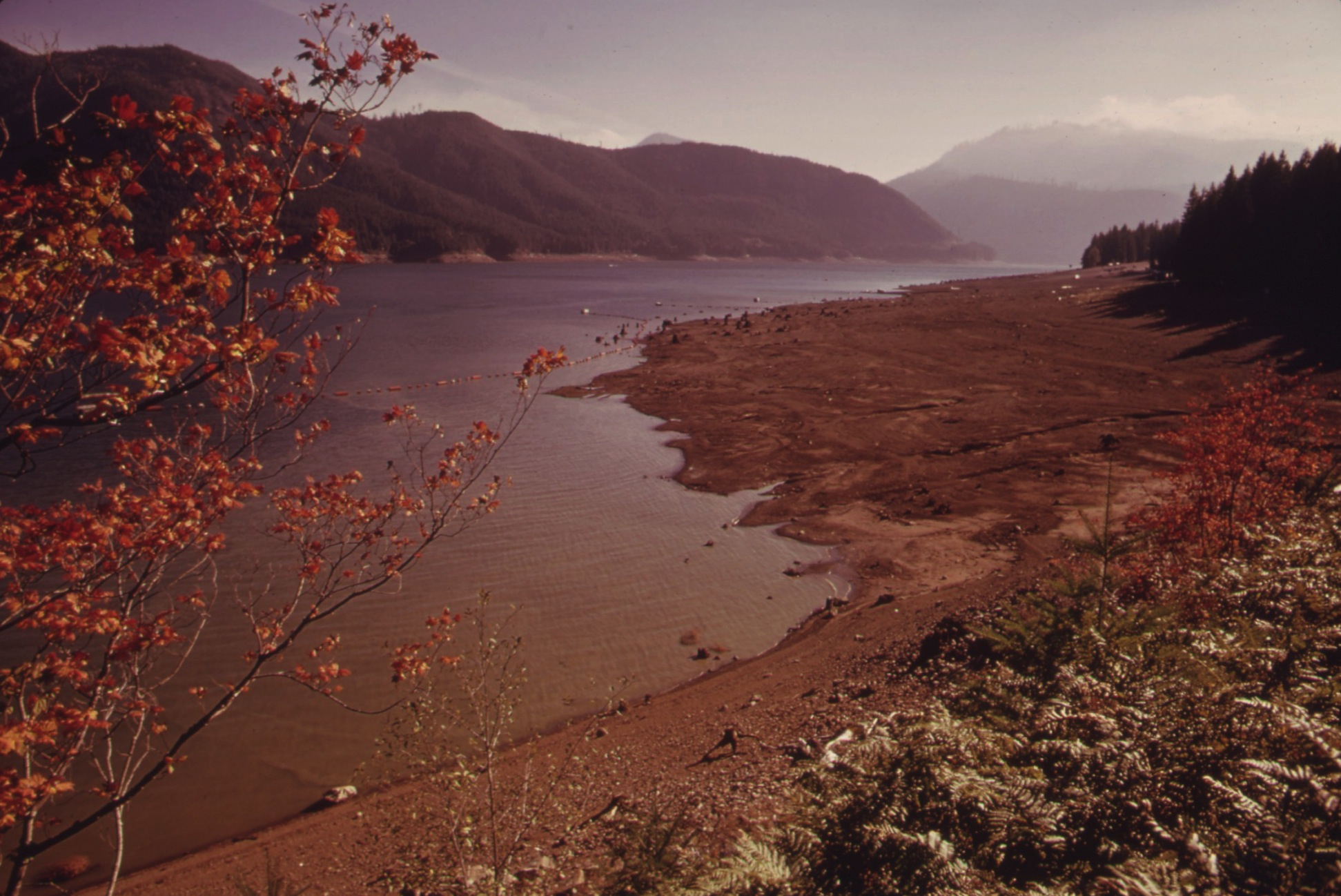
Detroit Lake with low water levels in September 1973

Detroit Lake is situated over a historical road bed of the former Oregon Pacific Railroad. This route was built by Colonel T. Egenton Hogg as a proposed transcontinental railroad. Due to a lack of funding, the line terminated in Idanha, southeast of the lake. Idanha had rail service until the 1950s, when the track was removed for installation of the Detroit and Big Cliff reservoirs. Detroit Lake was created in 1953 after the completion of the dam. Part of the Willamette Valley Projects, the lake was intended primarily for flood control and power generation but has become one of the major recreation resources in western Oregon.

== Details ==
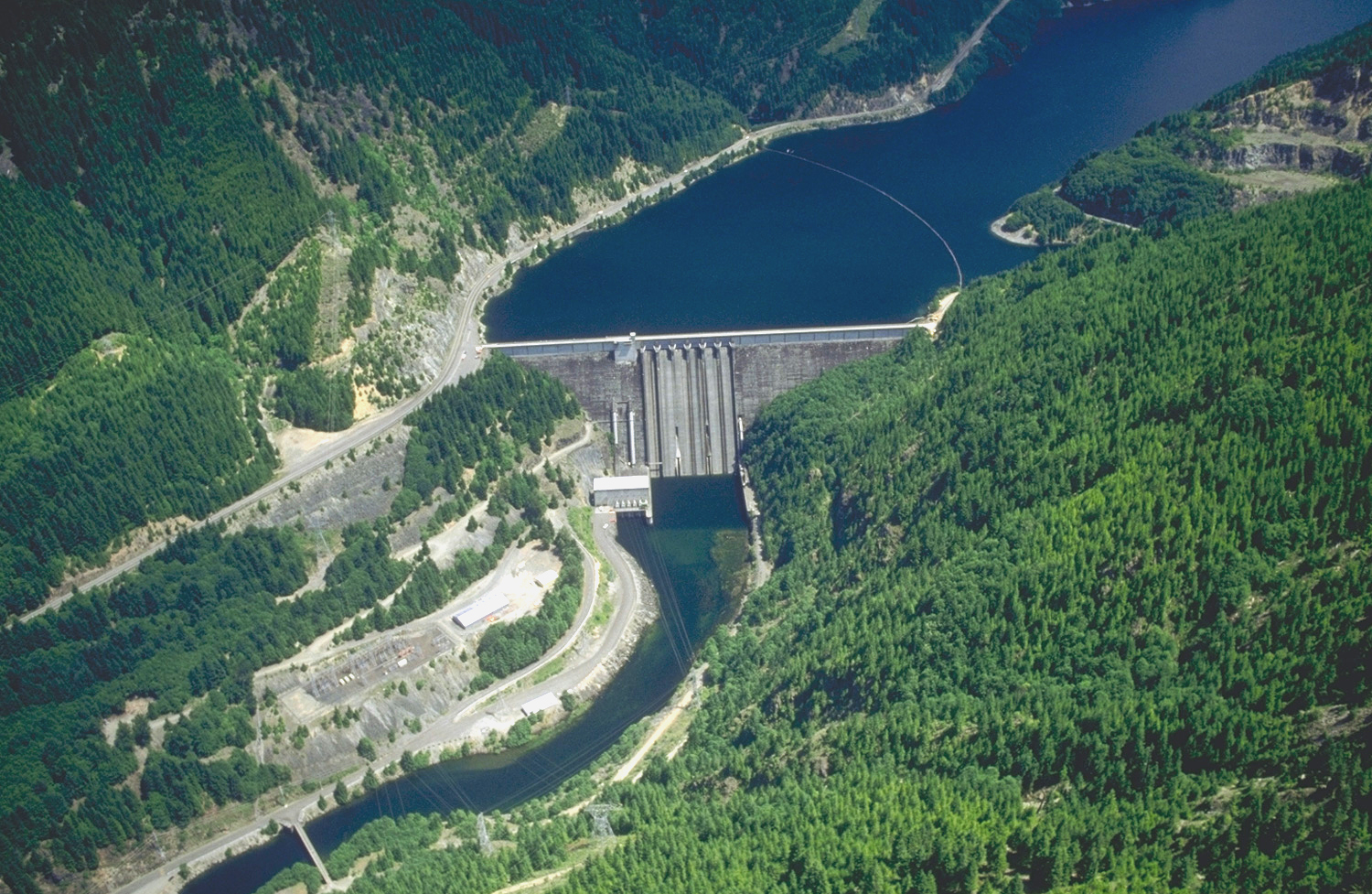
Detroit Dam, impounding Detroit Lake

The reservoir has a capacity of 455,000 acre-feet (561,000,000 m^{3}) of water when full and 281,600 acre-feet (347,300,000 m^{3}) in the summer when drawn down. Located in the North Santiam Canyon, the 9-mile-long (14 km) lake has shoreline of 32 miles (51 km) when full. One swimming opportunity is at the Mongold Day-Use Area (an Oregon State Park). Detroit Lake is stocked by the Oregon Department of Fish and Wildlife with 125,000 catchable rainbow trout along with fingerling rainbow, kokanee, and chinook salmon. A self-sustaining population of brown bullhead catfish resides in the lake.

Detroit Lake offers year-round fishing in still water and not in or near the rivers and streams. It is one of 32 lakes federally designated for recreation, managed by the United States Forest Service. The lake serves many purposes including flood control, water conservation, and recreation.

There are many camping and recreation opportunities at Detroit Lake. In 2009, a new winter boat ramp was constructed, making it possible to launch a boat safely during the winter months when other ramps are on dry ground.

== Water levels ==
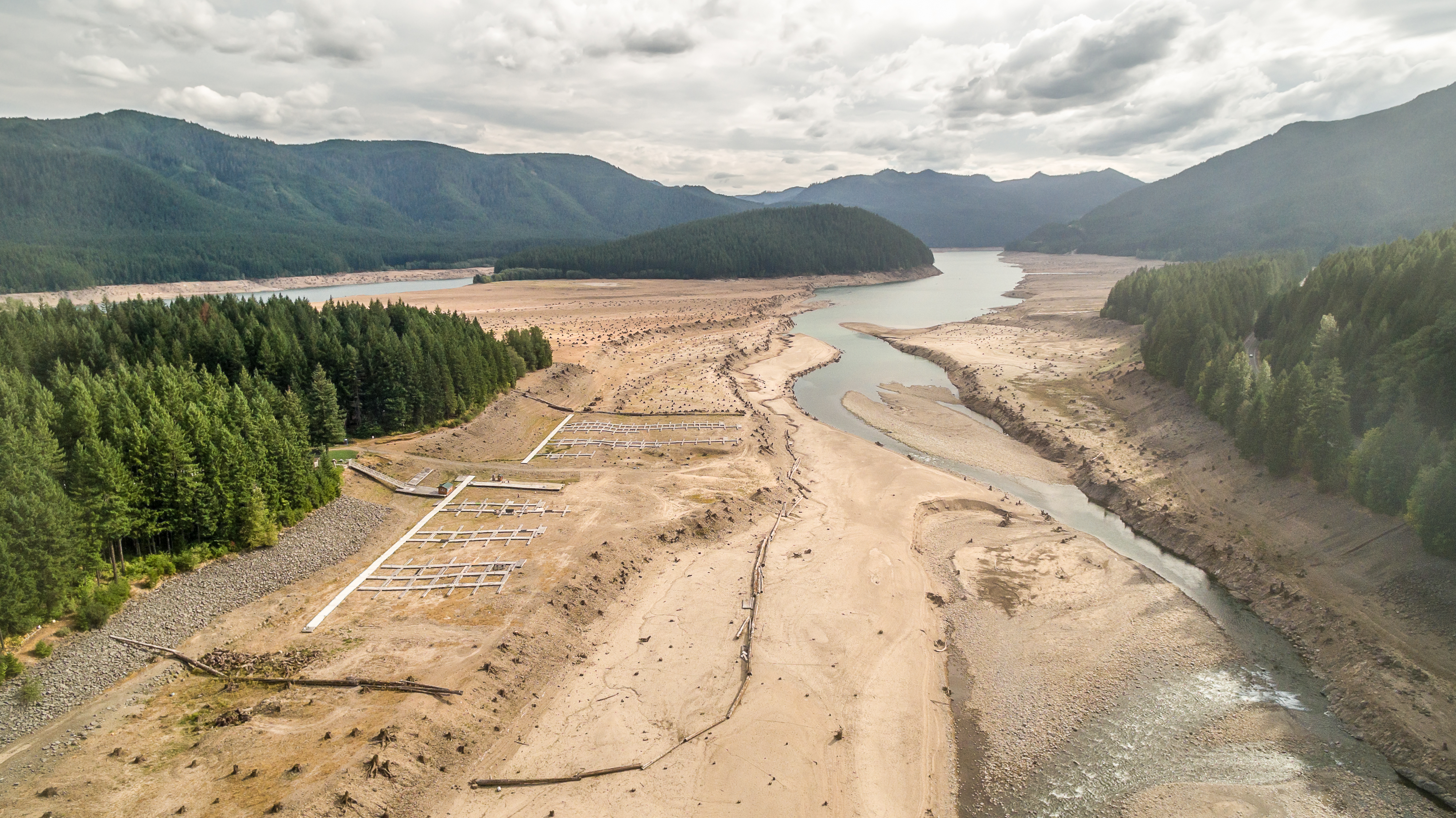
Detroit Lake in August 2015

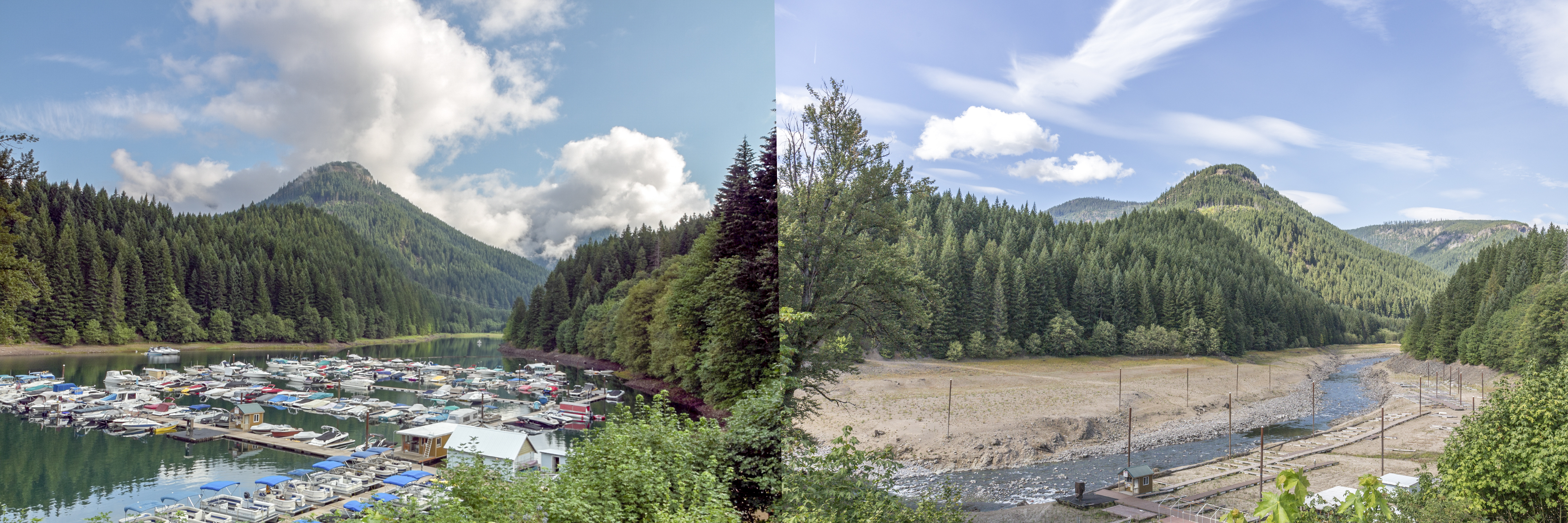
Detroit Lake Marina, before and after

The water level fluctuates with snow pack, precipitation, and the water consumption of Salem and surrounding areas. At low pool, it has a surface elevation of 1,450 feet (440 m); at the full pool season—typically May 1 to September 1—it can raise up 119 feet (36 m) to a water elevation of 1,569 feet (478 m).

In 2015 and 2016, low water levels in the reservoir impacted recreation, marina operations, and the economy in the Santiam Canyon.

== See also ==
- List of lakes in Oregon
