= Santiam Fire =

2020 Oregon wildfire

- Part of the 2020 Oregon wildfires
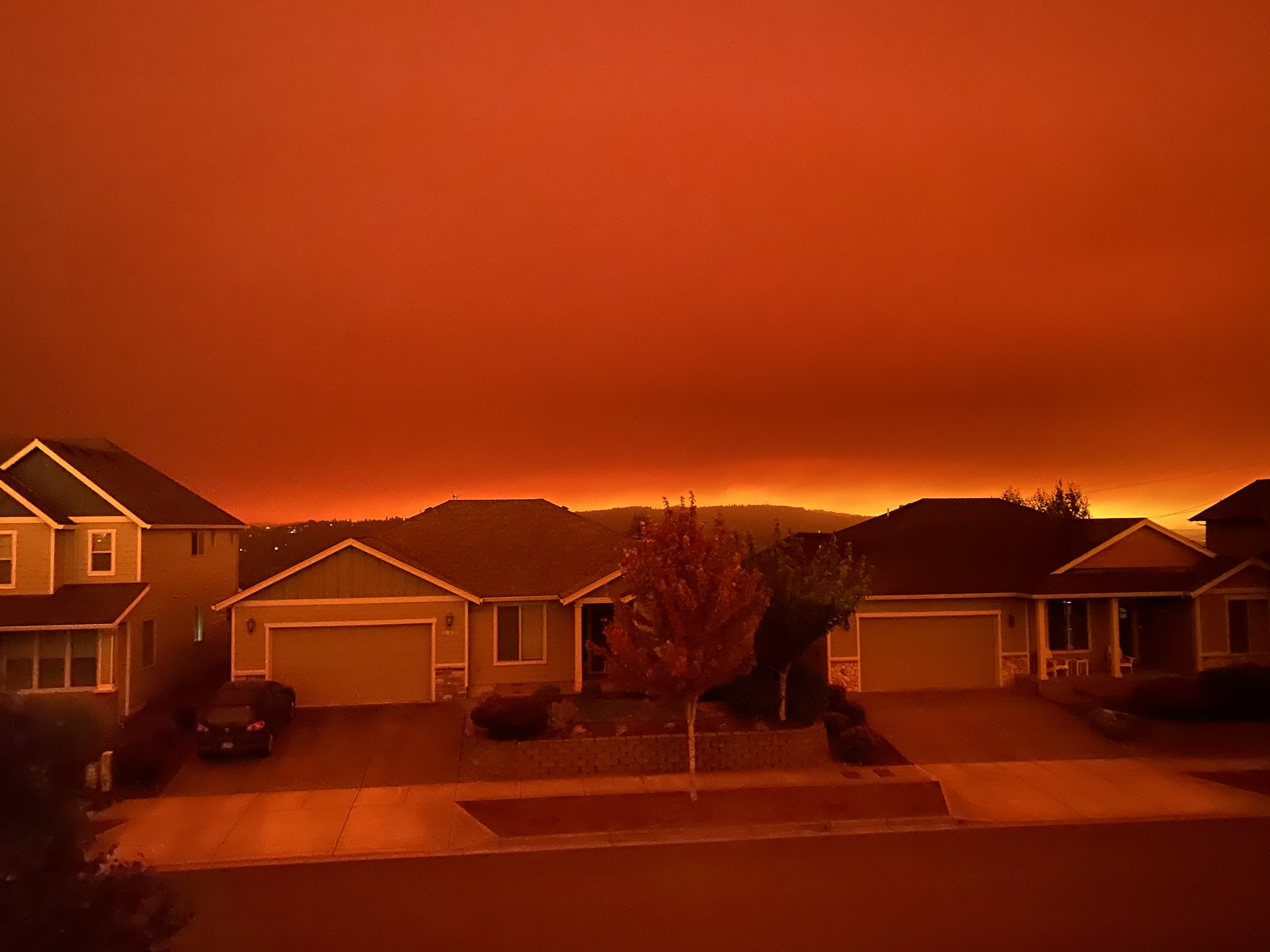
- View of the Santiam Fire from Salem on September 8, 2020, with a sky reddened by smoke
- Date: August 16, 2020 – December 10, 2020
- Location: Northwest Oregon, United States: Marion County; Jefferson County; Linn County; Clackamas County
- Coordinates: 44.821°N 122.188°W

Statistics
- Total fires: 3
- Total area: 402,274 acres (162,795 ha)

Impacts
- Deaths: 5
- Injuries: Unknown
- Missing people: 0
- Structures destroyed: 1,568+
- Cost: >$25.2 million (2020 USD)

Ignition
- Cause: Lightning, downed power line (September spot fires)

Map
- Location of the Santiam Fire in Oregon

The Santiam Fire was a very large wildfire that burned in Marion, Jefferson, Linn, and Clackamas counties, in northwest Oregon, United States. Having ignited in August 2020, the 402,274-acre (162,795 ha) fire ravaged multiple communities in northwestern Oregon, before it was fully contained on December 10, 2020. The fire started as three separate fires. The Beachie Creek, Lionshead, and P-515 fires were ignited by lightning on August 16, 2020. The first three fires gradually grew in size, before explosively spreading in early September during a heatwave, fanned by powerful east winds. Early on September 8, the Beachie Creek and Lionshead Fires merged, and the combined fire was labeled the Santiam Fire, before being returned to their original names a couple of days later. The P-515 Fire merged into the Lionshead Fire a few days later. The Santiam Fire destroyed over 1,500 structures, including nearly the entire cities of Detroit and Gates, with Idanha, Mill City, and Lyons suffering varying amounts of damage, becoming one of the most destructive wildfires in the recorded history of Oregon. The fire killed five people. On September 10–12, 2020, there were fears that the Santiam Fire would merge with the Riverside Fire to the north.

== Timeline ==
On the morning of August 16, thunderstorms moved across Oregon, starting multiple fires, including the Beachie Creek Fire, the Lionshead Fire, and the P-515 Fire. The Lionshead and P-515 Fires were ignited in the Warm Springs Indian Reservation, near Mount Jefferson, while the Beachie Creek Fire was ignited near Opal Creek, to the west of the other two fires. Initially, the three fires were unremarkable, being relatively small wildfires that smoldered in the rugged terrain of the Opal Creek and Mount Jefferson Wildernesses, within the Willamette National Forest. However, the fires gradually grew in size, since firefighters opted to use only indirect methods and water drops to fight the fires, due to the dangers of directly fighting the fires in the steep, mountainous terrain. State authorities closed off portions of the national forest where the fires were burning, in an attempt to keep the fires boxed in. Fire officials noted the potential for the fires to become active and explosively spread under the right conditions, despite their small size at the time.

On September 7, powerful east winds blew across Oregon and the Pacific Northwest, reaching speeds over 50 miles per hour (80 km/h), causing the fires to explode in size as they raced westward, with the Lionshead Fire burning down portions of Idanha. The winds also blew down power lines around Santiam Canyon, sparking 13 spot fires between Detroit and Mehama, which quickly grew into a large blaze that merged with the Beachie Creek Fire within hours. Due to the rapid spread of the Santiam and Beachie Creek Fires, and the imminent threat they posed to communities to the west, including areas as far west as Salem, mass evacuations were ordered in Marion County. The evacuation orders were suddenly issued near midnight on Tuesday, September 8, sowing plenty of confusion and chaos in the ensuing evacuations. Early on September 8, the Lionshead and Beachie Creek Fires merged, probably at a point north of Detroit. The merger created a 313,110-acre (126,710 ha) complex fire, which was referred to as the Santiam Fire, with the name reflecting the fact that the spot fires ignited around Santiam Canyon had been responsible for most of the Beachie Creek Fire's explosive growth. On September 9, the Santiam Fire quickly moved into and destroyed the city of Detroit as it continued its westward spread. Soon afterward, the Santiam Fire destroyed the city of Gates, and burned into Mill City and parts of Lyons during its westward spread, also threatening the cities of Sublimity, Stayton, and Salem. On September 10, incident command renamed the main component fires to Beachie Creek Fire and Lionshead Fire. On the same day, officials feared that the Santiam Fire would merge with the 120,000-acre (49,000 ha) Riverside Fire to the north, which would create an even bigger fire that would pose a much greater threat to the communities near Salem and Portland, while complicating efforts to contain the fires. However, this fear subsided somewhat on the next day, as firefighters made progress on containing both the Santiam and Riverside Fires, with improved weather conditions. On September 11, the P-515 Fire merged into the eastern portion of the Lionshead Fire, increasing the size of the Santiam Fire to 322,573 acres (130,541 ha). During the following week, the onshore flow returned, causing the Lionshead Fire to begin spreading eastward. On September 23, the Santiam Fire exceeded 400,000 acres (160,000 ha) in size.

On December 10, 2020, the entire complex fire was fully contained.

== Impact ==
The fires forced large-scale evacuations across Marion County. Many buildings were destroyed during the fires' westward spread, mostly in September, with the Santiam Fire destroying most of the cities of Detroit, and Gates, with Idanha, Mill City, and Lyons suffering anywhere from moderate to extensive amounts of damage. The Santiam Fire killed 5 people.

== See also ==
- 2020 Oregon wildfires
- 2020 Western United States wildfire season
