= Randy Marshall =

American football player (born 1946)

- Marshall in 1969

No. 89
- Position: Defensive end

Personal information
- Born: December 14, 1946 (age 79); Oregon City, Oregon, U.S.
- Listed height: 6 ft 5 in (1.96 m)
- Listed weight: 237 lb (108 kg)

Career information
- High school: Santiam (Mill City, Oregon)
- College: Linfield
- NFL draft: 1970: 6th round, 152nd overall pick

Career history
- Atlanta Falcons (1970–1971)

Career NFL statistics
- Games: 15
- Stats at Pro Football Reference

Randall Donn Marshall (born December 14, 1946) is an American former professional football player who was a defensive end in the National Football League (NFL). He played college football for the Linfield Wildcats.

Marshall was born in Oregon City, Oregon, in 1946 and attended Santiam High School in Mill City, Oregon. He played college football and basketball at Linfield College in McMinnville, Oregon. He played for the football team from 1966 to 1969.

Marshall was selected by the Atlanta Falcons in the sixth round (152nd overall pick) of the 1970 NFL draft. He was called up from the taxi squad in October 1970 after Claude Humphrey was injured. In his first game for the Falcons, he received the team's "player of the Week" honor. Several weeks later, Marshall and teammate Bob Berry were arrested following a police raid on an alleged "pot party" at Marshall's apartment. In January 1977, a Cobb County Grand Jury found no cause for charges against either Marshall of Berry.

Marshall appeared in 15 games for the Falcons, two of them as a starter, during the 1970 and 1971 seasons. He was inducted into the Linfield Athletics Hall of Fame in 2006.
