= Mehama, Oregon =

Unincorporated community in the state of Oregon, United States

- Census-designated place
- Location in Marion County and the state of Oregon
- Coordinates: 44°47′30″N 122°37′26″W
- Country: United States
- State: Oregon
- County: Marion

Area
  - Total: 0.48 sq mi (1.24 km^{2})
  - Land: 0.46 sq mi (1.19 km^{2})
  - Water: 0.019 sq mi (0.05 km^{2})
- Elevation: 620 ft (190 m)

Population (2020)
  - Total: 317
  - Density: 692/sq mi (267.1/km^{2})
- Time zone: UTC-8 (Pacific (PST))
  - Summer (DST): UTC-7 (PDT)
- ZIP Codes: 97384 (Mehama); 97383 (Stayton)
- Area code: 503
- FIPS code: 41-47300
- GNIS feature ID: 2408813

Mehama is an unincorporated community and census-designated place (CDP) in Marion County, Oregon, United States, located on Oregon Route 22 and the North Santiam River. The population was 317 at the 2020 census. It is part of the Salem Metropolitan Statistical Area.

Mehama is the eastern terminus of Oregon Route 226, and is just one mile (1.6 km) north of Lyons, across the North Santiam.

== History ==
Mehama was named for the wife of pioneer James X. Smith. Smith laid out the townsite and operated a ferry on the North Santiam. A post office, misnamed Mehamah, was established in 1877, but the name was changed to Mehama by 1881.

== Geography ==
Mehama lies on the north side of the North Santiam River and the Linn County line. Oregon Route 22 passes through the community, leading northwest 24 miles (39 km) to Salem, the state capital and Marion county seat, and east up the North Santiam River valley 28 miles (45 km) to Detroit. OR 226 has its eastern terminus at OR 22 on the eastern edge of Mehama. Running south across the North Santiam River into Lyons, it leads southwest 33 miles (53 km) to Albany.

According to the U.S. Census Bureau, the Mehama CDP has a total area of 0.48 square miles (1.24 km^{2}), of which 0.02 square miles (0.05 km^{2}), or 4.18%, are water in the North Santiam River.

== Demographics ==
Historical population
| Census | Pop. | Note | %± |
|---|---|---|---|
| 2000 | 283 | | — |
| 2010 | 292 | | 3.2% |
| 2020 | 317 | | 8.6% |
U.S. Decennial Census

As of the census of 2000, there were 283 people, 110 households, and 77 families residing in the CDP. The population density was 596.8 inhabitants per square mile (230.4/km^{2}). There were 123 housing units at an average density of 259.4 per square mile (100.2/km^{2}). The racial makeup of the CDP was 89.05% White, 0.35% African American, 2.47% Native American, 1.06% Asian, 0.35% from other races, and 6.71% from two or more races. Hispanic or Latino of any race were 1.06% of the population.

There were 110 households, out of which 31.8% had children under the age of 18 living with them, 58.2% were married couples living together, 9.1% had a female householder with no husband present, and 29.1% were non-families. 23.6% of all households were made up of individuals, and 9.1% had someone living alone who was 65 years of age or older. The average household size was 2.57 and the average family size was 3.01.

In the CDP, the population was spread out, with 22.6% under the age of 18, 7.8% from 18 to 24, 28.3% from 25 to 44, 26.1% from 45 to 64, and 15.2% who were 65 years of age or older. The median age was 40 years. For every 100 females, there were 102.1 males. For every 100 females age 18 and over, there were 112.6 males.

The median income for a household in the CDP was $38,854, and the median income for a family was $54,286. Males had a median income of $35,192 versus $14,712 for females. The per capita income for the CDP was $17,617. None of the families and 11.2% of the population were living below the poverty line.
