= Oregon Pacific Railroad =

Oregon Pacific Railroad or Oregon Pacific Railway may refer to:

- Oregon Pacific Railroad (1880–1894), railroad from Yaquina Bay (Newport) to Santiam Pass
- Oregon Pacific Railroad (1997), shortline railroad on the east side of Portland
