= Todd Snyder (American football) =

American football player (born 1948)

No. 80
- Position: Wide receiver

Personal information
- Born: October 22, 1948 (age 78); Athens, Ohio, U.S.
- Listed height: 6 ft 1 in (1.85 m)
- Listed weight: 187 lb (85 kg)

Career information
- High school: Athens
- College: Ohio
- NFL draft: 1970: 3rd round, 65th overall pick

Career history
- Atlanta Falcons (1970–1972)

Career NFL statistics
- Receptions: 24
- Receiving yards: 330
- Receiving TDs: 2
- Stats at Pro Football Reference

James Todd Snyder (born October 22, 1948) is an American former professional football player who was a wide receiver for the Atlanta Falcons of the National Football League (NFL). He played college football for the Ohio Bobcats.
