= Detroit Dam =

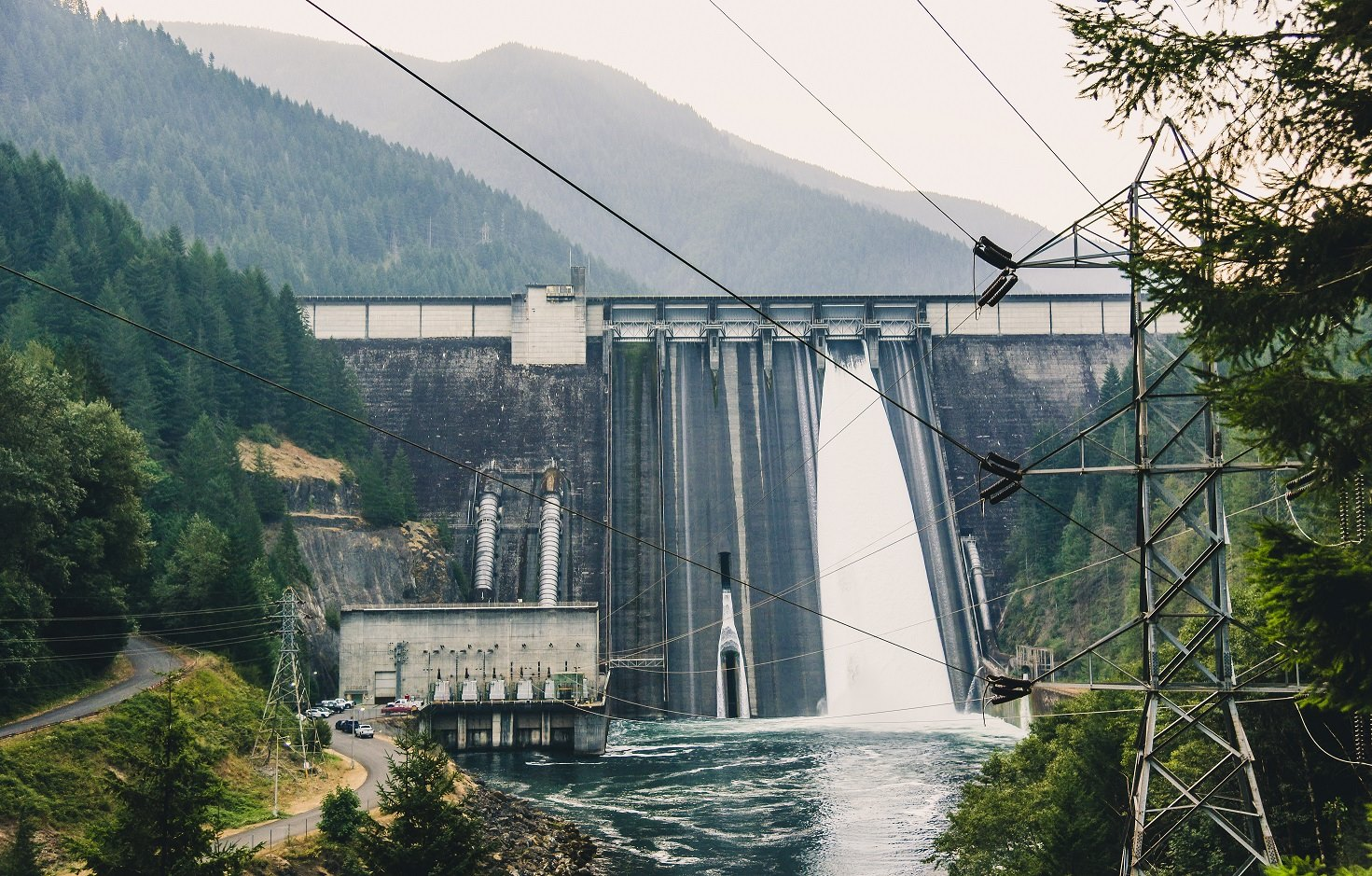
- Detroit Dam on the North Santiam River

- Location within Oregon
- Country: United States
- Location: Detroit, Linn County/Marion County, Oregon
- Coordinates: 44.7209556°N 122.2497972°W
- Purpose: Flood control, power, irrigation
- Status: Operational
- Construction began: 1949
- Opening date: 1953; 73 years ago
- Construction cost: $13,615,000 (1953 est.) equiv. to $164 million today
- Owner: U.S. Army Corps of Engineers

Dam and spillways
- Type of dam: Concrete gravity
- Impounds: North Santiam River
- Height: 463 ft (141 m)
- Length: 1,523.5 ft (464.4 m)
- Elevation at crest: 1,580 ft (480 m)

Reservoir
- Creates: Detroit Lake
- Total capacity: 455,000 acre⋅ft (561,000,000 m^{3})
- Active capacity: 321,000 acre-feet (396,000,000 m^{3})
- Catchment area: 437 mi^{2} (1,130 km^{2})
- Surface area: 3,500 acres (14 km^{2})
- Maximum length: 9 mi (14 km)
- Normal elevation: 1,569 ft (478 m) (full)

Power Station
- Commission date: 1953
- Type: Conventional
- Turbines: 2 x 100 MW Francis-type
- Installed capacity: 100 MW

Detroit Dam is a gravity dam on the North Santiam River between Linn County and Marion County, Oregon. It is located in the Cascades, about 5 mi (8.0 km) west of the city of Detroit. It was constructed between 1949 and 1953 by the United States Army Corps of Engineers. The dam created 400-foot (120 m) deep Detroit Lake, more than 9 miles (14 km) long with 32 miles (51 km) of shoreline.

It is one of the dams authorized by the Flood Control Act of 1938. Construction was delayed largely due to World War II. The dam, dedicated on June 10, 1953, was authorized for the purposes of flood control, power generation, navigation, and irrigation. Other uses are fishery, water quality, and recreation. It was built in concert with the Big Cliff Dam downstream.

In 2021, the U.S. Army Corps of Engineers determined that this dam was at risk of failing in a large earthquake in the Cascadia subduction zone, which would result in a "potentially catastrophic flood", which could potentially affect Oregon's state capital, Salem, located downstream. For this reason, the level of the reservoir was lowered by five feet, to reduce the stress on the concrete structure.

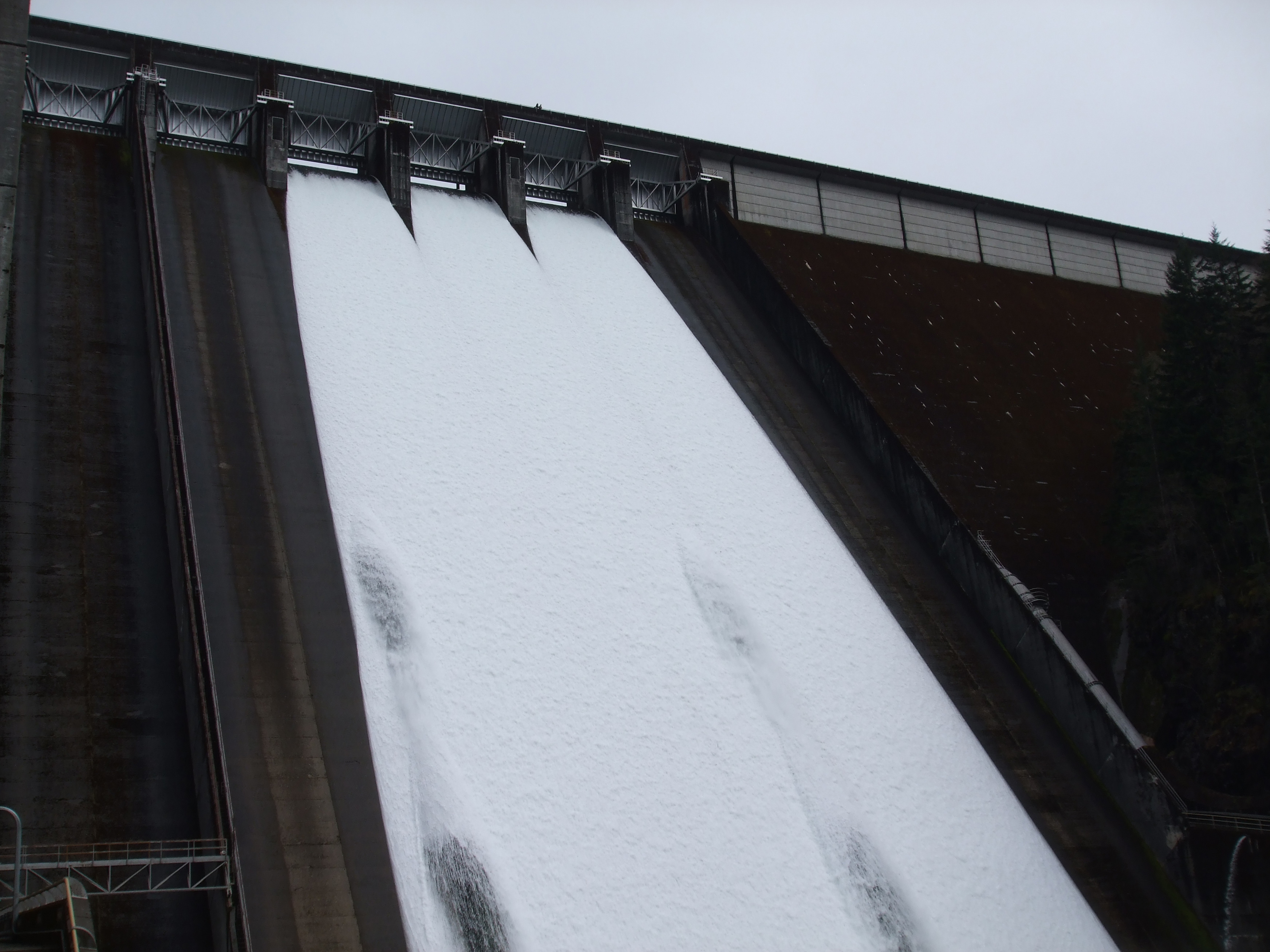
Free-overflow spill test, 2013

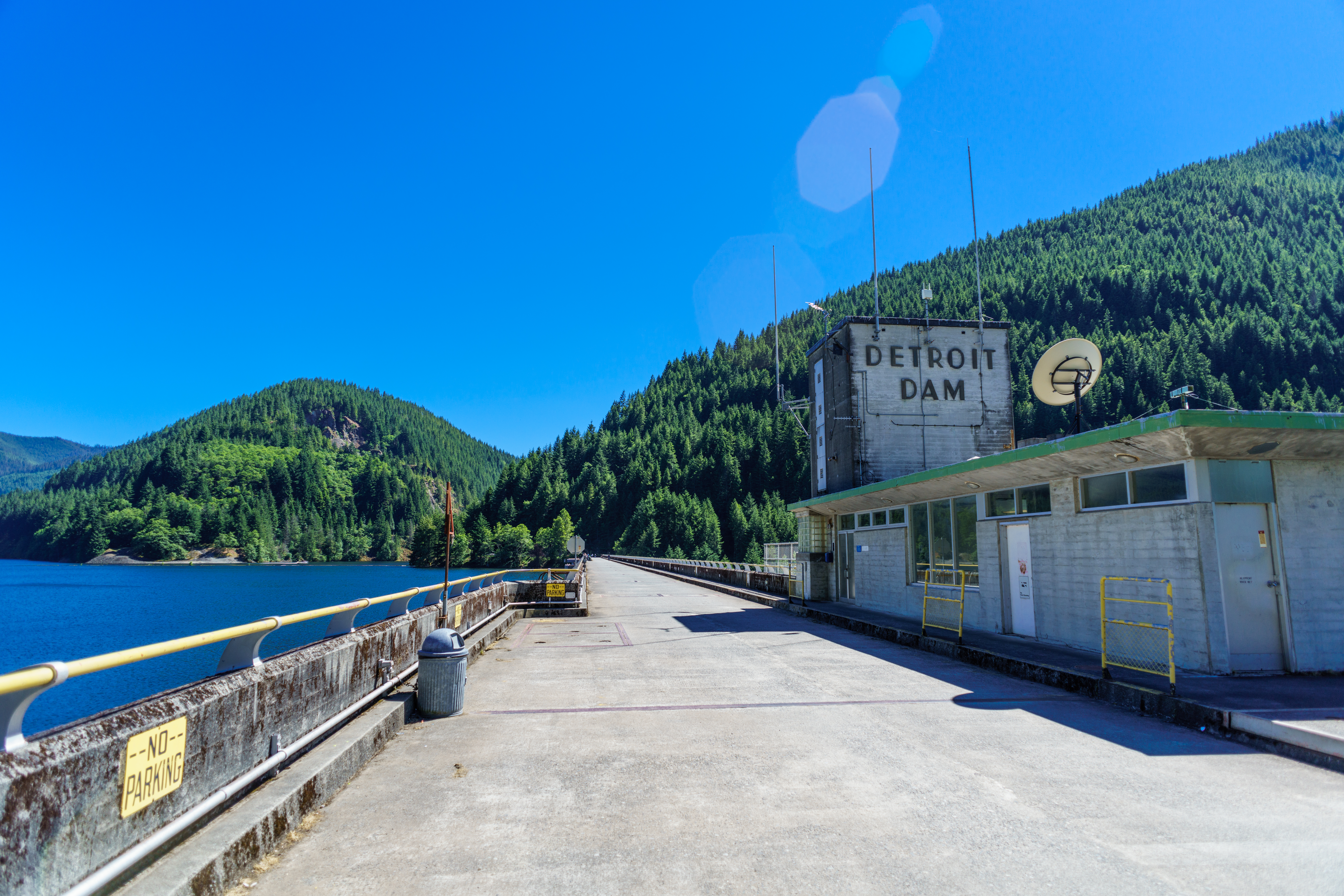
Top of Dam

== Capacity ==
- Drainage area: 437 mi^{2} (1,132 km^{2})
- Maximum inflow: 63,200 ft^{3}/s (1,790 m³/s) 1909
- Lake Elevation
  - Maximum pool: 1,574 ft (480 m)
  - Full pool: 1,569 ft (478 m)
  - Minimum flood control pool: 1,450 ft (442 m)
- Usable storage (1,425.0 to 1,563.5 ft) = 321,000 acre-feet (396,000,000 m^{3})
- Powerhouse
  - Number of units: 2
  - Nameplate capacity: 100 MW
  - Overload capacity: 115 MW
  - Hydraulic capacity: 5,340 ft^{3}/s (151 m³/s)
