= Santiam Junction, Oregon =

Unincorporated community in the state of Oregon, United States

Santiam Junction
- Unincorporated area locale
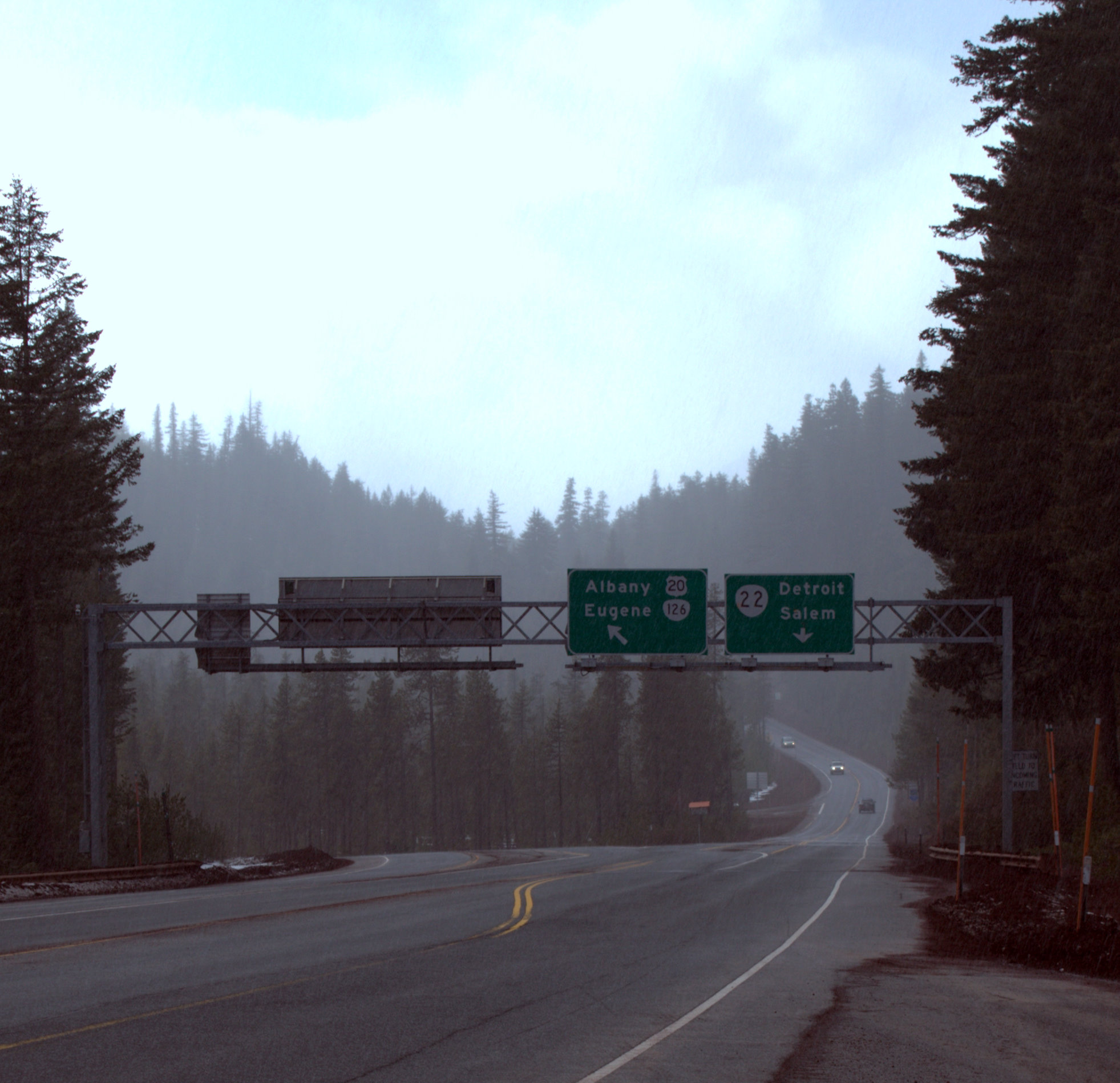
- Highways at Santiam Junction

- Location within the state of Oregon Santiam Junction (the United States)
- Coordinates: 44°26′12″N 121°56′22″W
- Country: United States
- State: Oregon
- County: Linn
- Elevation: 3,750 ft (1,140 m)
- Time zone: UTC-8 (Pacific (PST))
  - Summer (DST): UTC-7 (PDT)

Santiam Junction is a highway junction and unincorporated community in Linn County, Oregon, United States, at the intersection of U.S. Route 20/Oregon Route 126 and Oregon Route 22.

According to the Oregon Department of Transportation, the elevation is 3,750 feet (1,143 m).

An automated weather station is located here, as well as highway maintenance facilities. The Santiam Junction State Airport is an emergency/recreational/aerial firefighting landing strip that is closed from the first snowfall until spring. The airport grounds permit fly-in camping.

The Santiam Junction vicinity is listed by the National Register of Historic Places as the site of the Oregon Pacific Railroad Linear Historic District, which consists of roughly 20 miles (32 km) of the old railroad grade between Idanha and the line's Cascade Range summit.

Geologically, much of the area is a lava bed created during a period of volcanic activity around 1000 B.C.

== Climate ==
Santiam Junction experiences a dry-summer humid continental climate (Köppen Dsb) with warm, dry summers and cold, wet winters with heavy snow and rain.

Climate data for Santiam Junction, Oregon, 1991–2020 normals, 1949-2020 extremes: 3750ft (1143m)
Month	Jan	Feb	Mar	Apr	May	Jun	Jul	Aug	Sep	Oct	Nov	Dec	Year
Record high °F (°C)	72 (22)	68 (20)	71 (22)	88 (31)	96 (36)	96 (36)	98 (37)	99 (37)	96 (36)	86 (30)	76 (24)	60 (16)	99 (37)
Mean maximum °F (°C)	53.4 (11.9)	55.8 (13.2)	61.6 (16.4)	69.9 (21.1)	77.4 (25.2)	84.1 (28.9)	90.8 (32.7)	91.0 (32.8)	87.2 (30.7)	76.0 (24.4)	61.7 (16.5)	49.0 (9.4)	92.9 (33.8)
Mean daily maximum °F (°C)	37.6 (3.1)	40.7 (4.8)	43.6 (6.4)	48.5 (9.2)	57.7 (14.3)	64.6 (18.1)	76.0 (24.4)	76.5 (24.7)	68.8 (20.4)	56.1 (13.4)	42.4 (5.8)	36.3 (2.4)	54.1 (12.3)
Daily mean °F (°C)	30.6 (−0.8)	32.1 (0.1)	34.7 (1.5)	38.8 (3.8)	46.2 (7.9)	51.5 (10.8)	59.2 (15.1)	59.1 (15.1)	53.8 (12.1)	44.3 (6.8)	35.0 (1.7)	29.8 (−1.2)	42.9 (6.1)
Mean daily minimum °F (°C)	23.6 (−4.7)	23.6 (−4.7)	25.8 (−3.4)	29.1 (−1.6)	34.7 (1.5)	38.3 (3.5)	42.4 (5.8)	41.7 (5.4)	38.7 (3.7)	32.5 (0.3)	27.6 (−2.4)	23.3 (−4.8)	31.8 (−0.1)
Mean minimum °F (°C)	7.2 (−13.8)	7.8 (−13.4)	13.0 (−10.6)	18.1 (−7.7)	25.0 (−3.9)	29.1 (−1.6)	32.9 (0.5)	31.4 (−0.3)	27.9 (−2.3)	22.0 (−5.6)	13.6 (−10.2)	6.6 (−14.1)	−1.6 (−18.7)
Record low °F (°C)	−11 (−24)	−18 (−28)	−3 (−19)	4 (−16)	18 (−8)	22 (−6)	27 (−3)	28 (−2)	21 (−6)	14 (−10)	−4 (−20)	−19 (−28)	−19 (−28)
Average precipitation inches (mm)	10.84 (275)	7.79 (198)	7.76 (197)	6.03 (153)	4.01 (102)	2.81 (71)	0.66 (17)	0.77 (20)	2.28 (58)	5.88 (149)	9.98 (253)	11.58 (294)	70.39 (1,787)
Average snowfall inches (cm)	46.1 (117)	35.1 (89)	32.6 (83)	14.3 (36)	2.2 (5.6)	0.2 (0.51)	0.0 (0.0)	trace	0.1 (0.25)	4.2 (11)	25.5 (65)	49.2 (125)	209.5 (532.36)
Average precipitation days	17.6	16.1	16.9	15.0	11.4	6.6	2.0	2.5	5.0	12.2	17.4	18.9	141.6
Source 1: NOAA
Source 2: XMACIS (snowfall, temp records & monthly max/mins)

Climate data for Santiam Junction
Month	Jan	Feb	Mar	Apr	May	Jun	Jul	Aug	Sep	Oct	Nov	Dec	Year
Record high °F (°C)	61 (16)	67 (19)	71 (22)	88 (31)	96 (36)	95 (35)	99 (37)	99 (37)	96 (36)	86 (30)	76 (24)	60 (16)	99 (37)
Mean daily maximum °F (°C)	37.8 (3.2)	40.7 (4.8)	44.3 (6.8)	49.6 (9.8)	59.2 (15.1)	65.2 (18.4)	76.4 (24.7)	77.2 (25.1)	71.4 (21.9)	58.8 (14.9)	44.4 (6.9)	37.4 (3.0)	55.2 (12.9)
Mean daily minimum °F (°C)	22.5 (−5.3)	23.1 (−4.9)	25.4 (−3.7)	29.2 (−1.6)	33.9 (1.1)	38.2 (3.4)	42.7 (5.9)	41.3 (5.2)	37.7 (3.2)	32.4 (0.2)	27.8 (−2.3)	22.1 (−5.5)	31.4 (−0.3)
Record low °F (°C)	−7 (−22)	−18 (−28)	0 (−18)	4 (−16)	18 (−8)	22 (−6)	28 (−2)	28 (−2)	21 (−6)	14 (−10)	2 (−17)	−19 (−28)	−19 (−28)
Average precipitation inches (mm)	9.28 (236)	6.66 (169)	7.72 (196)	5.74 (146)	3.74 (95)	2.37 (60)	0.75 (19)	0.73 (19)	1.35 (34)	4.1 (100)	10.63 (270)	9.06 (230)	62.14 (1,578)
Average snowfall inches (cm)	47.5 (121)	39.5 (100)	39.4 (100)	15 (38)	2.8 (7.1)	0.3 (0.76)	0 (0)	0 (0)	0.1 (0.25)	4.8 (12)	33.8 (86)	57.6 (146)	240.8 (612)
Average precipitation days	17	14	19	16	12	8	3	3	5	10	20	16	143

== See also ==
- Hogg Rock
- Santiam Pass
- Hoodoo (ski area)
