= North Santiam River =

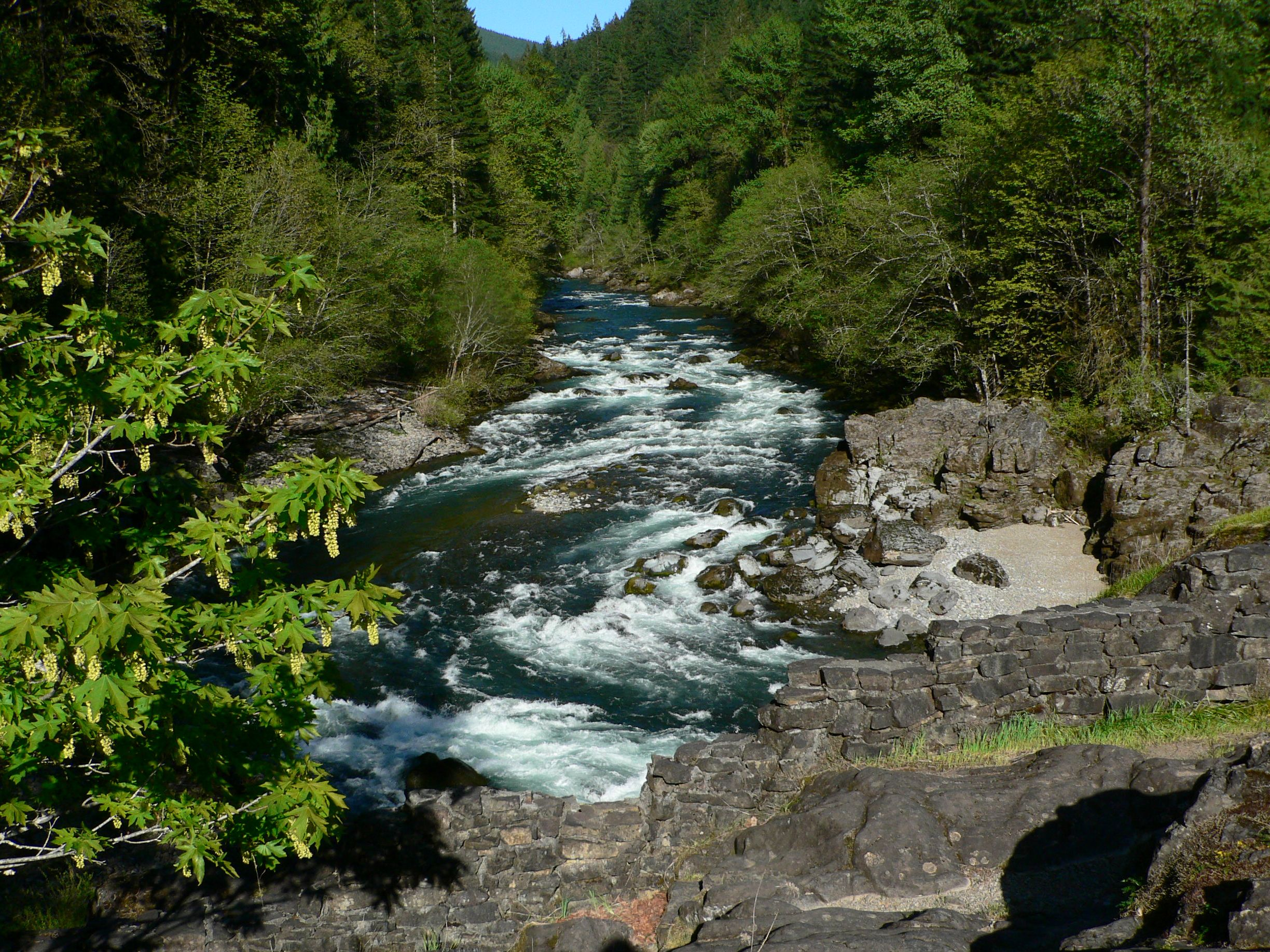
- North Santiam River at Niagara County Park

- Location of the mouth of the North Santiam River in Oregon
- Etymology: Kalapuya tribe that lived near the Santiam River until removal to the Grande Ronde Reservation in 1906

Location
- Country: United States
- State: Oregon
- Counties: Linn and Marion

Physical characteristics
- Source: Santiam Lake
  - location: Cascade Range, Mount Jefferson Wilderness, Linn County
  - coordinates: 44°28′39″N 121°53′04″W
  - elevation: 5,133 ft (1,565 m)
- Mouth: Santiam River
  - location: Willamette Valley, Marion County
  - coordinates: 44°41′12″N 123°00′24″W
  - elevation: 217 ft (66 m)
- Length: 92 mi (148 km)
- Basin size: 766 sq mi (1,980 km^{2})
- Discharge
  - location: Mehama, 38.7 miles (62.3 km) from the mouth
  - average: 3,371 cu ft/s (95.5 m^{3}/s)
  - minimum: 420 cu ft/s (12 m^{3}/s)
  - maximum: 76,600 cu ft/s (2,170 m^{3}/s)

The North Santiam River is a 92-mile (148 km) tributary of the Santiam River in western Oregon in the United States. It drains 766 square miles (1,980 km^{2}) of the Cascade Range on the eastern side of the Willamette Valley east of Salem.

It rises in the high Cascades in eastern Linn County, northwest of Three Fingered Jack in the Willamette National Forest. It flows north through the mountains past Marion Forks, receiving the drainage from the western slope of Mount Jefferson. Near Mount Jefferson it turns sharply west, descending through a canyon past Idanha and Detroit to Niagara County Park where the valley begins to widen and some agriculture use begins. Continuing west, the river flows past Gates, Mill City and Mehama. It emerges through the foothills into the Willamette Valley near Stayton, then flows 15 miles (24 km) southwest through the valley where it joins the South Santiam River to form the Santiam River. The confluence is approximately 10 miles (16 km) east of the confluence of the Santiam and the Willamette River.

It is impounded by Detroit Dam in the mountains west of Detroit to form Detroit Lake for flood control. Detroit Lake State Park is along the northern shore of the lake.

In the 19th century, the canyon of the North Santiam River provided a formidable obstacle to settlers. The construction of a railroad in 1887 opened up the canyon to settlement and logging of the surrounding mountains.

== Fauna ==
Blocked by Big Cliff Dam near Mill City, the lower North Santiam River supports spring chinook salmon and summer steelhead. In the reaches upstream of the dam, the river is managed mainly as a stocked-trout fishery. Near the stream's source at Santiam Lake in the Mount Jefferson Wilderness, native cutthroat trout, rainbow trout, and introduced brook trout are also found.

The headwaters of Marion Creek, a tributary of the North Santiam River, originate at Marion Lake, which is a location of many wildlife species. This headwaters area is a breeding location for amphibians including the rough-skinned newt.

== Watershed ==
Ten cities draw their drinking water from the North Santiam watershed: Detroit, Gates, Idanha, Jefferson, Lyons, Mehama, Mill City, Salem, Stayton, and Turner.

== See also ==
- List of rivers of Oregon
- Willamette Riverkeeper
