= Detroit, Oregon =

- City
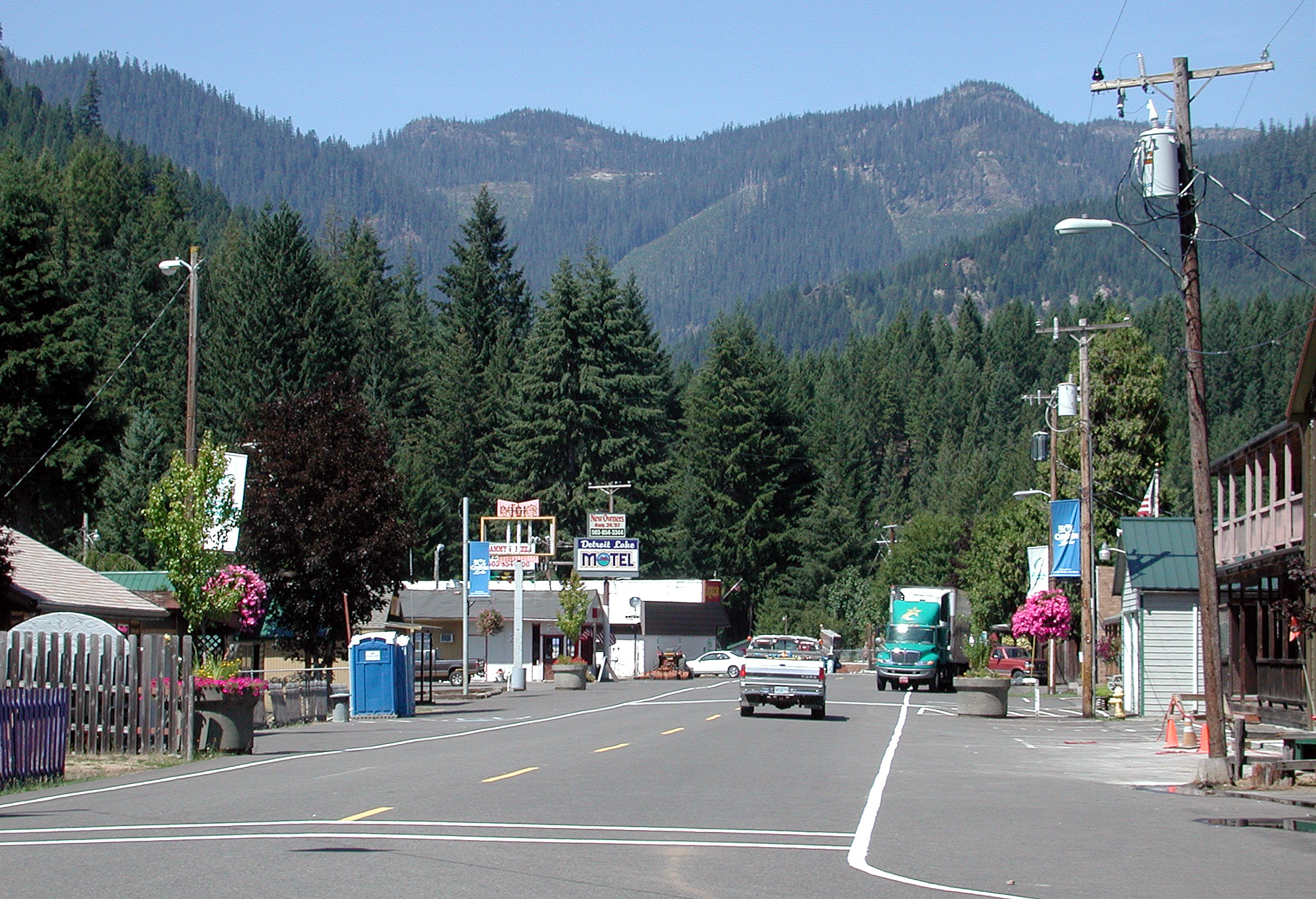
- Looking north along Detroit Avenue in 2009

- Location in Oregon
- Coordinates: 44°44′02″N 122°09′04″W
- Country: United States
- State: Oregon
- County: Marion
- Incorporated: 1952

Government
  - Mayor: Eric Page

Area
  - Total: 0.95 sq mi (2.47 km^{2})
  - Land: 0.59 sq mi (1.52 km^{2})
  - Water: 0.37 sq mi (0.95 km^{2})
- Elevation: 1,604 ft (489 m)

Population (2020)
  - Total: 203
  - Density: 346.3/sq mi (133.71/km^{2})
- Time zone: UTC-8 (Pacific)
  - Summer (DST): UTC-7 (Pacific)
- ZIP Code: 97342
- Area codes: 503 and 971
- FIPS code: 41-19100
- GNIS feature ID: 2410330
- Website: detroitoregon.us

Detroit is a city in Marion County, Oregon, United States. It was named for Detroit, Michigan, in the 1890s because of the large number of people from Michigan in the community. The population was 203 at the 2020 census. It is part of the Salem Metropolitan Statistical Area.

== History ==
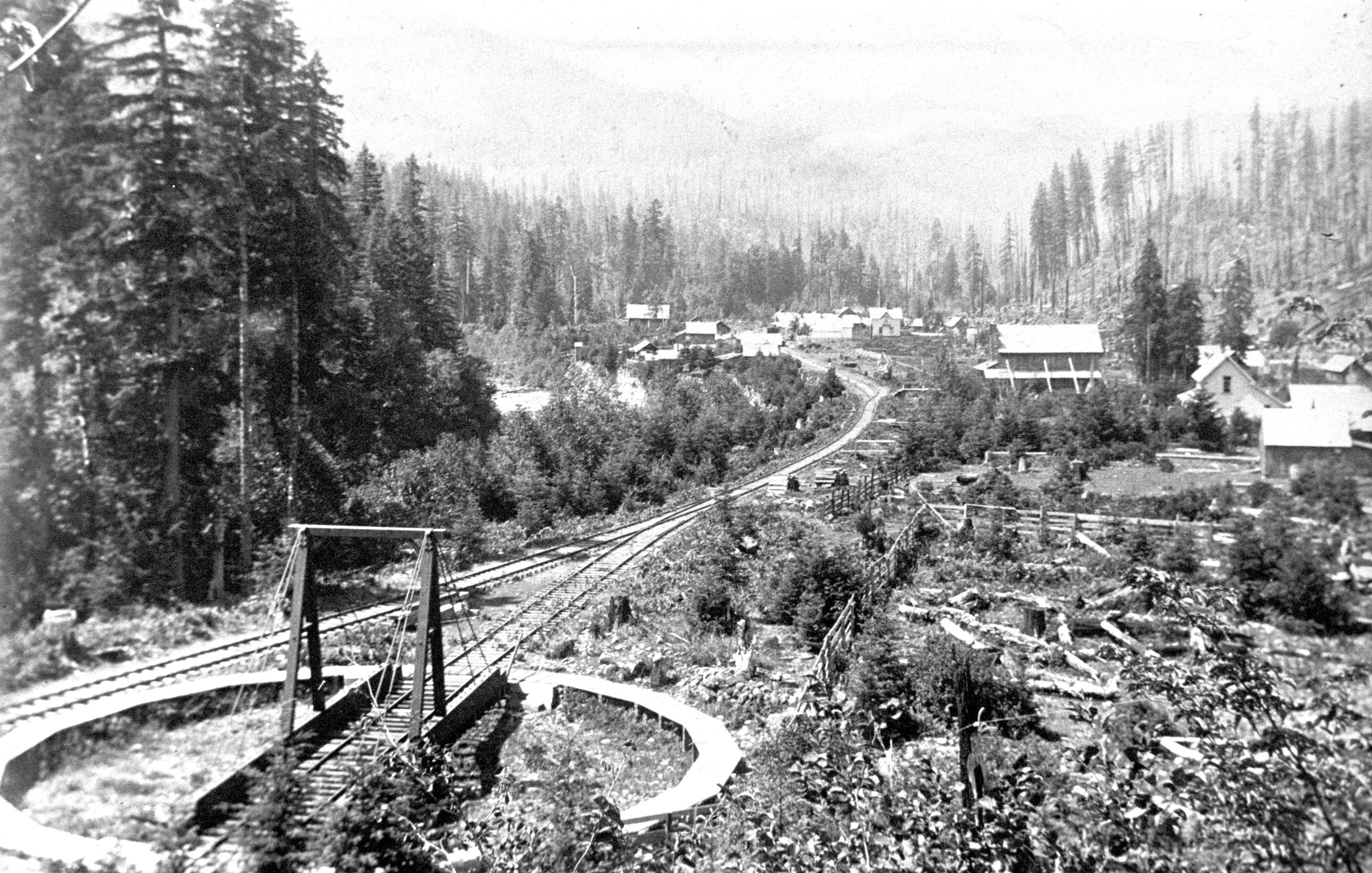
Railroad turntable, just above Detroit, c. 1900

The original townsite of Detroit was inundated in the summer of 1952 when the Corps of Engineers finished Detroit Dam on the Santiam River. The community was relocated about 1/2 mile (0.80 km) northwest of the original site, on Route 22, and was incorporated as a city the same year.

Construction on the concrete Detroit Dam began on April 1, 1949, as part of the U.S. Army Corps of Engineers' Willamette Valley Project. The completed dam was dedicated by former Oregon Governor Douglas McKay and the U. S. Secretary of the Interior on June 10, 1953. In addition to flood control, the dam benefited navigation, irrigation, electric power production, stream purification and recreation.

Located near Detroit Lake and Detroit Lake State Park, Detroit's economy is dependent on tourism. The community suffered from a drought in 2001, when Detroit Lake was little more than the Santiam River through the summer.

In 2010, by a vote of 47–37, citizens in Detroit voted down a ballot measure that would have changed the city's name to Detroit Lake, the name of the neighboring reservoir and one of the most visited summer sites in Oregon. The proposal was put forth by Doug DeGeorge, a builder and motel owner who resides in Arizona and wanted to disassociate the town from Detroit, Michigan, and its close ties to "crime, corruption, failing schools, and a shaky auto industry". DeGeorge was not present on the day of the city council vote, but repercussions from his comments had phone lines flooded with angry calls from Michigan residents. Voters chose to keep the original name of the city, though most residents and tourists still call it Detroit Lake. Gary Brown, a city councilman in Detroit, Michigan, disagreed with the proposal, saying that residents would have made a big mistake because "the Motor City will one day return to its previous glory".

On September 9, 2020, the entire city of Detroit was mostly burned to the ground during the Santiam Fire. Dozens of people were trapped, but managed to escape on a forest road through the active fire. A few months later, during the February 2021 winter and ice storm, the city received 26 in (66 cm) of snow—the most of any place affected by the storm.

== Geography ==
Detroit is in eastern Marion County, within the Cascade Range. It is on the north side of Detroit Lake, a reservoir on the North Santiam River. A tributary, the Breitenbush River, enters the lake on the west side of the city. Oregon Route 22 passes through the center of town, leading east then south 31 miles (50 km) to U.S. Route 20 at Santiam Junction, and west 52 miles (84 km) to Salem, the state capital and Marion county seat. The 10,497-foot (3,199 m) summit Mount Jefferson is 17 miles (27 km) to the east-southeast.

According to the U.S. Census Bureau, Detroit has a total area of 0.96 square miles (2.49 km^{2}), of which 0.59 square miles (1.53 km^{2}) are land and 0.37 square miles (0.96 km^{2}), or 38.4%, are water.

=== Climate ===
The region experiences warm (but not hot) and dry summers, with no average monthly temperatures above 71.6 °F (22.0 °C). According to the Köppen Climate Classification system, Detroit has a warm-summer Mediterranean climate, abbreviated Csb on climate maps.

Climate data for Detroit Dam (1991–2020 normals, extremes 1954–present)
Month	Jan	Feb	Mar	Apr	May	Jun	Jul	Aug	Sep	Oct	Nov	Dec	Year
Record high °F (°C)	67 (19)	75 (24)	76 (24)	87 (31)	104 (40)	111 (44)	104 (40)	105 (41)	107 (42)	92 (33)	74 (23)	66 (19)	111 (44)
Mean daily maximum °F (°C)	43.4 (6.3)	46.7 (8.2)	51.7 (10.9)	57.4 (14.1)	65.2 (18.4)	70.9 (21.6)	80.3 (26.8)	80.8 (27.1)	74.1 (23.4)	60.7 (15.9)	49.4 (9.7)	43.1 (6.2)	60.3 (15.7)
Daily mean °F (°C)	39.9 (4.4)	41.7 (5.4)	44.8 (7.1)	49.2 (9.6)	55.8 (13.2)	61.0 (16.1)	68.0 (20.0)	68.5 (20.3)	63.4 (17.4)	53.6 (12.0)	44.9 (7.2)	39.9 (4.4)	52.6 (11.4)
Mean daily minimum °F (°C)	36.3 (2.4)	36.7 (2.6)	37.9 (3.3)	41.0 (5.0)	46.3 (7.9)	51.0 (10.6)	55.6 (13.1)	56.2 (13.4)	52.8 (11.6)	46.5 (8.1)	40.4 (4.7)	36.6 (2.6)	44.8 (7.1)
Record low °F (°C)	9 (−13)	7 (−14)	16 (−9)	24 (−4)	27 (−3)	36 (2)	40 (4)	40 (4)	35 (2)	25 (−4)	11 (−12)	7 (−14)	7 (−14)
Average precipitation inches (mm)	13.06 (332)	10.00 (254)	10.71 (272)	8.63 (219)	6.02 (153)	3.84 (98)	0.68 (17)	0.92 (23)	2.81 (71)	7.96 (202)	13.49 (343)	15.44 (392)	93.56 (2,376)
Average snowfall inches (cm)	5.6 (14)	2.2 (5.6)	0.9 (2.3)	0.0 (0.0)	0.0 (0.0)	0.0 (0.0)	0.0 (0.0)	0.0 (0.0)	0.0 (0.0)	0.0 (0.0)	0.2 (0.51)	1.3 (3.3)	10.2 (26)
Average precipitation days (≥ 0.01 in)	20.4	18.1	20.5	20.1	16.0	11.3	4.1	3.7	7.2	14.3	19.5	21.0	176.2
Average snowy days (≥ 0.1 in)	1.7	0.9	0.8	0.1	0.0	0.0	0.0	0.0	0.0	0.0	0.1	0.9	4.5
Source: NOAA

== Demographics ==
Historical population
Census	Pop.	Note	%±
1960	206		—
1970	328		59.2%
1980	367		11.9%
1990	331		−9.8%
2000	262		−20.8%
2010	202		−22.9%
2020	203		0.5%
U.S. Decennial Census

=== 2020 census ===
As of the 2020 census, Detroit had a population of 203. The median age was 58.6 years, with 11.3% of residents under the age of 18 and 32.5% 65 years of age or older. For every 100 females there were 89.7 males, and for every 100 females age 18 and over there were 91.5 males age 18 and over.

There were 106 households in Detroit, of which 20.8% had children under the age of 18 living in them. Of all households, 49.1% were married-couple households, 21.7% were households with a male householder and no spouse or partner present, and 22.6% were households with a female householder and no spouse or partner present. About 26.4% of all households were made up of individuals and 10.4% had someone living alone who was 65 years of age or older.

There were 393 housing units, of which 73.0% were vacant. Among occupied housing units, 78.3% were owner-occupied and 21.7% were renter-occupied. The homeowner vacancy rate was 1.2% and the rental vacancy rate was 8.0%.

No residents lived in urban areas; 100.0% lived in rural areas.

Racial composition as of the 2020 census
Race	Number	Percent
White	175	86.2%
Black or African American	0	0%
American Indian and Alaska Native	0	0%
Asian	0	0%
Native Hawaiian and Other Pacific Islander	0	0%
Some other race	3	1.5%
Two or more races	25	12.3%
Hispanic or Latino (of any race)	16	7.9%

=== 2010 census ===
As of the census of 2010, there were 202 people, 96 households, and 59 families living in the city. The population density was 342.4 inhabitants per square mile (132.2/km^{2}). There were 368 housing units at an average density of 623.7 per square mile (240.8/km^{2}). The racial makeup of the city was 95.5% White, 1.5% Native American, and 3.0% from two or more races. Hispanic or Latino of any race were 3.0% of the population.

There were 96 households, of which 19.8% had children under the age of 18 living with them, 53.1% were married couples living together, 7.3% had a female householder with no husband present, 1.0% had a male householder with no wife present, and 38.5% were non-families. 30.2% of all households were made up of individuals, and 9.4% had someone living alone who was 65 years of age or older. The average household size was 2.10 and the average family size was 2.64.

The median age in the city was 51.4 years. 18.3% of residents were under the age of 18; 4% were between the ages of 18 and 24; 13.9% were from 25 to 44; 48.1% were from 45 to 64; and 15.8% were 65 years of age or older. The gender makeup of the city was 49.5% male and 50.5% female.

=== 2000 census ===
As of the census of 2000, there were 262 people, 119 households, and 69 families living in the city. The population density was 496.7 inhabitants per square mile (191.8/km^{2}). There were 383 housing units at an average density of 726.2 per square mile (280.4/km^{2}). The racial makeup of the city was 96.56% White, 1.15% Native American, 0.38% from other races, and 1.91% from two or more races. Hispanic or Latino of any race were 3.82% of the population.

There were 119 households, out of which 21.8% had children under the age of 18 living with them, 47.1% were married couples living together, 10.1% had a female householder with no husband present, and 41.2% were non-families. 33.6% of all households were made up of individuals, and 16.0% had someone living alone who was 65 years of age or older. The average household size was 2.20 and the average family size was 2.77.

In the city, the population was spread out, with 22.1% under the age of 18, 5.0% from 18 to 24, 23.3% from 25 to 44, 33.2% from 45 to 64, and 16.4% who were 65 years of age or older. The median age was 45 years. For every 100 females, there were 103.1 males. For every 100 females age 18 and over, there were 100.0 males.

The median income for a household in the city was $32,250, and the median income for a family was $35,156. Males had a median income of $41,875 versus $22,188 for females. The per capita income for the city was $19,857. About 17.9% of families and 16.1% of the population were below the poverty line, including 44.1% of those under the age of eighteen and none of those 65 or over.

== Education ==
Detroit is served by the Santiam Canyon School District, whose schools are located in nearby Mill City, Oregon.
