= Mill City, Oregon =

- City
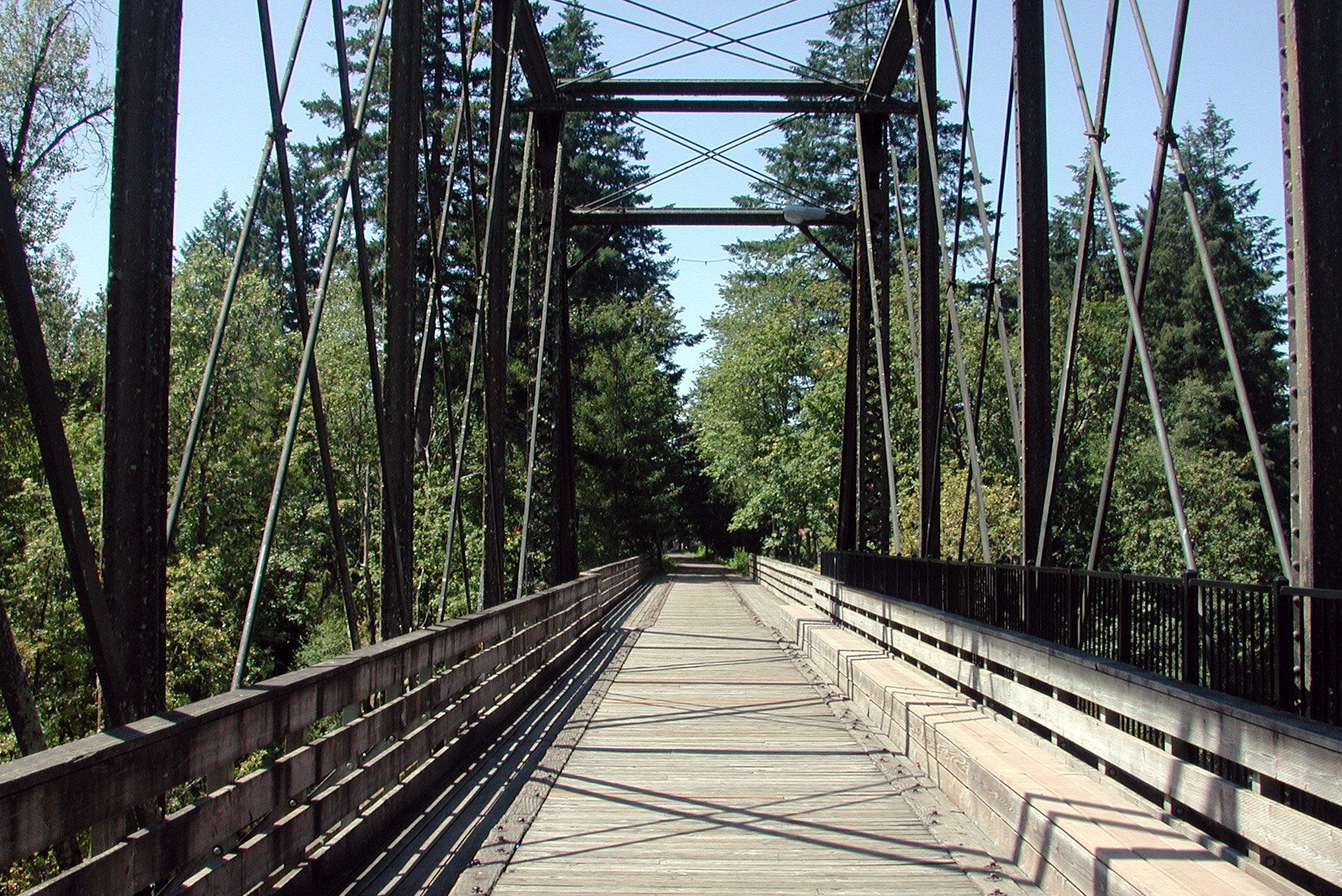
- Pedestrian bridge over the North Santiam River at Mill City

- Location in Oregon
- Coordinates: 44°45′02″N 122°28′36″W
- Country: United States
- State: Oregon
- Counties: Linn, Marion
- Incorporated: 1947

Government
  - Mayor: Tim Kirsch

Area
  - Total: 0.90 sq mi (2.33 km^{2})
  - Land: 0.90 sq mi (2.33 km^{2})
  - Water: 0 sq mi (0.00 km^{2})
- Elevation: 837 ft (255 m)

Population (2020)
  - Total: 1,971
  - Density: 2,186.7/sq mi (844.29/km^{2})
- Time zone: UTC-8 (Pacific)
  - Summer (DST): UTC-7 (Pacific)
- ZIP code: 97360
- Area codes: 503 and 971
- FIPS code: 41-48150
- GNIS feature ID: 2411107
- Website: www.mill-city.or.us

Mill City is a city in Linn and Marion counties in the U.S. state of Oregon on Oregon Route 22. The population was 1,971 at the 2020 census. It is on the North Santiam River, downstream from Detroit Lake.

The Linn County portion of Mill City is part of the Albany–Lebanon Micropolitan Statistical Area, while the Marion County portion is part of the Salem Metropolitan Statistical Area. The City of Mill City contracts through the Linn County Sheriff's Office for local law enforcement, however, it does have its own Mill City Fire Department and other public works departments.

In September 2020, Mill City suffered extensive damage from the Santiam Fire.

== History ==
The city was incorporated in 1941, and serves as the education hub of the Santiam Canyon. It was named and known for its various lumber mills, including Hammond Lumber Company and Santiam Lumber Company. Mill City is now home to two lumber mills, Frank Lumber Co. and Freres Lumber Plant 3.

One of the oldest and best-known landmarks in Mill City is the former railroad bridge, now a pedestrian bridge. The Phoenix Column Bridge, built by Phoenix Iron Works, was manufactured in 1888, moved to San Jose, California, then to Lake Oswego, Oregon, then to Mill City and installed in 1919. Abandoned by Southern Pacific Railroad around 1967, it is now a pedestrian and bike bridge. Current restoration efforts are being undertaken by the Save our Bridge Foundation.

In September 2020, the Beachie Creek Fire swept through the town. Mill City suffered heavy damage from the fire.

== Media ==
In 1926 the Mill City Logue was founded by A.N. Merrill. In 1928 he added content produced by local high school journalists during the school year. In 1930 the newspaper was purchased by Al and Arlene Van Dahl, with Al Van Dahl adding a column on stamp-collecting. The column became nationally popular and formed the basis for a supplemental publication, Western Stamp Collector. In 1933 the Mill City Logue was shut down so the Van Dahls could focus full-time on Western Stamp Collector. Copies of Mill City Logue are preserved on microfilm at the University of Oregon.

In 1944 The Mill City Enterprise was founded by Charles Wolverton. In 1968 the paper was purchased by George and Norma Long, who would run the publication for the next 30 years before selling the paper upon their retirement in 1998. After this its name would change. With a 54-year publication history, the Enterprise remains the longest-running newspaper in Mill City and is currently being archived by the University of Oregon.

In 1998, The Mill City Enterprise was purchased by Tree Fredrickson and Lorie Foster and renamed Independent Press. When Foster died in 2007 her ownership stake passed to her daughter-in-law Sinneme Baney. In 2009 the paper was sold to Bill Downer, a former logger and former mayor of Mill City, and his wife Judy Downer. Following Bill Downer's death in 2014 Judy Downer said it was too difficult to keep up with the publication and the paper closed that year.

Since 2010, the area has been served by The Canyon Weekly, a community newspaper founded by Karen & Tim Widmer and Michelle Gates to cover local and regional news. In 2018 The Canyon Weekly was purchased by Silverton-based Mt. Angel Publishing and maintains a print edition published every Friday and a digital edition.

In 2014 KYAC (FM) was founded by non-profit Santiam Hearts to Arts to "inform and entertain underserved communities in the Santiam Canyon." Programming includes live interviews and performances from local personalities and musicians. The station began broadcasting at 94.9 FM on its initial 100-watt antenna, then in 2022 switched to 90.1 FM after upgrading to a 500-watt antenna. The station is notable for broadcasting during the Santiam Fire evacuation, with Program Director Ken Cartwright sharing public safety information until around 2 a.m. Sept. 8, 2020, when the fire was too close to Mill City for residents to remain.

== Geography and climate ==
Mill City is located at 837 feet (255 m) above sea level in the Santiam Canyon and considered part of the foothills of the Cascade Range. Shaped by the North Santiam River, the canyon is a result of seasonal glacier melts from the southern face of Mt. Jefferson to the east and many tributaries scattered along the canyon, the largest being the Breitenbush River which meets the Santiam in Detroit, roughly 30 miles (48 km) east of Mill City. The looming canyon walls are the most noticeable feature in passing from Highway 22; however, look more like tall hills on the north and south sides of Mill City. Further into town two bridges allow crossing of the North Santiam River.

Mill City is surrounded by forests of evergreen trees. Most notably the Santiam State Forest to the south, forest land is otherwise privately owned, mostly by Weyerhaeuser but also local companies like Frank Lumber and Freres. The forests are primarily dominated by Douglas fir, but junipers and maple trees are also scattered throughout.

According to the United States Census Bureau, the city has a total area of 0.83 square miles (2.15 km^{2}), all land.

== Demographics ==
Historical population
Census	Pop.	Note	%±
1950	1,792		—
1960	1,289		−28.1%
1970	1,451		12.6%
1980	1,565		7.9%
1990	1,555		−0.6%
2000	1,537		−1.2%
2010	1,855		20.7%
2020	1,971		6.3%
U.S. Decennial Census

=== 2020 census ===
As of the 2020 census, Mill City had a population of 1,971. The median age was 39.0 years; 24.4% of residents were under the age of 18 and 19.1% of residents were 65 years of age or older. For every 100 females there were 100.7 males, and for every 100 females age 18 and over there were 99.1 males age 18 and over.

0% of residents lived in urban areas, while 100.0% lived in rural areas.

There were 701 households in Mill City, of which 35.0% had children under the age of 18 living in them. Of all households, 50.1% were married-couple households, 16.0% were households with a male householder and no spouse or partner present, and 23.7% were households with a female householder and no spouse or partner present. About 21.8% of all households were made up of individuals and 10.2% had someone living alone who was 65 years of age or older.

There were 765 housing units, of which 8.4% were vacant. Among occupied housing units, 69.8% were owner-occupied and 30.2% were renter-occupied. The homeowner vacancy rate was 1.6% and the rental vacancy rate was 4.1%.

Racial composition as of the 2020 census
Race	Number	Percent
White	1,695	86.0%
Black or African American	6	0.3%
American Indian and Alaska Native	33	1.7%
Asian	6	0.3%
Native Hawaiian and Other Pacific Islander	1	0.1%
Some other race	33	1.7%
Two or more races	197	10.0%
Hispanic or Latino (of any race)	169	8.6%

=== 2010 census ===
As of the census of 2010, there were 1,855 people, 681 households, and 475 families residing in the city. The population density was 2,234.9 inhabitants per square mile (862.9/km^{2}). There were 742 housing units at an average density of 894.0 per square mile (345.2/km^{2}). The racial makeup of the city was 90.7% White, 0.4% African American, 1.9% Native American, 0.4% Asian, 0.6% Pacific Islander, 2.0% from other races, and 3.9% from two or more races. Hispanic or Latino of any race were 9.2% of the population.

There were 681 households, of which 36.1% had children under the age of 18 living with them, 49.3% were married couples living together, 13.8% had a female householder with no husband present, 6.6% had a male householder with no wife present, and 30.2% were non-families. 22.8% of all households were made up of individuals, and 8.1% had someone living alone who was 65 years of age or older. The average household size was 2.72 and the average family size was 3.14.

The median age in the city was 36.2 years. 27.9% of residents were under the age of 18; 8.2% were between the ages of 18 and 24; 24.2% were from 25 to 44; 26.3% were from 45 to 64, and 13.5% were 65 years of age or older. The gender makeup of the city was 51.8% male and 48.2% female.

=== 2000 census ===
As of the census of 2000, there were 1,537 people, 565 households, and 422 families residing in the city. The population density was 1,940.4 inhabitants per square mile (749.2/km^{2}). There were 629 housing units at an average density of 794.1 per square mile (306.6/km^{2}). The racial makeup of the city was 86.27% White, 0.26% African American, 2.34% Native American, 0.85% Asian, 0.20% Pacific Islander, 6.70% from other races, and 3.38% from two or more races. Hispanic or Latino of any race were 11.39% of the population.

There were 565 households, out of which 35.6% had children under the age of 18 living with them, 60.0% were married couples living together, 11.0% had a female householder with no husband present, and 25.3% were non-families. 20.4% of all households were made up of individuals, and 8.0% had someone living alone who was 65 years of age or older. The average household size was 2.72 and the average family size was 3.13.

In the city, the population was spread out, with 30.1% under the age of 18, 7.7% from 18 to 24, 26.7% from 25 to 44, 22.2% from 45 to 64, and 13.3% who were 65 years of age or older. The median age was 36 years. For every 100 females, there were 102.2 males. For every 100 females age 18 and over, there were 96.9 males.

The median income for a household in the city was $32,321, and the median income for a family was $36,736. Males had a median income of $30,197 versus $20,625 for females. The per capita income for the city was $14,595. About 10.0% of families and 13.0% of the population were below the poverty line, including 19.9% of those under age 18 and 2.2% of those age 65 or over.

== Education ==
In the early and mid-1900s Mill City was served by Mill City High School, which was eventually moved to Santiam High School after its completion in the 1950s. The old high school building was used until the late 1980s as Mill City Middle School but demolished and replaced by a new facility on the same site.

Prior to 2000, Mill City, Gates, Detroit, and Idanha were served by separate schools and districts; however, Mill City eventually became the education center for the Santiam Canyon with the closing of Gates Elementary School in 2012.

As of the 2019 school year, Mill City and the rest of the Santiam Canyon is home to Santiam Preschool/Early Childhood Center, Santiam Elementary School, Santiam Junior/Senior High School and Oregon Connections Academy. Mill City is served by the Santiam Canyon School District.
