= Hannah Bridge =

Covered bridge in Oregon, US

- U.S. National Register of Historic Places
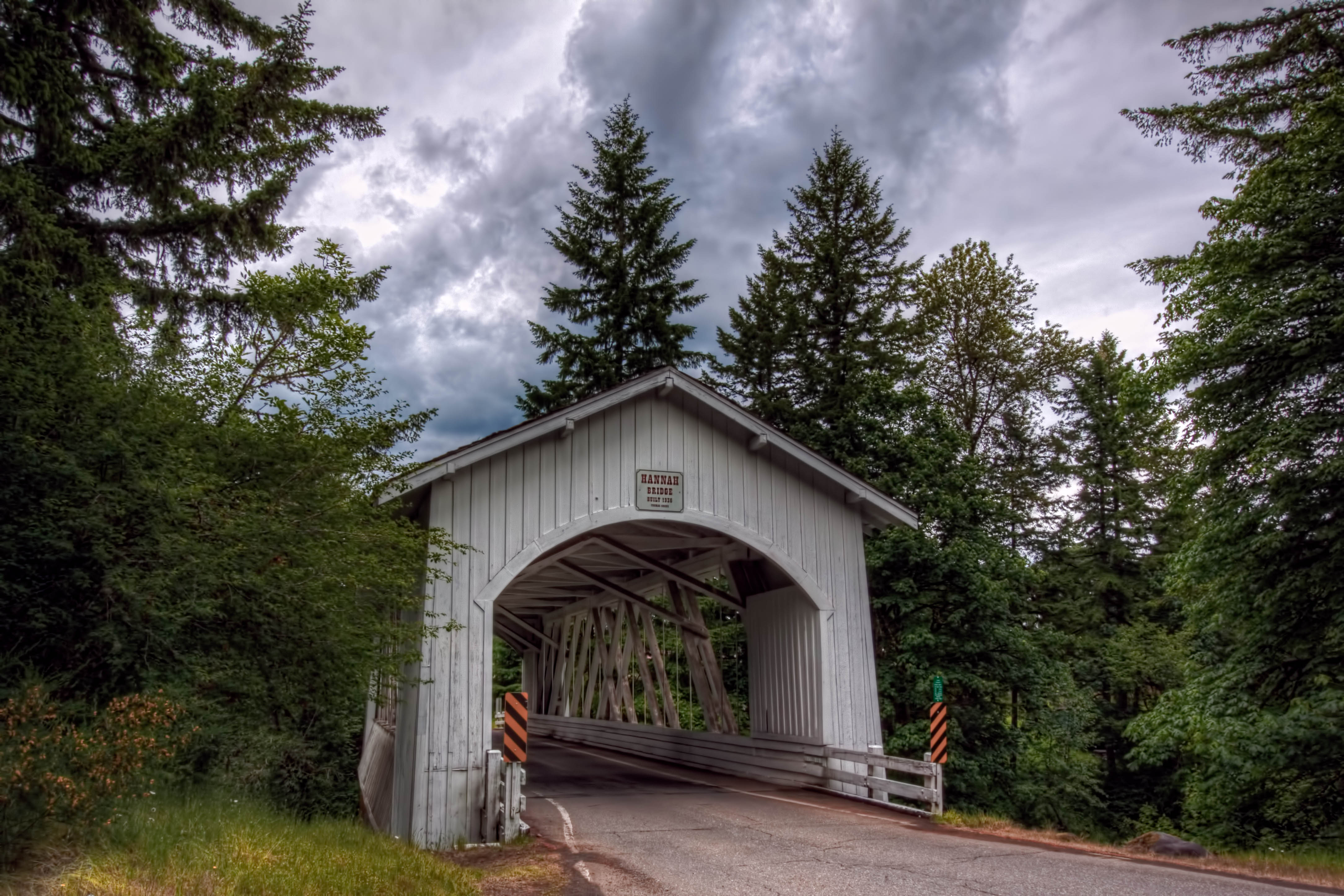
- Hannah Bridge over Thomas Creek

- Location within Oregon Location within the United States
- Nearest city: Scio
- Coordinates: 44°42′43.3″N 122°43′07.3″W
- Built: 1936
- Architectural style: Howe truss
- MPS: Oregon Covered Bridges TR
- NRHP reference No.: 79002116
- Listed: November 29, 1979

The Hannah Bridge is a covered bridge in Linn County in the U.S. state of Oregon. It was added to the National Register of Historic Places as Hannah Bridge in 1979.

Carrying Burmester Creek Road, the bridge crosses Thomas Creek about 1.5 miles (2.4 km) from Jordan. It is one of three remaining covered bridges along Thomas Creek; the others are the Shimanek Bridge and the Gilkey Bridge.

Hannah Bridge, 105 feet (32 m) long, was constructed in 1936. It is named for John Joseph Hannah, a pioneer who arrived in Oregon in 1853 and settled a land claim of 151 acres (61 ha) between Thomas Creek and Bilyeu Creek. He built one of the first sawmills in the area.

== See also ==
- List of bridges on the National Register of Historic Places in Oregon
- List of Oregon covered bridges
