= List of Catholic religious communities in Oregon =

The Archdiocese of Portland of the U.S. state of Oregon is home to several monasteries and other Catholic religious communities.

== Male religious orders and communities ==
- Mount Angel Abbey - Benedictine, Mt. Angel
- Our Lady of Guadalupe Trappist Abbey - Trappist, Lafayette
- Priory of Our Lady of Consolation - Brigettine, Amity
- The Grotto of our Sorrowful Mother Monastery - Servite, Portland

== Female religious orders and communities ==
- Carmel of Maria Regina - Discalced Carmelite, Eugene
- Franciscan Sisters of the Eucharist - Franciscan, the sisters have a retreat center in Bridal Veil and they also run the Franciscan Montessori Earth School & St. Francis Academy in Portland
- Queen of Angels Monastery - Benedictine, Mt. Angel
- Sisters of St. Mary of Oregon - Beaverton

== Former religious orders ==
- Monastery of Our Lady of Jordan, Oregon - Cistercian, Jordan

== See also ==
- The Sisters of St. Joseph of Peace
