= Scio High School =

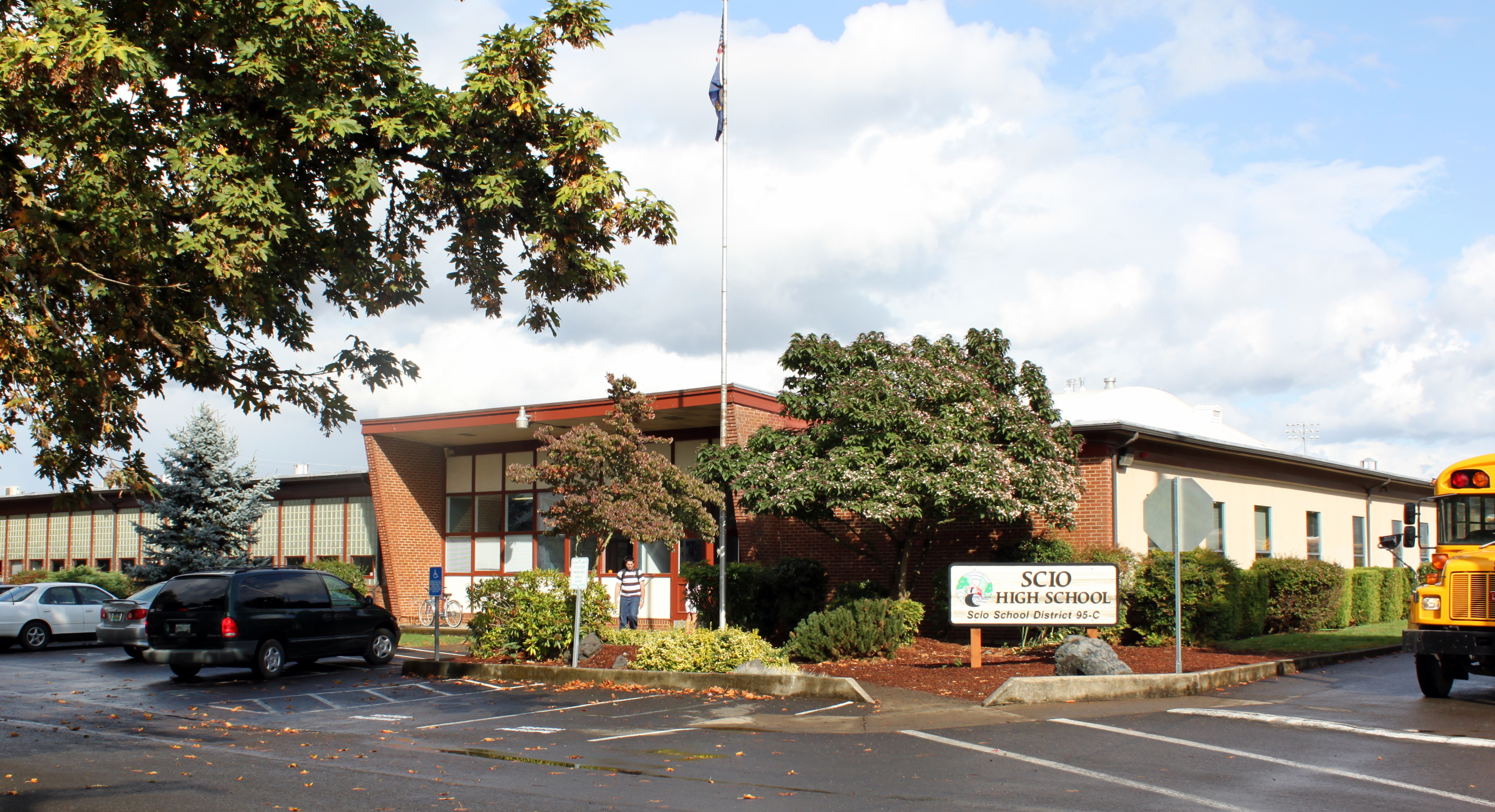

Location
- 38880 N Main St. Scio, Oregon 97374; United States; 44.708838°N 122.848627°W

Information
- Type: Public
- Opened: 1895
- School district: Scio School District
- Principal: Kyle Braa (2024)
- Teaching staff: 16
- Grades: 9-12
- Enrollment: 219 (2023-2024)
- Colors: Orange and black
- Athletics conference: OSAA 3A-2 PacWest Conference
- Mascot: Logger
- Rivals: Regis, Kennedy, Jefferson
- Website: http://www.shs.scio.k12.or.us/

Scio High School is a public high school in Scio, Oregon. The school is one of eight public high schools in Linn County, Oregon. It serves much of the county's northwestern region, with the district encompassing the greater Scio area, including the community of Jordan and the northern reaches of Lacomb.

== Academics ==
In the 2023–2024 academic year, Scio High School had a median class size of 18.5 students, below the state average of 22.5. About 60% of students attended at least 90% of their enrolled school days, compared to the state average of 66%. Despite lower attendance, 87% of freshmen were on track to graduate, slightly above the state average of 85%. The school reported a four-year graduation rate of 96%, significantly higher than the statewide rate of 81%. Additionally, 58% of graduates enrolled in a two- or four-year college within 12 months of graduation, exceeding the state average of 53%. Many graduating students of Scio, who pursue further education, attend Linn-Benton Community College in Albany, OR.

== Athletics ==
In 1976, Scio High School won the first-ever Oregon School Activities Association (OSAA) sanctioned girls' basketball state championship. Competing in the A classification, the state's smallest division at the time, the team finished the season with an impressive 21–3 record. Coached by Kay Mayer, Scio claimed the title with a 51–34 victory over Dayville School in the championship game, held at the Pendleton Armory.

During the 2009 and 2010 seasons, Scio High School's football team achieved a perfect 28–0 record and won two state championships. In the years following, the program has continued to see success, supported by strong community involvement. Notably, alumnus Bernard A. Newcomb, along with other community members, contributed funds toward the construction of a new stadium and the installation of artificial turf in several athletic areas. The stadium features Newcomb’s name on its exterior, with the names of hundreds of community donors displayed inside.

=== State championships ===
- Baseball: 1989
- Boys' Basketball: 1981
- Girls' Basketball: 1976
- Football: 2009, 2010
- Team Wrestling: 1982
- Softball: 2025
- Cheerleading: 2023

== Student profile ==
For the 2023–2024 academic year, Scio High School's student population was 84% White, 9% Multiracial, and 7% Hispanic. Approximately 16% of students received special education services, and 27% were identified as experiencing poverty.

== Notable alumni ==
Bernard A. Newcomb - American Businessman, founder of E-Trade

Doug Mikolas - American Football Player, played for the San Francisco 49ers and Houston Oilers.
