= Thomas, Oregon =

Coordinates: 44.6876222°N 122.9339800°W

Thomas is a ghost town in Linn County, in the U.S. state of Oregon.

== History ==
A post office was established at Thomas in 1898, and remained in operation until 1920. The town took its name from nearby Thomas Creek. Thomas was a station on the Oregon Pacific Railroad, later reorganized as the Corvallis and Eastern Railroad.
