= Stayton–Jordan Bridge =

Bridge in Stayton, Oregon

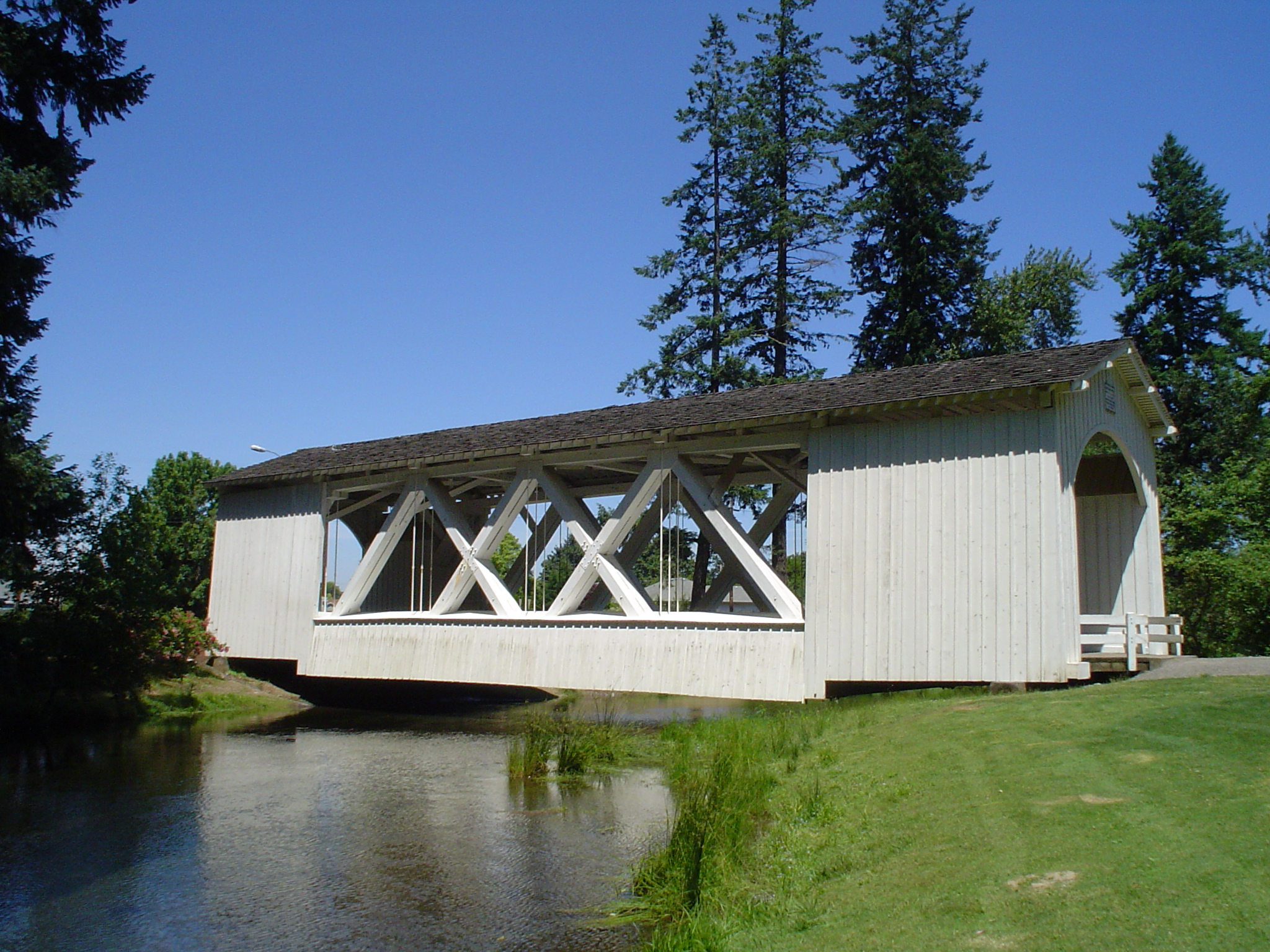
- Stayton–Jordan Bridge in 2007
- Coordinates: 44°47′55.2″N 122°47′09.2″W
- Carries: Foot traffic
- Crosses: Salem Power Canal
- Locale: Stayton, Oregon, Marion County, United States
- Other name(s): Salem Power Canal Covered Bridge
- Preceded by: Jordan Bridge over Thomas Creek, Linn County

Characteristics
- Design: Howe truss
- Total length: 90 feet (27 m)

History
- Opened: 1998 (1937)

Stayton–Jordan Bridge is a covered bridge in Stayton in Marion County in the U.S. state of Oregon. Built in 1998, it carries foot traffic over the Salem Power Canal in Pioneer Park. The canal is a diversion from the North Santiam River.

A predecessor of the 1998 structure was a covered bridge spanning Thomas Creek near Lyons in Linn County. Built in 1937, it was one of seven similar Linn County covered bridges with large side openings. Known as the Jordan Bridge, it took its name from the rural community of Jordan, which was nearby.

In 1986, after Linn County officials decided to replace the bridge, a group of Stayton residents acquired the dismantled structure and, with the help of volunteers and Marine Corps reservists, rebuilt it in Stayton. The rebuilt bridge, spanning the power canal, opened to pedestrian traffic in 1988. However, in December 1994, Christmas lights set fire to the bridge roof, due to kids shooting at the lights with a BB Gun, and the rest of the structure was either destroyed or too badly damaged to be salvaged. Local residents subsequently built a new, nearly identical bridge at the site, and it is the one that opened in 1998. In addition to functioning as a public footbridge, the structure is sometimes reserved for private events such as weddings.

== See also ==
- List of bridges documented by the Historic American Engineering Record in Oregon
- List of Oregon covered bridges
