= David and Maggie Aegerter Barn =

- U.S. National Register of Historic Places
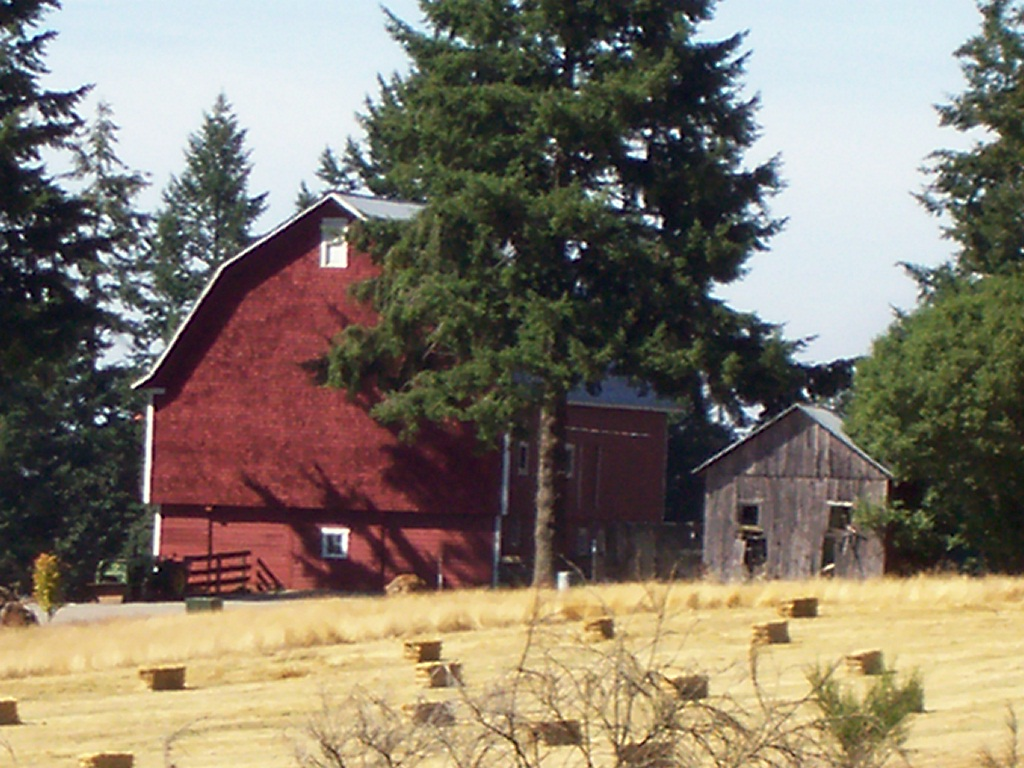
- Barn in 2009
- Location: 41915 Ridge Dr., Linn County, Oregon
- Nearest city: Scio, Oregon
- Coordinates: 44°44′54″N 122°44′37″W
- Area: less than one acre
- Built: 1915
- Architect: Schindler, Anton; Lulay, Nick
- Architectural style: early 20th century barn
- MPS: Barns of Linn County, Oregon MPS
- NRHP reference No.: 99000780
- Added to NRHP: July 15, 1999

The David and Maggie Aegerter Barn is a gambrel-roofed barn in Linn County, in northwestern Oregon, that was built in 1915. It was listed on the U.S. National Register of Historic Places in 1999.

Linn County, at the center of the Willamette Valley, was a tremendously productive agricultural area. The area was settled by 1850, at which time there were already 160 farms. At one time the county produced and exported more wheat than any other area of its size. Barn designs evolved over the years.

The Aegerter Barn is unusual for having an overhang around all four sides of the structure, a feature perhaps relating to Aegerter's Swiss heritage. Aegerter or his forebears had emigrated from Bern Canton, in Switzerland, where overhangs in barns are common. Overhangs protect lower level doors from the elements. It is the only such barn in Linn County.

The barn was designed and/or built by Anton Schindler and Nick Lulay. It is privately owned.

A photo of the barn from the digital collection of the University of Oregon shows decorative medallions on the upper level of one side of the barn. It also shows shingle cladding, perhaps wood shingles, protecting the upper level on that side, while the protected lower level is not shingle-clad.

It is located not far from the Michael and Mary Ryan Barn, the only Pennsylvania Dutch barn in Linn County, which features overhangs on two sides. The Aegerter Barn, the Ryan Barn, and five others were nominated for NRHP listing as part of the MPS study.

It is located at 41915 Ridge Drive, approximately eight miles from the small city of Scio. An aerial photo shows the barn is located behind other buildings in the farm property.

It is a 38 by 48 feet (12 m × 15 m) structure. Its NRHP nomination describes:

The first level has three aisles, arranged longitudinally, and was originally used for livestock stabling and grain storage. The second level functioned as mow space. The most distinctive feature of the barn is its multiple (four-sided) overhang of the upper level mow over the lower level walls. The only barn in Linn County with a four-sided overhang, the design choice may relate to the Swiss heritage of the related Aegerter and Flick families associated with this property.

The farmstead also includes a wood-frame, one-and-a-half-story Craftsman style farmhouse (1924), a pump house, a windmill, a metal barn, and a garage.
