= Monastery of Our Lady of Jordan =

Historic Trappist monastery in Jordan, Oregon

Coordinates: 44.7269°N 122.6998°W

The Monastery of Our Lady of Jordan was a Strict Observance Cistercian (Trappist) monastery in the community of Jordan in Linn County, Oregon, United States, founded in 1904 and lasting for about six years.

== History ==
In 1904, Cistercian monks were forced to abandon the Fontgombault Abbey in Indre, France, after a 1901 secularist-driven French law had given the government control over non-profit associations and threatened the existence of monasteries.

In late summer and fall of 1904, under the direction of their abbot, Fortunat Marchand, six Trappist monks from Fontgombault arrived in Oregon and bought about 400 acres (1.6 km^{2}) of land near Jordan on which to build a monastery. Half of the acreage was cultivated farmland and the rest was woodland and brush. On a tributary of the Santiam River that formed the southern boundary of their property, they built a steam sawmill. There the Douglas-fir timber was converted into lumber for the use of the community and to sell. The monks also grew a variety of produce, including cereal crops, vegetables, pears, plums, and apples. One of the brothers won prizes at the Linn County Fair for his vegetables. In 1905, a dozen more men arrived. Over the next six years, as many as 35 American men tried to join the monks but they "found conditions too primitive or precarious, and all but one abandoned the idea".

The monastery was dedicated in 1907 by the Archbishop of Oregon City, Alexander Christie. Thomas Meienhofer, Abbot of the Benedictine Abbey of Mount Angel, preached the dedicatory sermon, in which he explained the nature and the object of the life of the Cistercians, or Trappists.

The monk's ventures were hampered by the language barrier and a "severe lack of business experience". The high costs of hauling logs also contributed to the monk's financial problems. They tried a dairy, but high interest on loans in the post Spanish–American War era left them in debt. The monks remained hopeful, but their superiors did not tell them about their dire financial situation. The sawmill burned down.

Upon hearing initial rumors of closure by Trappist superiors in Kentucky, a monk named George started a campaign to keep the monastery going. During a 1908 visit from the Kentucky abbot, however, the superior saw the debris from the fire and the monks' financial struggle. Despite George's demonstrative pleading during the superior's visit, in 1909 the monks were ordered back to France. When a letter from Trappist superiors in Rome arrived and explained the reasons for the order, George wrote a letter of submission. Some monks returned to France, but others became Benedictines or priests of the Archdiocese of Oregon City.

The Archdiocese of Oregon City (today part of the Roman Catholic Archdiocese of Portland) took on the monks' debts for a time, and later the Benedictines of Mount Angel took over and resolved the finances. When the Trappists' abbot contracted tuberculosis, the Providence Sisters in Portland took him into their hospital and cared for him for a year free of charge. A group of Benedictine women in Idaho then took over from the sisters and cared for the abbot for the rest of his life.

== See also ==
- Sisters of St. Mary of Oregon
