= West Scio, Oregon =

Unincorporated community in the state of Oregon, United States

- Census-designated place
- Location within Oregon Location within the United States
- Coordinates: 44°42′35″N 122°52′52″W
- Country: United States
- State: Oregon
- County: Linn

Area
  - Total: 0.34 sq mi (0.88 km^{2})
  - Land: 0.34 sq mi (0.88 km^{2})
  - Water: 0 sq mi (0.00 km^{2})
- Elevation: 318 ft (97 m)

Population (2020)
  - Total: 126
  - Density: 371.3/sq mi (143.36/km^{2})
- Time zone: UTC-8 (Pacific)
  - Summer (DST): UTC-7 (Pacific)
- ZIP code: 97374
- FIPS code: 41-80750
- GNIS feature ID: 2584430

West Scio is an unincorporated community and census-designated place (CDP) in Linn County, Oregon, United States. It lies at the intersection of Jefferson–Scio Road and West Scio Road about 2 miles (3 km) west of Scio. As of the 2020 census, West Scio had a population of 126.

== Demographics ==
Historical population
Census	Pop.	Note	%±
2020	126		—
U.S. Decennial Census
