= Gilkey Bridge =

Covered bridge in Oregon, US

- Thomas Creek – Gilkey Covered Bridge
- U.S. National Register of Historic Places
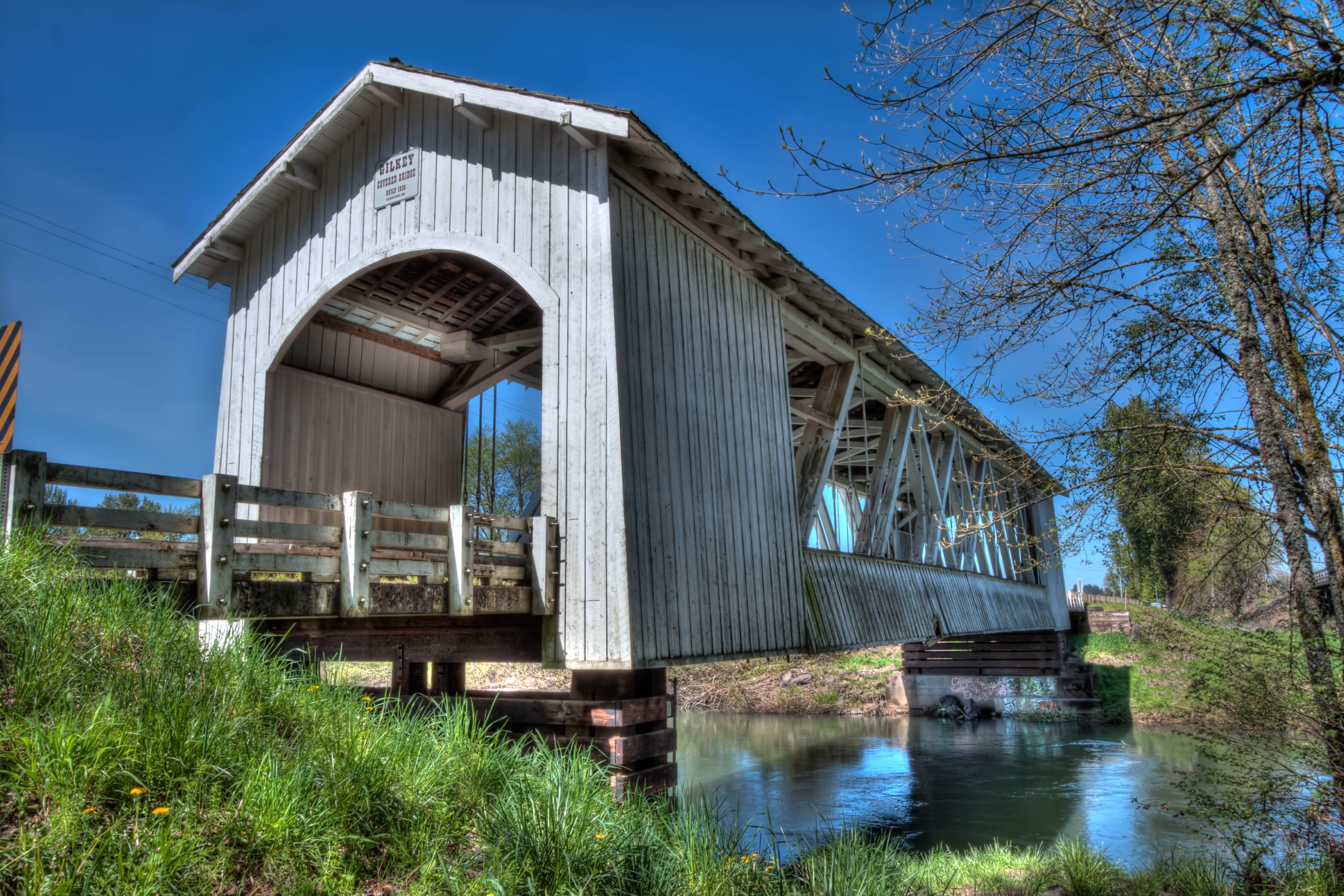
- Gilkey Bridge over Thomas Creek

- Location within Oregon Location within the United States
- Nearest city: Scio
- Coordinates: 44°41′16.4″N 122°54′11.9″W
- Built: 1939
- Architectural style: Howe truss
- MPS: Oregon Covered Bridges TR
- NRHP reference No.: 87000016
- Listed: February 19, 1987

The Gilkey Bridge is a covered bridge in Linn County in the U.S. state of Oregon. It was added to the National Register of Historic Places as Thomas Creek – Gilkey Covered Bridge in 1987.

Carrying Goar Road, the bridge crosses Thomas Creek about 3.5 miles (5.6 km) southwest of Scio. Gilkey Bridge and a covered railroad bridge next to it crossed the creek at the former community of Gilkey.

Gilkey was a station on the Southern Pacific Railway line between Crabtree and Shelburn. The station, established in 1880, was named for Allen and William Gilkey. Allen Gilkey came to Oregon in the early 1850s and settled nearby.

The bridge, 120 feet (37 m) long, was constructed in 1939. Damaged by an overloaded vehicle in 1997, it was closed for repairs, then reopened to traffic in 1998.

Just nine years later, the bridge was damaged again. Scot McKillop, an employee of Fisher Implements, left a service call at a nearby farm and was enroute to Albany when he started to cross the bridge. The hydraulic boom, which had been left extended, snapped power lines before it crashed into the bridge cover. The truck traveled three-quarters of the way across the bridge where it stopped, stuck sideways. There were no injuries, the truck was moved in about 5 hours, and the bridge lost about 50% of its load capacity.

The bridge was rehabilitated in 2017 in a $1.6 million project.

== See also ==
- List of bridges on the National Register of Historic Places in Oregon
- List of Oregon covered bridges
