= Valley Catholic School =

Private, coeducational school in Beaverton, Oregon

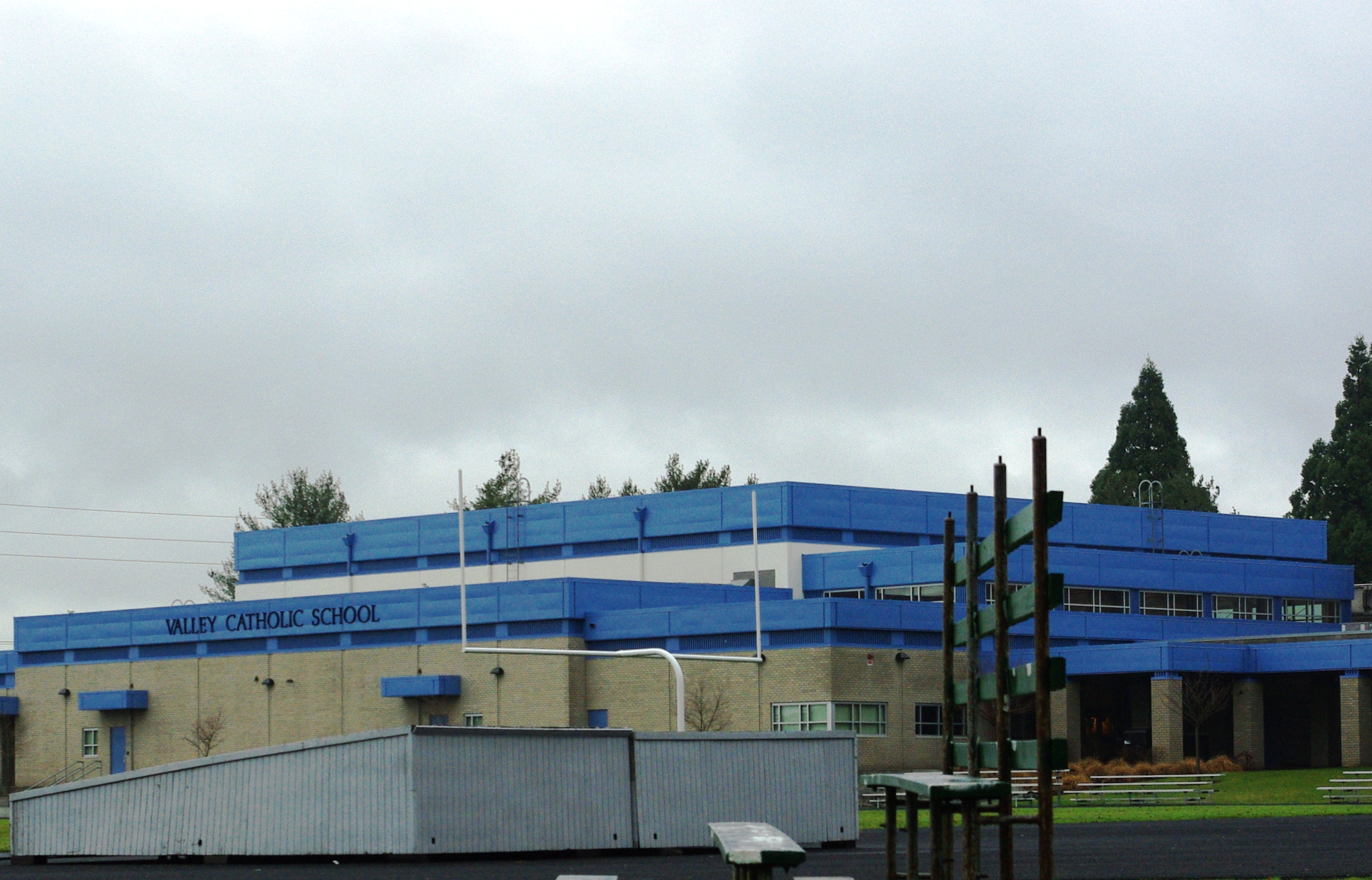

Location
- 4275 Southwest 148th Avenue; Beaverton, Oregon 97078; United States; 45°29′20″N 122°49′47″W

Information
- Former name: St. Mary of the Valley Academy
- Type: Private, Coeducational
- Religious affiliations: Roman Catholic; Sisters of St. Mary of Oregon
- Established: 1903
- President: John Matcovich
- Grades: Pre-Kindergarten–12
- Enrollment: 1,000 (2016–2017 academic year)
- Colors: Royal blue and white
- Athletics conference: OSAA Cowapa League 4A-1
- Nickname: Valiants
- Accreditation: Northwest Accreditation Commission
- Website: www.valleycatholic.org

Valley Catholic School is a private Roman Catholic school in Beaverton, Oregon, United States, within the Archdiocese of Portland.

The pre-K-12 school is a sponsored ministry of the Sisters of St. Mary of Oregon. Until 1991, it was an all-girls school and was named St. Mary of the Valley Academy (colloquially known as "St. Mary's"), but at the start of the 1991–1992 school year boys were admitted for the first time, and the school was renamed Valley Catholic School.

Valley Catholic has been accredited through the Northwest Association of Accredited Schools since 1965.

== Enrollment ==
Total enrollment for the high-school program was 256 in fall 1984, 243 in fall 1985, 230 in 1992, and 330 in 2014. Enrollment for grades 7 through 12 was 375 in fall 1998.

== Athletics ==
The school's athletic nickname is the Valiants. In the fall of 2010, Valley Catholic moved from the West Valley League to the Lewis and Clark League. In fall 2014, the high school sports program moved from being a 3A program in the Oregon School Activities Association's Lewis and Clark League, to a 4A program in OSAA's Cowapa League. Valley Catholic has won two 3A State Titles in Boys' Basketball in 2007 and 2014. Valley Catholic also won back-to-back 4A State Titles in Women's Volleyball in 2018 and 2019.

=== State championships ===
- Boys' Basketball: 2007, 2014, 2026
- Boys' Cross Country: 2011, 2013, 2014, 2016, 2023
- Boys' Golf: 2018
- Boys' Tennis: 2001
- Boys' Track and Field: 2024
- Dance: 2011, 2012, 2013, 2015, 2016, 2018, 2022, 2023 (Traditional), 2023 (Jazz), 2024 (Traditional), 2024 (Jazz), 2025 (Traditional), 2025 (Jazz)
- Girls' Basketball: 2013
- Girls' Soccer: 2013, 2014, 2017, 2022
- Girls' Track and Field: 2014
- Softball: 2001, 2007, 2008, 2009
- Volleyball: 2018, 2019, 2022, 2024, 2025

=== Activities ===
The school's dance team, the Charisma, took home state titles at the OSAA Dance and Drill State Championships in 2010, 2011, 2012, 2013, 2015, 2016, 2018, 2022, 2024 and in 2025.

== Notable alumni ==
- Aparna Brielle, actress
- Daniel Hardy, American football player
- Seema Mody, news anchor and reporter
- Mariel Zagunis, multi-metal olympic fencer
