= Thomas Creek (Linn County, Oregon) =

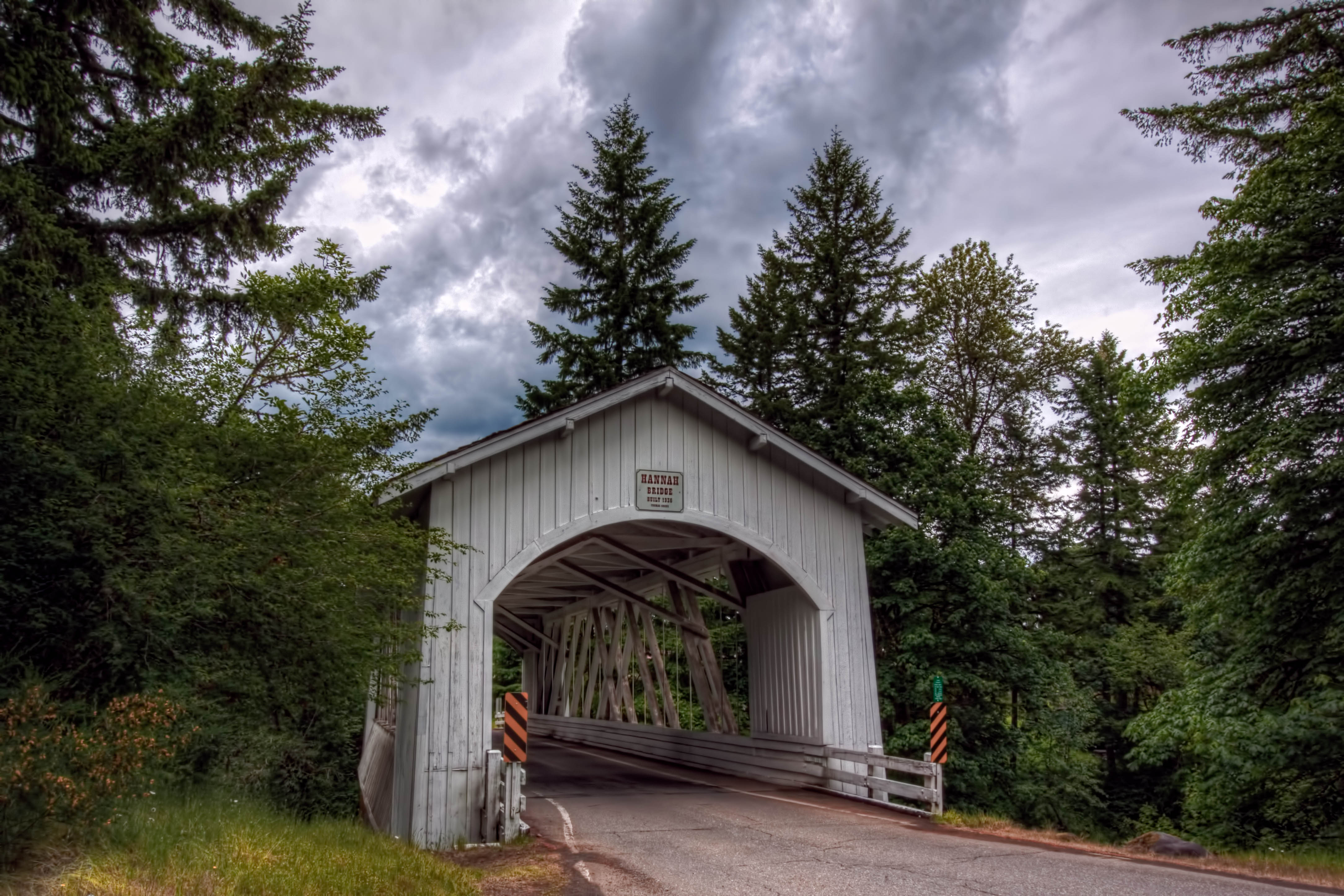
- Hannah Bridge over Thomas Creek

- Location of the mouth of Thomas Creek in Oregon
- Etymology: 19th-century settler Frederick Thomas

Location
- Country: United States
- State: Oregon
- County: Linn County

Physical characteristics
- Source: Willamette National Forest
  - location: southwest of Detroit Lake
  - coordinates: 44°39′59″N 122°18′54″W
  - elevation: 3,734 ft (1,138 m)
- Mouth: South Santiam River
  - location: west of Scio
  - coordinates: 44°40′39″N 122°58′19″W
- Length: 35 mi (56 km)
- Basin size: 117 sq mi (300 km^{2})
- Discharge
  - location: Scio, Oregon
  - average: 487 cu ft/s (13.8 m^{3}/s)
  - minimum: 3.4 cu ft/s (0.096 m^{3}/s)
  - maximum: 27,400 cu ft/s (780 m^{3}/s)

Thomas Creek is a stream, about 35 miles (56 km) long, in Linn County in the U.S. state of Oregon. Beginning in Willamette National Forest on the western slopes of the Cascade Range, the creek flows generally west through Santiam State Forest and farmland to meet the South Santiam River west of Scio.

Three covered bridges, all listed on the National Register of Historic Places, carry traffic over the creek. Two other covered bridges that originally crossed Thomas Creek were moved to parks in cities outside the creek's watershed. Several covered bridges that once spanned the creek were destroyed in weather-related incidents or were otherwise demolished.

The creek at times has flooded Scio, particularly in 1964. The drop in elevation on its upper reaches, coupled with its flow volume, make it suitable at times for whitewater canoes and kayaks. The stream supports populations of smallmouth bass, cutthroat trout, and other fish.

== Course ==
Thomas Creek is a tributary of the South Santiam River. It begins on the western slopes of the Cascade Range at an elevation of about 3,700 feet (1,100 m) above sea level southwest of Detroit Lake, which is on the North Santiam River. The creek flows generally west from its source, receiving Hall and other small creeks before reaching the unincorporated community of Jordan. Jordan Creek enters from the right at about river mile (RM) 19.

Downstream of Jordan, other small tributaries, including Bilyeu Creek, enter before Thomas Creek flows by a stream gauge operated by the United States Geological Survey at RM 14.2. The creek then passes under Oregon Route 226 before reaching Scio. Below Scio, the creek receives Sucker Slough before entering the South Santiam River about 3 miles (5 km) above its confluence with the North Santiam River. The North and South Santiam combine to form the Santiam River, a tributary of the Willamette River.

=== Discharge ===
Based on data collected from 1962 to 1987 and from 2002 to 2013, the average discharge of Thomas Creek at the stream gauge near Scio was 487 cubic feet per second (13.8 m^{3}/s). During those years, the maximum discharge of 27,400 cubic feet per second (780 m^{3}/s) occurred on December 22, 1964, and the minimum of 3.4 cubic feet per second (0.096 m^{3}/s) occurred on September 6, 2003. The basin size above the gauge is about 110 square miles (280 km^{2}), or about 94 percent of the whole basin.

== Floods ==
The entire city of Scio lies in a floodplain with a 1 percent annual chance of a flood. All of Scio was flooded in December 1964, when Thomas Creek and Peters Ditch overflowed their banks. The flooding was generally shallow except near the creek, where it reached 3 feet (1 m) in depth. A flood of this size along the creek is expected, on average, only once in 200 years. The inundation was part of a state-wide series of floods known as the Christmas flood of 1964, rated by the National Weather Service as one of Oregon's top 10 weather events of the 20th century. In January 1972, Scio was flooded again when the discharge at the gauge reached 20,200 cubic feet per second (570 m^{3}/s).

== Covered bridges ==
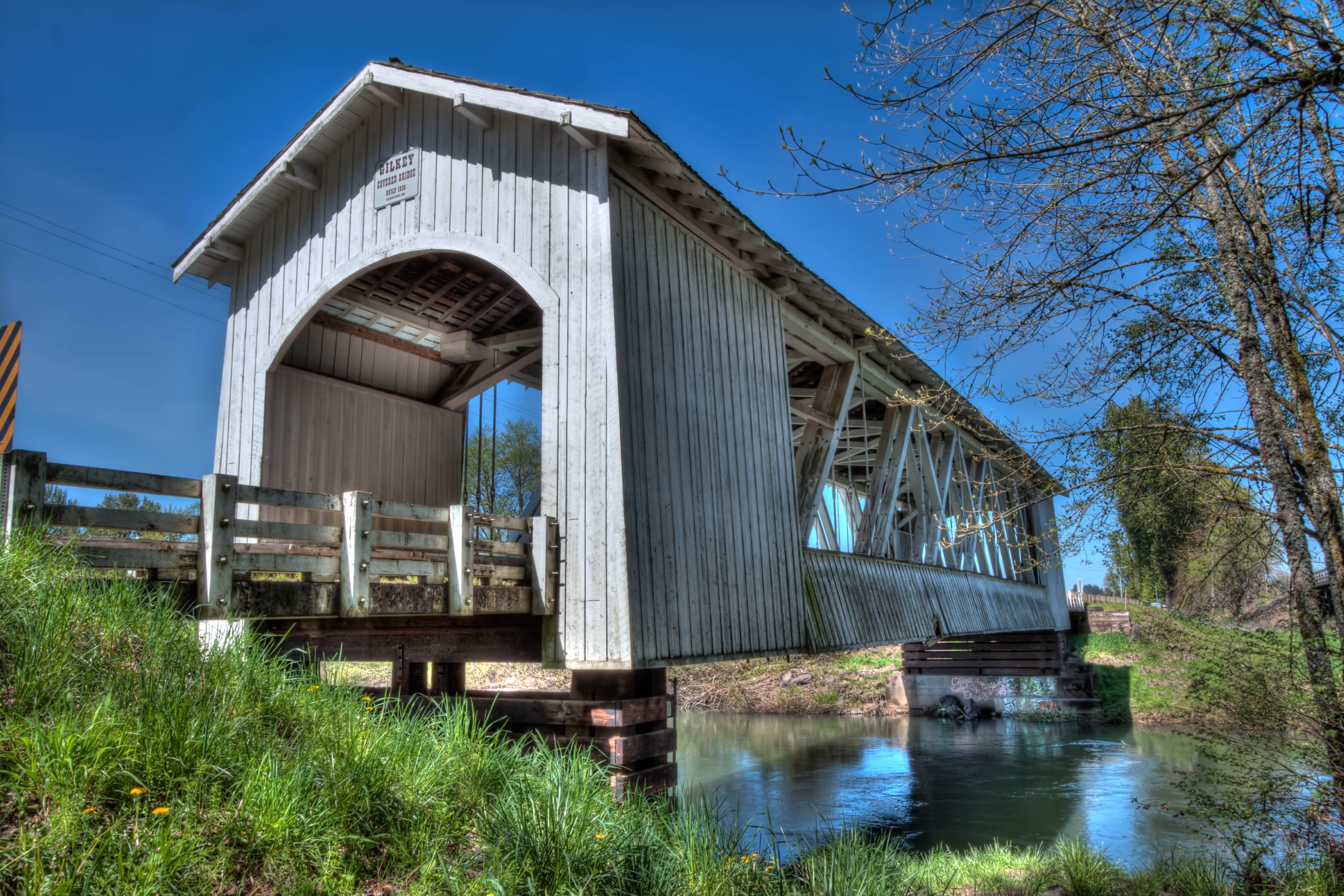
Gilkey Bridge carries Goar Road over Thomas Creek downstream from Scio.

Several covered bridges have spanned Thomas Creek since the late 19th century, some of them replacements for damaged or demolished bridges at the same spots. Three of these bridges—Gilkey, Shimanek, and Hannah—still cross the creek, while two—Weddle and Jordan—have been moved to cities outside the Thomas Creek watershed. The three that still cross the creek are on the National Register of Historic Places (NRHP). The Weddle Bridge was listed on the NRHP in 1979 but delisted in 1991 after its move to Sweet Home.

At roughly 5 miles (8 km) upstream of the creek mouth, Gilkey Bridge and a covered railroad bridge next to it crossed the creek at the former community of Gilkey and its Gilkey Station along the tracks of the Southern Pacific Railroad. The road bridge, a 120-foot (37 m) structure of the Howe truss type, was built in 1939, damaged and closed in 1997, repaired and re-opened in 1998. The companion railroad bridge, a 125-foot (38 m) Howe truss span, was removed in 1962. The Gilkey Covered Bridge carries Goar Road over the creek.

The Weddle Bridge, which replaced an earlier covered bridge at the same site, once crossed Thomas Creek near Scio, at about RM 9. A Howe truss span of 120 feet (37 m), it was built in 1937. In the late 1980s, the deteriorating structure, no longer in use, was scheduled for destruction. Efforts to save it led the Oregon Legislative Assembly to create the Oregon Covered Bridge Program, aimed at preserving the state's covered bridges. Weddle Bridge was the first bridge to win a grant from the program. In 1989, a group in Sweet Home raised additional funds to have the bridge moved and installed across Ames Creek in that city's Sankey Park.

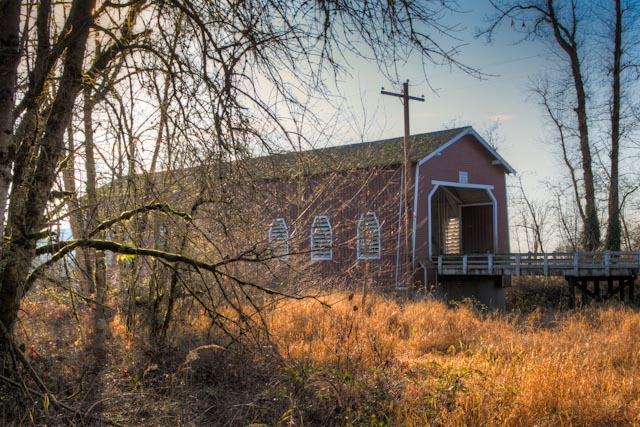
Shimanek Bridge near Scio carries Richardson Gap Road.

Shimanek Bridge, upstream of Scio at about RM 12, is a 130-foot (40 m) Howe truss structure built in 1966. It is the newest and longest covered bridge in Linn County. At least four other covered bridges crossed Thomas Creek at this same spot, the first documented one in 1891. Storms and floods damaged the earlier bridges. The Shimanek Bridge carries Richardson Gap Road over the creek.

About 1.5 miles (2.4 km) downstream of Jordan, near RM 17, the Hannah Bridge crosses the creek. Built in 1936, it is 105 feet (32 m) long and of the Howe truss type. Another covered bridge, built in 1912, is thought to have crossed the creek slightly upstream of the Hannah Bridge but was torn down and its lumber used in farm buildings. Burmester Creek Road crosses the Hannah Bridge.

The Jordan Bridge, built in 1937 at about RM 19, was a 90-foot (27 m) Howe truss span. Dismantled in 1985, its timbers were moved to Stayton and reassembled in that city's Pioneer Park. Destroyed by fire in 1994, it was rebuilt in the park in 1998.

== Recreation ==
The creek supports populations of smallmouth bass and cutthroat trout as well as small runs of Chinook salmon and steelhead. The stream is closed to fishing for salmon and steelhead, but anglers can fish for bass, and catch-and-release fishing for trout is allowed.

Whitewater enthusiasts sometimes run a 5-mile (8 km) segment of the upper creek from Hall Creek to 5-Mile Bridge. This stretch is rated 3 (intermediate) to 4 (advanced) on the International Scale of River Difficulty. Hazards include fast water, rocky ledges, submerged or floating logs, a "nasty chute", and a debris dam.

The next 9.5 miles (15.3 km), from 5-Mile Bridge to Hannah Bridge is also run. It is rated class 2+ or class 3, depending on the flow volume, and at least one portage is required. Hazards include overhanging brush under which the current may sweep a canoe or kayak.

== See also ==
- List of rivers of Oregon

== Works cited ==
- Federal Emergency Management Agency (November 29, 2013). "Flood Insurance Study: Linn County, Oregon, and Incorporated Areas, Vol. 1 of 2" (PDF).
