= Doug Mikolas =

American football player (born 1961)

No. 70, 97, 76, 69
- Position: Nose tackle

Personal information
- Born: June 7, 1961 (age 65); Manteca, California, U.S.
- Listed height: 6 ft 1 in (1.85 m)
- Listed weight: 270 lb (122 kg)

Career information
- High school: Scio (Scio, Oregon)
- College: Oregon Tech (1980); Portland State (1981–1984)
- NFL draft: 1985: undrafted

Career history
- Denver Gold (1985); Toronto Argonauts (1986); San Francisco 49ers (1987–1988); Houston Oilers (1988); Atlanta Falcons (1989)*; New York/New Jersey Knights (1991–1992)
- * Offseason or practice squad member only
- Stats at Pro Football Reference

Douglas Adolph Mikolas (born June 7, 1961) is an American former professional football nose tackle who played two seasons in the National Football League (NFL) with the San Francisco 49ers and Houston Oilers. Mikolas played college football at the Oregon Institute of Technology and Portland State University. He was also a member of the Denver Gold of the United States Football League (USFL), the Toronto Argonauts of the Canadian Football League (CFL) and the New York/New Jersey Knights of the World League of American Football (WLAF).

== Early life and college ==
Douglas Adolph Mikolas was born on June 7, 1961, in Manteca, California. He attended Scio High School in Scio, Oregon.

Mikolas was a member of the Oregon Tech Hustlin' Owls of Oregon Institute of Technology in 1980. He transferred to Portland State University, where he was a four-year letterman for the Portland State Vikings from 1981 to 1984. As a senior in 1984, he was named the Western Football Conference Co-Player of the Year with Gary Swanson.

== Professional career ==
Mikolas was selected by the Denver Gold in the seventh round, with the 94th overall pick, of the 1985 USFL draft. He played in 16 games for the Gold during the 1985 season, recording 4.5 sacks and one fumble recovery.

He played in three games for the Toronto Argonauts of the Canadian Football League in 1986, posting three sacks.

Mikolas signed with the San Francisco 49ers on April 8, 1987. He was released on September 7, re-signed on September 8, and released again on September 12. On September 30, he re-signed with the team during the 1987 NFL players strike. He remained with the 49ers after the strike was over. Overall, Mikolas appeared in eight games, starting three, during the 1987 season, and recovered one fumble. He was released again on August 30, 1988, and re-signed again on September 22. He played in one game for the 49ers that season before being released for the final time on October 25, 1988.

Mikolas was signed by the Houston Oilers on November 11, 1988. He appeared in one game for the Oilers that year, recording one sack, before being released on December 7, 1988.

Mikolas signed with the Atlanta Falcons on April 26, 1989. He was released on August 7, 1989.

He started all ten games for the New York/New Jersey Knights of the World League of American Football in 1991, totaling 38 tackles, one sack, one forced fumble, and one pass breakup. The Knights finished the season with a 5–5 record and lost their playoff games to the London Monarchs. Mikolas also played for the Knights in 1992 and made two sacks.
