= E. C. Peery Building =

- E.C. Peery Building
- U.S. National Register of Historic Places
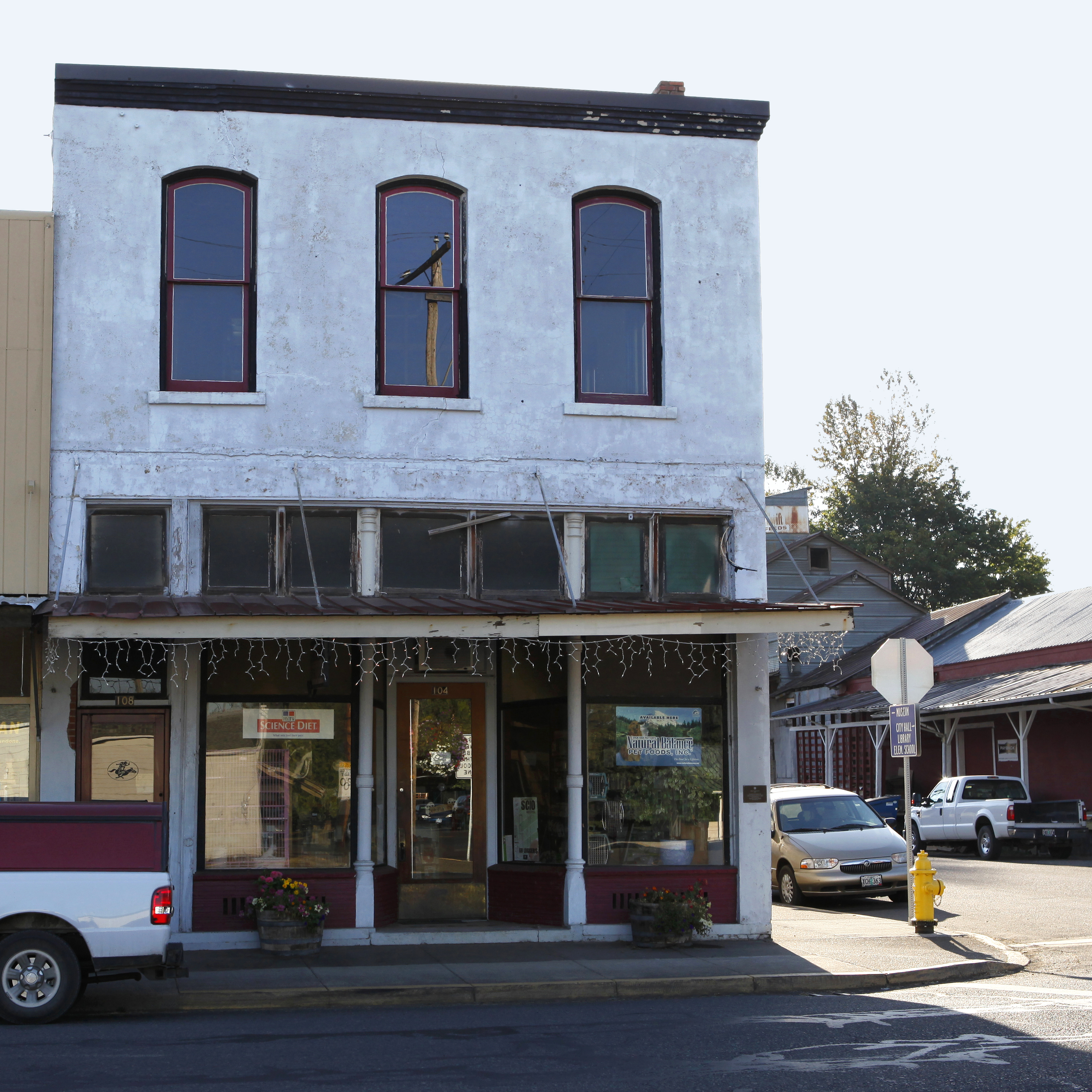

- Location within Oregon Location within the United States
- Location: 38731 N. Main St., Scio, Oregon
- Coordinates: 44°42′18″N 122°50′50″W
- Built: 1881
- Architectural style: Italianate
- NRHP reference No.: 98000604
- Added to NRHP: May 29, 1998

The E. C. Peery Building is a historic building in Scio, Oregon, United States that was built in 1881 in the Italianate style. It was listed on the National Register of Historic Places in 1998.
