= Rowland, Oregon =

Ghost town in Oregon, United States

Coordinates: 44.2945682°N 123.0775898°W

Rowland is a ghost town in Linn County, in the U.S. state of Oregon.

== History ==
Rowland was formerly a station on the now-abandoned Southern Pacific Railroad East Side Line, beginning in the 1880s as an Oregonian Railway station. A post office was established at Rowland in 1886, and remained in operation until 1905.
