= Tallman, Oregon =

Coordinates: 44.5651228°N 122.9684240°W

Tallman is a ghost town in Linn County, in the U.S. state of Oregon. It is located northwest of Lebanon.

== History ==
A post office was established at Tallman in 1886, and remained in operation until 1923. The community's name honored James Tallman, a pioneer settler. Tallman was a station on the Red Electric interurban railroad. A previous Oregonian Railway station at this location was named Lebanon Junction. Tallman was near the junction of the Southern Pacific's East Side and Lebanon Branches. Today the East Side Line has been abandoned and the Lebanon Branch is owned by the Albany and Eastern Railroad.
