= Shimanek Bridge =

Covered bridge in Oregon, US

- Thomas Creek – Shimanek Covered Bridge
- U.S. National Register of Historic Places
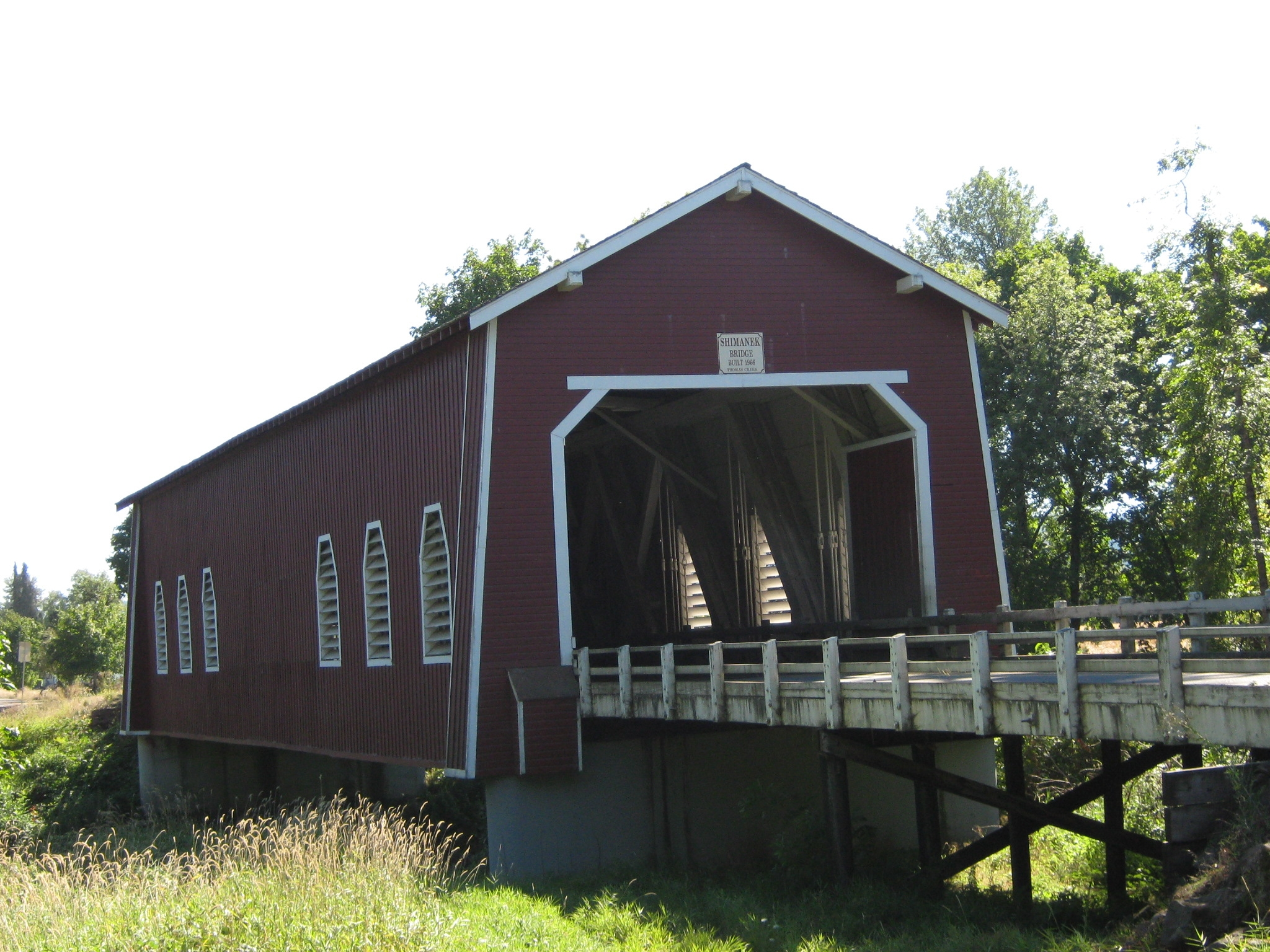
- Shimanek Bridge over Thomas Creek

- Location within Oregon Location within the United States
- Nearest city: Scio
- Coordinates: 44°42′56.2″N 122°48′15.5″W
- Built: 1966
- Architect: W. A. Palmateer and others
- Architectural style: Howe truss
- MPS: Oregon Covered Bridges TR
- NRHP reference No.: 87000013
- Listed: February 2, 1987

The Shimanek Bridge is a covered bridge near Scio in Linn County in the U.S. state of Oregon. It was added to the National Register of Historic Places as Thomas Creek – Shimanek Covered Bridge in 1987.

The bridge, 130 feet (40 m) long, was completed in 1966. Replacing a similar structure severely damaged by the Columbus Day Storm of 1962, it is the fifth bridge at this location. The fourth bridge had been built in 1927, and the first is thought to have dated to 1861.

Carrying Richardson Gap Road, the bridge crosses Thomas Creek about 2 miles (3 km) east of Scio. It is the longest covered bridge in Linn County and the newest. A county crew renovated the structure in 2002, repairing damage caused by a flood in 1996.

In November 2015, the bridge was closed for repairs after an inspection revealed "serious decay". Temporary repairs were expected to take weeks. More substantial repairs may not occur for up to two years, depending on funding.

The bridge was under repair in Spring of 2022.

== See also ==
- List of bridges on the National Register of Historic Places in Oregon
- List of Oregon covered bridges
