= South Lebanon, Oregon =

Unincorporated community in the state of Oregon, United States

- Census-designated place
- Location of South Lebanon, Oregon
- Coordinates: 44°30′12″N 122°53′02″W
- Country: United States
- State: Oregon
- County: Linn

Area
  - Total: 1.18 sq mi (3.05 km^{2})
  - Land: 1.18 sq mi (3.05 km^{2})
  - Water: 0 sq mi (0.00 km^{2})
- Elevation: 390 ft (120 m)

Population (2020)
  - Total: 1,228
  - Density: 1,043.6/sq mi (402.95/km^{2})
- Time zone: UTC-8 (Pacific (PST))
  - Summer (DST): UTC-7 (PDT)
- ZIP code: 97355
- Area codes: 458 and 541
- FIPS code: 41-68875
- GNIS feature ID: 2408767

South Lebanon is a census-designated place (CDP) in Linn County, Oregon, United States, comprising unincorporated land on the south side of the city of Lebanon. As of the 2020 census, South Lebanon had a population of 1,228. The population and area of the CDP decreased between 2000 and 2010 as the city limits of Lebanon expanded southward.

== Geography ==
U.S. Route 20 runs along the northeast edge of the CDP, leading north into Lebanon and southeast 11 miles (18 km) to Sweet Home.

According to the United States Census Bureau, the CDP has a total area of 1.2 square miles (3.1 km^{2}), all land.

== Demographics ==
Historical population
Census	Pop.	Note	%±
2020	1,228		—
U.S. Decennial Census

As of the census of 2000, there were 1,155 people, 411 households, and 325 families residing in the CDP. The population density was 848.5 inhabitants per square mile (327.6/km^{2}). There were 422 housing units at an average density of 310.0 per square mile (119.7/km^{2}). The racial makeup of the CDP was 96.45% White, 0.69% Native American, 0.09% Asian, 0.17% from other races, and 2.60% from two or more races. Hispanic or Latino of any race were 1.99% of the population.

There were 411 households, out of which 33.8% had children under the age of 18 living with them, 64.0% were married couples living together, 8.5% had a female householder with no husband present, and 20.7% were non-families. 17.0% of all households were made up of individuals, and 8.8% had someone living alone who was 65 years of age or older. The average household size was 2.81 and the average family size was 3.11.

In the CDP, the population was spread out, with 26.5% under the age of 18, 10.0% from 18 to 24, 24.2% from 25 to 44, 23.7% from 45 to 64, and 15.7% who were 65 years of age or older. The median age was 37 years. For every 100 females, there were 98.8 males. For every 100 females age 18 and over, there were 94.3 males.

The median income for a household in the CDP was $31,172, and the median income for a family was $32,656. Males had a median income of $31,985 versus $23,750 for females. The per capita income for the CDP was $15,247. About 10.1% of families and 8.9% of the population were below the poverty line, including 8.5% of those under age 18 and none of those age 65 or over.
