= Joseph Wesely House and Barn =

- U.S. National Register of Historic Places
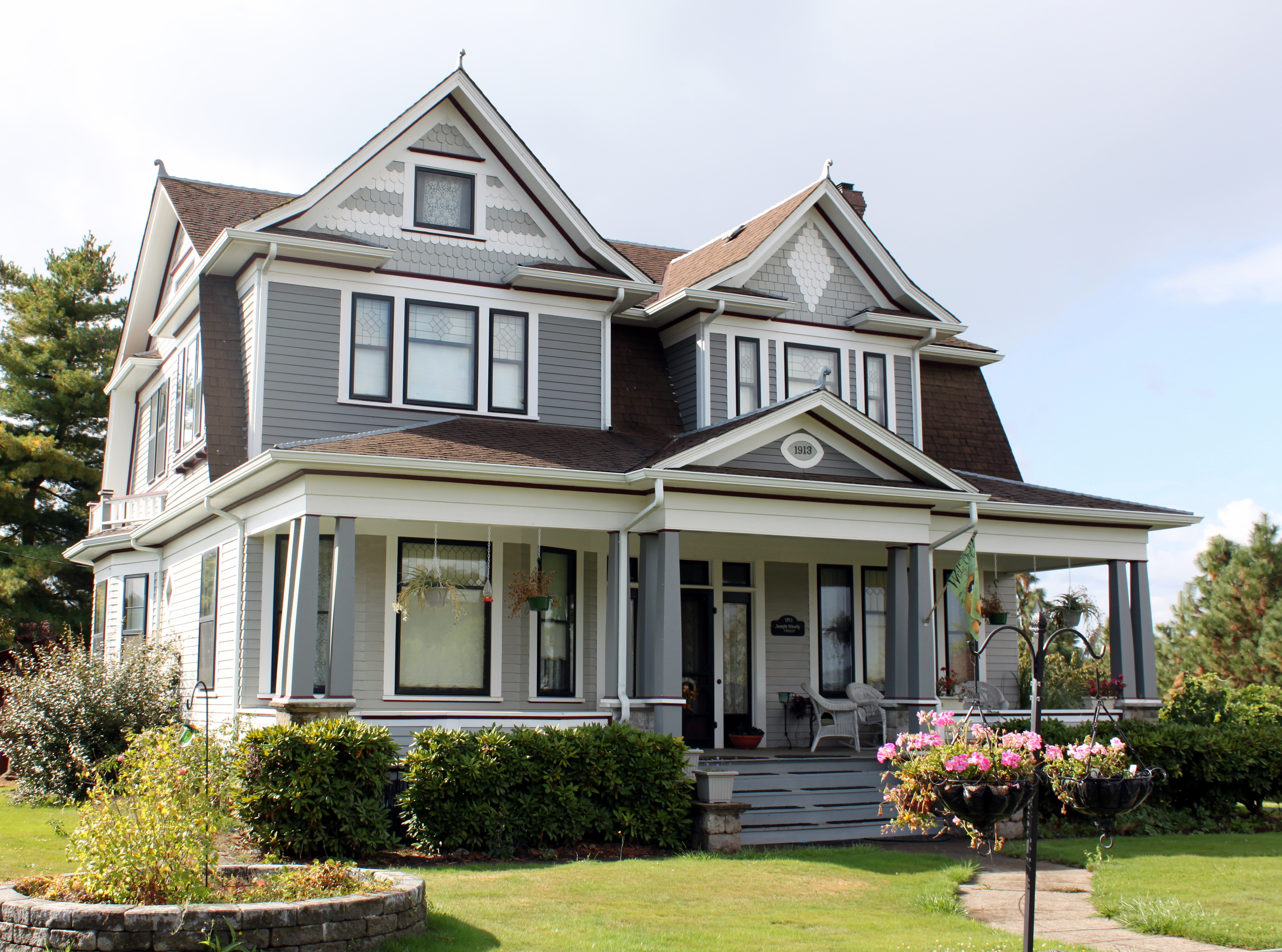
- The Wesely House in 2009
- Location: 38791 Highway 226; Scio, Oregon
- Coordinates: 44°41′51″N 122°50′57″W
- Area: 3.83 acres (1.55 ha)
- Built: 1913 (house and barn); 1920 (garage)
- Built by: Thomas B. Prospal (house and barn); Joseph Wesely (garage)
- Architectural style: Craftsman, with Colonial Revival details
- NRHP reference No.: 86002903
- Added to NRHP: October 23, 1986

The Joseph Wesely House and Barn are a historic homestead ensemble in Scio, Oregon, United States. The historic portions of the ensemble consist of the house, barn, and a garage, while the whole property includes other non-historic structures.

The ensemble was listed on the National Register of Historic Places in 1986.

== See also ==
- National Register of Historic Places listings in Linn County, Oregon
