= Kingston, Oregon =

Unincorporated community in the state of Oregon, United States

- Unincorporated community
- Location within Oregon Location within the United States
- Coordinates: 44°47′01″N 122°46′27″W
- Country: United States
- State: Oregon
- County: Linn
- Elevation: 535 ft (163 m)
- Time zone: UTC-8 (Pacific (PST))
  - Summer (DST): UTC-7 (PDT)
- GNIS feature ID: 1122772

Kingston is an unincorporated community near Stayton, Oregon in Linn County, Oregon, United States. Kingston's post office opened in 1891 and closed in 1920.
