= Our Lady of Guadalupe Trappist Abbey =

Trappist monastery near Lafayette, Oregon

Coordinates: 45.284°N 123.091°W

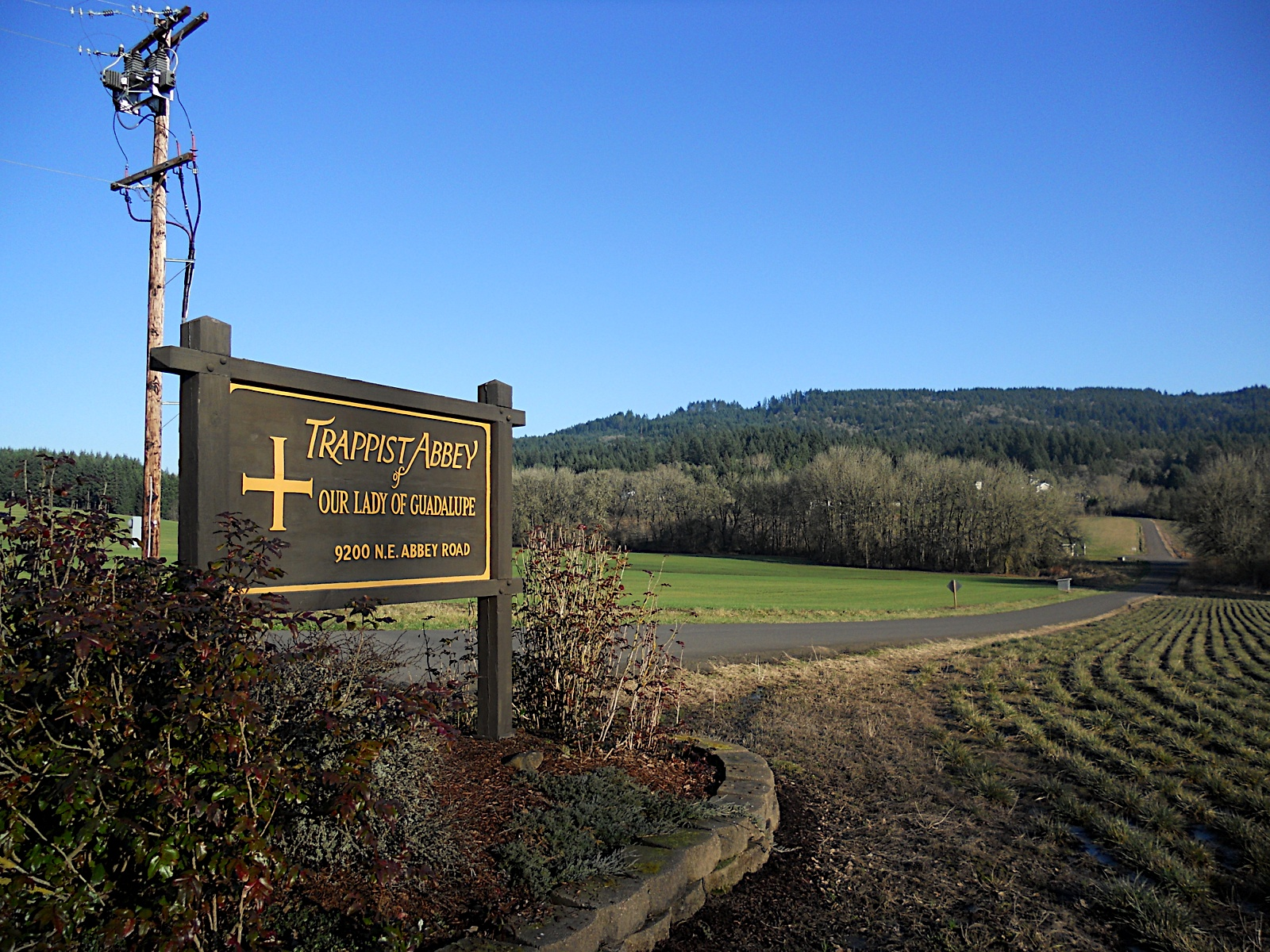
- Entrance to the monastery property
- Interactive map of Our Lady of Guadalupe Trappist Abbey

Monastery information
- Order: Trappist
- Denomination: Catholic
- Established: April 1948 (in New Mexico)
- Dedication: Our Lady of Guadalupe
- Archdiocese: Portland in Oregon

Site
- Location: Yamhill County, Oregon
- Country: United States
- Public access: Yes
- Website: trappistabbey.org

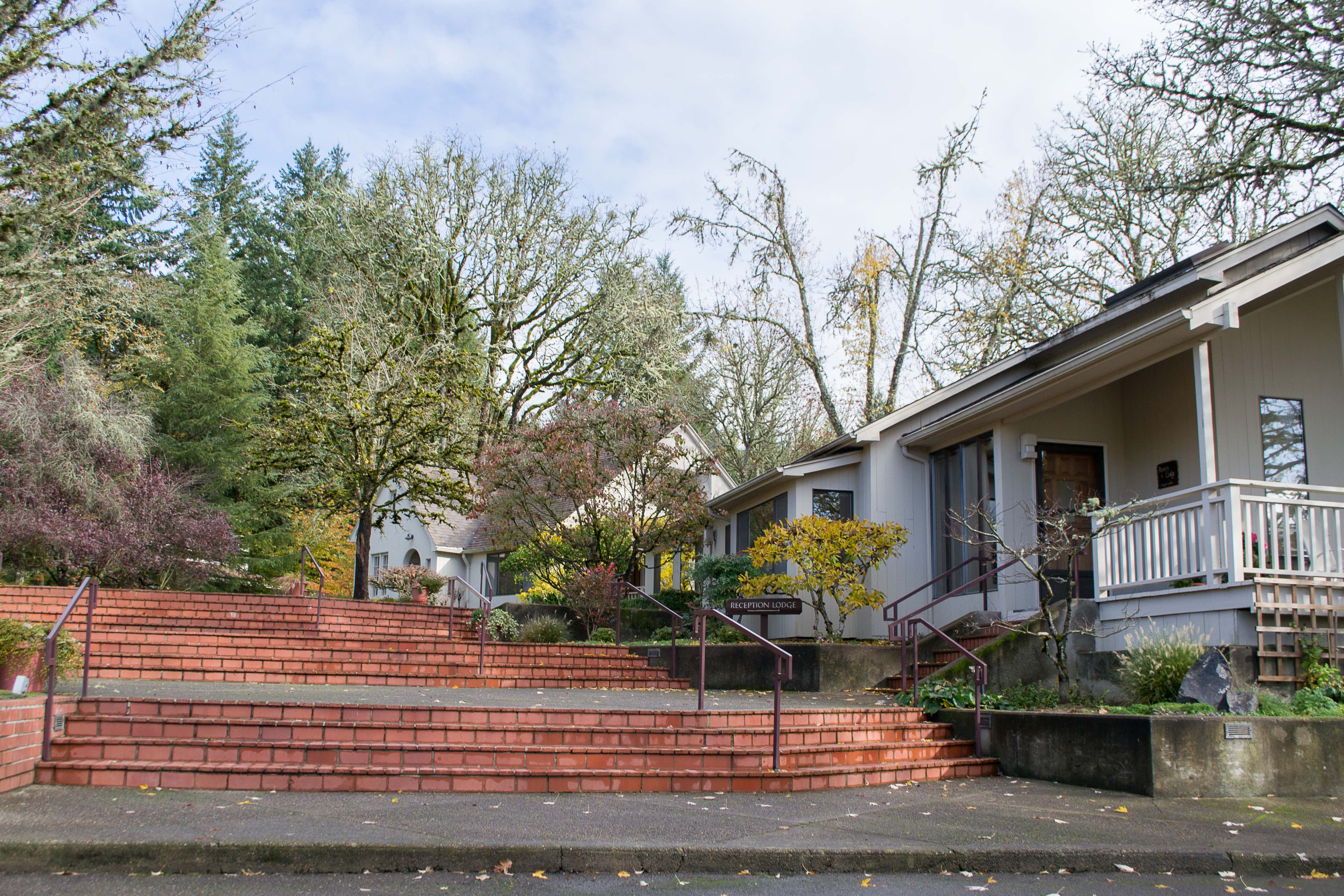
The Abbey in 2013

Our Lady of Guadalupe Trappist Abbey is a Trappist monastery located in Yamhill County, Oregon in the United States, north of Lafayette and about 30 miles (48 km) southwest of Portland.

The abbey began in April 1948 in Pecos, New Mexico as a foundation established by the Trappist community at Valley Falls, Rhode Island which later became St. Joseph's Abbey in Spencer, Massachusetts. The foundation in Pecos was dedicated to Our Lady of Guadalupe, owing to the Mexican influence in the southwestern U.S. In March 1955, the monks, not finding farming sufficiently productive in northern New Mexico, sold the property to Benedictine monks and moved the abbey to its present site in Oregon.

The abbey is located on 1,300 acres (530 ha) of forestland in low hills of the western Willamette Valley. The forest adds to the spiritual setting for the community, acts as a buffer to neighbors, and allows for cloistered retreat. It is also the basis for a sustainable forestry enterprise that provides income to the monks. Other income-generating enterprises include a book bindery, a wine warehouse for local wineries, and a fruitcake bakery. The abbey serves as a spiritual sanctuary for guests. The monks operate a non-denominational retreat facility for both men and women who stay in small cottages and make use of a library and a meditation hall.

A new 10,000-square-foot (930 m^{2}) church was built in 2007, combining traditional Cistercian architecture with Pacific Northwest design elements. As of early 2025, the Abbey is home to approximately 12 monks. The monks live communally in the abbey. Their day is balanced by prayer, work, reading, and contemplation.
