= Sisters of St. Mary of Oregon =

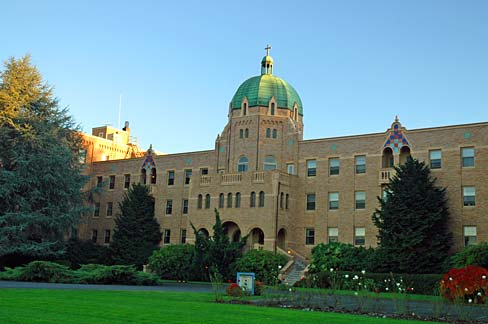
- Main building, constructed in 1930
- Abbreviation: SSMO
- Named after: Mary, mother of Jesus
- Formation: 1886
- Founder: William Hickley Gross, CSsR
- Founded at: Sublimity, Oregon
- Type: Religious order (Catholic)
- Headquarters: Beaverton, Oregon
- Members: Foundresses: Mother Wilhelmina; Sr. Clara; Sr. Josephine; Sr. Cecilia; Sr. Benedict; Sr. Gertrude; Sr. Aloysius; Sr. Rose; Sr. Johanna; Sr. Magdalene
- Affiliations: Catholic Church
- Website: https://www.ssmo.org/
- Formerly called: Sisters of the Most Precious Blood

The Sisters of St. Mary of Oregon (abbreviated SSMO), formerly known as the Sisters of the Most Precious Blood, is a Catholic religious congregation founded in 1886 in the U.S. state of Oregon. The sisters' convent is located in Beaverton and they are independent from the Archdiocese of Portland.

The Sisters provide lifelong learning opportunities through programs and speaker series. Their sponsored ministries include Valley Catholic School and Maryville Care. The Sisters of St. Mary of Oregon Ministries Corporation and the Sisters of St. Mary of Oregon Foundation provide administrative and developmental support to the sponsored ministries.

== History ==
=== Founding ===
In 1843 the Missionaries of the Precious Blood migrated from Germany to the United States, settling in Ohio. They were soon joined by the Sisters of the Precious Blood. In 1866, a dispute occurred within the Precious Blood community. As a result, Father Joseph Albrecht (along with a group of parishioners, Sisters, and Brothers), left the community. The group traveled to Minnesota, then (following Father Albrecht's death) to Jordan, Oregon. By 1885 members of this schismatic religious colony began to question the decisions of the new leadership. As a result, nine women left the community and were invited to stay with the Benedictines of Mount Angel Abbey. Archbishop William Hickley Gross visited the colony and laid out a plan for reconciliation with the Catholic Church. The group's elders rejected the plan, but the women asked to come along with the bishop, who wanted them to become a formal religious community. After several months of living with the Catholic institute of the Benedictine Sisters of Mt. Angel at the Queen of Angels Monastery, the Sisters refounded their order, moved to Sublimity, and began their new life as the Sisters of the Most Precious Blood. They changed their name to Sisters of St. Mary of Oregon in 1905.

On March 25, 1887, five of the Sisters made their first Profession of Vows: Theresa Arnold, Emma Bleily, Cecilia Boedigheimer, Josephine Eifert, and Clara Hauck. Emma Bleily took the name Wilhelmina in honor of Archbishop William Gross. She was elected as the first Mother General of the community at the age of 29, and became known as Mother Wilhelmina Bleily. Mother Wilhelmina is known as one of the nine Foundresses of the community.

=== St. Mary's Orphanage ===
In 1889, Archbishop Gross approved construction of St. Mary's Orphanage in Beaverton, Oregon and asked the Sisters to staff it. By June 1891, three Sisters were serving in Sublimity, three were serving in Verboort, Oregon, and all of the other Sisters had moved to Beaverton. The Sisters lived at the orphanage where they cared for sixty children, tended to the building, and harvested crops.

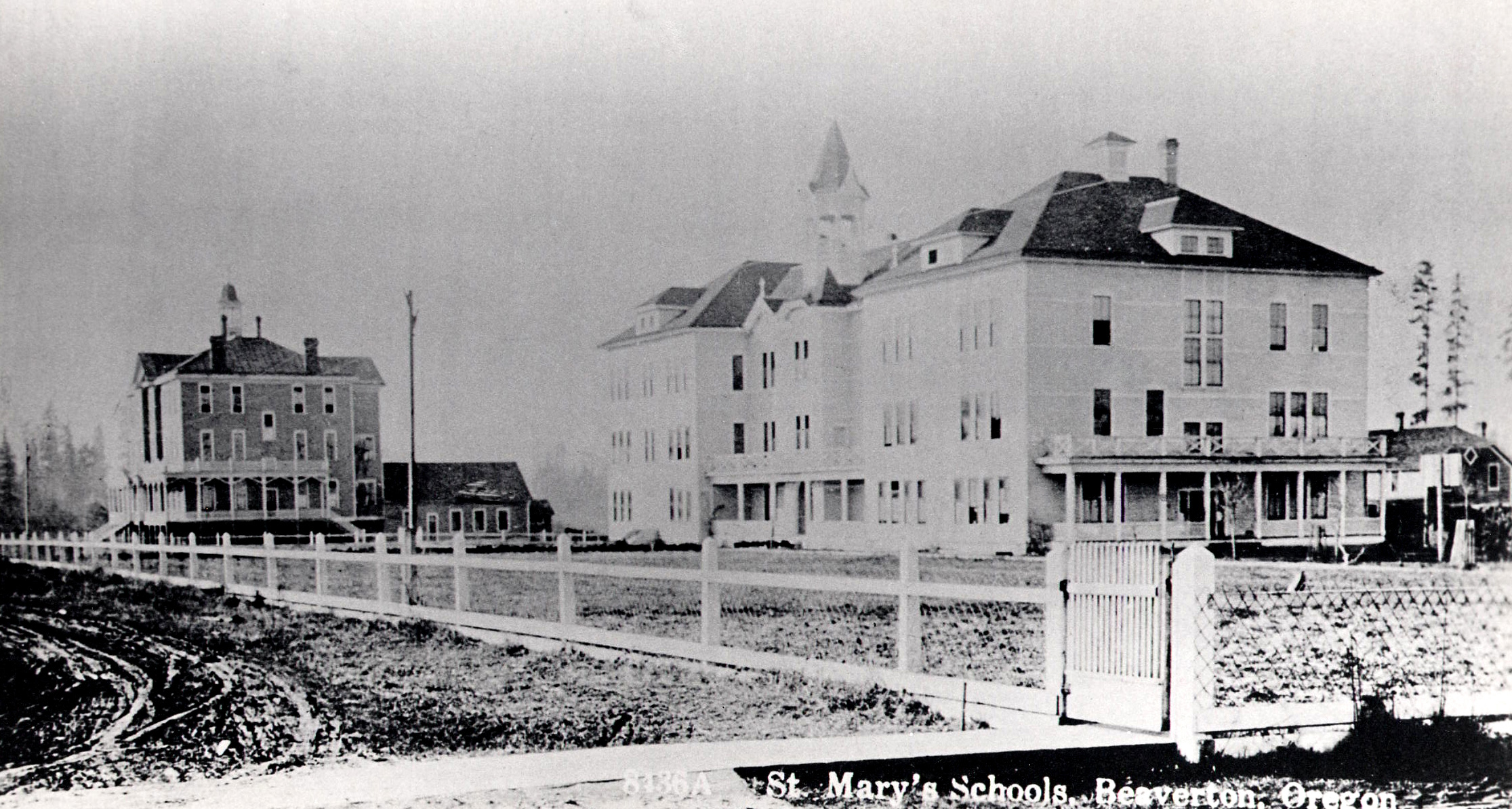
The complex in 1906

Mother Seraphim Theisen the community's second Mother General, built a home nearby which became the community's first Motherhouse. On January 18, 1894, Archbishop Gross dedicated the Motherhouse to Our Lady of Perpetual Help.

Presently, the Sisters reside in a new Motherhouse, across the street from the original building. The orphanage was run by the Sisters until June 16, 1953. It is now run by the state of Oregon and has been renamed to St. Mary's Home for Boys.

=== Early twentieth century ===
In 1901, under Mother Theresa Heuberger, the Community adopted English as its official language (up until this point the community had used German as its primary language).

In January 1903, the Sisters opened a boarding school on their campus which served both boys and girls: St. Mary's Academy.

On August 12, 1905, Archbishop Alexander Christie asked the Sisters to approve three significant changes:

1. He requested that they rename their boarding school so that it would not be confused with St. Mary's Academy in downtown Portland. The boarding school became St. Mary's Institute.
2. Since there was another Precious Blood community in Portland, he requested they change the name of their community as well. They became the Sisters of St. Mary of Oregon.
3. As Sisters of the Precious Blood, they had worn red cinctures (belts). With their new name change, the Archbishop asked them to wear black cintures instead. They agreed.

The Sisters expanded their complex, adding both an east and west wing to the Motherhouse (in 1902 and 1905 respectively), and purchasing nearby property. In 1930, the Sisters began construction on the nearby property, constructing what is now their present Motherhouse. The first phase of the Motherhouse included the main building and west wing. The Sister took up residence there on September 22, 1930. It was another six years before their chapel was complete. It was dedicated to Our Lady of Perpetual Help on March 19, 1936. It would be more than a decade before the west wing would be added in the early 1950s.

=== Mid twentieth century ===
The Sisters' campus, known then as St. Mary of the Valley, continued to develop. In 1949, a "park house" named Villa Maria was built by James Kinch, father of Sister Delores Kinch. This is a place of recreation for the Sisters which stands to this day. In 1950, the east wing of the new Motherhouse was completed under the direction of Mother Colette Lorch. This enabled the community to continue to grow in its membership.

The Sisters continued to work in education. They opened a number of schools in Oregon, and in 1958 Mother Collete Lorch authorized the Sisters to begin teaching in Spokane, Washington.

In 1957, Sister Imelda Vandehey received the first of two papal recognitions, the Pope Pius X medal for her ministry in education. In 1959, she received the Pro Ecclesia et Pontifice medal for her service to the Church.

During this time, the Sisters decided to start a health care ministry. In 1963, Maryville Nursing Home was built on their Beaverton campus and dedicated under Mother Angela Lehman.

The Sisters continued to extend the reach of the ministries when Mother Angela Lehman approved their first international mission. In 1966, she approved four Sisters, including herself, to minister in Peru. There they helped to staff schools in Tamshiyacu and minister to residents along the Amazon River.

Back home in Oregon, a number of Catholic schools began closing in the early 1970s. The years following the Second Vatican Counsel were challenging as changes took place in the Catholic Church. During this time, many Sisters made the decision to leave the Community. This led to the Community withdrawing from teaching in several schools.

Despite the trend of school closures, the Sisters decided to expand their school at St. Mary of the Valley. At the time, the west wing of the Motherhouse served as an all girls' school for students in elementary through high school grades. In 1969, Mother Consilia Mosey built a new high school on the campus, enabling the school to expand at all grade levels.
