= Shelburn, Oregon =

Coordinates: 44.7360°N 122.8706°W

Shelburn is an unincorporated community and ghost town located in Linn County, Oregon, United States, established in the 1850s. The town experienced a significant number of deaths in the 1860s during the third cholera pandemic along the Oregon Trail. A blacksmith shop in the city dates to the 1890s.
