= Scio, Oregon =

- City
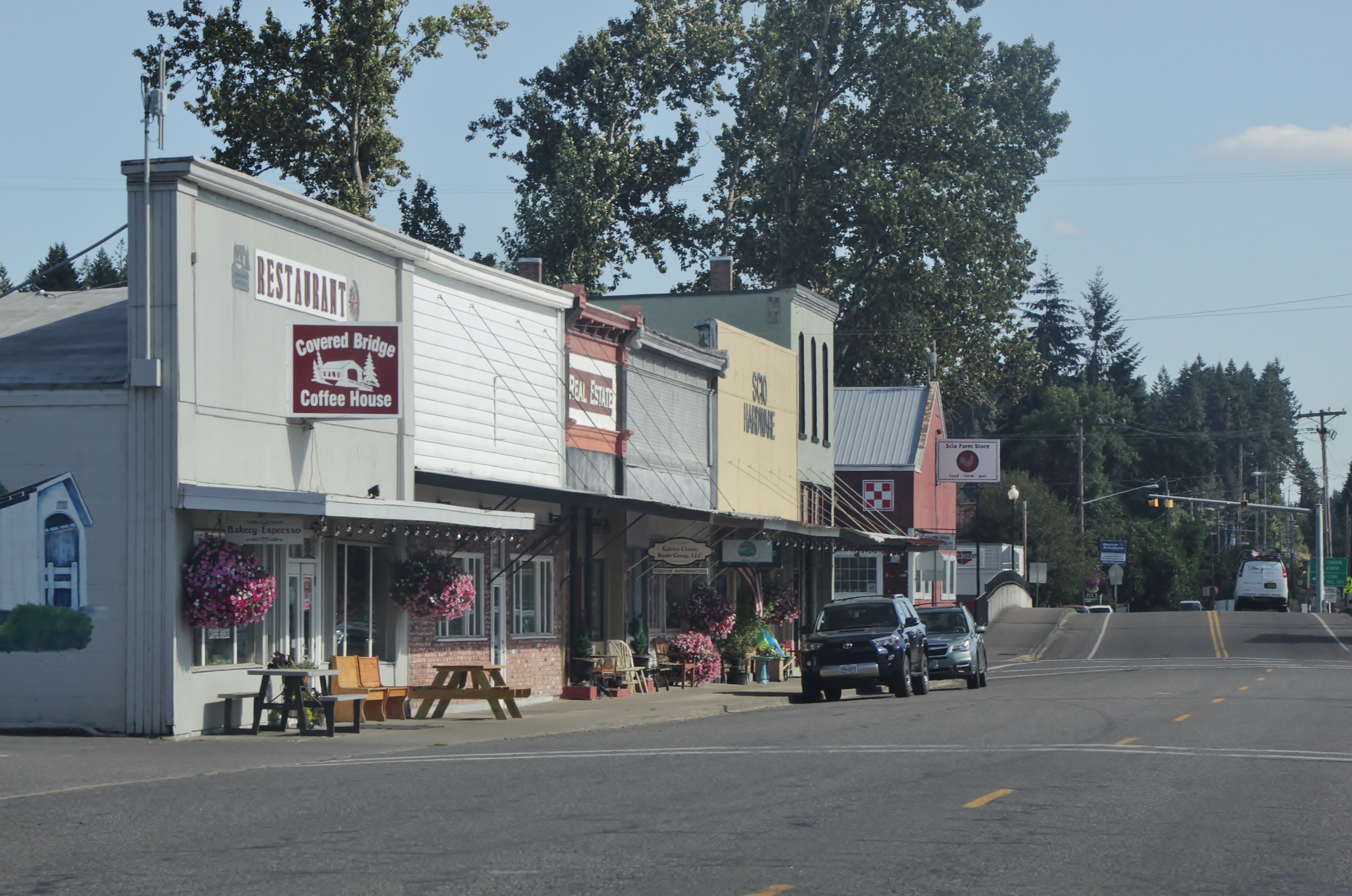
- Storefronts on Main Street in Scio in 2021

- Location in Oregon
- Coordinates: 44°42′15″N 122°51′04″W
- Country: United States
- State: Oregon
- County: Linn
- Incorporated: 1866

Government
  - Mayor: Debbie Nuber

Area
  - Total: 0.44 sq mi (1.13 km^{2})
  - Land: 0.44 sq mi (1.13 km^{2})
  - Water: 0 sq mi (0.00 km^{2})
- Elevation: 312 ft (95 m)

Population (2020)
  - Total: 956
  - Density: 2,200.0/sq mi (849.42/km^{2})
- Time zone: UTC-8 (Pacific)
  - Summer (DST): UTC-7 (Pacific)
- ZIP code: 97374
- Area code: 503
- FIPS code: 41-65650
- GNIS feature ID: 2411840
- Website: www.sciooregon.gov

Scio (/ˈsaɪoʊ/ SY-oh) is a city in Linn County, Oregon, United States. Located east of Jefferson and south of Stayton, it sits along Oregon Route 226 near the confluence of the north and south forks of the Santiam River. Incorporated in 1866, the population was 956 at the 2020 census.

== History ==
Oregon Geographic Names suggests that Scio was named by one of the original residents, William McKinney, who, with Henry L. Turner, set up a flour mill at the new town. Turner suggested McKinney come up with a name for the place, and McKinney used the name of his former home, Scio, Ohio. The Ohio village is, in turn, named for a Greek island called Chios; the Italian version of the name is Scio.

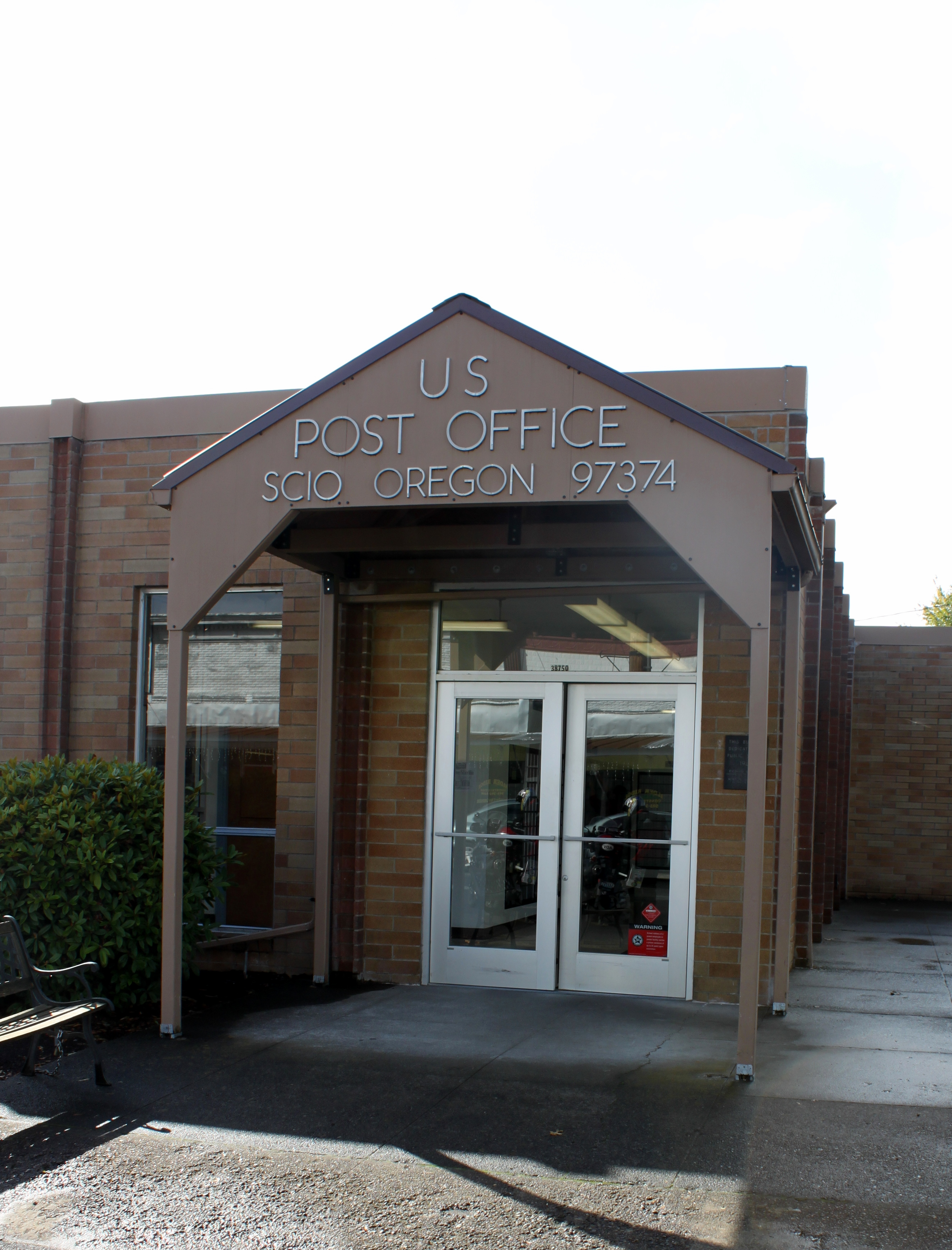
Post office in Scio in 2009

Thomas Creek, which flows through the city, was named for Frederick Thomas, who obtained a Donation Land Claim and settled on the banks of the creek in 1846. Scio post office, headed by postmaster Euphronius Wheeler, was established on October 3, 1860. The community was incorporated as a city on October 24, 1866.

Resident Lawrence William Moore shot 20 people, killing 5, at the Oregon Museum Tavern in nearby Salem on May 7, 1981. Moore was sentenced to life in prison after being convicted of four counts of murder. In September 2008, the Animal Liberation Front released 215 minks from the S&N Fur Farm, with 177 later captured by the ranch. A flood in January 2012 caused significant property damage in Scio and the surrounding area.

== Geography ==
According to the United States Census Bureau, the city has a total area of 0.38 square miles (0.98 km^{2}), all land. Scio lies at en elevation of 317 feet above sea level. It is located in the Albany–Corvallis–Lebanon combined statistical area, though its area code is 503 & 971, unlike most of the rest of Linn County.

=== Climate ===
This region experiences warm (but not hot) and dry summers, with no average monthly temperatures above 71.6 °F (22.0 °C). According to the Köppen Climate Classification system, Scio has a warm-summer Mediterranean climate, abbreviated "Csb" on climate maps.

== Demographics ==
Historical population
Census	Pop.	Note	%±
1870	400		—
1880	193		−51.7%
1890	253		31.1%
1900	346		36.8%
1910	295		−14.7%
1920	300		1.7%
1930	258		−14.0%
1940	351		36.0%
1950	448		27.6%
1960	441		−1.6%
1970	447		1.4%
1980	579		29.5%
1990	623		7.6%
2000	695		11.6%
2010	838		20.6%
2020	956		14.1%

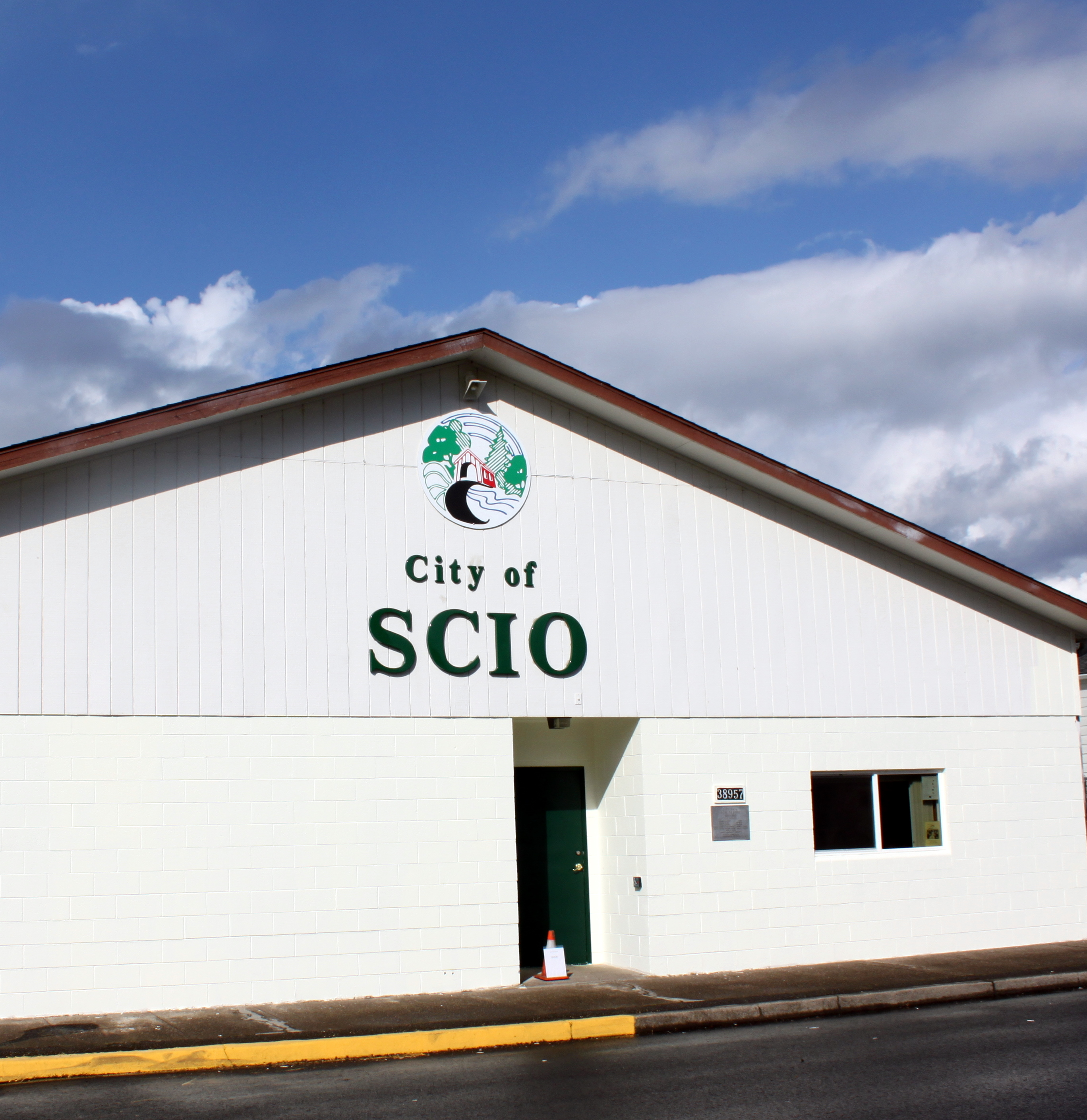
Scio library and city building

=== 2020 census ===
As of the 2020 census, Scio had a population of 956. The median age was 34.3 years. 26.2% of residents were under the age of 18 and 13.4% of residents were 65 years of age or older. For every 100 females there were 99.2 males, and for every 100 females age 18 and over there were 96.7 males age 18 and over.

0% of residents lived in urban areas, while 100.0% lived in rural areas.

There were 361 households in Scio, of which 38.5% had children under the age of 18 living in them. Of all households, 54.0% were married-couple households, 14.4% were households with a male householder and no spouse or partner present, and 22.7% were households with a female householder and no spouse or partner present. About 20.5% of all households were made up of individuals and 8.3% had someone living alone who was 65 years of age or older.

There were 370 housing units, of which 2.4% were vacant. Among occupied housing units, 67.9% were owner-occupied and 32.1% were renter-occupied. The homeowner vacancy rate was 1.6% and the rental vacancy rate was <0.1%.

Racial composition as of the 2020 census
Race	Number	Percent
White	848	88.7%
Black or African American	8	0.8%
American Indian and Alaska Native	7	0.7%
Asian	8	0.8%
Native Hawaiian and Other Pacific Islander	2	0.2%
Some other race	16	1.7%
Two or more races	67	7.0%
Hispanic or Latino (of any race)	38	4.0%

=== 2010 census ===
As of the census of 2010, there were 838 people, 306 households, and 225 families living in the city. The population density was 2,205.3 inhabitants per square mile (851.5/km^{2}). There were 324 housing units at an average density of 852.6 per square mile (329.2/km^{2}). The racial makeup of the city was 91.4% White, 0.4% African American, 1.8% Native American, 0.6% Asian, 0.1% Pacific Islander, 2.0% from other races, and 3.7% from two or more races. Hispanic or Latino of any race were 3.1% of the population.

There were 306 households, of which 35.9% had children under the age of 18 living with them, 52.3% were married couples living together, 14.7% had a female householder with no husband present, 6.5% had a male householder with no wife present, and 26.5% were non-families. 20.9% of all households were made up of individuals, and 7.6% had someone living alone who was 65 years of age or older. The average household size was 2.74 and the average family size was 3.18.

The median age in the city was 34.8 years. 27.1% of residents were under the age of 18; 7.7% were between the ages of 18 and 24; 26.5% were from 25 to 44; 24.8% were from 45 to 64; and 14% were 65 years of age or older. The gender makeup of the city was 49.8% male and 50.2% female.

=== 2000 census ===
As of the census of 2000, there were 695 people, 265 households, and 188 families living in the city. The population density was 2,202.6 inhabitants per square mile (850.4/km^{2}). There were 278 housing units at an average density of 881.0 per square mile (340.2/km^{2}). The racial makeup of the city was 93.24% White, 3.88% Native American, 0.43% Asian, 0.14% from other races, and 2.30% from two or more races. Hispanic or Latino of any race were 1.87% of the population.

There were 265 households, out of which 35.5% had children under the age of 18 living with them, 54.7% were married couples living together, 10.6% had a female householder with no husband present, and 28.7% were non-families. 24.9% of all households were made up of individuals, and 10.2% had someone living alone who was 65 years of age or older. The average household size was 2.61 and the average family size was 3.07.

In the city, the population was spread out, with 28.9% under the age of 18, 8.6% from 18 to 24, 24.6% from 25 to 44, 22.6% from 45 to 64, and 15.3% who were 65 years of age or older. The median age was 36 years. For every 100 females, there were 84.8 males. For every 100 females age 18 and over, there were 81.0 males.

The median income for a household in the city was $36,111, and the median income for a family was $38,906. Males had a median income of $31,726 versus $27,833 for females. The per capita income for the city was $16,222. About 7.7% of families and 10.9% of the population were below the poverty line, including 11.8% of those under age 18 and 29.9% of those age 65 or over.

== Government ==
The city is served by the Scio School District, which operates a single high school, Scio High School. Fire protection is via the Scio Fire District, which operates three stations in the greater Scio area. Law enforcement is through a contract with the Linn County Sheriff's Office.

== Points of interest ==
Scio refers to itself as the "Covered Bridge Capital of the West." There are five bridges as part of its Covered Bridge Tour out of a total of eight in Linn County. Most of those bridges are listed on the National Register of Historic Places (NRHP), including Weddle Bridge, Shimanek Bridge, Gilkey Bridge, and the Hannah Bridge. Scio is also home to the ZCBJ Hall, a lodge built on beside Thomas Creek in 1922 by the large Czechoslovak population then living in the area. Now owned by the Linn County Lamb and Wool Fair, the lodge is used for community events and rented out for private events such as weddings and is also listed on the NRHP. Other buildings in the area on the NRHP include the E. C. Peery Building, David and Maggie Aegerter Barn, and the Joseph Wesely House and Barn.

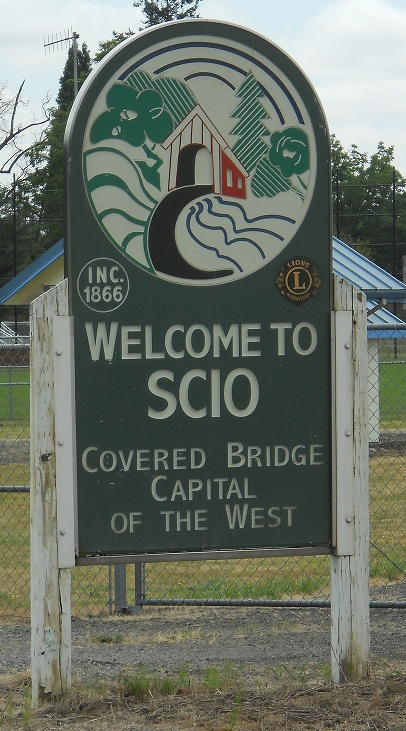
Welcome sign

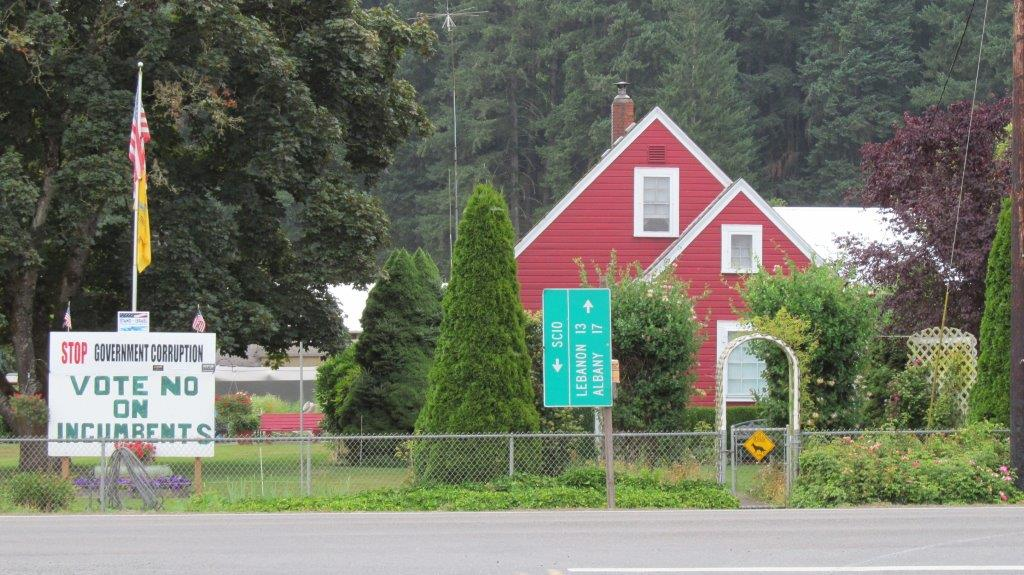
Southern entrance to Scio, Oregon, at Hwy 226 and Gilkey Rd.

== Notable people ==
- Doug Mikolas, professional football player
- Bernard A. Newcomb, co-founder of E*TRADE
- Samuel T. Richardson, attorney
