= Jordan, Oregon =

Unincorporated community in the state of Oregon, United States

- Unincorporated community
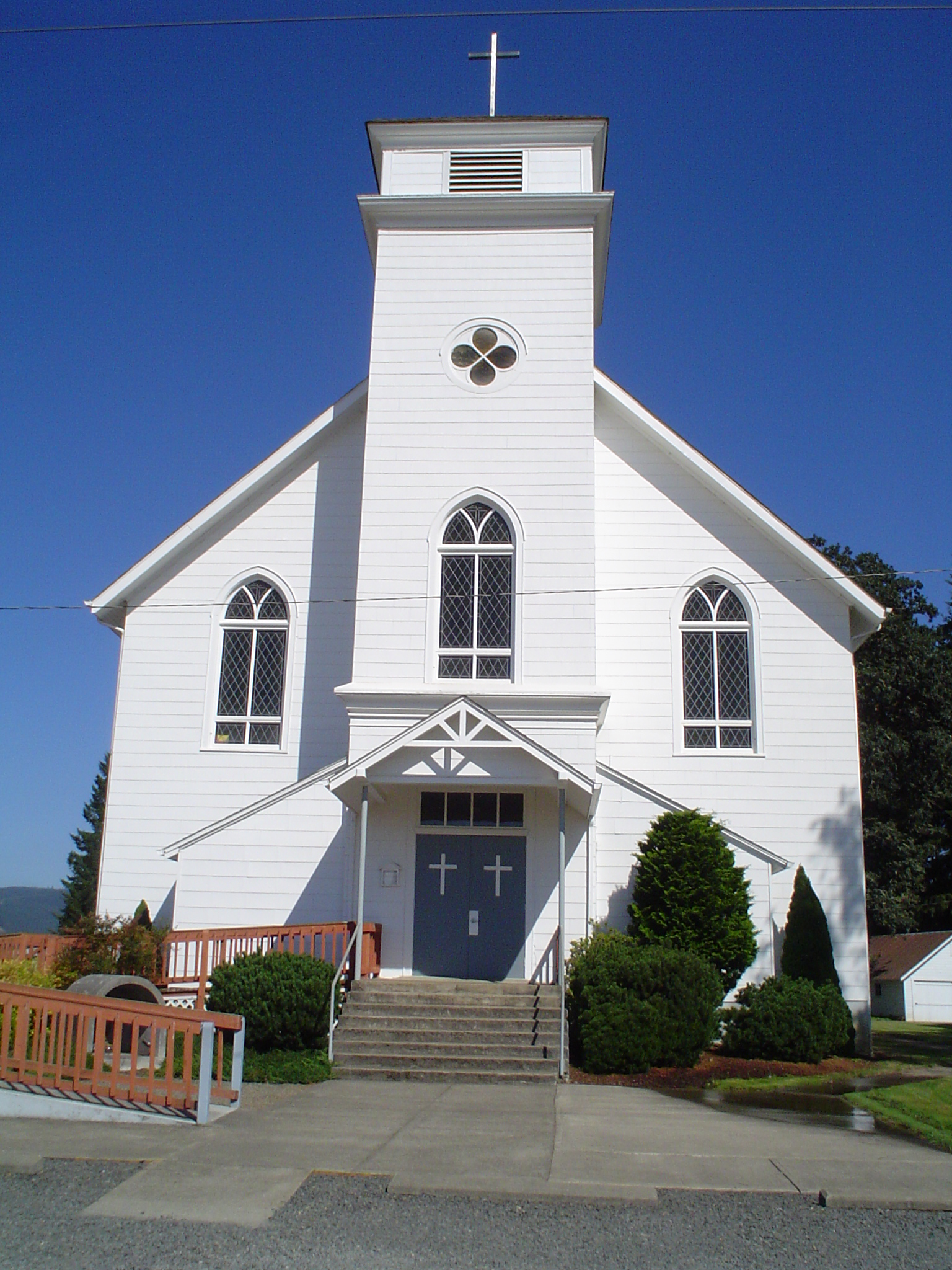
- Our Lady of Lourdes southeast of Jordan

- Location within Oregon Location within the United States
- Coordinates: 44°43′37″N 122°41′59″W
- Country: United States
- State: Oregon
- County: Linn
- Elevation: 545 ft (166 m)
- Time zone: UTC-8 (Pacific (PST))
  - Summer (DST): UTC-7 (PDT)
- ZIP code: 97374
- Area codes: 503 and 971
- GNIS feature ID: 1122517

Jordan is an unincorporated community in Linn County, in the U.S. state of Oregon. It lies along Oregon Route 226, southeast of Stayton and about halfway between Scio and Lyons.

Thomas Creek flows through Jordan. A covered bridge, the Jordan Bridge, built in 1937, was a 90-foot (27 m) Howe truss span that crossed the creek here. Dismantled in 1985, its timbers were moved to Stayton and reassembled in that city's Pioneer Park.

The community was once the site of the Monastery of Our Lady of Jordan.

The Echoes of Jordan: A History of Faith, Farming, and the Lourdes Public Charter School

Nestled in the foothills of northern Linn County along the banks of Thomas Creek, the unincorporated community of Jordan, Oregon, holds a history far larger than its geographic footprint. It is a story of German-Catholic pioneers, exiled French monks, industrial grit, and a fiercely independent rural community that refused to let its school die.

The Pioneer Roots and the Bender Family (Late 1800s)

In the late 19th century, the Willamette Valley attracted waves of industrious immigrants. Among them were German-Catholic families, notably the "Bender family" (led by pioneers like John Bender). The Benders and their contemporaries established a deeply rooted farming community.

To anchor their new home, they built the Jordan Flouring Mill along Thomas Creek, harnessing the water to process grain for the region’s growing populace. Recognizing the need to educate their children, the family established a tiny, one-room schoolhouse a few miles west of the main settlement in *1898. In honor of the family whose land and labor made it possible, it was named the Bender School.

Around this same time, the community donated land just east of the settlement for what is now the Bender Catholic Cemetery (also known as the Silbernagle or Jordan Cemetery), creating a permanent resting place for generations of the town's founding families.

The French Trappist Exile (1904–1911)

As the Bender School was finding its footing, a dramatic chapter of European history crossed the Atlantic to Jordan. In 1904, fleeing strict anti-clerical laws in France, a group of Trappist monks from the Abbey of Fontgombault sought refuge in Oregon. They established the Monastery of Our Lady of Jordan on 400 acres of local plateau land.

True to the Cistercian tradition of strict observance, contemplative silence, and manual labor, the monks built a steam sawmill and attempted to farm the rugged landscape. To accommodate their growing operations, they constructed an impressive, three-story wooden building.

However, the venture was short-lived. Severe language barriers, financial hardships, and a devastating sawmill fire forced the monastery to close by 1911. While the monks scattered, their massive three-story wooden landmark remained, later serving the community as the local Trappist School, a striking monument to a fleeting era of monastic grit.

The Move to Jordan and the Road to Secularization

In the early 1900s, the center of gravity for the local population shifted eastward toward the logging hubs and the newly built Our Lady of Lourdes Catholic Church. The community physically relocated the one-room Bender Schoolhouse to its current home on Jordan Road, officially renaming it the Lourdes School.

For decades, the boundaries between the public school and the local parish were blissfully blurred; Catholic nuns (the Sisters of St. Francis) taught the children, and religious education was part of the daily routine. However, the 1960s brought a major legal turning point via Oregon's "Gary Wall" case. The state courts ruled that tax dollars could not fund schools staffed by religious orders or teaching religious curricula. To preserve their public funding and keep their independent school district alive, the Jordan community made a definitive choice: they fully secularized the school, removing religious habits and catechism from the school day while proudly keeping the historic "Lourdes" name.

The Charter Struggle and Modern Legacy

The school’s ultimate test of survival arrived in 1997 when state consolidation laws forced the tiny Lourdes district to merge into the larger Scio School District. Citing budget constraints, the Scio School Board voted to close Lourdes in the spring of 1998.

The community’s response was immediate and fierce. Refusing to let a century of history vanish, parents sued the district, while teachers completely volunteered their time and community members donated private funds to keep the doors open for the 1998–99 school year. Recognizing the community's unbreakable resolve, Scio eventually relented, sponsoring the school's transition.

Today, operating as the Lourdes Public Charter School, the institution stands as a triumph of rural independence. Though it is strictly public and secular, and its 1960s-era buildings are leased, it sits on the exact ground where pioneer history was made. Just out the back doors, the historic Bender Cemetery serves as a quiet reminder of the hands that built the community, while a few miles down the road at Thomas Creek, the remnants of the "Broken Dam" mark where the old Bender mill once hummed, tying the past directly to the present.
