= Linn County, Oregon =

County in Oregon, United States

- County
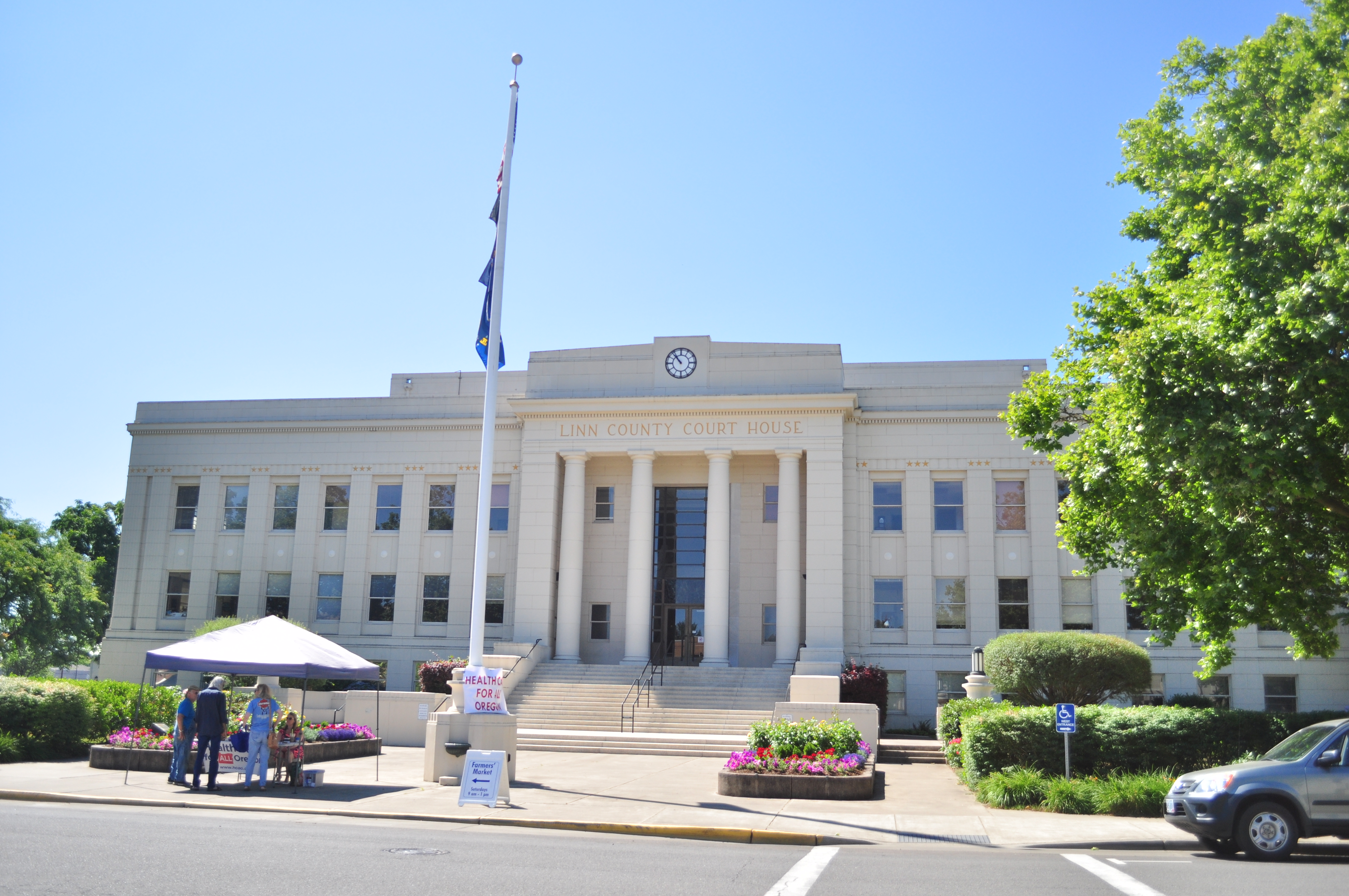
- Linn County Courthouse in Albany

- Flag Seal

- Location within the U.S. state of Oregon
- Coordinates: 44°38′N 123°05′W
- Country: United States
- State: Oregon
- Founded: December 28, 1847
- Named for: Lewis F. Linn
- Seat: Albany
- Largest city: Albany

Area
  - Total: 2,309 sq mi (5,980 km^{2})
  - Land: 2,290 sq mi (5,900 km^{2})
  - Water: 19 sq mi (49 km^{2}) 0.8%

Population (2020)
  - Total: 128,610
  - Estimate (2025): 132,843 ▲
  - Density: 56.2/sq mi (21.7/km^{2})
- Time zone: UTC−8 (Pacific)
  - Summer (DST): UTC−7 (PDT)
- Congressional districts: 4th, 5th
- Website: www.linncountyor.gov

Map of Linn County

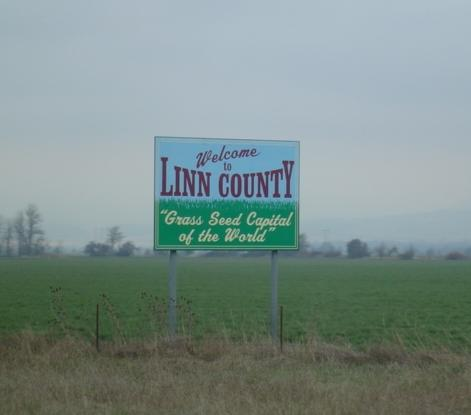
Sign welcoming visitors to the county

Linn County is one of the 36 counties in the U.S. state of Oregon. As of the 2023 census population estimates, the population was 131,496. The county seat is Albany. The county is named in the honor of Lewis F. Linn, a U.S. Senator from Missouri who advocated the American settlement of the Oregon Country. Linn County comprises the Albany, OR Metropolitan Statistical Area, which is included in the Portland-Vancouver-Salem, OR-WA Combined Statistical Area. It is located in the Willamette Valley. In 2010, the center of population of Oregon was located in Linn County, near the city of Lyons.

== History ==
On December 28, 1847, the Provisional Legislature created Linn County from the southern portion of Champoeg (later Marion) County. The boundaries were altered in 1851 and 1854 with the creation of Lane and Wasco Counties. The county seat was originally located in Calapooia (later known as Brownsville), but in 1851 the Territorial Legislature passed an act establishing Albany as the county seat. A special election in 1856 reaffirmed Albany as the county seat.

== Geography ==
According to the United States Census Bureau, the county has a total area of 2,309 square miles (5,980 km^{2}), of which 2,290 square miles (5,900 km^{2}) is land and 19 square miles (49 km^{2}) (0.8%) is water.

=== Adjacent counties ===
- Polk County (northwest)
- Marion County (north)
- Jefferson County (east)
- Deschutes County (southeast)
- Lane County (south)
- Benton County (west)

=== National protected area ===
- Willamette National Forest (part)

== Demographics ==
Historical population
Census	Pop.	Note	%±
1850	994		—
1860	6,772		581.3%
1870	8,717		28.7%
1880	12,676		45.4%
1890	16,265		28.3%
1900	18,603		14.4%
1910	22,662		21.8%
1920	24,550		8.3%
1930	24,700		0.6%
1940	30,485		23.4%
1950	54,317		78.2%
1960	58,867		8.4%
1970	71,914		22.2%
1980	89,465		24.4%
1990	91,227		2.0%
2000	103,069		13.0%
2010	116,672		13.2%
2020	128,610		10.2%
2025 (est.)	132,843	▲	3.3%
U.S. Decennial Census; 1790–1960 1900–1990; 1990–2000 2010–2020

=== 2020 census ===
Linn County, Oregon – Racial and ethnic composition Note: the US Census treats Hispanic/Latino as an ethnic category. This table excludes Latinos from the racial categories and assigns them to a separate category. Hispanics/Latinos may be of any race.
Race / Ethnicity (NH = Non-Hispanic)	Pop 1980	Pop 1990	Pop 2000	Pop 2010	Pop 2020	% 1980	% 1990	% 2000	% 2010	% 2020
White alone (NH)	86,284	87,081	94,012	101,579	104,118	96.41%	95.46%	91.21%	87.06%	80.96%
Black or African American alone (NH)	127	171	285	456	623	0.14%	0.19%	0.28%	0.39%	0.48%
Native American or Alaska Native alone (NH)	742	1,001	1,192	1,268	1,283	0.83%	1.10%	1.16%	1.09%	1.00%
Asian alone (NH)	474	765	789	1,078	1,434	0.53%	0.84%	0.77%	0.92%	1.11%
Native Hawaiian or Pacific Islander alone (NH)	x	x	125	150	280	x	x	0.12%	0.13%	0.22%
Other race alone (NH)	243	32	92	126	658	0.27%	0.04%	0.09%	0.11%	0.51%
Mixed race or Multiracial (NH)	x	x	2,060	2,888	7,643	x	x	2.00%	2.48%	5.94%
Hispanic or Latino (any race)	1,625	2,177	4,514	9,127	12,571	1.82%	2.39%	4.38%	7.82%	9.77%
Total	89,495	91,227	103,069	116,672	128,610	100.00%	100.00%	100.00%	100.00%	100.00%

=== American Community Survey 2025 data ===
The United States Census Bureau estimated that in 2025, Linn County’s population was 131.420. It was also estimated that the county's population was 80,00% Non-Hispanic White, 10,80% Hispanic or Latino, 1,10% Non-Hispanic Black, 1,30% Asian, 1,40% Native American, 0,40% Pacific Islander, and 5,00% Multiracial.

Total	Population	Percentage
Non-Hispanic White	105.136	80,00%
Hispanic or Latino	14.193	10,80%
Non-Hispanic Black	1.446	1,10%
Asian	1.708	1,30%
Native American	1.840	1,40%
Pacific Islander	526	0,40%
Non-Hispanic Multiracial	6.571	5,00%

As of the 2020 census, the county had a population of 128,610. Of the residents, 21.9% were under the age of 18 and 19.9% were 65 years of age or older; the median age was 40.4 years. For every 100 females there were 97.8 males, and for every 100 females age 18 and over there were 95.5 males. 65.8% of residents lived in urban areas and 34.2% lived in rural areas.

The racial makeup of the county was 83.7% White, 0.5% Black or African American, 1.3% American Indian and Alaska Native, 1.1% Asian, 0.2% Native Hawaiian and Pacific Islander, 3.7% from some other race, and 9.3% from two or more races. Hispanic or Latino residents of any race comprised 9.8% of the population.

There were 49,344 households in the county, of which 29.4% had children under the age of 18 living with them and 24.0% had a female householder with no spouse or partner present. About 24.3% of all households were made up of individuals and 11.9% had someone living alone who was 65 years of age or older.

There were 51,921 housing units, of which 5.0% were vacant. Among occupied housing units, 66.1% were owner-occupied and 33.9% were renter-occupied. The homeowner vacancy rate was 1.1% and the rental vacancy rate was 4.1%.

=== 2010 census ===
As of the 2010 census, there were 116,672 people, 45,204 households, and 30,976 families living in the county. The population density was 50.9 inhabitants per square mile (19.7/km^{2}). There were 48,821 housing units at an average density of 21.3 units per square mile (8.2 units/km^{2}). The racial makeup of the county was 90.6% white, 1.3% American Indian, 1.0% Asian, 0.5% black or African American, 0.1% Pacific islander, 3.3% from other races, and 3.3% from two or more races. Those of Hispanic or Latino origin made up 7.8% of the population. In terms of ancestry, 22.9% were German, 14.1% were English, 12.7% were Irish, and 7.1% were American.

Of the 45,204 households, 32.1% had children under age 18 living with them, 52.1% were married couples living together, 11.2% had a female householder with no husband present, 31.5% were non-families, and 24.4% of all households were made up of individuals. The average household size was 2.55 and the average family size was 3.01. The median age was 39.2 years.

The median income for a household in the county was $45,832 and the median income for a family was $55,320. Males had a median income of $44,450 versus $32,055 for females. The per capita income for the county was $22,165. About 11.0% of families and 15.6% of the population were below the poverty line, including 23.0% of those under age 18 and 7.8% of those age 65 or over.

=== 2000 census ===
As of the 2000 census, there were 103,069 people, 39,541 households, and 28,232 families living in the county. The population density was 45 people per square mile (17 people/km^{2}). There were 42,521 housing units at an average density of 19 units per square mile (7.3/km^{2}). The racial makeup of the county was 93.20% White, 0.32% Black or African American, 1.27% Native American, 0.78% Asian, 0.15% Pacific Islander, 1.80% from other races, and 2.49% from two or more races. 4.38% of the population were Hispanic or Latino of any race. 22.2% were of German, 13.0% American, 11.2% English and 8.6% Irish ancestry.

There were 39,541 households, out of which 32.00% had children under the age of 18 living with them, 56.90% were married couples living together, 10.00% had a female householder with no husband present, and 28.60% were non-families. 23.00% of all households were made up of individuals, and 10.10% had someone living alone who was 65 years of age or older. The average household size was 2.58 and the average family size was 3.01.

In the county, the population was spread out, with 26.00% under the age of 18, 8.40% from 18 to 24, 27.00% from 25 to 44, 24.10% from 45 to 64, and 14.50% who were 65 years of age or older. The median age was 37 years. For every 100 females there were 97.50 males. For every 100 females age 18 and over, there were 95.00 males.

The median income for a household in the county was $37,518, and the median income for a family was $44,188. Males had a median income of $35,586 versus $24,073 for females. The per capita income for the county was $17,633. About 8.90% of families and 11.40% of the population were below the poverty line, including 14.80% of those under age 18 and 7.10% of those age 65 or over.

== Economy ==
Principal industries are wood products, agriculture, mining, and manufacturing. Linn County's economy relies heavily on the lumber and wood products industry; in 1990, this industry accounted for 40% of the county's manufacturing jobs. The climate and soil conditions provide one of Oregon's most diversified agriculture areas, allowing a wide variety of specialty crops such as common and perennial ryegrass. Linn County is also home to the only emery mine in the United States, and the production of manufactured and motor homes.

== Natural history ==
A variety of flora and fauna occur in Linn County. Fauna include mammals, birds, amphibians and reptiles. Trees include a variety of oaks and conifers as well as other species such as Salix sessilifolia. The Rough-skinned Newt is a common amphibian occurring in the oak woodlands of the county.

Carpenter Mountain, one of the highest points in the western Cascades is located in Linn County, although road access to the peak is only possible through Lane County.

== Government and politics ==
Linn County has only supported a Democrat for president four times since 1920, and only twice since 1940. Jimmy Carter is the last Democrat to carry the county, in 1976. In 2012 Mitt Romney won 56.28 percent to incumbent president Obama's 39.63 percent, and Obama's 2008 result of 42.64 percent is the best by a Democrat since Michael Dukakis in a 1988 election affected by a major drought.

In January 2013, Linn County Sheriff Tim Mueller gained national attention for a letter he sent to then Vice-president Joe Biden, informing Biden that he [Mueller] would not enforce any federal firearms laws he considered to be "offending the constitutional rights of my citizens." He further stated that he would not permit federal officers to come to his county to enforce such laws.

United States presidential election results for Linn County, Oregon
Year	Republican		Democratic		Third party(ies)	
Year	No.	%	No.	%	No.	%
1880	1,416	45.43%	1,677	53.80%	24	0.77%
1884	1,444	45.60%	1,641	51.82%	82	2.59%
1888	1,603	47.51%	1,633	48.40%	138	4.09%
1892	1,689	39.38%	630	14.69%	1,970	45.93%
1896	2,064	42.06%	2,736	55.76%	107	2.18%
1900	1,927	45.10%	1,997	46.74%	349	8.17%
1904	2,346	54.36%	1,206	27.94%	764	17.70%
1908	2,202	48.87%	1,813	40.24%	491	10.90%
1912	1,301	24.20%	2,134	39.69%	1,941	36.10%
1916	4,524	46.26%	4,675	47.81%	580	5.93%
1920	4,693	56.17%	3,177	38.03%	485	5.80%
1924	4,141	49.56%	2,618	31.33%	1,596	19.10%
1928	5,877	67.62%	2,645	30.43%	169	1.94%
1932	4,106	40.93%	5,366	53.49%	559	5.57%
1936	4,110	36.66%	5,856	52.23%	1,245	11.11%
1940	6,523	50.34%	6,360	49.08%	76	0.59%
1944	6,877	50.97%	6,480	48.02%	136	1.01%
1948	7,936	50.37%	7,260	46.08%	559	3.55%
1952	13,761	62.67%	8,058	36.70%	140	0.64%
1956	12,469	55.12%	10,153	44.88%	0	0.00%
1960	12,899	53.89%	11,035	46.11%	0	0.00%
1964	8,382	35.96%	14,926	64.04%	0	0.00%
1968	12,604	51.90%	10,032	41.31%	1,648	6.79%
1972	15,079	54.21%	11,178	40.19%	1,557	5.60%
1976	14,128	45.22%	15,776	50.50%	1,337	4.28%
1980	18,943	52.19%	13,516	37.24%	3,834	10.56%
1984	23,463	59.10%	16,161	40.71%	75	0.19%
1988	18,312	50.69%	17,007	47.08%	803	2.22%
1992	16,461	36.35%	15,399	34.00%	13,427	29.65%
1996	18,331	44.36%	17,041	41.24%	5,953	14.41%
2000	25,359	57.13%	16,682	37.58%	2,347	5.29%
2004	31,260	60.07%	19,940	38.32%	841	1.62%
2008	28,071	54.00%	22,163	42.64%	1,748	3.36%
2012	28,944	56.28%	20,378	39.63%	2,104	4.09%
2016	33,488	57.03%	17,995	30.65%	7,236	12.32%
2020	43,486	59.87%	26,512	36.50%	2,642	3.64%
2024	43,078	60.31%	25,749	36.05%	2,602	3.64%

== Communities ==
=== Cities ===
- Albany (county seat) (part)
- Brownsville
- Gates (part)
- Halsey
- Harrisburg
- Idanha (part)
- Lebanon
- Lyons
- Mill City (part)
- Millersburg
- Scio
- Sodaville
- Sweet Home
- Tangent
- Waterloo

=== Census-designated places ===
- Cascadia
- Crabtree
- Crawfordsville
- Holley
- Lacomb
- Peoria
- Shedd
- South Lebanon
- West Scio

=== Unincorporated communities ===
- Berlin
- Calapooia
- Cascadia
- Crabtree
- Crawfordsville
- Foster
- Fox Valley
- Holley
- Jordan
- Kingston
- Lacomb
- Marion Forks
- Peoria
- Riverside
- Santiam Junction
- Shedd
- Shelburn
- West Scio

=== Former communities ===
- Burlington
- Orleans
- Rowland
- Syracuse
- Tallman
- Thomas

== Education ==
School districts covering sections of the county include:

- Central Linn School District 552
- Corvallis School District 509J
- Eugene School District 4J
- Greater Albany School District 8J
- Harrisburg School District 7J
- Jefferson School District 14J
- Lebanon Community School District 9
- North Santiam School District 29J
- Santiam Canyon School District 129J
- Scio School District 95
- Sweet Home School District 55

Most of the county is in the Linn-Benton Community College district. A piece in the southwest is in the Lane Community College district, and a piece to the northeast is in the Chemeketa Community College district.

== See also ==
- National Register of Historic Places listings in Linn County, Oregon
- USS Linn County (LST-900)
