= Thomas Creek =

Thomas Creek may refer to:

- Thomas E. Creek (1950–1969), United States Marine posthumously awarded the Medal of Honor for actions in Vietnam
- Thomas Creek (North Fork Salt River tributary), a stream in Shelby County, Missouri
- Thomas Creek (Oregon), a list of places in Oregon with Thomas Creek in their names, including;
  - Thomas Creek (Linn County, Oregon), a stream
  - Thomas Creek Bridge, a bridge over Thomas Creek in Curry County, Oregon
- Thomas Creek, a creek in Santa Rosa County, Florida, site of Thomas Creek Archeological District
- Tom Creek, a creek located in the Omineca Country region of British Columbia

== See also ==
- Thomas Branch (disambiguation)
- Thomas Cheek (disambiguation)
- Thomas Creeks
