= List of bridges on the National Register of Historic Places in Oregon =

This is a list of bridges and tunnels on the National Register of Historic Places in the U.S. state of Oregon. It includes a number of viaducts which are considered bridges. A list of bridges, tunnels, and viaducts of the Historic Columbia River Highway is included.

Gray shading indicates that a structure has been removed from the Register. Often the road listed in the "location" column now parallels the bridge on a new one, and the old bridge is closed to traffic.

== Bridges and tunnels besides in Historic Columbia River Highway ==
Name	Image	Built	Listed	Location	County	Type
Antelope Creek Bridge		1922	1979-11-29 removed 1988-04-18 but re-added in 2012	Main Street over Little Butte Creek, Eagle Point; 42°28′19″N 122°48′00″W (moved from Antelope Creek, a nearby tributary of Little Butte Creek)	Jackson	Covered modified queenpost truss
Belknap Bridge		1966	1979-11-29	McKenzie River, Rainbow; 44°10′05″N 122°13′41″W	Lane	Covered Howe truss
Balch Gulch Bridge		1905	2025-09-23	Portland; 45°32′08″N 122°42′45″W	Multnomah	Pratt deck truss
Big Creek Bridge No. 01180		1931	2005-08-05	US 101 over Big Creek, north of Florence; 44°10′26″N 124°06′54″W	Lane	Bowstring arch
Broadway Bridge		1913	2012-11-14	Willamette R. at RM 11.7, Portland; 45°31′55″N 122°40′26″W	Multnomah	Willamette River Highway Bridges of Portland, Oregon MPS
Burnside Bridge		1926	2012-11-14	Willamette R. at RM 12.7, Portland; 45°31′23″N 122°40′03″W	Multnomah	Willamette River Highway Bridges of Portland, Oregon MPS
Cape Creek Bridge No. 01113		1932	2005-08-05	US 101 over Cape Creek, north of Florence; 44°07′59″N 124°07′19″W	Lane	Arch
Chambers Bridge	Chambers Bridge	1936	1979-11-29	Tyler Avenue over Coast Fork Willamette River, Cottage Grove; 43°47′20″N 123°04′12″W	Lane	Covered Howe truss
Chitwood Bridge	Chitwood Bridge	ca. 1930	1979-11-29	Chitwood Road over Yaquina River, Chitwood; 44°39′14″N 123°49′05″W	Lincoln	Covered Howe truss
Coos Bay Bridge No. 01823		1936	2005-08-05	US 101 over Coos Bay, North Bend; 43°25′34″N 124°13′19″W	Coos	Cantilever
Coyote Creek Bridge		1922	1979-11-29	Coyote Creek Road over Coyote Creek, south of Crow; 43°58′12″N 123°19′08″W	Lane	Covered Howe truss
Crawfordsville Bridge	Crawfordsville Bridge	1932	1979-11-29	OR 228 over Calapooia River, Crawfordsville; 44°21′29″N 122°51′36″W	Linn	Covered Howe truss
Currin Bridge		1925	1979-11-29	Layng Road over Row River, east of Cottage Grove; 43°47′35″N 122°59′46″W	Lane	Covered Howe truss
Deadwood Creek Bridge	Deadwood Creek Bridge	1932	1979-11-29	Deadwood Loop over Deadwood Creek, north of Deadwood; 44°08′38″N 123°43′12″W	Lane	Covered Howe truss
Depoe Bay Bridge No. 01388	Depoe Bay Bridge	1927	2005-08-05	US 101 over Depoe Bay, Depoe Bay; 44°48′36″N 124°03′43″W	Lincoln	Arch
Dorena Bridge		1949	1979-11-29	Shoreview Drive over Row River, north of Dorena; 43°44′13″N 122°53′02″W	Lane	Covered Howe truss
Earnest Bridge		1938	1979-11-29	Paschelke Road over Mohawk River, north of Marcola; 44°12′04″N 122°50′10″W	Lane	Covered Howe truss
Fisher School Bridge		1925	1979-11-29	East Crab Creek Road over Five Rivers, Fisher; 44°17′31″N 123°50′28″W	Lincoln	Covered Howe truss
Gallon House Bridge		1916	1979-11-29	Gallon House Road over Abiqua Creek, northwest of Silverton; 45°01′55″N 122°47′53″W	Marion	Covered Howe truss
Goodpasture Bridge		1938	1979-11-29	Goodpasture Road over McKenzie River, west of Vida; 44°08′53″N 122°35′17″W	Lane	Covered Howe truss
Grave Creek Bridge	Grave Creek Bridge	1920	1979-11-29	Sunny Valley Loop over Grave Creek, Sunny Valley; 42°38′10″N 123°22′41″W	Josephine	Covered Howe truss
Hannah Bridge		1936	1979-11-29	Camp Morrison Drive over Thomas Creek, east of Scio; 44°42′43″N 122°43′08″W	Linn	Covered Howe truss
Harris Bridge		1936	1979-11-29	Harris Road over Marys River, Harris; 44°34′48″N 123°27′36″W	Benton	Covered Howe truss
Hawthorne Bridge		1910	2012-11-14	Willamette R. at RM 13.1, Portland; 45°30′48″N 122°40′15″W	Multnomah	Willamette River Highway Bridges of Portland, Oregon MPS
Hayden Bridge		1918	1979-11-29	Hayden Road over Alsea River, west of Alsea; 44°22′59″N 123°37′52″W	Benton	Covered Howe truss
Hoffman Bridge		1936	1987-02-17	Hungry Hill Road over Crabtree Creek, north of Crabtree; 44°39′11″N 122°53′24″W	Linn	Covered Howe truss
Irish Bend Bridge		1954	2013-03-27	Campus Way over Oak Creek, Corvallis; 44°34′01″N 123°18′04″W (moved from Irish Bend Road northeast of Monroe)	Benton	Covered Howe truss
Lake Creek Bridge	Lake Creek Bridge	1928	1979-11-29	Chickahominy Road over Lake Creek, south of Greenleaf; 44°06′14″N 123°40′26″W	Lane	Covered Howe truss
Larwood Bridge	Larwood Bridge	1939	1979-11-29	Fish Hatchery Drive over Crabtree Creek, Larwood; 44°37′48″N 122°44′28″W	Linn	Covered Howe truss
Longview Bridge		1929, 1930	1982-07-16	Columbia River, Rainier; 46°06′18″N 122°57′43″W	Columbia	Cantilever bridge
Lost Creek Bridge		1919	1979-11-29	Lost Creek Road over Lost Creek, southeast of Lake Creek; 42°22′48″N 122°34′48″W	Jackson	Covered modified queenpost truss
Lowell Bridge	Lowell Bridge	1945, 1947, 1953	1979-11-29	Pioneer Street over Dexter Lake, south of Lowell; 43°54′32″N 122°46′44″W	Lane	Covered Howe truss
McKee Bridge		1917	1979-11-29	McKee Branch Road over Applegate River, south of Ruch; 42°07′34″N 123°04′23″W	Jackson	Covered Howe truss
Mill City Southern Pacific Rail Road Bridge		1888	2021-06-22	Mill City; 44°45′19″N 122°28′40″W	Linn, Marion	Pratt through truss
Milo Academy Bridge		1962	1979-11-29	Milo Drive over South Umpqua River, Milo; 42°56′06″N 123°02′20″W	Douglas	Covered
Morrison Bridge		1958	2012-11-14	Willamette R. at RM 12.8, Portland; 45°30′48″N 122°40′15″W	Multnomah	Willamette River Highway Bridges of Portland, Oregon MPS
Mosby Creek Bridge		1920	1979-11-29	Layng Road over Mosby Creek, east of Cottage Grove; 43°46′41″N 123°00′18″W	Lane	Covered Howe truss
North Fork of the Yachats Bridge		1938	1979-11-29	North Yachats River Road over North Fork Yachats River, east of Yachats; 44°18′36″N 123°58′12″W	Lincoln	Covered queenpost truss
Office Bridge		1944	1979-11-29	Westoak Road over North Fork Middle Fork Willamette River, Westfir; 43°45′29″N 122°29′46″W	Lane	Covered Howe truss
Oregon Railway and Navigation Company Bridge		1887, 1907	1980-03-13	McKenzie River south of Coburg; 44°06′47″N 123°02′49″W	Lane	Pratt through truss
Parvin Bridge	Parvin Bridge	1921	1979-11-29	Parvin Road over Lost Creek, south of Dexter; 43°53′56″N 122°49′23″W	Lane	Covered Howe truss
Pass Creek Covered Bridge		1925	2026-10-14	Drain; 43°39′38.8″N 123°18′59.5″W	Douglas	Covered Howe truss
Pengra Bridge	Pengra Bridge	1938	1979-11-29	Place Road over Fall Creek, southeast of Jasper; 43°57′58″N 122°50′42″W	Lane	Covered Howe truss
Portland and Southwestern Railroad Tunnel		1910, 1920, 1921	1981-08-17	Proposed Crown Zellerbach Trail, west of Chapman; 45°49′59″N 123°02′49″W	Columbia	
Portland–Vancouver Highway Bridge (Interstate Bridge)		1915–1917	1982-07-16	I-5 over Columbia River, north of Portland; 45°37′12″N 122°40′26″W	Multnomah	Steel truss with vertical-lift section
Ritner Creek Bridge		1927, 1976	1979-11-29	OR 223 over Ritner Creek, Ritner; 44°43′41″N 123°26′31″W	Polk	Covered Howe truss
Rock O' the Range Bridge		1963	1979-11-29	Bowery Lane over Swalley Canal, north of Bend; 44°07′19″N 121°17′13″W	Deschutes	Covered king post truss
Rocky Creek Bridge No. 01089		1927	2005-08-05	Otter Crest Loop Road (old US 101) over Rocky Creek, south of Depoe Bay; 44°46′41″N 124°04′19″W	Lincoln	
Rogue River Bridge No. 01172		1932	2005-08-05	US 101 over Rogue River, Gold Beach; 42°25′37″N 124°24′47″W	Curry	
Sandy Creek Bridge	Sandy Creek Bridge	1921	1979-11-29	OR 42 over Sandy Creek, Remote; 43°00′22″N 123°53′31″W	Coos	Covered Howe truss
Short Bridge	Short Bridge	1945	1979-11-29	High Deck Road over Santiam River, west of Cascadia; 44°23′31″N 122°30′36″W	Linn	Covered Howe truss
Siuslaw River Bridge No. 01821		1936	2005-08-05	US 101 over Siuslaw River, Florence; 43°57′54″N 124°06′32″W	Lane	Bascule
Stewart Bridge	Stewart Bridge	1930	1979-11-29	Garoutte Road over Mosby Creek, southeast of Walden; 43°45′58″N 122°59′38″W	Lane	Covered Howe truss
Stone Bridge and the Oregon Central Military Wagon Road	Stone Bridge	1867, 1872	1974-11-08	Warner Valley, southeast of Plush; 42°21′18″N 119°50′28″W	Lake	Primitive causeway
Ten Mile Creek Bridge No. 01181	Ten Mile Creek Bridge	1931	2005-08-05	US 101 over Tenmile Creek, south of Yachats; 44°13′26″N 124°06′36″W	Lane	Tied arch
Thomas Creek-Gilkey Covered Bridge		1939	1987-02-19	Goar Road over Thomas Creek, north of Crabtree; 44°41′17″N 122°54′11″W	Linn	Covered Howe truss
Thomas Creek-Shimanek Covered Bridge		1966	1987-02-19	Richardson Gap Road over Thomas Creek, northeast of Scio; 44°42′58″N 122°48′14″W	Linn	Covered Howe truss
Umpqua River Bridge No. 01822		1936	2005-08-05	US 101 over Umpqua River, Reedsport; 43°42′36″N 124°06′04″W	Douglas	
Union Street Railroad Bridge and Trestle		1913	2006-01-11	Willamette River, Salem; 44°56′49″N 123°02′31″W	Marion	Pratt through truss
Unity Bridge	Unity Bridge	1936, 1975	1979-11-29	Unity–Lowell Road over Fall Creek, Unity; 43°56′42″N 122°46′30″W	Lane	Covered Howe truss
Vista Avenue Viaduct		1926	1984-04-26	Vista Avenue over Canyon Road, Portland; 45°31′08″N 122°41′53″W	Multnomah	
Wendling Bridge		1938	1979-11-29	Wendling Road over Mill Creek, Wendling; 44°11′28″N 122°47′56″W	Lane	Covered Howe truss
Wildcat Creek Bridge	Wild Cat Bridge	1925	1979-11-29	Richardson Upriver Road over Wildcat Creek, Walton; 44°00′11″N 123°39′18″W	Lane	Covered Howe truss
Willamette River (Oregon City) Bridge (No. 357)		1922	2005-07-01	OR 43 over Willamette River, Oregon City; 45°21′32″N 122°36′36″W	Clackamas	Through arch
Wilson River Bridge No. 01499		1931	2005-08-05	US 101 over Wilson River, north of Tillamook; 45°28′41″N 123°50′42″W	Tillamook	
Yaquina Bay Bridge No. 01820		1936	2005-08-05	US 101 over Yaquina Bay, Newport; 44°37′23″N 124°03′25″W	Lincoln	
Columbia River Highway Historic District		1912–1921, 1937	1983-12-12	Troutdale to The Dalles	Multnomah, Hood River, Wasco	Multiple bridges and tunnels: see #Historic Columbia River Highway bridges and tunnels
Brumbaugh Bridge		1948, 1950	1979-11-29 removed 1986-11-25	Mosby Creek, southeast of Walden (destroyed)	Lane	Covered Howe truss
Drift Creek Bridge	Drift Creek Bridge	1914	1979-11-29 removed 1998-07-21	Rogers Lane over Bear Creek, southeast of Otis; 44°59′35″N 123°53′10″W (moved from Drift Creek Road over Drift Creek, southeast of Lincoln City)	Lincoln	Covered Howe truss
Elk City Bridge		1922	1979-11-29 removed 1986-11-25	Yaquina River, Elk City (destroyed)	Lincoln	Covered Howe truss
Horse Creek Bridge	Horse Creek Bridge	1930	1979-11-29 removed 1988-06-27	Myrtle Creek, Myrtle Creek; 43°01′23″N 123°17′24″W (moved from Horse Creek Road over Horse Creek, south of McKenzie Bridge)	Lane	Covered Howe truss
Pumping Station Bridge		1916	1979-11-29 removed 1987-05-18	Rickreall Creek, southwest of Ellendale (destroyed)	Polk	Covered
Roaring Camp Bridge		1929	1979-11-29 removed 1996-01-17	Roaring Camp Lane over Elk Creek, west of Drain; 43°39′50″N 123°26′24″W (destroyed)	Douglas	Covered Howe truss
Sam's Creek Bridge		1922	1979-11-29 removed 1986-11-25	Sams Creek Road over Siletz River, east of Siletz; 44°43′59″N 123°50′35″W (destroyed)	Lincoln	Covered Howe truss
Weddle Bridge		1937	1979-11-29 removed 1989-01-11	Ames Creek in Sweet Home; 44°23′42″N 122°43′37″W (moved from Kelly Road over Thomas Creek southeast of Jefferson)	Linn	Covered Howe truss
Wimer Bridge		1927, 1962	1979-11-29 removed 2006-04-18	Covered Bridge Road over Evans Creek, Wimer; 42°32′17″N 123°09′00″W (destroyed and rebuilt)	Jackson	Covered queenpost truss

== Historic Columbia River Highway bridges and tunnels ==
These are contributing structures in the Historic Columbia River Highway, which was listed on the National Register of Historic Places in 1983, and was further designated a National Historic Landmark District in 2000.

Bridge or tunnel mileage	Image	Location	Notes
Sandy River Bridge		45.53845°N 122.37664°W, spans Sandy River in Troutdale	Apparently a two-span truss bridge,
Stark Street Bridge		45.51533°N 122.36137°W, brings Start Street across Sandy River in Troutdale	Pratt Truss bridge with a 200 feet (61 m) mainspan, opened in 1915. Upstream from other Sandy River bridge.
Crown Point Viaduct		45.53994°N 122.24423°W, at Crown Point	Viaduct consisting of a sidewalk and retaining wall around tightly looped roadway (on ground, not elevated) around Vista House at Crown Point. The curve has a 110-foot radius, within specifications for HCRH roadways.
Latourell Creek Bridge	Another open spandrel concrete arch bridge, in woods, spanning a creek	45.53868°N 122.21888°W spans Latourell Creek below Latourell Falls	
Shepperd's Dell Bridge		45.54659°N 122.19780°W	A single-span 100 feet (30 m) open spandrel reinforced-concrete ribbed deck arch. Its two sidewalks have "spindle-and-cap railings."
Bridal Veil Falls Bridge		45.55420°N 122.18026°W	Built in 1914, "This bridge is a skewed 100-foot reinforced-concrete deck girder span in which the solid railings serve as continuous beams. The transverse deck support members function as deck girders. Width out-to-out is 23'-2", curb-to-curb is 21 feet. The unique design allowed the bridge to span both the falls and a nearby lumber company's log flumes."
"Cattle pass"		Near Bridal Veil Falls.	This cattle creep consists of a single 8-foot reinforced-concrete deck slab span. "A local landowner required construction of this Cattle Pass so that his herd could migrate to both sides of a pasture bisected by the highway's construction."
Wahkeena Creek Bridge (and/or Wahkeena Falls Bridge?)		45.57540°N 122.12830°W crosses below Wahkeena Falls.	Built in 1914, it is a reinforced concrete simple slab span, 18 feet (5.5 m) long.
West Multnomah Falls Viaduct		45.57710°N 122.12135°W	"This 400-foot viaduct consists of twenty 20-foot reinforced-concrete slab spans. Two parallel rows of 16-foot square columns, 17'-6" apart, support the deck. Roadway width is about 18 feet. The structure was designed to ride along the hillside above the railroad mainline because of tight right-of-way clearances. A concrete retaining wall runs along its south elevation. The arched railings were constructed of plaster concrete and metal lath. They represent a member of the family of bridge railing designs found on the CRH." Can be viewed from east-bound Interstate 84, over Benson Lake.
Multnomah Creek Bridge		45.57781°N 122.11708°W	A 67 feet (20 m) five-ribbed spandrel bridge.
East Multnomah Falls Viaduct		45.57920°N 122.11153°W	Built in 1914, "This 860-foot viaduct originally consisted of forty-three 20-foot reinforced-concrete slab spans. The deck was supported by two parallel rows of 16-foot-square columns, 17'-6" apart. Roadway width is about 18 feet. To provide greater stability to the structure, the Oregon State Highway Department, in 1922, added sets of intermediate posts and transverse walls at the midpoint of each span. Like the West Multnomah Falls Viaduct, this structure rises up the hillside because of tight right-of-way clearances with the nearby railroad mainline, and has a concrete retaining wall running along its south elevation. The arched railings were constructed of plaster concrete and metal lath. They represent a member of the family of bridge railing designs found on the CRH." Adjacent to, and can be seen from, Interstate 84, which built out into the Columbia River.
Oneonta Gorge Creek Bridge		45.58959°N 122.07541°W	Note another newer bridge there appears historic too? File:Oneonta Creek Bridge 7108 - HCRH Oregon.jpg
Oneonta Tunnel		45.58964°N 122.07471°W	Tunnel through cliff, where modern road swings outside cliff. Open for pedestrians only.
Horsetail Falls Bridge		45.59025°N 122.06923°W	Built in 1914, this is a "three-span 60-foot reinforced-concrete deck girder trestle [which] is 24 feet wide and has a roadway measuring 22 feet. The curb and guardrail form an integral unit, cantilevered out from the girder. The delicate arched railing panels were constructed from plaster concrete and metal lath. They are identical to those found on the Oneonta Gorge Creek Bridge (1914) and the Multnomah Falls viaducts and represent one of the family of railing designs found on the CRH."
McCord Creek Bridge		45.61477°N 121.99716°W	Not mentioned in NHL doc. Has this been replaced? Seems like it is neither of two current twin spans of Interstate 84. A small bridge brings the historic trail over McCord Creek.
Moffett Creek Bridge	Part of bridge from creek level below	45.62358°N 121.97755°W	Currently carries the southbound lanes of Interstate 84 over Moffett Creek including or near Hamilton Island Reach
Tanner Creek Bridge		45.63134°N 121.95466°W	60 feet (18 m) girder bridge Perhaps not a contributing structure of HCRH? Mentioned but not described in NHL doc.
Toothrock Viaduct		45.63831°N 121.9369°W	Built 1915 and partially reconstructed in 1996. Appears to wind around Tooth Rock, above where later-built Toothrock Tunnel comes through.
Toothrock Tunnel		45.63823°N 121.93596°W	Built in 1937, "this two-lane 827-foot tunnel was bored through Tooth Rock as part of the Bonneville Dam construction project. It originally provided a 26-foot roadway and 4-foot sidewalks. Maximum clearance was 20 feet." Now carries eastbound Interstate 84.
Eagle Creek Viaduct			
Eagle Creek Bridge	Low arched bridge reflected on river amongst trees	45.64108°N 121.92822°W, spanning Eagle Creek, bypassed by modern bridges of Interstate 84.	Closed spandrel single-span arch bridge.
Ruckel Creek Bridge			Remains of a bridge.
Herman Creek Bridge			
Gorton Creek Bridge		45.69027°N 121.77265°W, brings Wyeth Rd. across Gorton Creek	Not mentioned in NHL nomination. Perhaps cover in Wyeth State Park (currently a redlink) which maybe oughta redirect to Wyeth, Oregon article, to which Wyeth State Recreation Area redirects. In Google satellite view, looks possibly in Wyeth State Park, and near Wyeth Trailhead.
Lindsey Creek Bridge		45.68754°N 121.71457°W	Not mentioned in NHL doc.
Warren Creek Bridge		45.68642°N 121.70519°W	Not mentioned in NHL document. Is the photographed bridge a 2016 replica of the original bridge, perhaps?
Viento Creek Bridge			
Mitchell Point Viaduct			Part of combo with Mitchell Point Tunnel inspired by Axenstrasse in Switzerland. Since this was removed in 1966, it was not ever NRHP-listed. Is this (just) the elevated approach to the tunnel, shown in photograph labelled that way? Since this was removed in 1966, it was not ever NRHP-listed.
Mitchell Point Tunnel			Part of combo with Mitchell Point Viaduct inspired by Axenstrasse in Switzerland. Had windows like Axelstrasse does. Since this was removed in 1966, it was not ever NRHP-listed.
Hood River Bridge		45.70796°N 121.50562°W, spanned the Hood River	The most expensive bridge on the Historic Columbia River Highway. A 420 feet (130 m) "three-span reinforced-concrete parabolic ribbed deck arch" bridge completed in 1918. It was dismantled in 1982 and replaced by a modern bridge. Its removal sparked historic preservation of other parts of the HCRH.
Rock Slide Viaduct		<slide>45.69520°N 121.46193°W</slide>	34 feet (10 m) reinforced-concrete viaduct built in 1924. It a masonry guard wall only on its north side.
Mosier Twin Tunnels		45.68505°N 121.42102°W	Two tunnels in quick sequence, built originally in 1920. Drilled out of a basalt outcropping with an 8.7 feet (2.7 m) radius, from the west an 81 feet (25 m) bore, then 24 feet (7.3 m) in the open, then a 288 feet (88 m) bore. East tunnel has two windows, one with a cliffside walkway to the open in-between area. Refined and enlarged in 1921 and 1938.
Rock Creek Bridge		45.68481°N 121.40478°W	Built in 1918, a "44-foot reinforced-concrete structure consists of two 22-foot slab spans. Railings were similar to those on the Tanner Creek Bridge. Decades ago, they were removed and replaced with wooden rails. In 1996, ODOT reconstructed the original concrete railings."
Mosier Creek Bridge	An open spandrel concrete arched bridge	45.68468°N 121.39443°W	A 110 feet (34 m) open spandrel concrete ribbed deck arch bridge with a parabolic arch form, the first of many bridges in Oregon to be designed by Conde McCullough.
Rowena Dell Bridge		45.67788°N 121.31411°W	20 feet (6.1 m) bridge.
Dry Canyon Creek Bridge	Another open spandrel concrete arch bridge, in 2010	45.68136°N 121.30366°W	
Chenoweth Creek Bridge		45.63156°N 121.21651°W	Built in 1920, it "is a 60-foot reinforced-concrete deck girder span consisting of three 20-foot multibeam spans. Its original reinforced-concrete parapet rails have been replaced with steel "W" rail. Chenoweth Creek Bridge marks the eastern end of the CRH Historic District."
Mill Creek Bridge		45.60308°N 121.19347°W, W. 6th St., The Dalles	Not mentioned in NHL doc?

== See also ==
- List of Oregon covered bridges
- List of bridges in the United States
