= Coopey Falls =

Coordinates: 45°33′44″N 122°09′57″W

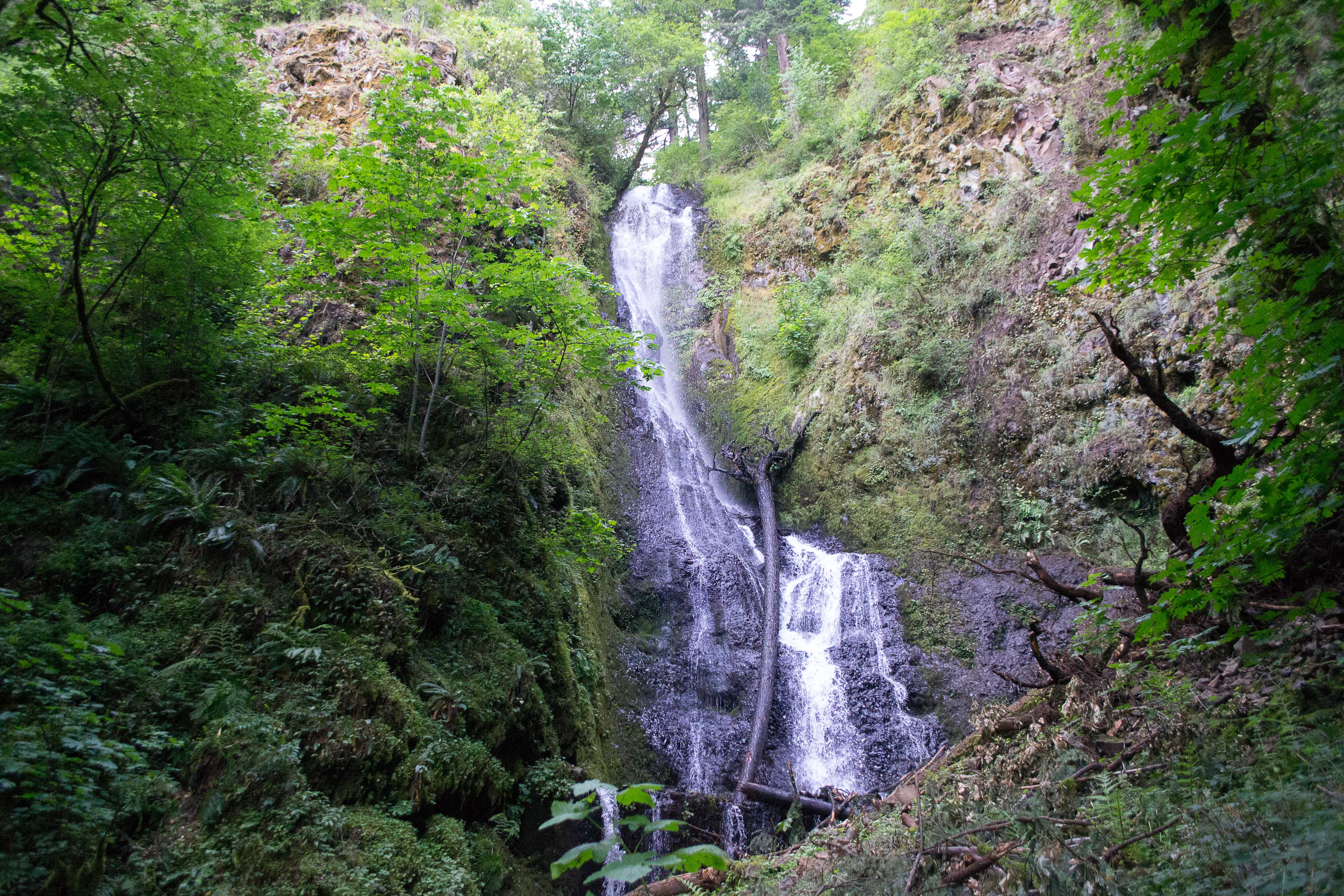
- A view of Coopey Falls from a trail above the Franciscan Sisters of the Eucharist Abbey.
- Interactive map of Coopey Falls
- Location: Multnomah County, Oregon, U.S.

Coopey Falls is a waterfall on Coopey Creek in the Columbia River Gorge, on the Historic Columbia River Highway in Multnomah County, Oregon. The falls is a horsetail waterfall with a drop of 150 feet (46 m).

The falls was named after Charles Coopey, who once owned the land adjacent to the falls. Simon Benson bought Wahkeena Falls from Coopey, an English tailor who had wanted to use the water from Wahkeena Falls to power a woolen mill for spinning and weaving, and for wool scouring.

Coopey Falls is on private property behind a convent owned by the Franciscan Sisters of the Eucharist. The sisters invite visitors to view the falls by following a path leading from the parking lot in front of the convent, after first asking permission.

A view of the falls is also accessible from the Angels's Rest trailhead a half mile west of the convent. The falls are located one mile (1.6 km) east of Bridal Veil Falls.
