= Toms Creek =

Toms Creek may refer to:

- Toms Creek, Virginia, an unincorporated community and coal town in Wise County
- Toms Creek, Montgomery County, Virginia, an unincorporated community
- Toms Creek (Missouri), a stream in Missouri
- Toms Creek (Uwharrie River tributary), a stream in North Carolina
- Toms Creek (Ararat River tributary), a stream in Surry County, North Carolina
- Toms Creek (Monocacy River), a stream in Pennsylvania and Maryland
- Toms Creek Falls, a waterfall in North Carolina

== See also ==
- Tom Creek
