= Earnest Bridge =

Covered bridge in Oregon, US

Coordinates: 44.201111°N 122.836111°W

- U.S. National Register of Historic Places
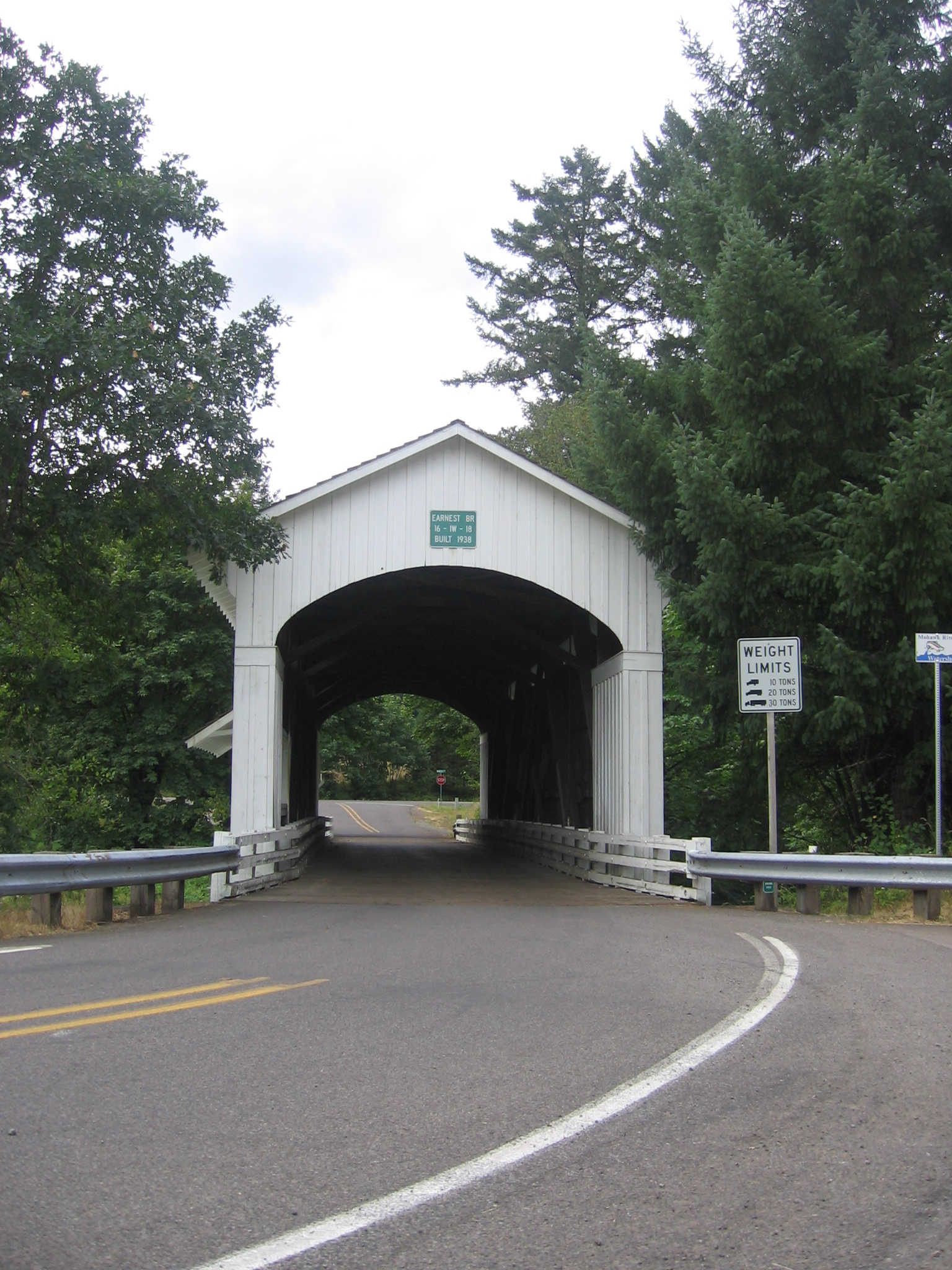
- The bridge in 2008

- Location within Oregon Location within the United States
- Nearest city: Marcola, Oregon
- Area: 0.1 acres (0.040 ha)
- Built: 1938
- Architectural style: Howe Trus
- MPS: Oregon Covered Bridges TR
- NRHP reference No.: 79002094
- Added to NRHP: November 29, 1979

The Earnest Bridge, located near Marcola, Oregon, is listed on the National Register of Historic Places. The name is spelled Ernest Bridge in some documents, including the NRHP listing, but spelled Earnest Bridge in the NRHP nomination and in signage on the bridge itself.

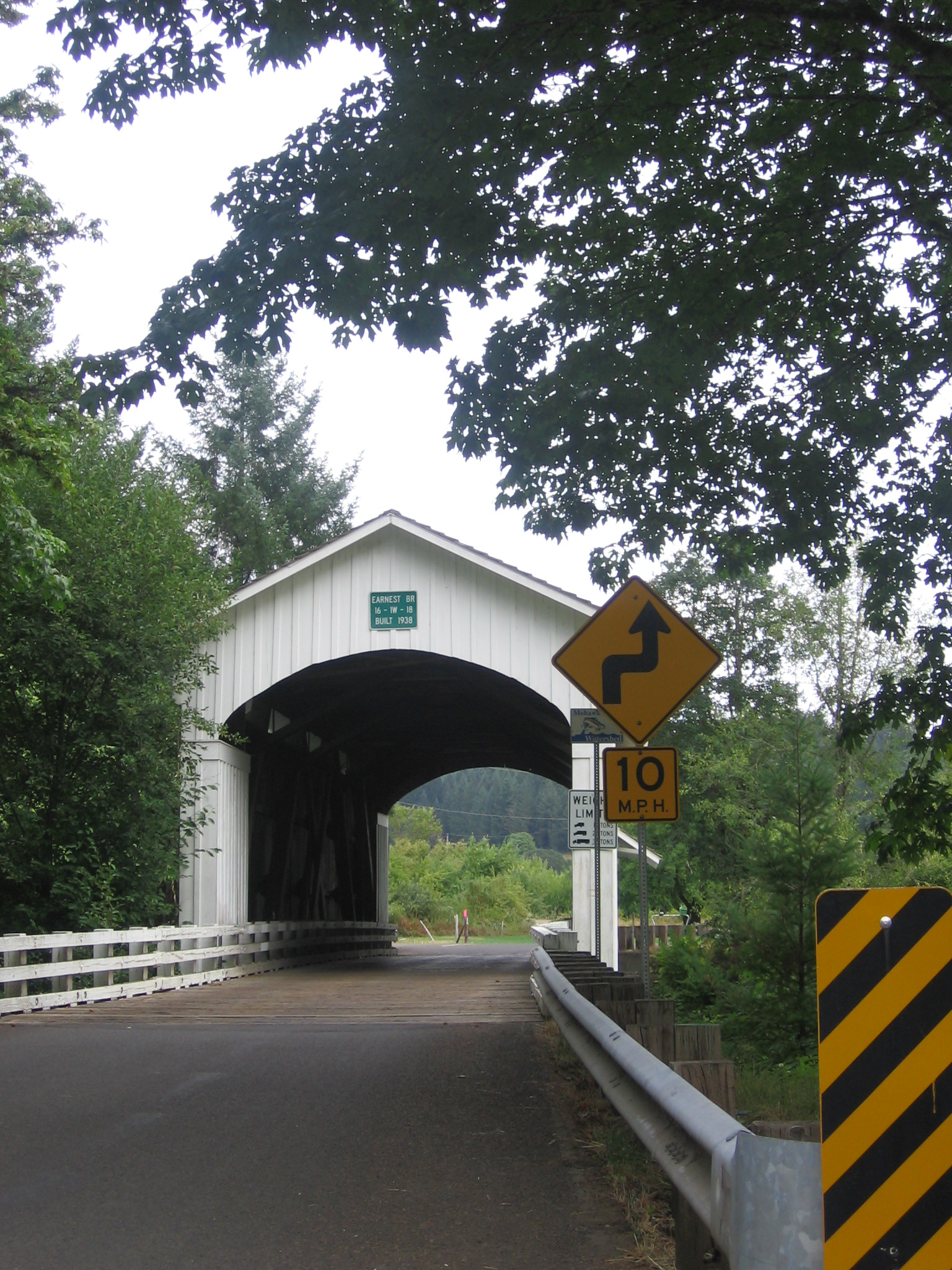
Earnest Covered Bridge, Lane County, Oregon

== See also ==
- List of bridges on the National Register of Historic Places in Oregon
- National Register of Historic Places listings in Lane County, Oregon
