= Lost Creek Bridge =

Covered bridge in Oregon, US

- U.S. National Register of Historic Places
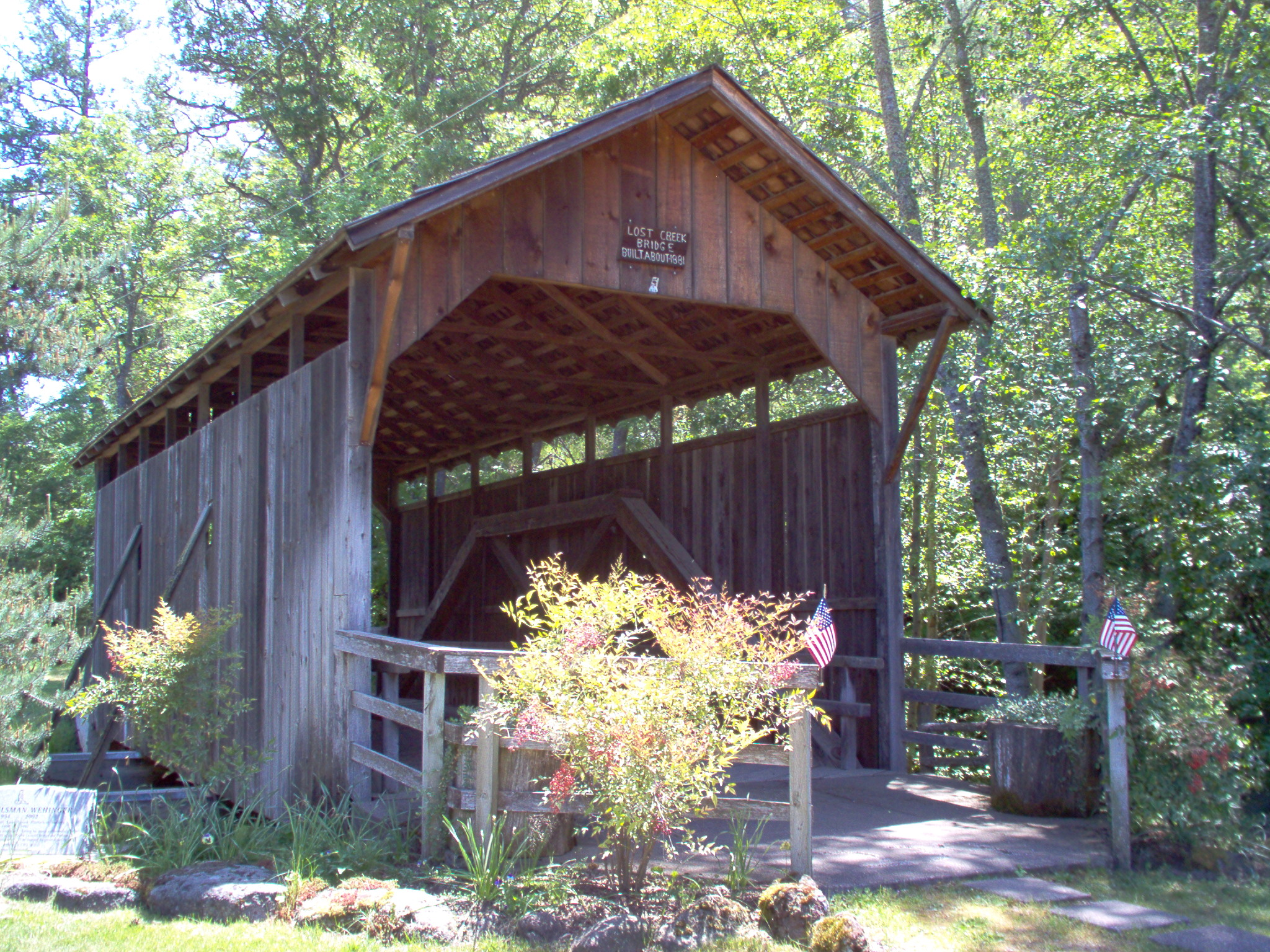
- Lost Creek Bridge over Lost Creek

- Location within Oregon Location within the United States
- Nearest city: Medford, Oregon
- Coordinates: 42°22′48.5″N 122°34′46.2″W
- Built: 1919
- Built by: Johnny Miller
- Architectural style: Queenpost truss
- MPS: Oregon Covered Bridges TR
- NRHP reference No.: 79002070
- Added to NRHP: 1979

The Lost Creek Bridge is a covered bridge near the unincorporated community of Lake Creek, in Jackson County in the U.S. state of Oregon. The site is about 15 miles (24 km) east-northeast of Medford. At 39 feet (12 m) long, the structure is the shortest historic covered bridge in Oregon. It carries Lost Creek Road over Lost Creek, a tributary of Little Butte Creek.

The bridge was added to the National Register of Historic Places in 1979. In that same year, it was closed to vehicle traffic. A newer concrete bridge runs parallel to the wooden bridge and serves as a bypass.

Anecdotal accounts and limited evidence suggest that the bridge might have been built as early as 1878. If confirmed, this would make it the oldest standing covered bridge in the state. The Oregon Department of Transportation says that the official construction date of 1919 may actually refer to a renovation of an older bridge.

== Architecture ==
The truss of the bridge is a queen post-style modified by cross members. Other features include open ends rather than the usual portal arches, ribbon openings at the eaves, and buttresses that are cantilevered. The bridge has a shingle roof and a floor of diagonal planking. Local residents installed a new roof in 1985.

== Park ==
Adjacent to the bridge is the Walch Family Wayside Park. Descendants of pioneer settlers John and Marie Newsome Walch built and maintain the park, which includes picnic tables, a bandstand, flower gardens, and other amenities.

== See also ==
- List of bridges on the National Register of Historic Places in Oregon
- List of Oregon covered bridges
- List of Registered Historic Places in Jackson County, Oregon
