= Sandy River Bridge =

Bridge in Troutdale, Oregon, U.S.

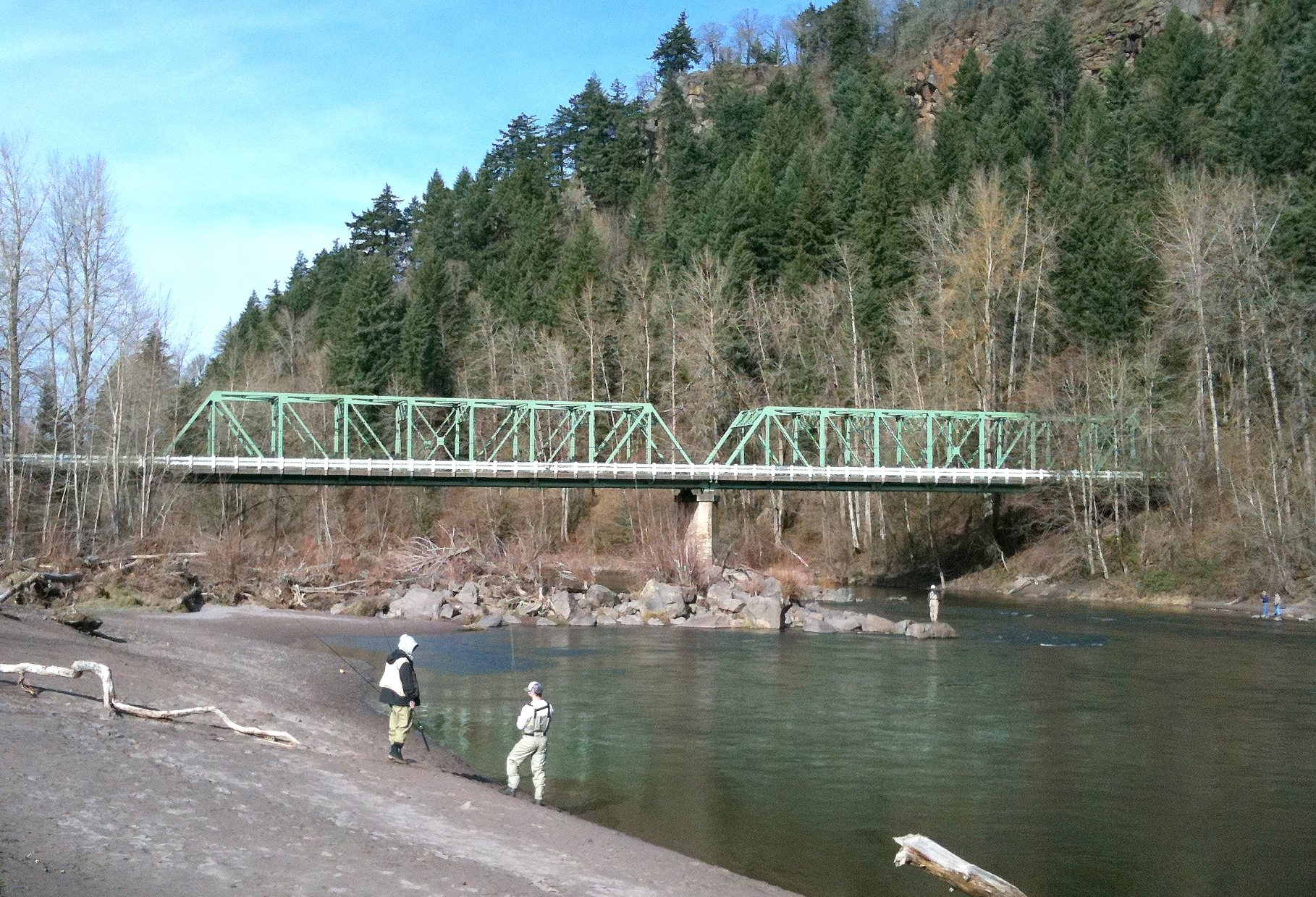
- The bridge in 2010
- Coordinates: 45°32′18″N 122°22′36″W
- Locale: Troutdale, Oregon, U.S.

Characteristics
- Design: Pratt truss

History
- Opened: 1914

The Sandy River Bridge, also known as the Troutdale Bridge, is a bridge spanning the Sandy River in Troutdale, Oregon, United States.

== See also ==
- List of bridges documented by the Historic American Engineering Record in Oregon
- List of bridges on the National Register of Historic Places in Oregon
