= Thomas Cheek (disambiguation) =

Thomas Cheek (died 1659) was an English politician.

Thomas Cheek may also refer to:

- Thomas Cheek (Australian politician) (1894–1994)
- Tom Cheek (1939–2005), American sportscaster

== See also ==
- Thomas Creek (disambiguation)
