= Balch Gulch Bridge =

Bridge in Portland, Oregon, U.S.

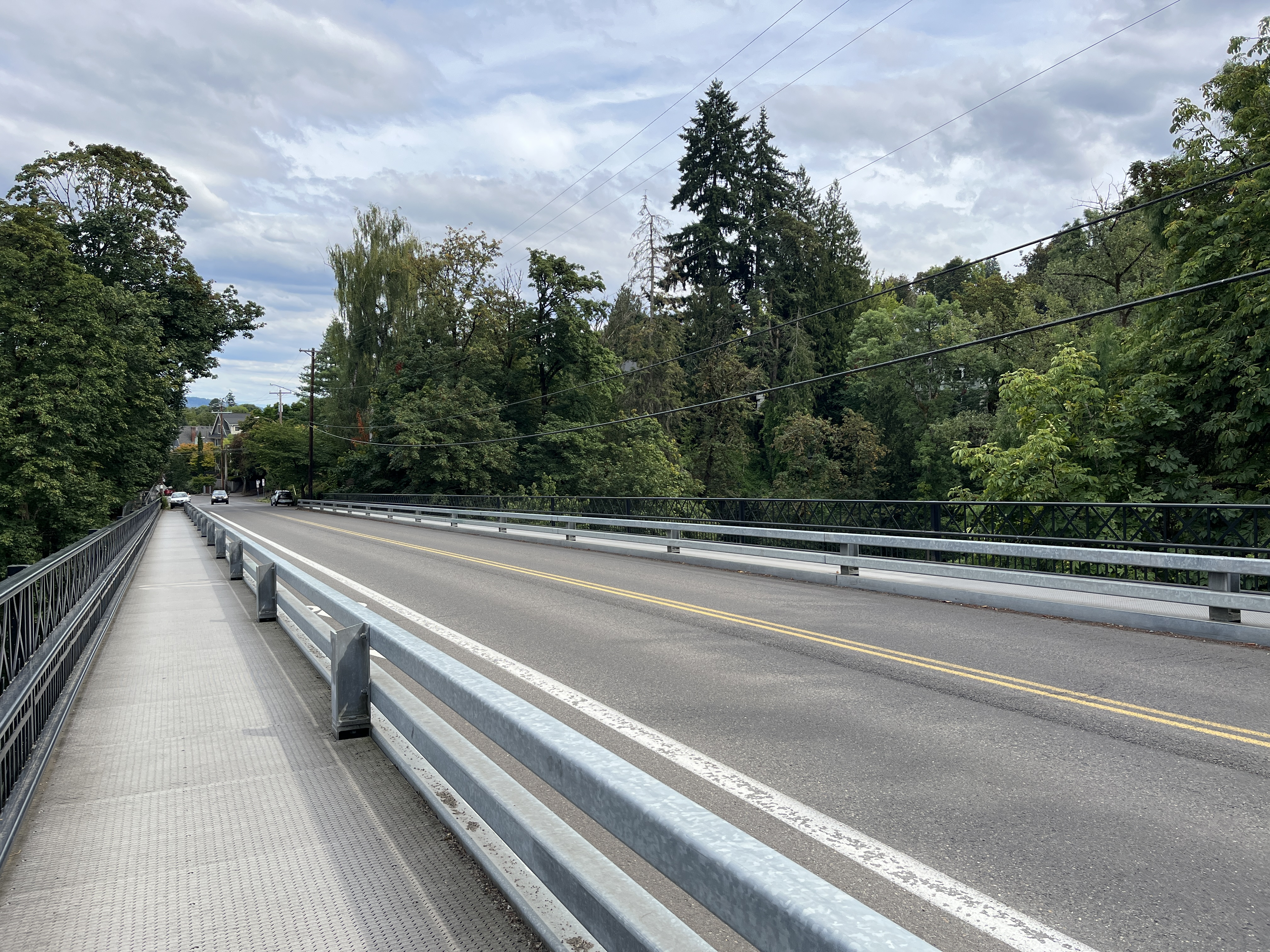
- The bridge in 2025
- Coordinates: 45.53558°N 122.71258°W
- Carries: Thurman Street
- Crosses: Balch Gulch
- Locale: Portland, Oregon, United States
- Other names: Thurman Street Bridge; Northwest Thurman Street Bridge

Characteristics
- Design: Pratt deck
- Total length: 400 ft (120 m)
- Width: 26.9 ft (8.2 m)
- No. of spans: 1
- No. of lanes: 2

Location
- Interactive map of Balch Gulch Bridge

References
- Balch Gulch Bridge
- U.S. National Register of Historic Places
- Location: 3010 NW Thurman Street, Portland, Oregon
- NRHP reference No.: 100012332
- Added to NRHP: September 23, 2025

The Balch Gulch Bridge, also known as the Thurman Street Bridge, is a bridge in Northwest Portland, Oregon, United States.

The bridge is a pratt deck truss built in 1905. On September 23, 2025, the bridge was added to the National Register of Historic Places.

== See also ==
- List of bridges on the National Register of Historic Places in Oregon
- National Register of Historic Places listings in Northwest Portland, Oregon
