= Oregon Railway and Navigation Company Bridge =

- U.S. National Register of Historic Places
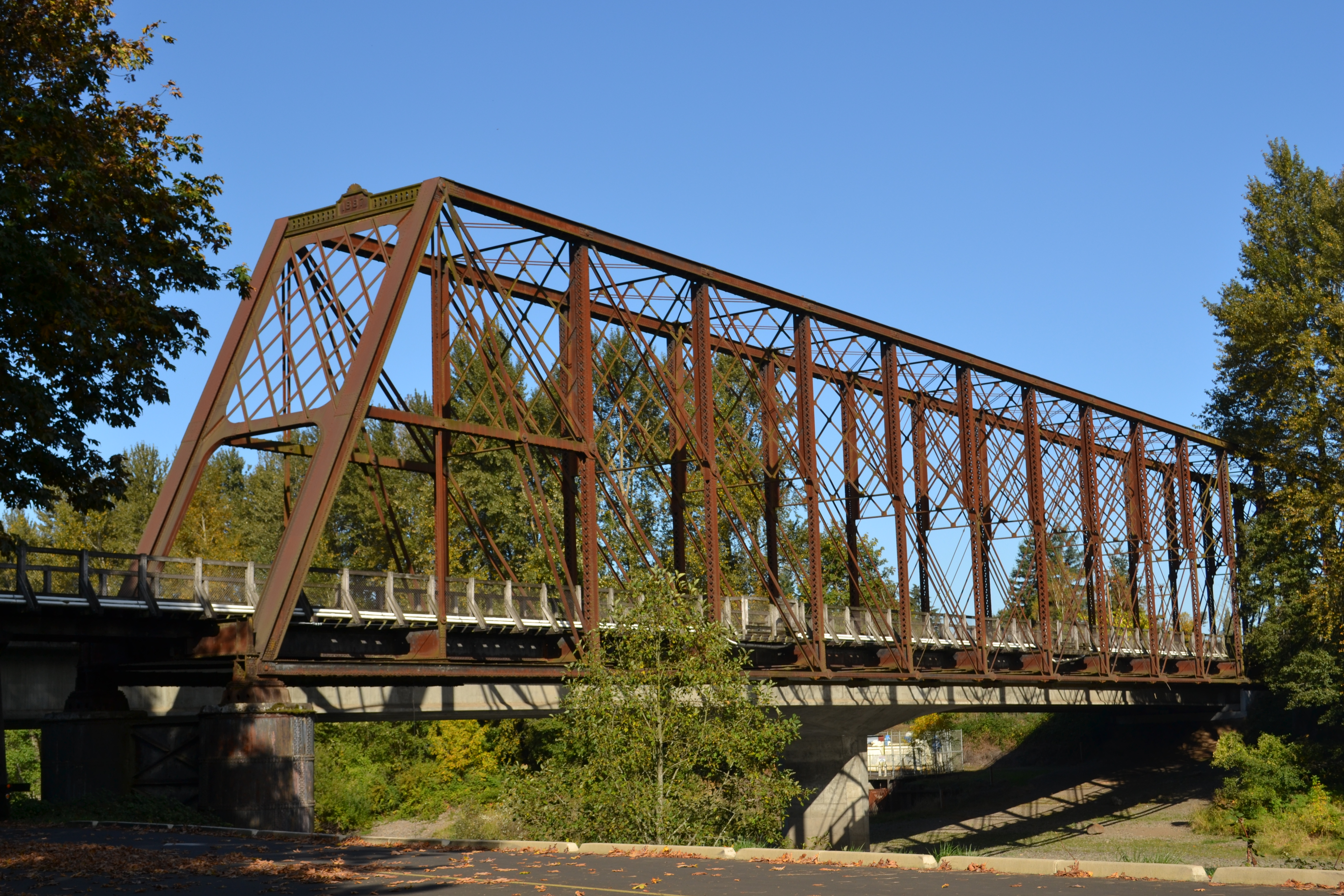
- Bridge over the McKenzie River near Coburg

- Location within Oregon Location within the United States
- Nearest city: Eugene
- Coordinates: 44°06′44.13″N 123°02′49.25″W
- Built: 1887
- Architectural style: Double intersection Pratt through truss (Whipple)
- NRHP reference No.: 80003332
- Listed: March 13, 1980

The Oregon Railway and Navigation Company Bridge is a railroad bridge in Lane County in the U.S. state of Oregon. Added to the National Register of Historic Places in 1980, it formerly carried the tracks of the Southern Pacific Transportation Company over the McKenzie River southeast of Coburg. It has since become a pedestrian and bicycle bridge. The Whipple through truss bridge, resting on concrete supports, is 405 feet (123 m) long, 25 feet (7.6 m) wide, and 44 feet (13 m) high.

Built in 1887 for the Oregon Railway and Navigation Company by George S. Morison and installed over the John Day River in north-central Oregon, it was bought by the Southern Pacific in 1907 and moved to the McKenzie River by the American Bridge Company. Made of iron, it replaced a wooden covered bridge constructed at the site in 1891. The earlier bridge, 380 feet (120 m) long, was one of the longest such structures ever built. It replaced the function of Spores Ferry, which began operation a short distance upstream in 1847 and was an important crossing for wagon trains.

Coburg Road crosses the river on a highway bridge next to the railway bridge, and Interstate 5 crosses on a different highway bridge slightly further upstream. Armitage County Park, which borders Eugene, is along the south side of the river near the bridges.

== See also ==
- List of bridges on the National Register of Historic Places in Oregon
