= Thomas Creek (North Fork Salt River tributary) =

Stream in Shelby County, Missouri, U.S.

Coordinates: 39.705595°N 91.956280°W

Thomas Creek is a stream in Shelby County in the U.S. state of Missouri. It is a tributary of the North Fork Salt River.

Thomas Creek has the name of Henson Thomas, an early settler.

== See also ==
- List of rivers of Missouri
