= Lost Creek (South Fork Little Butte Creek tributary) =

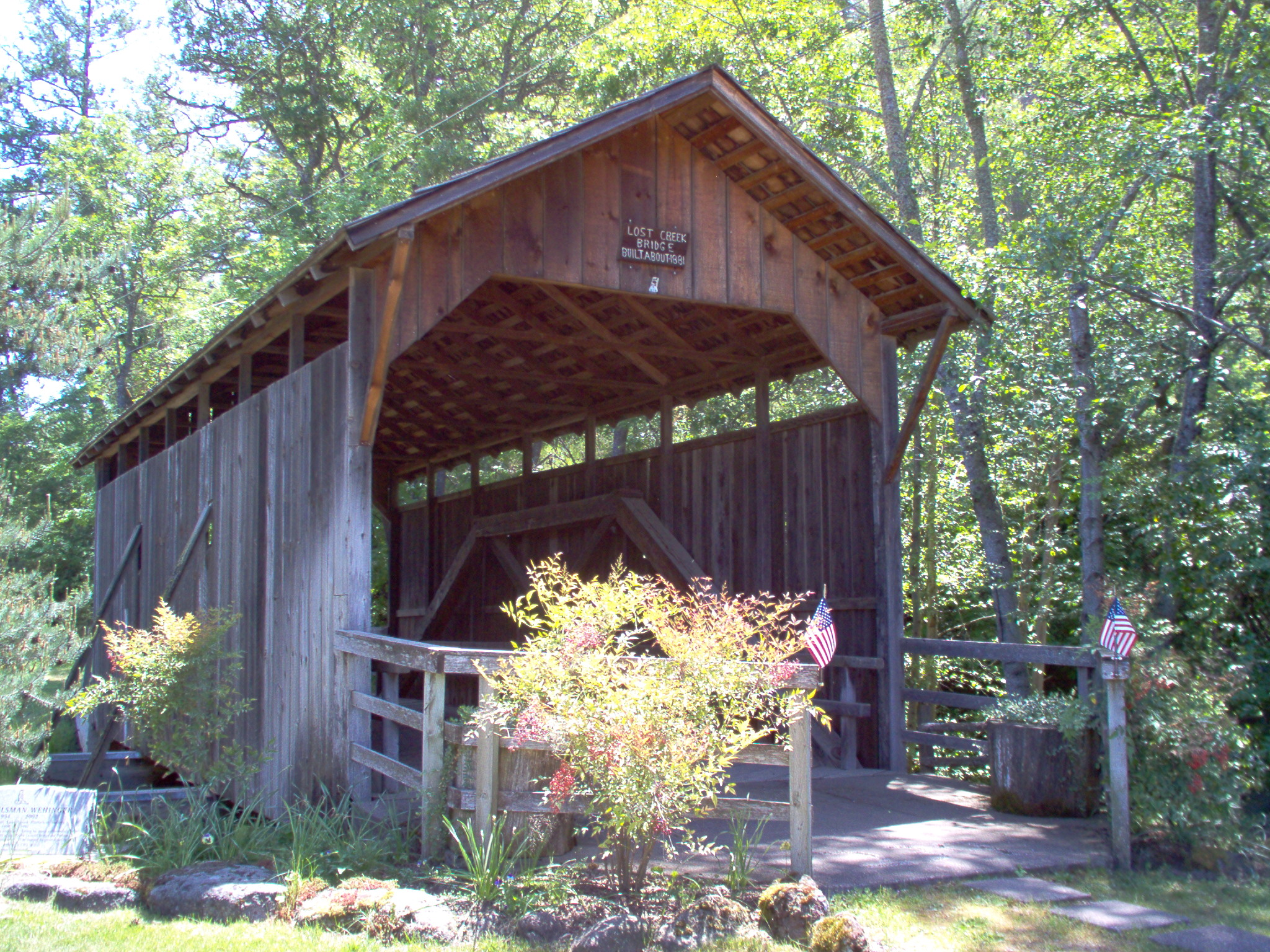
- Lost Creek Bridge in 2007

- Location of the mouth of Lost Creek in Oregon

Location
- Country: United States
- State: Oregon
- County: Jackson

Physical characteristics
- Source: Cascade Range
  - location: near Lost Lake, east of Medford
  - coordinates: 42°17′13″N 122°31′31″W
  - elevation: 4,716 ft (1,437 m)
- Mouth: South Fork Little Butte Creek
  - location: near Lake Creek
  - coordinates: 42°23′11″N 122°35′04″W
  - elevation: 1,824 ft (556 m)
- Basin size: 17.2 sq mi (45 km^{2})

Lost Creek is a tributary of the south fork of Little Butte Creek in Jackson County in the U.S. state of Oregon. Flowing north from near Lost Lake east of Medford, it enters the larger stream about 4 miles (6 km) upstream of the rural community of Lake Creek and about 20 miles (32 km) from the confluence of Little Butte Creek with the Rogue River. The only named tributary of Lost Creek is Coon Creek, which enters from the left.

Lost Creek Bridge, a covered bridge, carries Lost Creek Road over the creek but is closed to vehicular traffic. The 39-foot (12 m) structure is the shortest covered bridge in Oregon. It was added to the National Register of Historic Places in 1979.

== See also ==
- List of rivers of Oregon
