= Bridal Veil Falls (Oregon) =

Waterfall located in Oregon, United States

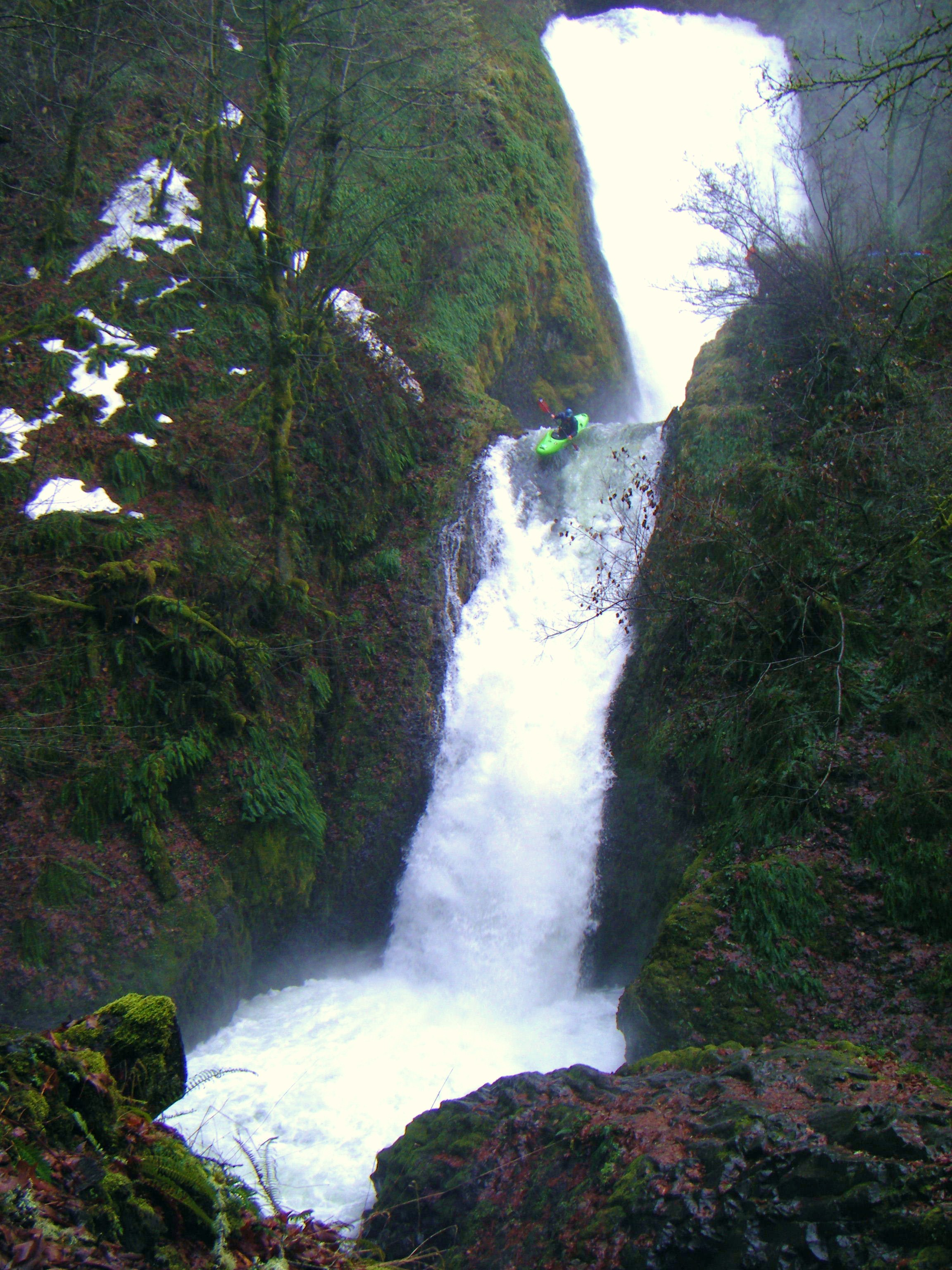
- A kayaker heading down Bridal Veil Falls

- Location within Oregon
- Location: Columbia River Gorge
- Coordinates: 45.554841°N 122.180922°W
- Elevation: 139 ft (42 m)
- Total height: 118 ft (36 m)
- Number of drops: 2
- Average width: 25 ft (7.6 m)
- Watercourse: Bridal Veil Creek

The Bridal Veil Falls is a waterfall located on Bridal Veil Creek along the Columbia River Gorge in Multnomah County, Oregon, United States. The waterfall is accessible from the historic Columbia River Highway and Interstate 84. Spanning two tiers on basalt cliffs, it is the only waterfall which occurs below the historic Columbia Gorge Scenic Highway. The Bridal Veil Falls Bridge, built in 1914, crosses over the falls, and is listed on the National Register of Historic Places.

== Structure ==
The falls drops in two major steps, split into an upper falls and a lower falls with a total height of the waterfall at 118 feet (36 m). The two drops are due to a zone of more easily eroded basalt defile at the base of the upper falls. A massive basalt boulder detached from the cliff and lies in the creek along the pool below.

=== Water source ===
Underground springs from Larch Mountain are the year-round source of water for the waterfall, augmented by spring runoff from the mountain's snowpack and rainwater during the other seasons. This spring is the source of Bridal Veil Creek. During the years of logging upstream of Bridal Veil Creek, the river ran dry and the waterfall had disappeared. Once logging ceased, the river returned to its course, restoring the waterfall to its current feature.

== Bridal Veil Falls Bridge ==
The Historic Columbia River Highway passes over Bridal Veil Falls on a bridge, the Bridal Veil Falls Bridge, which is listed on the National Register of Historic Places as a contributing structure. It is a skewed 100 feet (30 m) reinforced-concrete span, and is unique in its design in which its solid railings serve as continuous beams and transverse deck support members function as deck girders.

The falls consists of two cascades in quick succession along angling rockfaces, such that when there is enough water, the falls look like a bridal veil.

There is a post office in the nearby community of Bridal Veil. Many couples have their wedding invitations shipped there in order to have the town's postmark applied to them.

== Logging ==
Bridal Veil Creek runs along Palmer Mill road from Larch Mountain, towards the now extinct community of Bridal Veil. Logging was a successful enterprise upstream of the waterfall by Bridal Veil Falls Timber Company. The sawmill community was a thriving area that eventually dried the creek and made its namesake waterfall disappear. Currently Bridal Veil is a ghost town east of the waterfall. Before the lumber mill, the area was exploited by a paper mill.

In 1937, the mill site was purchased by the Kraft company where cheese boxes were made. During World War II, Kraft used the mill to manufacture wooden ammunition boxes. The mill was sold in the 1960s and operations ceased and resumed in 1974 as a resaw mill until 1988.

== See also ==
- List of waterfalls
- List of waterfalls in Oregon
- List of bridges documented by the Historic American Engineering Record in Oregon
- List of bridges on the National Register of Historic Places in Oregon
