= Thomas Creek Bridge =

Bridge in Oregon, US

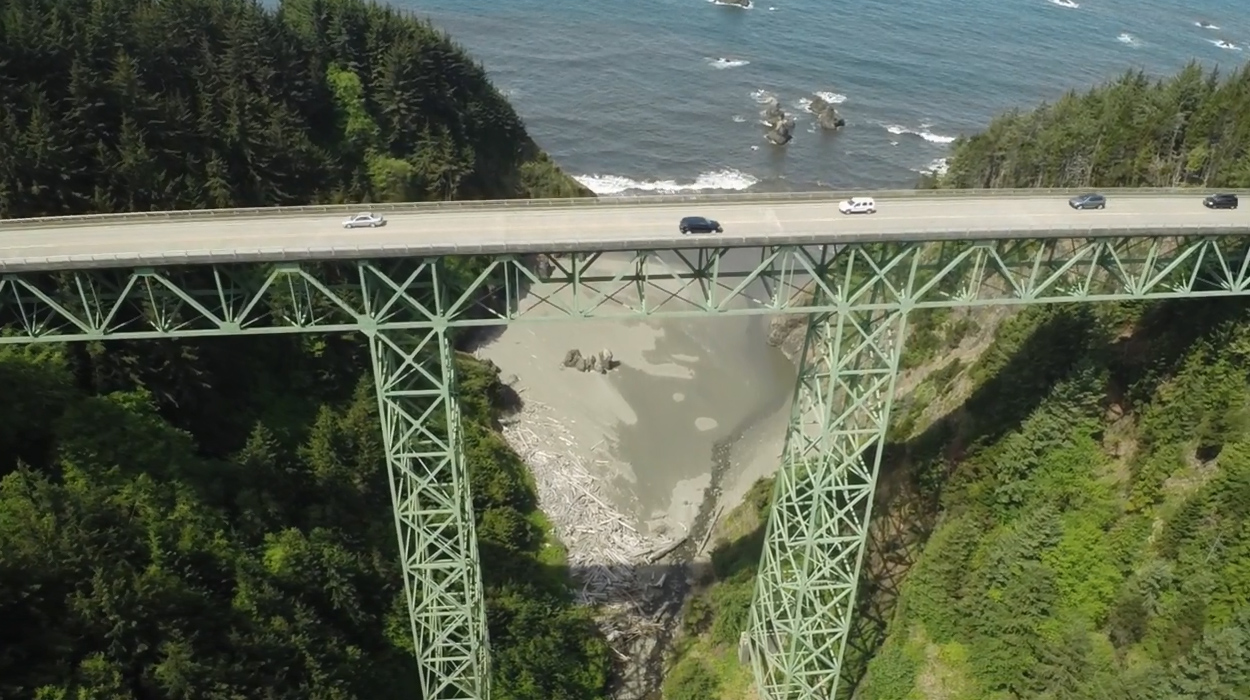
- Coordinates: 42.1659452°N 124.3589909°W
- Carries: US 101
- Crosses: Thomas Creek
- Locale: Curry County, Oregon

Characteristics
- Design: Warren deck truss
- Total length: 956 ft (291 m)
- Width: 30 ft (9.1 m)
- Height: 345 ft (105 m)
- Longest span: 371 ft (113 m)

History
- Opened: 1961

Statistics
- Daily traffic: 4,500 (2010)

Thomas Creek Bridge crosses Thomas Creek in Curry County, in the U.S. state of Oregon. It is on U.S. Route 101 and lies within the boundaries of Samuel H. Boardman State Scenic Corridor.

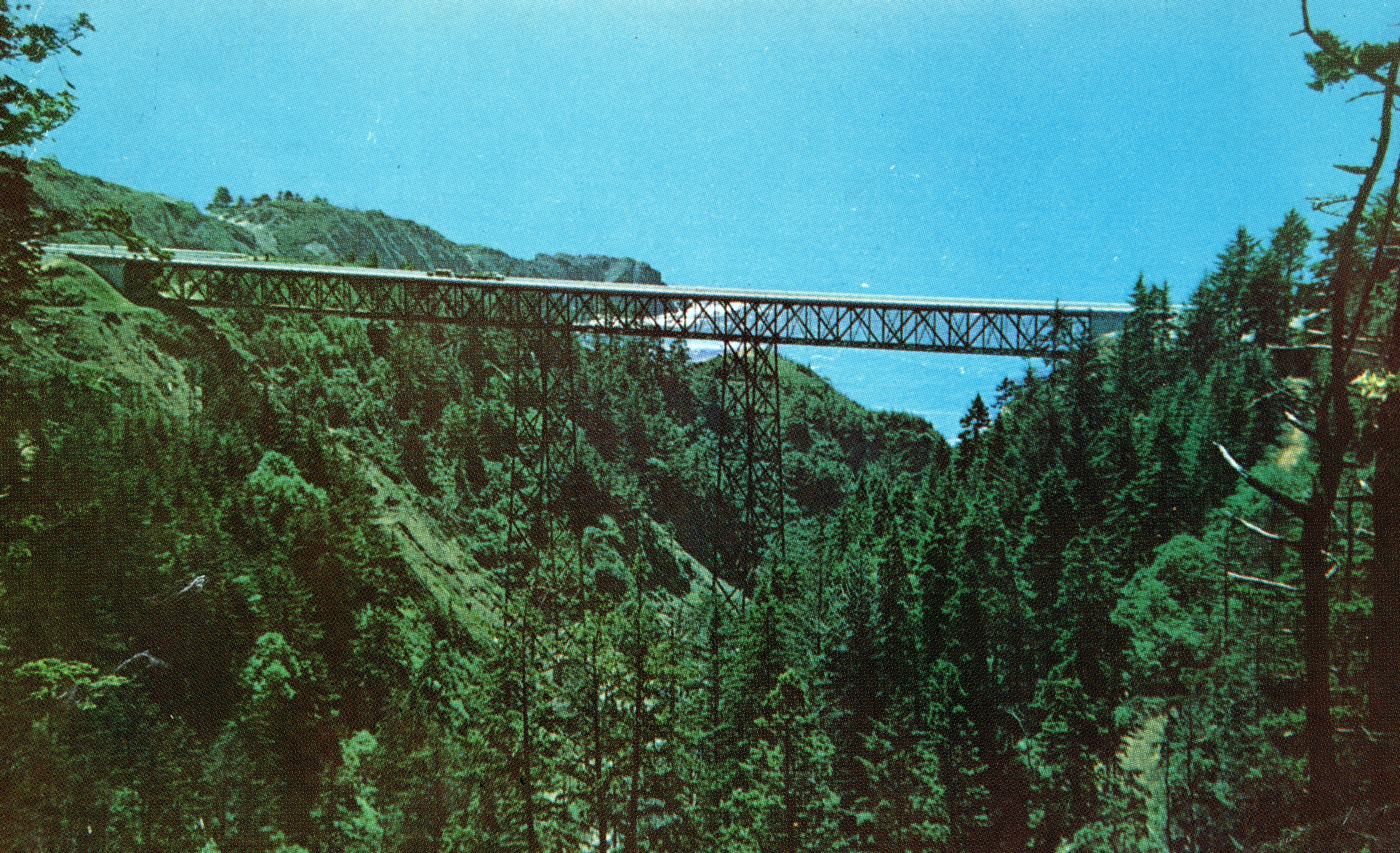
The bridge circa 1963

It is a Warren deck truss designed by Ivan D. Merchant. Built in 1961, it has a length of 956 feet (291 m) in total, and a deck width of 30 feet (9.1 m). The longest span is 371 feet (113 m). The bridge is the highest bridge in Oregon, at 345 feet (105 m).

== See also ==
- List of bridges in the United States by height
- List of bridges on U.S. Route 101 in Oregon
