= Lake Creek, Oregon =

Unincorporated community in the state of Oregon, United States

- Unincorporated community
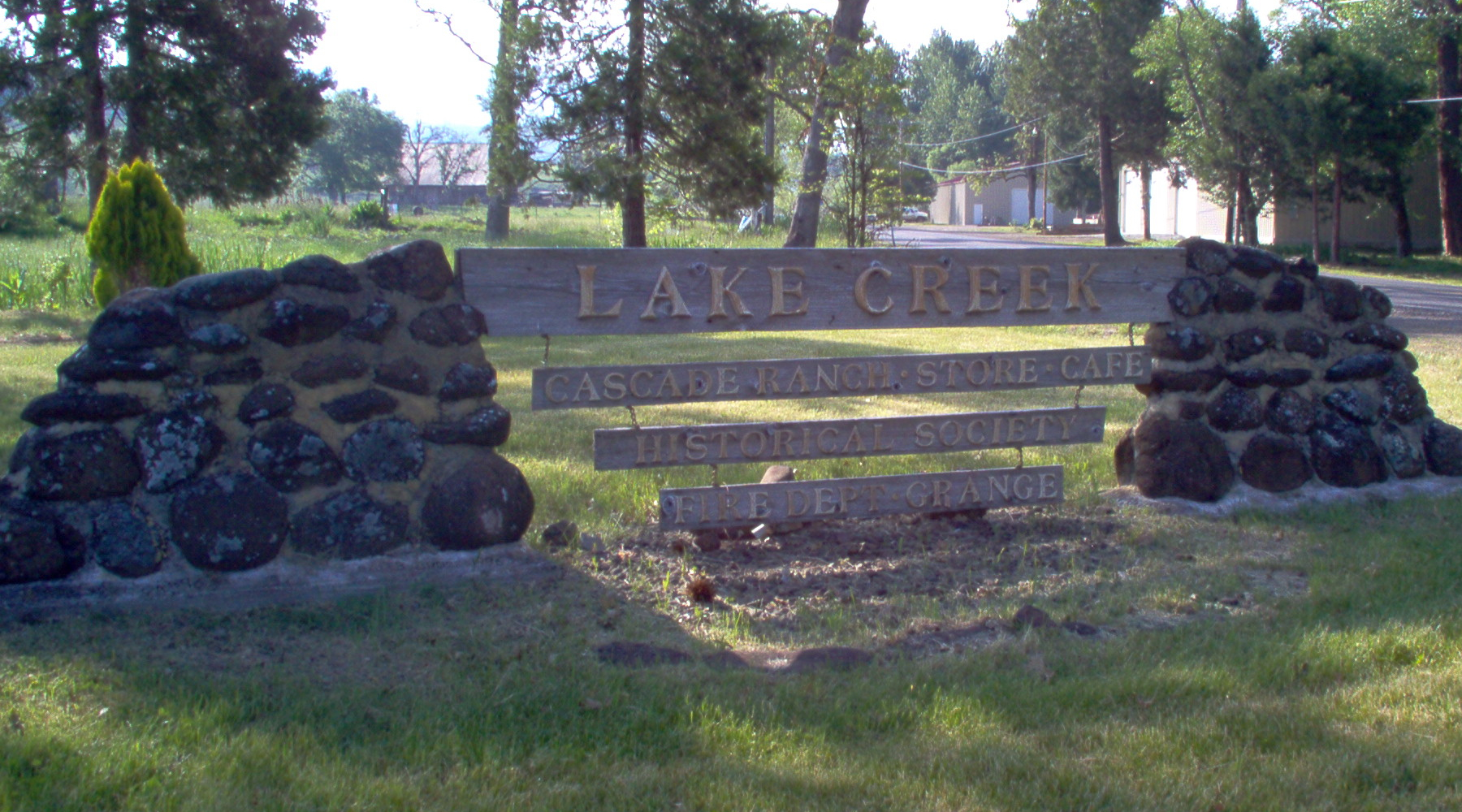
- Welcome to Lake Creek, Oregon

- Location within Oregon Location within the United States
- Coordinates: 42°25′21″N 122°37′30″W
- Country: United States
- State: Oregon
- County: Jackson
- Time zone: UTC-8 (Pacific (PST))
  - Summer (DST): UTC-7 (PDT)
- ZIP code: 97524
- Area codes: 458 and 541

Lake Creek is an unincorporated community about 20 miles (32 km) east of Medford, in Jackson County, Oregon, United States. The community takes its name from Lake Creek, an important local stream.

The stream joins Little Butte Creek at Lake Creek. Little Butte Creek is formed by its north and south forks slightly upstream of the community. The shortest covered bridge in Oregon is near Lake Creek, along Lost Creek, a tributary of South Fork Little Butte Creek. The Lost Creek Bridge is on the National Register of Historic Places and is also possibly the oldest standing covered bridge in Oregon.

== History ==
The Lake Creek post office was established on December 10, 1886. At the time the Post Office Department declined many proposed two-word post offices, thus the name of the post office was submitted as "Lakecreek" on the application of September 17, 1886. This official style remained even after the post office was discontinued on June 5, 1959, but the two-word name is what is used locally.

All correspondence originally destined for the "Lakecreek" post office was rerouted to the Eagle Point office, where it has been ever since. The post office building in Lake Creek also housed a general store, which still stands today (as of June 2007 it is closed for renovations). UPDATE: The Lake Creek General Store reopened its doors on July 24, 2009.

In June 2007, Brian Zablocky, a resident of Medford, Oregon, filed a request with the United States Board on Geographic Names (BGN) that the name be restored to the two-word local usage. The request was approved by the BGN on September 27, 2007 and went into effect a few days later.

== Pioneer Hall ==
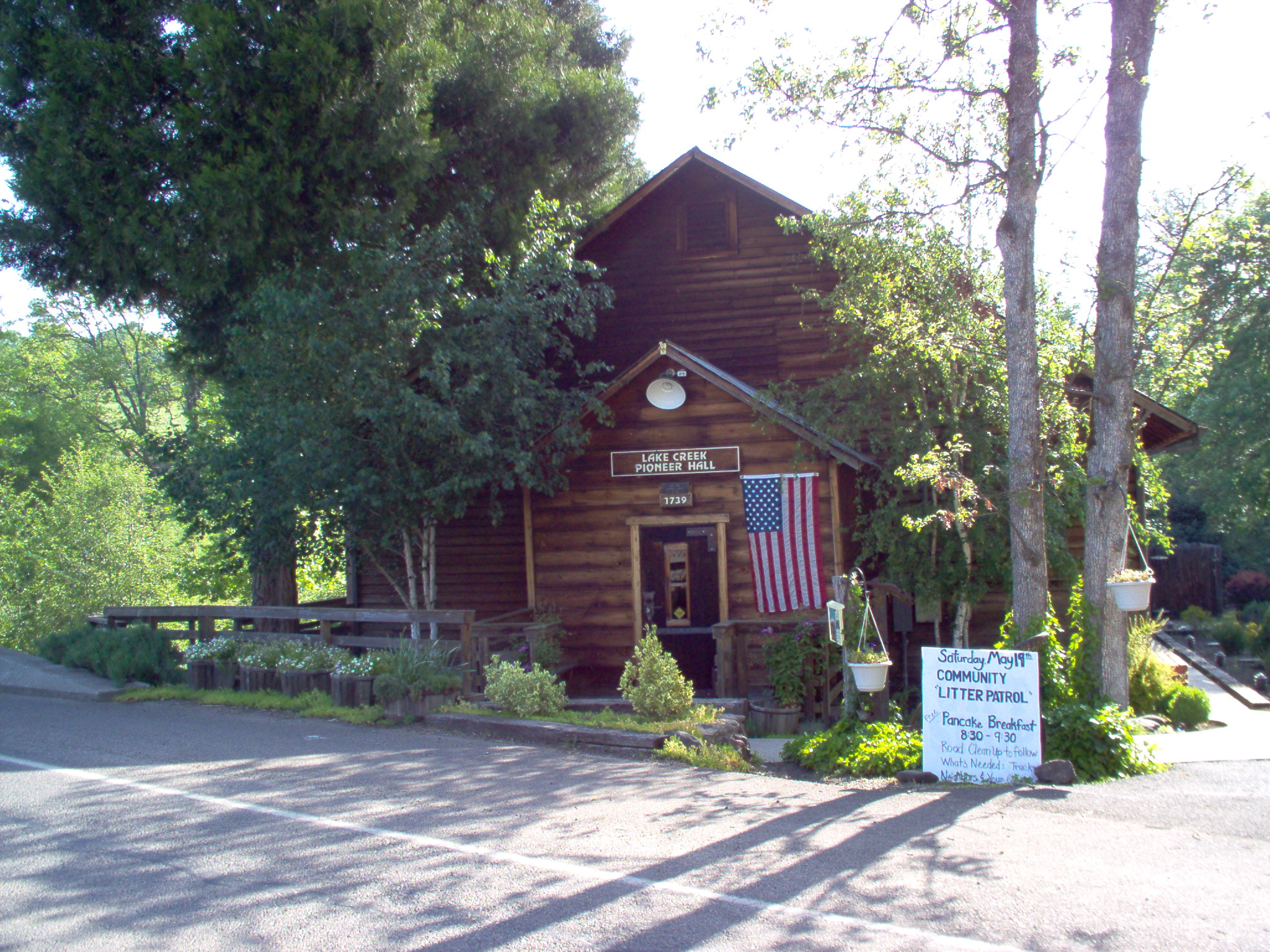
Pioneer Hall Est 1990

The Lake Creek Pioneer Hall was established in 1990 in the former Community Hall building. A group of local citizens, some of whom worked on the restoration of the nearby Lost Creek Bridge, congregated and restored the building, giving it a foundation, insulation, and a kitchen.

== Gallery ==
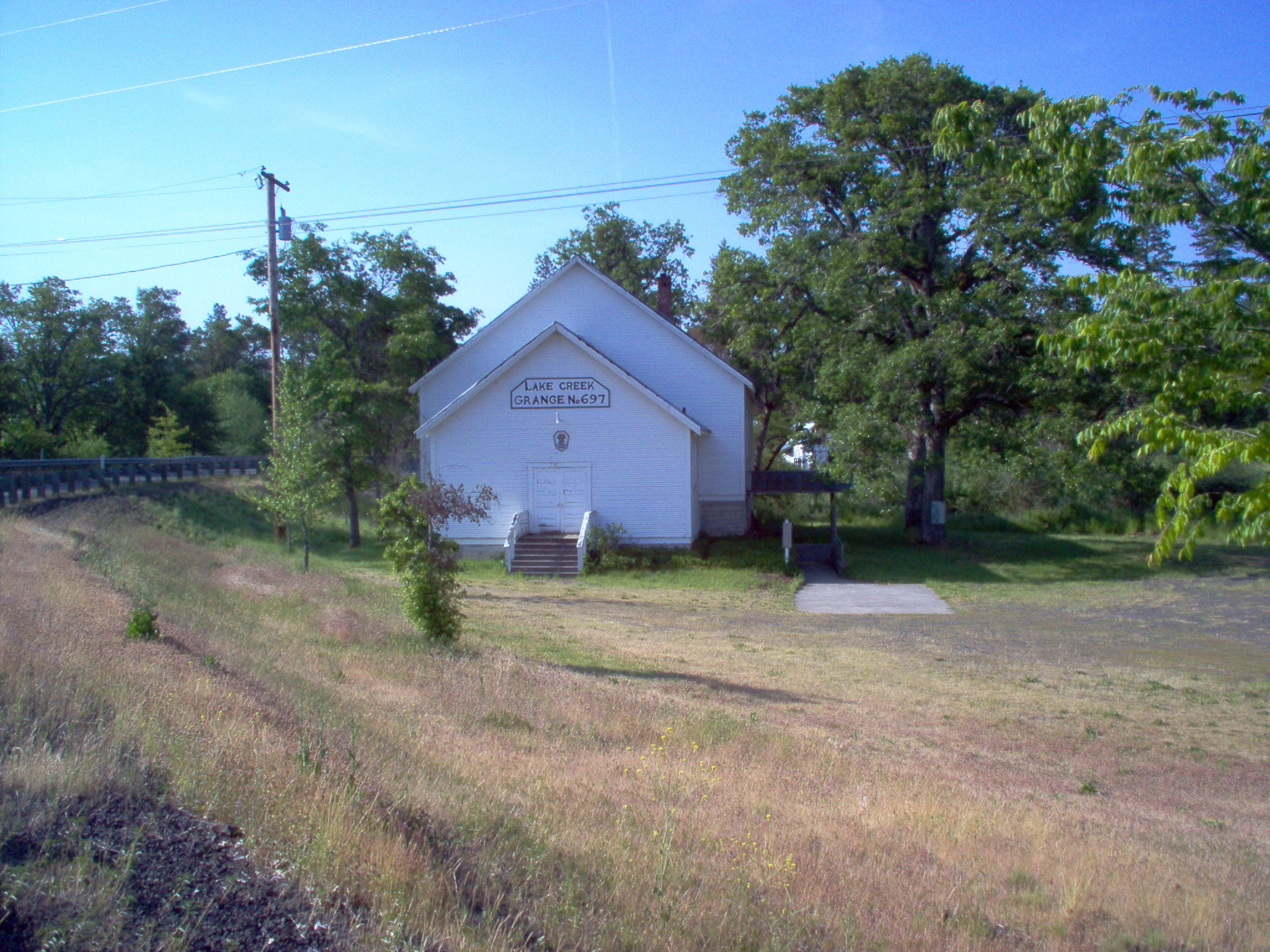
Lake Creek Grange

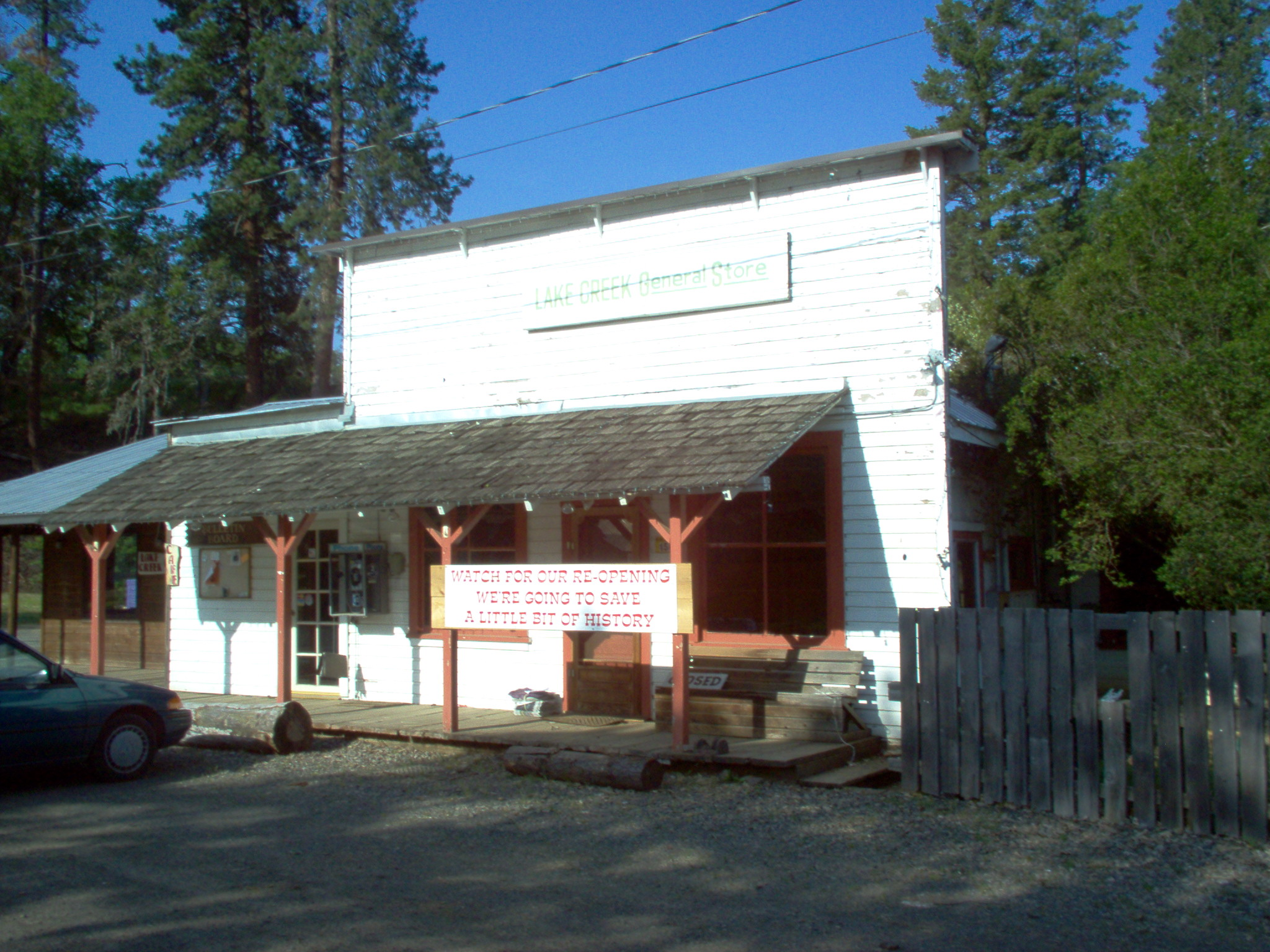
General Store and Old Post Office

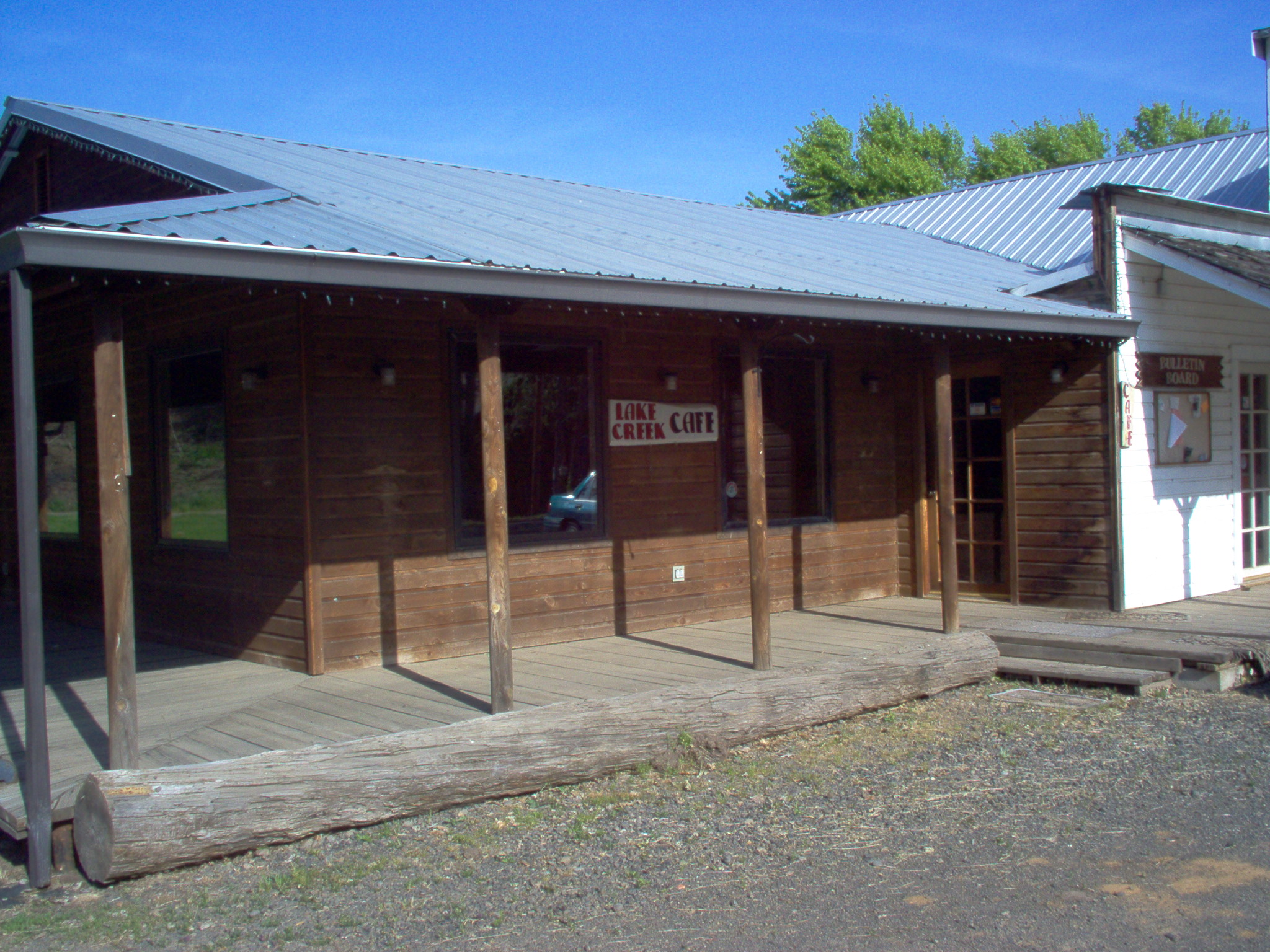
Lake Creek Cafe

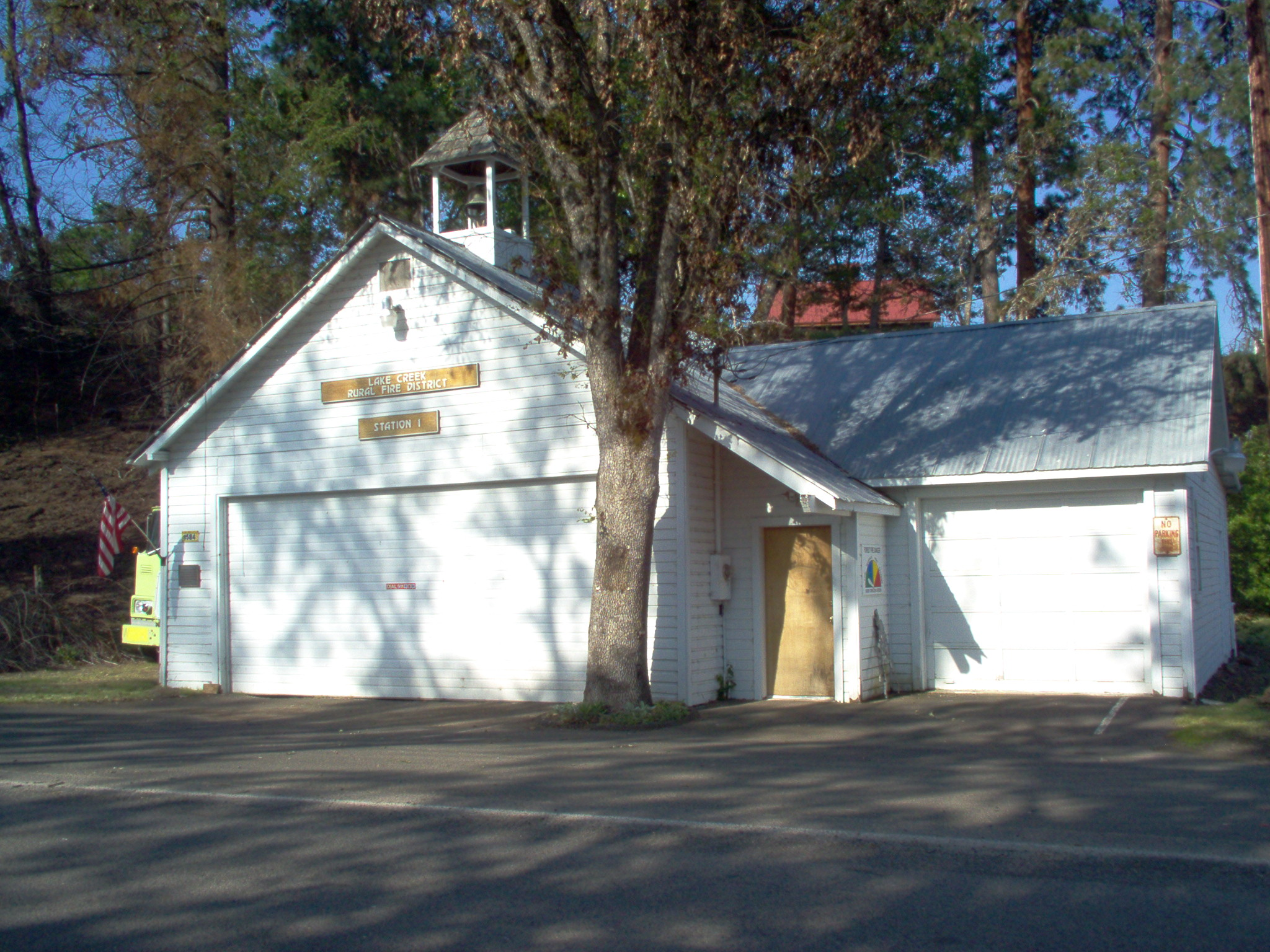
Lake Creek Fire District

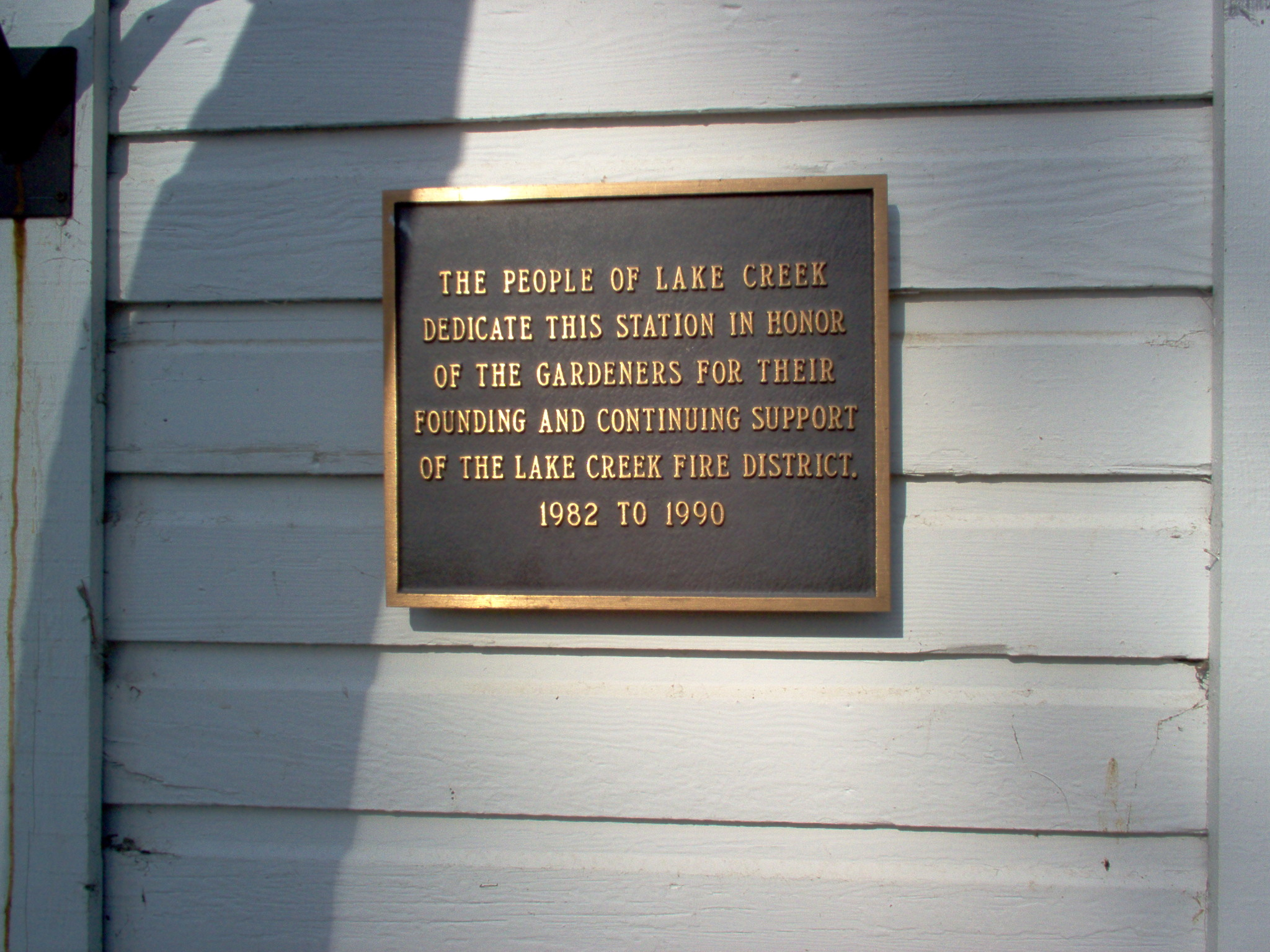
Plaque on the Station

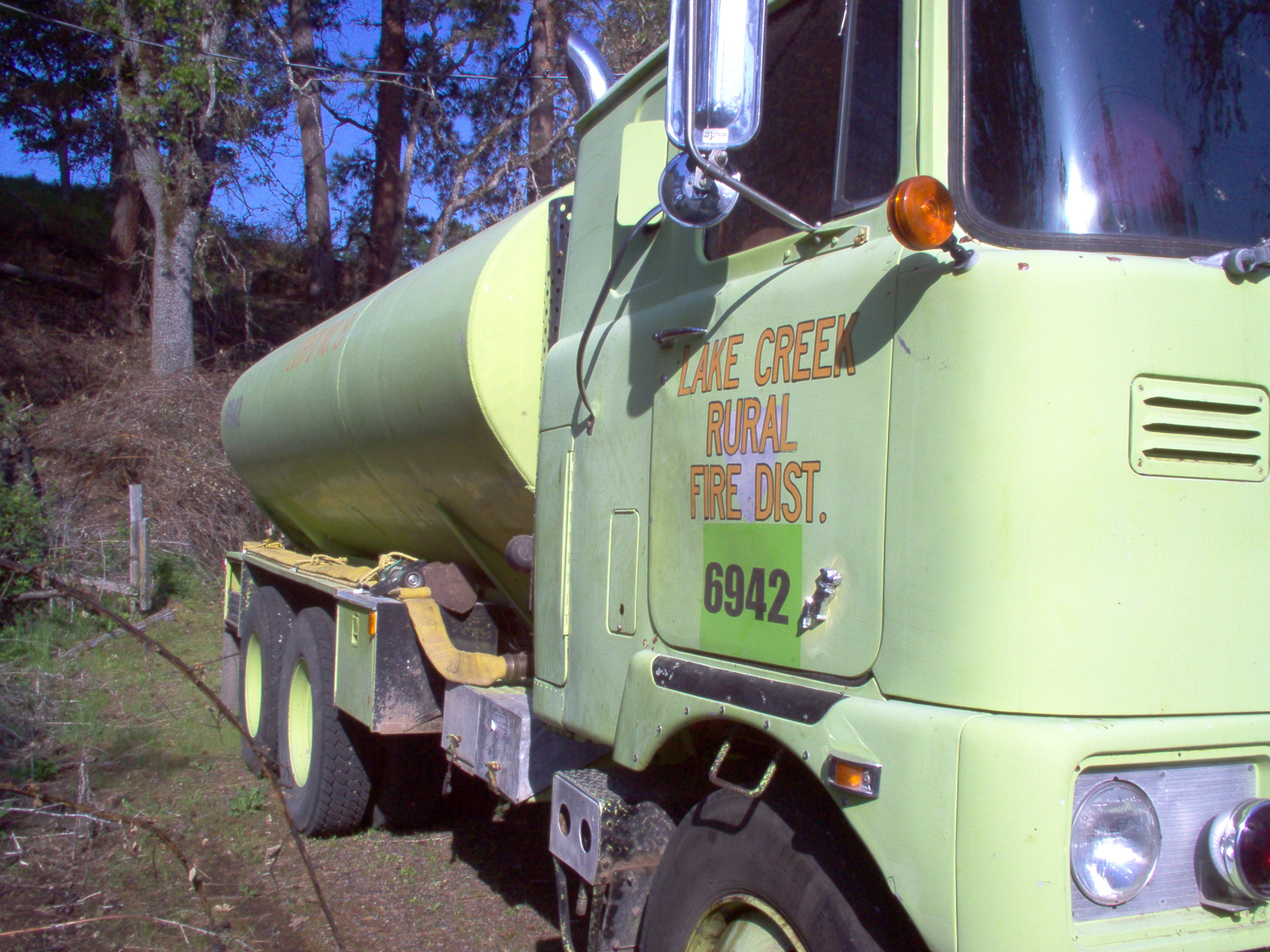
Old fire truck

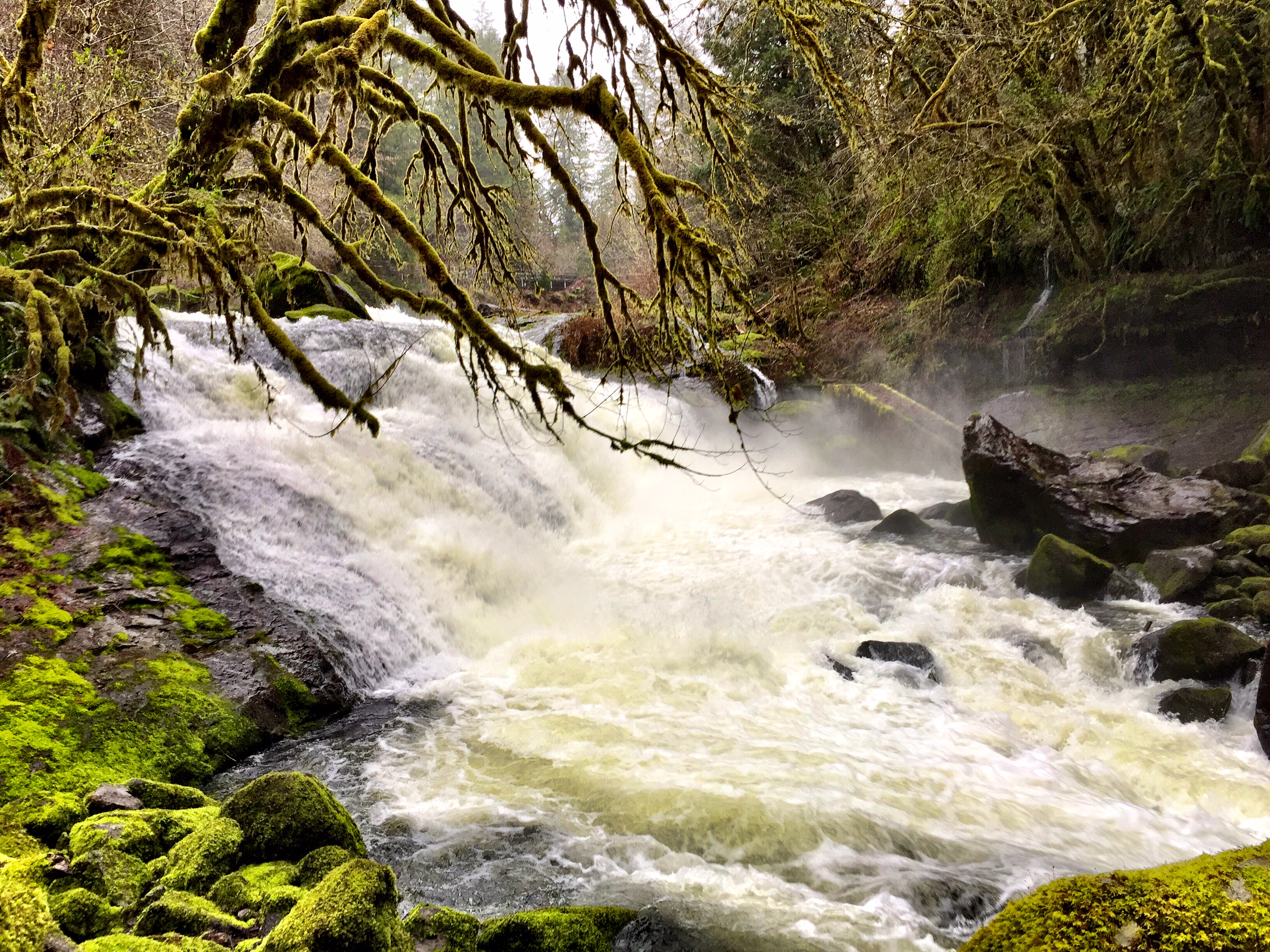
Lake Creek Falls

== Climate ==
This region experiences warm (but not hot) and dry summers, with no average monthly temperatures above 71.6 °F. According to the Köppen Climate Classification system, Lake Creek has a warm-summer Mediterranean climate, abbreviated "Csb" on climate maps.
