= Wahkeena Falls =

Waterfall in Oregon, U.S.

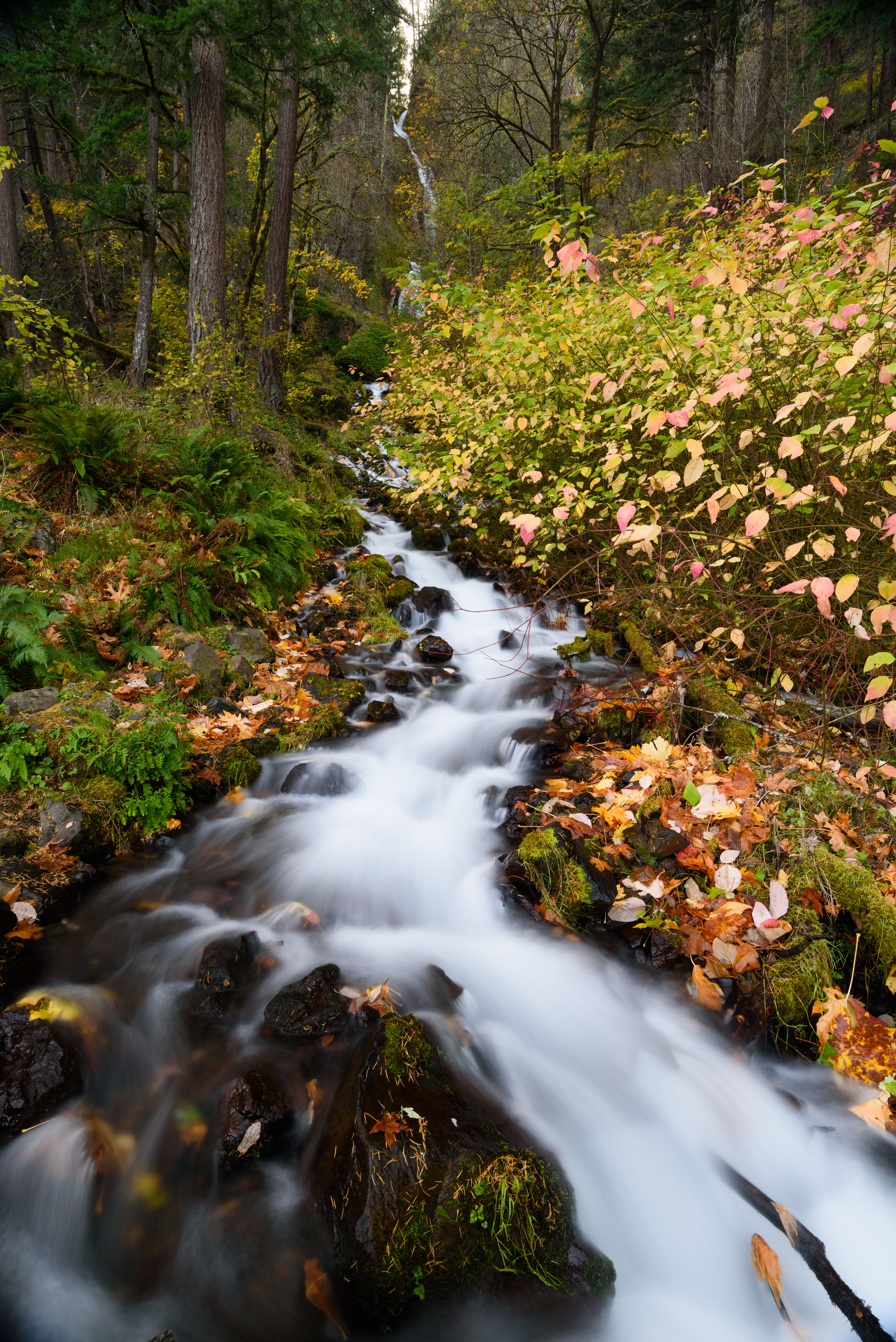
- Wahkeena Falls
- Interactive map of Wahkeena Falls
- Location: Multnomah Falls, Oregon
- Coordinates: 45.5745°N 122.1276°W
- Type: Tiered
- Elevation: 560 feet (170 m)
- Total height: 242 feet (74 m)
- Number of drops: 6

Wahkeena Falls is a 242-foot (74 m) waterfall in the Columbia River Gorge in the state of Oregon.

The waterfall is unlike nearby Multnomah Falls in that the water does not directly plunge to the ground. Wahkeena Falls, rather, has a more subtle cascading flow. These falls have been featured in numerous travel guides and in photography books.

Spellings of this name are dubious because the word is an English transliteration of a Native American (reportedly Yakama) phrase meaning most beautiful.

Wahkeena Falls is along the Historic Columbia River Highway, about 13 miles (21 km) east of Troutdale, Oregon. A 0.2-mile (320 m) hike from the parking lot at the base leads to the stone bridge that crosses the main part of the falls. That trail continues on east to Multnomah Falls, the next falls to the east. This waterfall is visible directly from the Historic Columbia River Highway.

The Wahkeena Creek Bridge, an 18-foot-long (5.5 m) bridge having "a simple reinforced-concrete slab span", below the falls, is a contributing structure in the Historic Columbia River Highway, which was listed on the National Register of Historic Places in 1983, and was further designated a National Historic Landmark District in 2000.

== Gallery ==
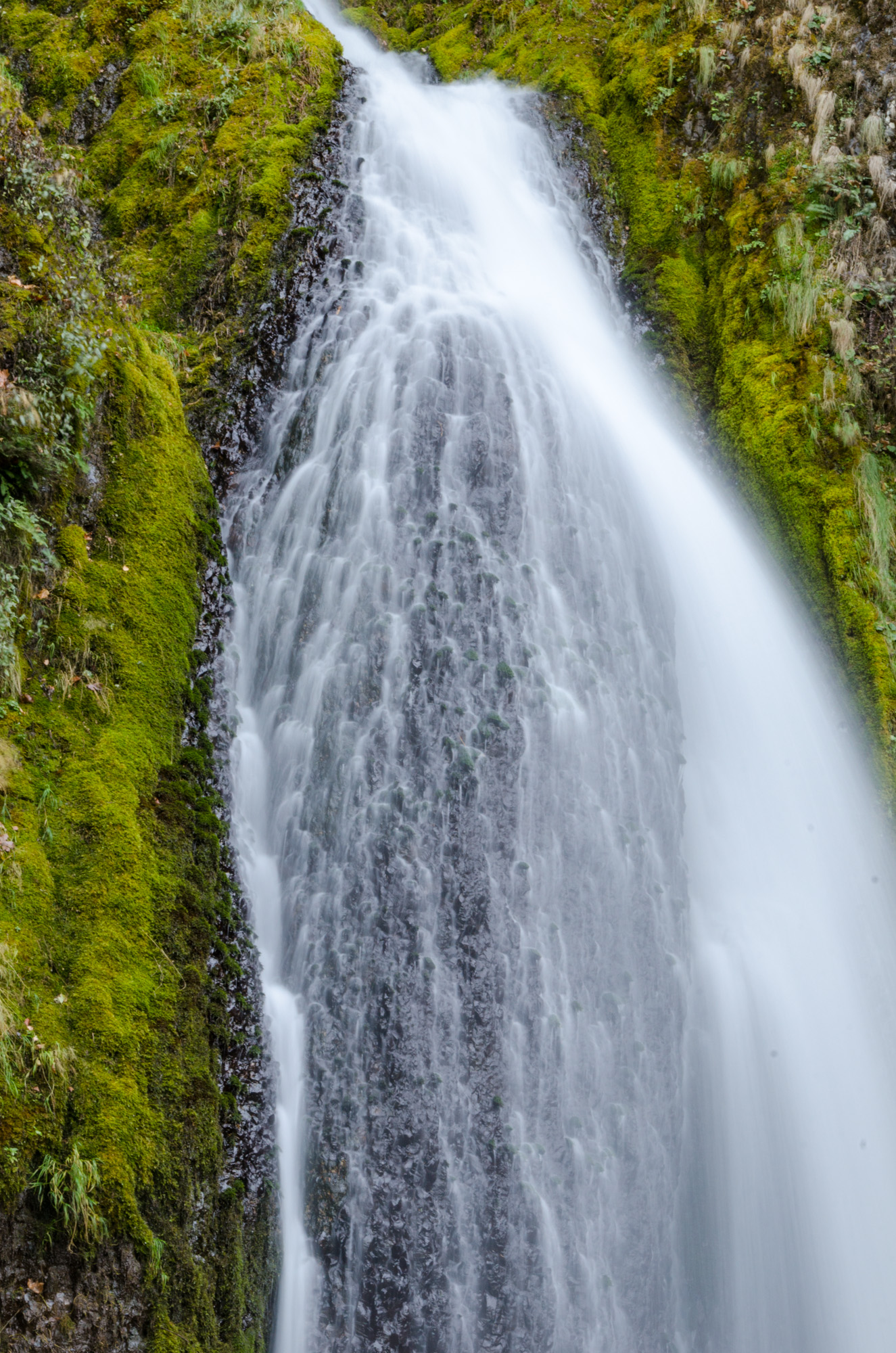
October 2012.

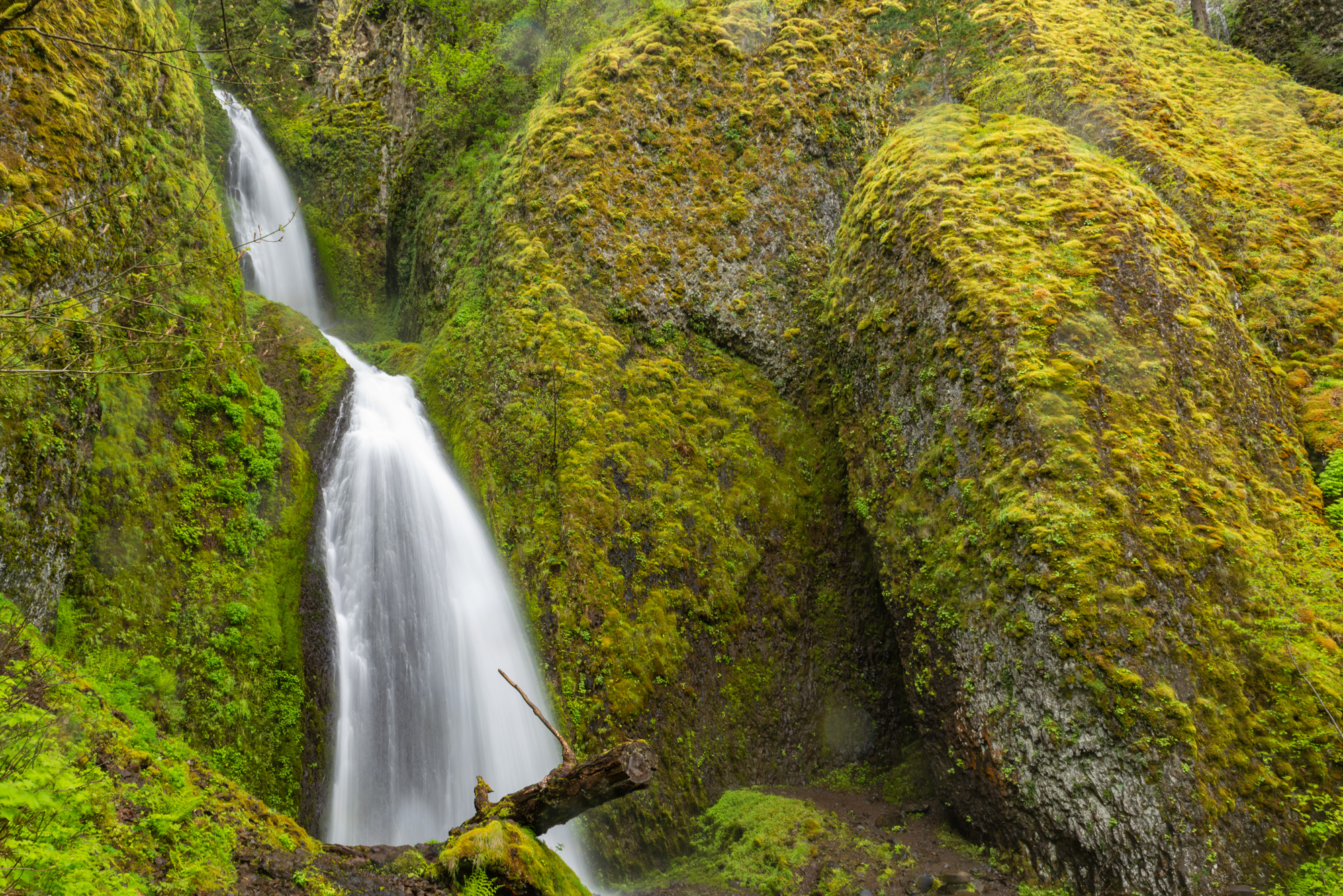
May 2017.

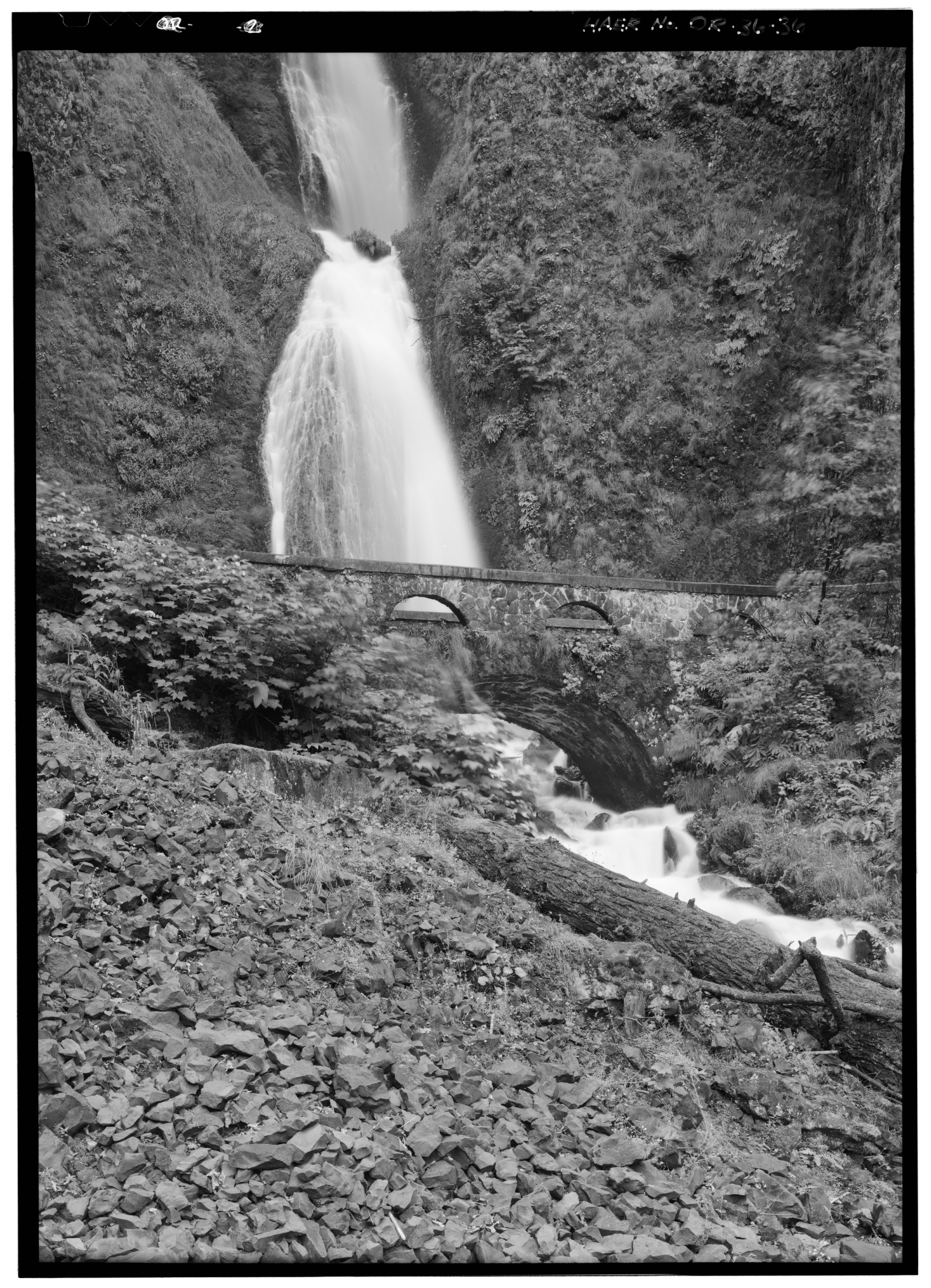
Wahkeena Falls Footbridge.

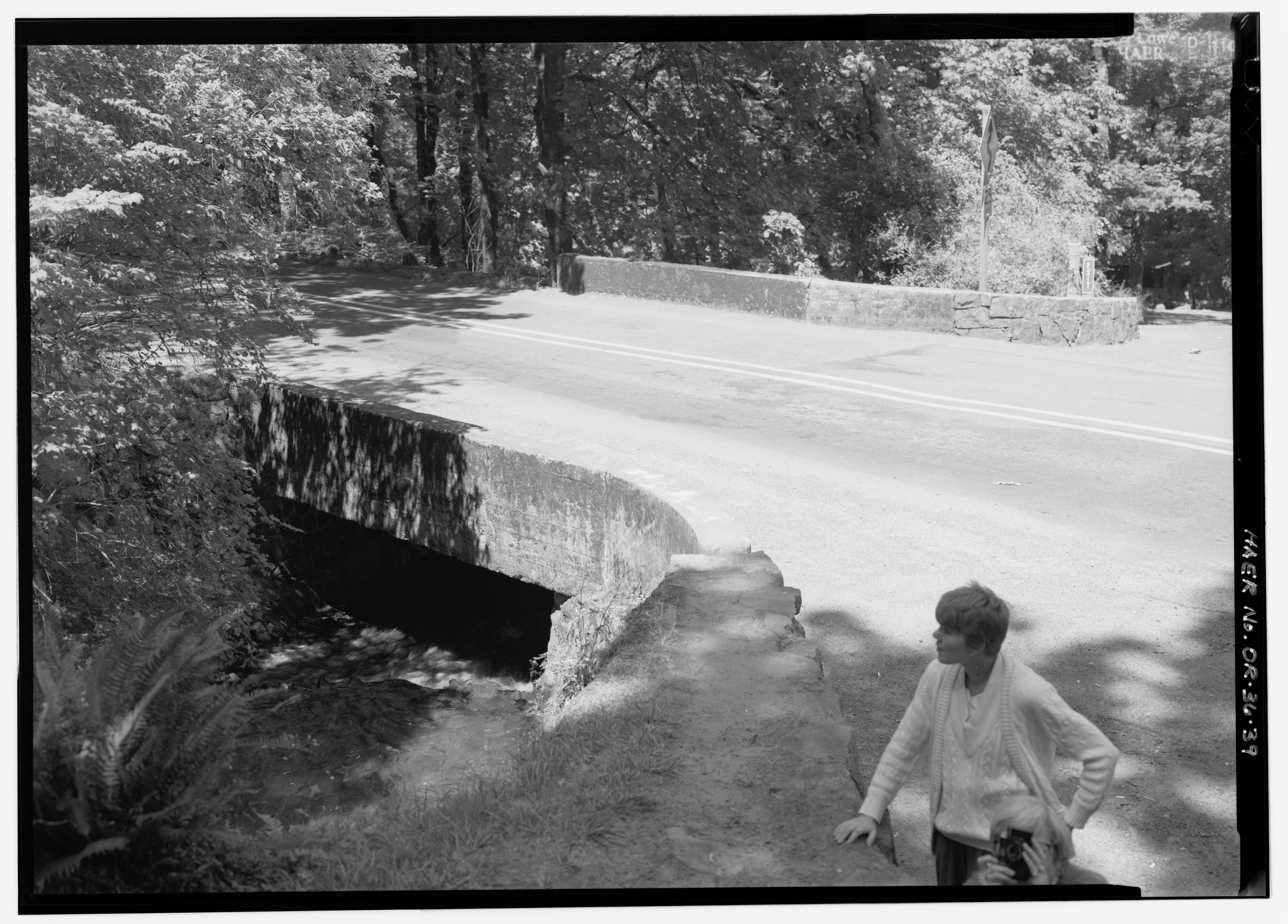
Wahkeena Falls Bridge on the Historic Columbia River Highway.

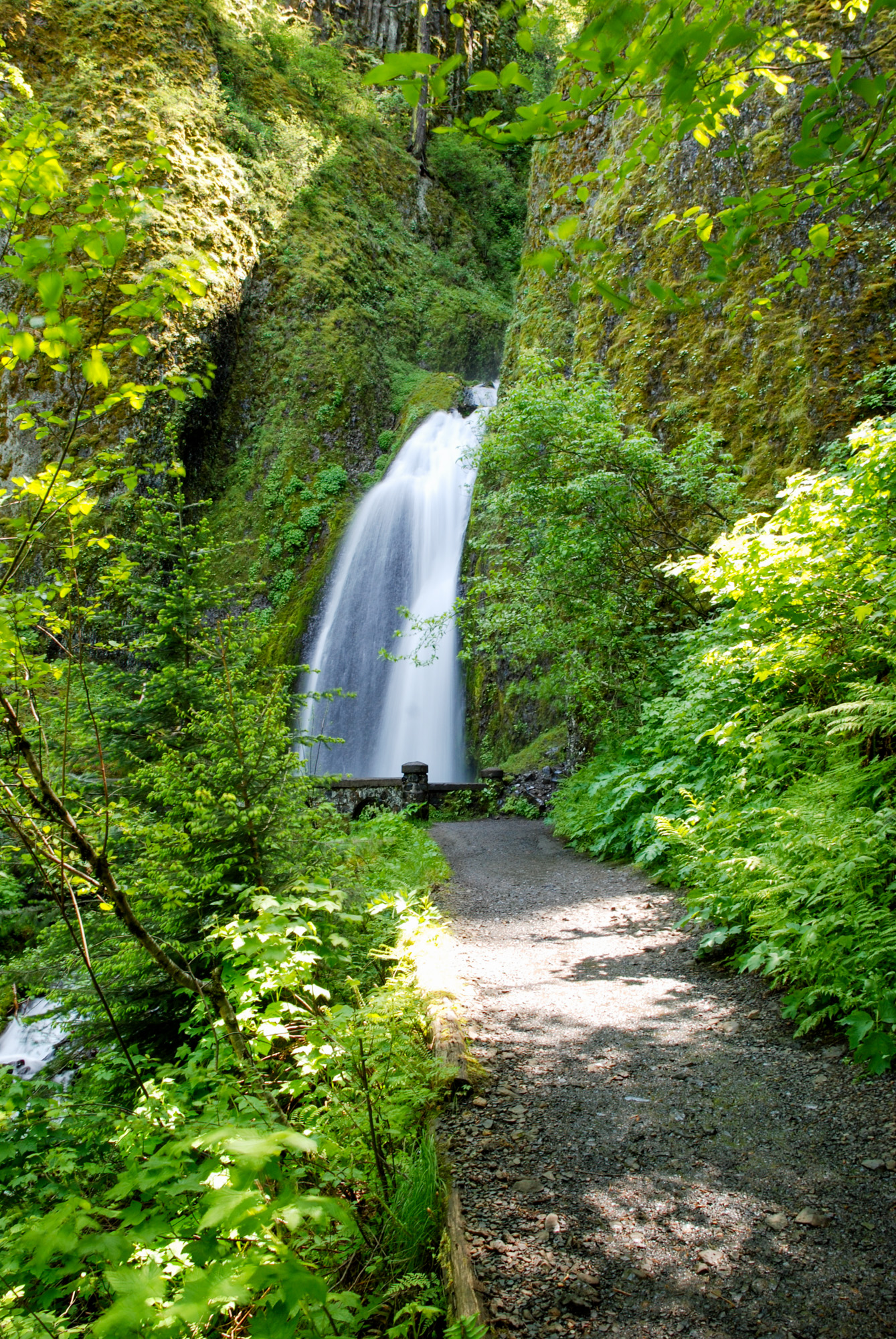
Showing path to viewing area & bridge, 2009.

== See also ==
- List of bridges documented by the Historic American Engineering Record in Oregon
- List of bridges on the National Register of Historic Places in Oregon
