= Thomas Branch (disambiguation) =

Thomas Branch (fl. 1738–1753) was an English author.

Thomas Branch may also refer to:

- Thomas H. Branch (1857–1924), American missionary
- Thomas Branch (Missouri River tributary), a stream in Missouri
- Thomas Branch (Tiger Fork tributary), a stream in Missouri
