= Tom Creek =

Canadian watercourse

Coordinates: 55°36′51″N 125°38′56″W

Tom Creek is a creek located in the Omineca Country region of British Columbia. The creek flows into Kenny Creek. Tom Creek was discovered in 1869 by the Byrnes Party. The creek yielded gold for more than one hundred years. This creek has been mined for silver and gold using wing-damming and hand-mining by Europeans and Chinese miners.
