= Thomas Creek (Oregon) =

Oregon has at least 19 features named Thomas Creek:

name	type	elevation	coordinate	USGS Map	GNIS ID
East Branch Thomas Creek (Lake County, Oregon)	Stream	4,718 ft (1,438 m)	42°08′38″N 120°22′31″W	Lakeview	1141507
Hannah Bridge (Linn County, Oregon)	Bridge	440 ft (130 m)	44°42′43″N 122°43′06″W	Jordan	1134078 Also called Thomas Creek Bridge
Jordan Bridge (Linn County, Oregon)	Bridge	466 ft (142 m)	44°47′51″N 122°46′01″W	Stayton	1955638 Also called Thomas Creek Bridge
Thomas Creek (Lane County, Oregon)	Stream	925 ft (282 m)	44°07′18″N 122°47′20″W	Walterville	1128018
Thomas Creek (Washington County, Oregon)	Stream	364 ft (111 m)	45°33′58″N 123°14′18″W	Gales Creek	1128019
Thomas Creek (Malheur County, Oregon)	Stream	4,442 ft (1,354 m)	43°06′12″N 117°07′54″W	Downey Canyon	1128020
Thomas Creek (Clackamas County, Oregon)	Stream	161 ft (49 m)	45°07′13″N 122°38′19″W	Scotts Mills	1128021
Thomas Creek (Tillamook County, Oregon)	Stream	112 ft (34 m)	45°31′29″N 123°48′29″W	Kilchis River	1132176
Thomas Creek (Curry County, Oregon)	Stream	0 ft (0 m)	42°09′57″N 124°21′47″W	Carpenterville	1151074Crossed by Thomas Creek Bridge in Samuel H. Boardman State Scenic Corridor
Thomas Creek (Lake County, Oregon)	Stream	4,705 ft (1,434 m)	42°05′17″N 120°24′44″W	West Side	1151075
Thomas Creek (Umatilla County, Oregon)	Stream	2,595 ft (791 m)	45°41′15″N 118°12′16″W	Bingham Springs	1151076
Thomas Creek (Linn County, Oregon)	Stream	230 ft (70 m)	44°40′39″N 122°58′19″W	Crabtree	1163301
Thomas Creek Basin (Oregon)	Basin	5,384 ft (1,641 m)	43°10′40″N 117°07′02″W	Sheaville	1128022
Thomas Creek Bridge	Bridge	26 ft (7.9 m)	42°09′57″N 124°21′32″W	Carpenterville	1955563
Weddle Covered Bridge	Bridge	686 ft (209 m)	44°34′38″N 122°43′31″W	Lacomb	1955642 Also called Thomas Creek Bridge and Devaney Bridge

== See also ==
- List of rivers of Oregon
