= Hadleyville, Oregon =

Unincorporated community in Oregon, United States

Coordinates: 43°58′12″N 123°19′09″W

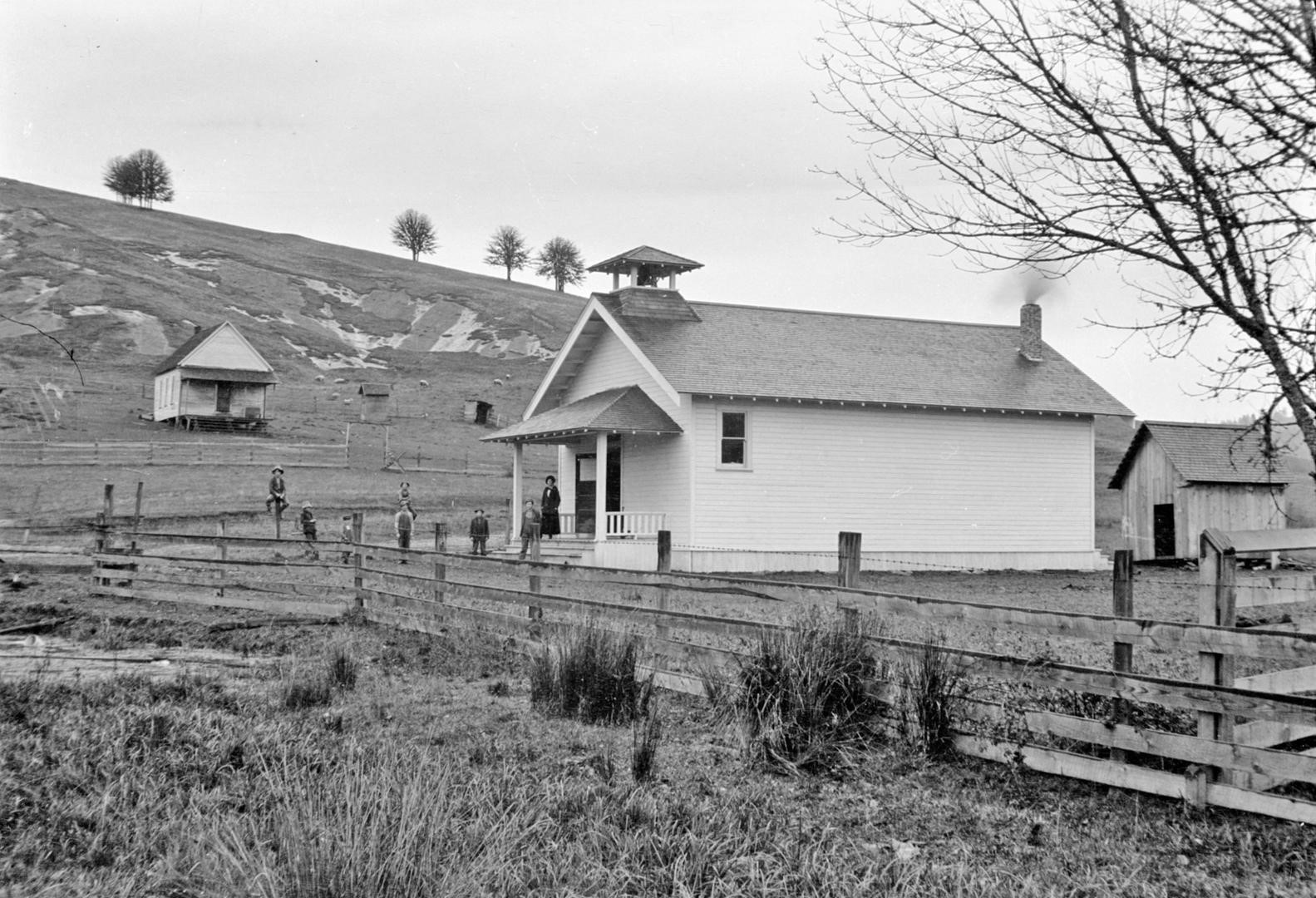
Students and teacher stand outside of the Hadleyville School, circa 1906

Hadleyville is an unincorporated community in Lane County, Oregon, United States. It is located about two miles southeast of Crow along Territorial Highway, near Coyote Creek.

Hadleyville was named for the Hadley family, including Oregon Trail pioneer Henry G. Hadley, who was a member of the 1853 Oregon Territorial Legislature and the first justice of the peace for Lane County. The Hadleys arrived in the Oregon Territory in 1851. Hadley had lived in the Spencer Creek area of Lane County, arriving in what came be known as Hadleyville in 1878.

Hadleyville post office was established in 1890, with Henry Hadley's son Frank Hadley as the first postmaster. After three more postmasters, the office closed in 1903, when mail was handled by the Crow office. The H.G. Hadley House, which once served as the Hadleyville post office, is still standing about three miles south of the modern coordinates for the community. In 1915, the area's agriculture activities included general farming, orchards, timber, dairy cattle, and other livestock. The nearest rail line was in Veneta.

At one time Hadleyville had a school located on Briggs Hill Road, and a church. The church was called the Centralview Church of Christ. The historic McCulloch Cemetery off Briggs Hill Road holds the graves of early Hadleyville residents.

== See also ==
- Brattain–Hadley House, formerly NRHP-listed house owned by H.G. Hadley's nephew
- Coyote Creek Bridge, a nearby NRHP-listed covered bridge
