= Coyote Creek (Long Tom River tributary) =

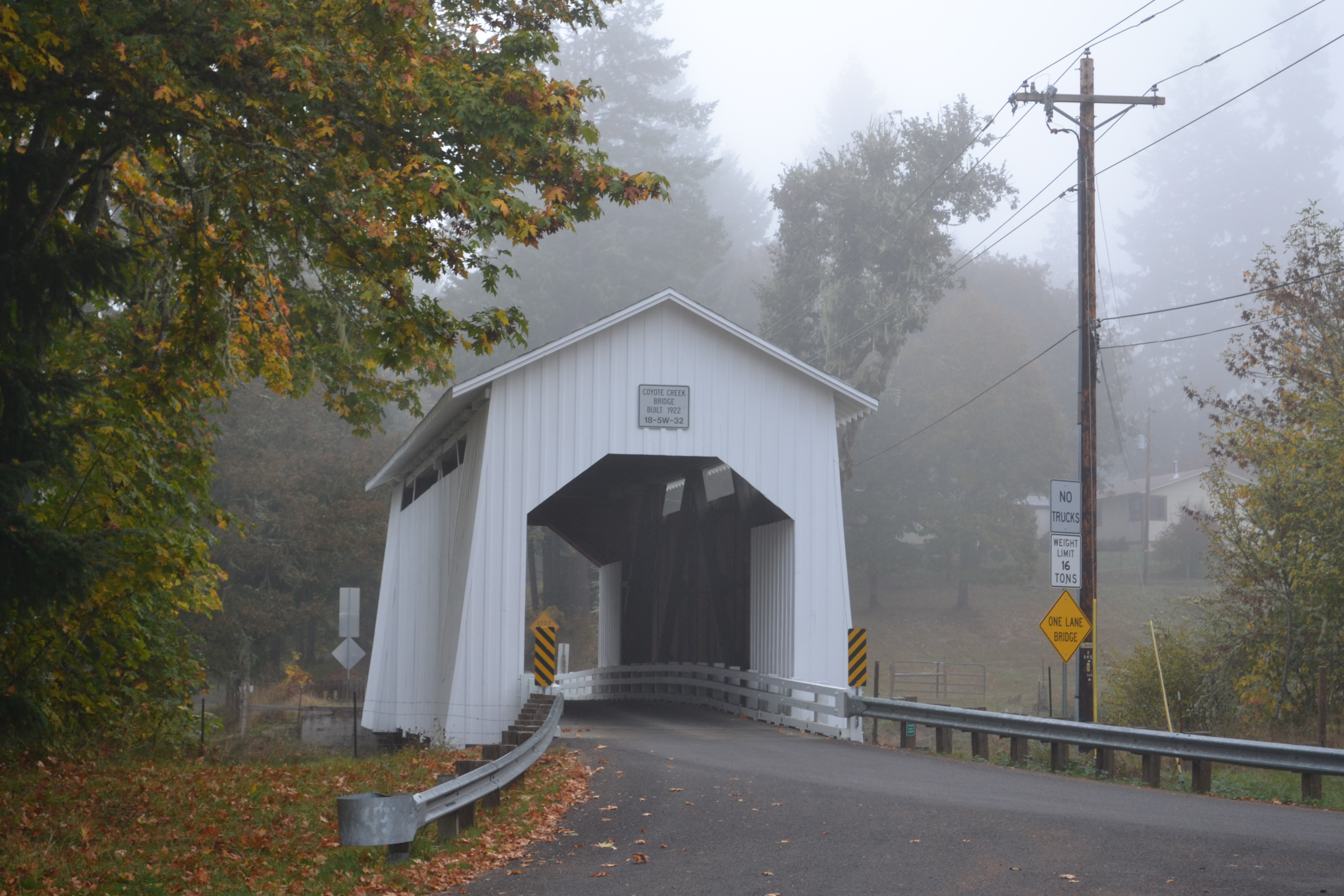
- Coyote Creek Bridge carries Battle Creek Road over the stream near Crow.

- Location of the mouth of Coyote Creek in Oregon

Location
- Country: United States
- State: Oregon
- County: Lane

Physical characteristics
- Source: Hills south of Eugene
  - location: near Gillespie Corners
  - coordinates: 43°54′41″N 123°10′37″W
  - elevation: 980 ft (300 m)
- Mouth: Long Tom River
  - location: Fern Ridge Reservoir
  - coordinates: 44°03′26″N 123°16′28″W
  - elevation: 377 ft (115 m)

Coyote Creek is a tributary of the Long Tom River via Fern Ridge Reservoir in Lane County in the U.S. state of Oregon. Beginning in hills south of Eugene, it meanders generally north through Gillespie Corners and Crow before entering the reservoir east of Veneta.

Slightly upstream of Crow, the creek flows under Coyote Creek Bridge. The covered bridge, on the National Register of Historic Places since 1979, carries Battle Creek Road over the water.

The creek's named tributaries from source to mouth are Rebel, Jackson, and Doak creeks followed by Fox Hollow. Then come Bear, Beaver, and Powell creeks followed by Hayes Branch. Further downstream are Jordan, Nighswander, Battle, Sturtevant, and Spencer creeks.

== See also ==
- List of rivers of Oregon
