= Oregon Country Fair =

Art and music fair in Oregon, United States

Coordinates: 44°3′20.48″N 123°22′22.51″W

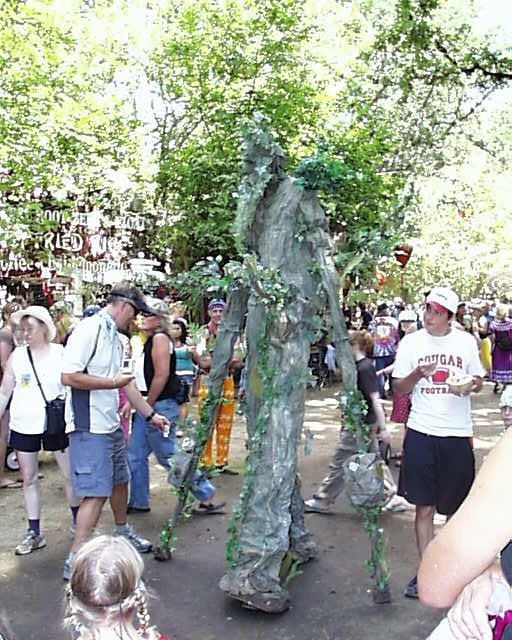
- A stiltwalker costumed as an Ent at the 2007 fair
- Begins: The Friday before the second full weekend in July
- Ends: Sunday, 2 days later
- Locations: Veneta, Oregon, U.S.
- Inaugurated: 1969

The Oregon Country Fair (OCF) is a nonprofit organization and an annual three-day art and music fair held outside the city limits of Veneta, Oregon, United States. Located in the Willamette Valley, the site is about 13 miles (21 km) west of Eugene along the Long Tom River near the unincorporated community of Elmira. Annual attendance is approximately 35,000, and the fair has around 960 craft and food booths each year. The event is known as an outgrowth of the counter-culture movement and for using environmentally-friendly practices during the fair.

The Oregon Country Fair begins on the Friday of the second weekend in July every year (i.e. as early as July 7 and as late as July 13). The fair is a non-profit organization and as such has a board of directors. Additionally, the management structure of the Oregon Country Fair is typically composed of an Executive Director, an Operations Manager, a Site and Facilities Manager, and a team of volunteer Back Up Managers, otherwise known as BUMS, who serve as representation for the fair's paid management staff for the duration of the event.

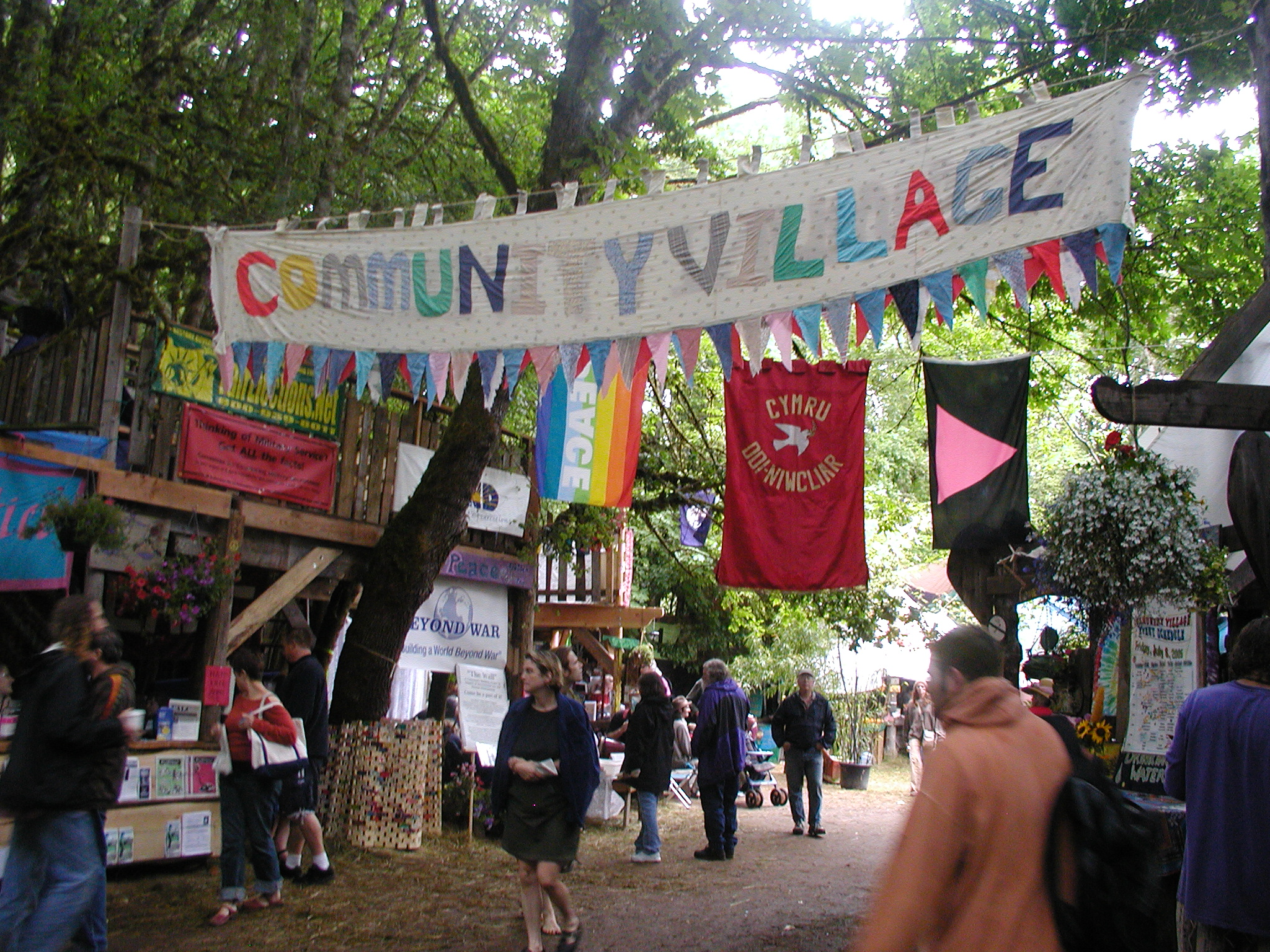
Community Village, 2005 Fair

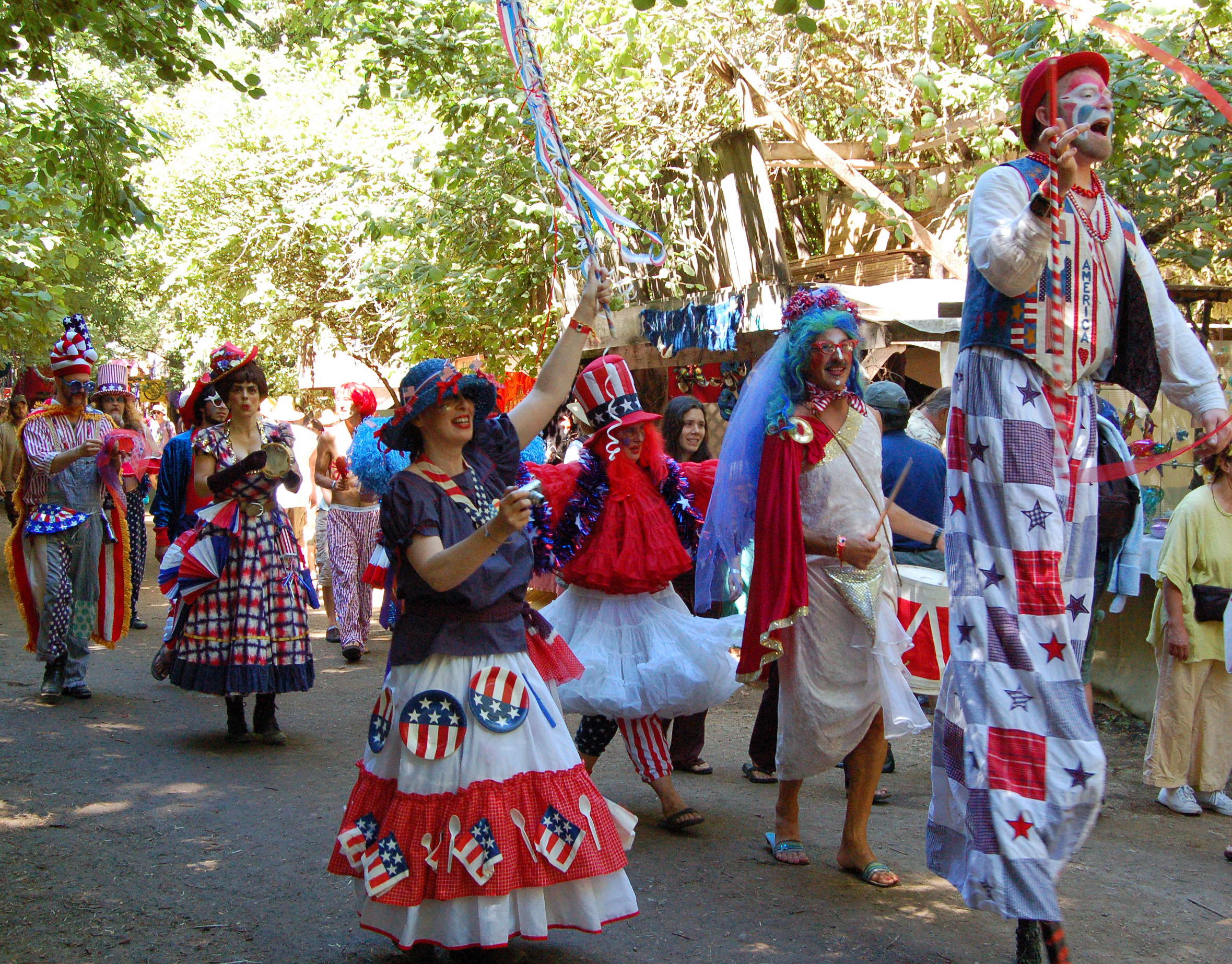
Patriotic paraders, 2008

== History ==
The first fair, organized by Ron and Robin Ulrich, was held in Eugene over the weekend of November 1–2, 1969, on Eugene's Hawkins Heights. It was promoted with the tagline, "come in costume". The fair began as a craft fair to raise funds for an alternative school, the Children's Community School. The event moved to its current location in Veneta, about 13 miles west of Eugene, for the fall fair in October, 1970, after having had a May Fair the same year on Crow Road about halfway between Eugene and Veneta.

In August 1972 and August 1982, OCF hosted concerts headlined by the Grateful Dead. Known as "Field Trips", the first concert was held as a benefit for the Springfield Creamery, which is owned by members of Ken Kesey's family.

Until 1977, the fair was known as the Oregon Renaissance Faire.

Due to the COVID-19 pandemic, a virtual fair in the cloud(s) was held in 2020, and 2021. The in-person fair resumed in 2022.

== Entertainment ==
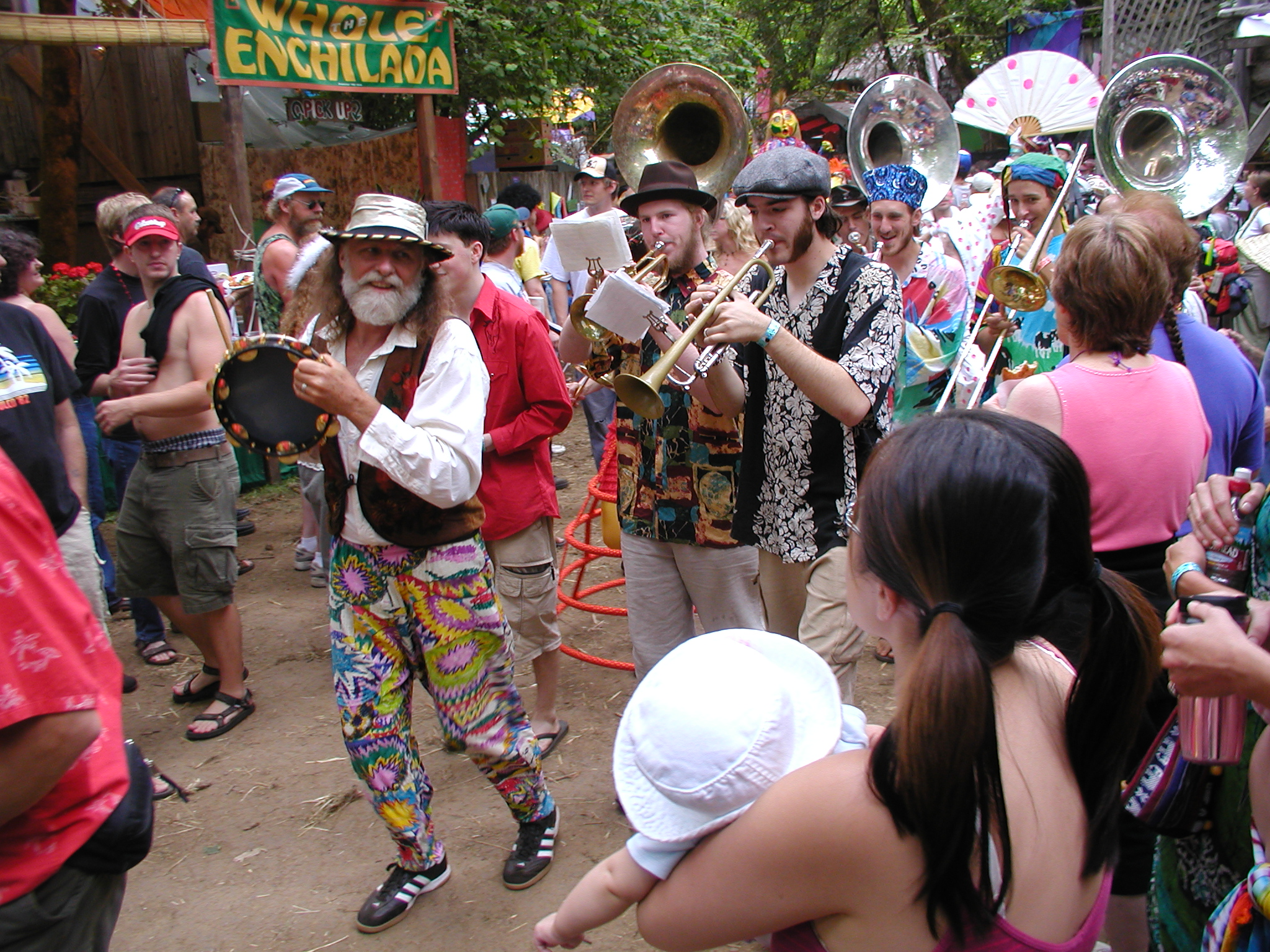
The Fighting Instruments of Karma Marching Band lead a parade at the 2005 Fair

During open hours (11 am to 7 pm) there are 22 stages featuring a wide variety of musical, comedic, theatrical, juggling, daredevil, and vaudeville performances.

The stages are: Main Stage, DuCaniveaux Stage, Kesey Stage, Caravan Stage, W.C. Fields Stage, Dance Pavilion, Flow Zone, WorkItShop, Spirit Tower, Rabbit Hole, Front Porch, Blue Moon Stage, Stage Left, Chez Ray's Next Stage, Monkey Palace, Might Tiny Puppet Stage, Hoarse Chorale, Morningwood Odditorium, Community Village, and Youth Stage. The Ritz, which has showering facilities and two saunas, also includes a stage.

Musical acts incorporate many styles, including: folk, rock, jazz, blues, bluegrass, Latin, reggae, slam poetry and spoken word. There are also numerous musicians engaged in busking along the pathways as well as parades and walking performers throughout the entire fair site, including a marching band, giant puppets, and stilt walkers.

There is also a drum circle at the Drum Tower which is open to all willing participants who bring their musical instruments.

== Tickets and transportation ==
Tickets and passes are required to attend the Oregon Country Fair. All tickets are sold in advance at TicketsWest outlets and other retail centers throughout the Northwest. All tickets must be purchased off-site; no tickets are sold at the fair site. Discount tickets are available for people who qualify for disability or senior discounts. There is no fee for children who are under the age of twelve and come with a paying adult. Public transportation, in the form of bus shuttle, provides a park and ride service between Eugene and the OCF grounds non-stop throughout the days of the fair.

== Culture ==
The fair is a family event with face painting, puppet shows, and music for children. Toplessness is permitted while full nudity is not allowed during public hours in public areas. No alcohol is allowed, and smoking is limited to designated areas. All glass bottles are banned from the fairgrounds in an attempt to protect the safety of shoeless fairgoers, and to preserve the integrity of the land. The fair has its own water and communications systems, recycling service, emergency medical team, traffic control, and security team. Since 1997 there has been a strong effort to make it a drug-free event.

== Infrastructure ==
The fair is a 501(c)(3) non-profit organization. It is governed by an elected twelve-member board of directors. There are eleven staff positions within the organization. Staff positions include an Executive Director, two Event Managers, a Marketing Manager, a Site and Facilities Manager, an Office Manager, Residential Caretaker, two Groundskeepers, and an Administrative Assistant.

Alter-abled access is available at the Oregon Country Fair, including wheelchairs (there is a battery re-charging station for electric wheelchairs), helpers, sign language interpreters, folding chairs, rest areas, maps, and other information. To obtain these services, or more information about them, event participants can go to the following locations on the event site: the Alter-Abled Access Advocates(4A)Center (located near Admissions as well as at the Bus Stop), Community Village, Solutions, and all Information booths.

From June 1 through August 31 there are no dogs (except service dogs) allowed on the event site.

Publications

The Oregon Country Fair publishes a newsletter, the Fair Family News, eleven times a year, as well as an event paper, the Peach Pit, once a year for the three-day event.

== Volunteer crews ==
The Oregon Country Fair has a large volunteer network. This volunteer network is the base for all operational needs of the event. Volunteer crews are separated into "Pre-fair Crews" and "During Fair Crews." Pre-fair crews work from the site's opening in early June until the event officially opens to the public on the second weekend in July. Pre-fair crews are responsible for setting up the site's physical infrastructure and preparing the site both for the festival and for the increase in people on the land with the aim of reducing impact and preserving natural flora and fauna. Preservation and restoration efforts are led by the Site and Facilities Manager year round, and are largely carried out by the Residential Caretaker with the help of a special crew known as Site Crew who report directly to the Caretaker and Site and Facilities Manager.

All volunteers agree to the Oregon Country Fair Guidelines and Code of Conduct. The Code of Conduct of The Oregon Country Fair is:

We are an association of equals. Each and every member of our community is entitled to respectful and equitable treatment by all other participants. We should all act responsibly towards one another wherever we gather. The OCF is committed to the principles of non-violence. Mental, verbal, physical, or sexual abuse will not be tolerated. We share reverence for the land. Stewardship is everyone's responsibility. Please help protect the plant and animal life whose space we share, and work to extend this practice beyond the OCF and into daily life.

== History of the land ==
The Willamette Valley has been continuously occupied by humans, to some extent, for at least the last 9,000–10,000 years (this timeline is based on the archaeological evidence gathered from 34 archaeological sites in the Upper Willamette Valley).

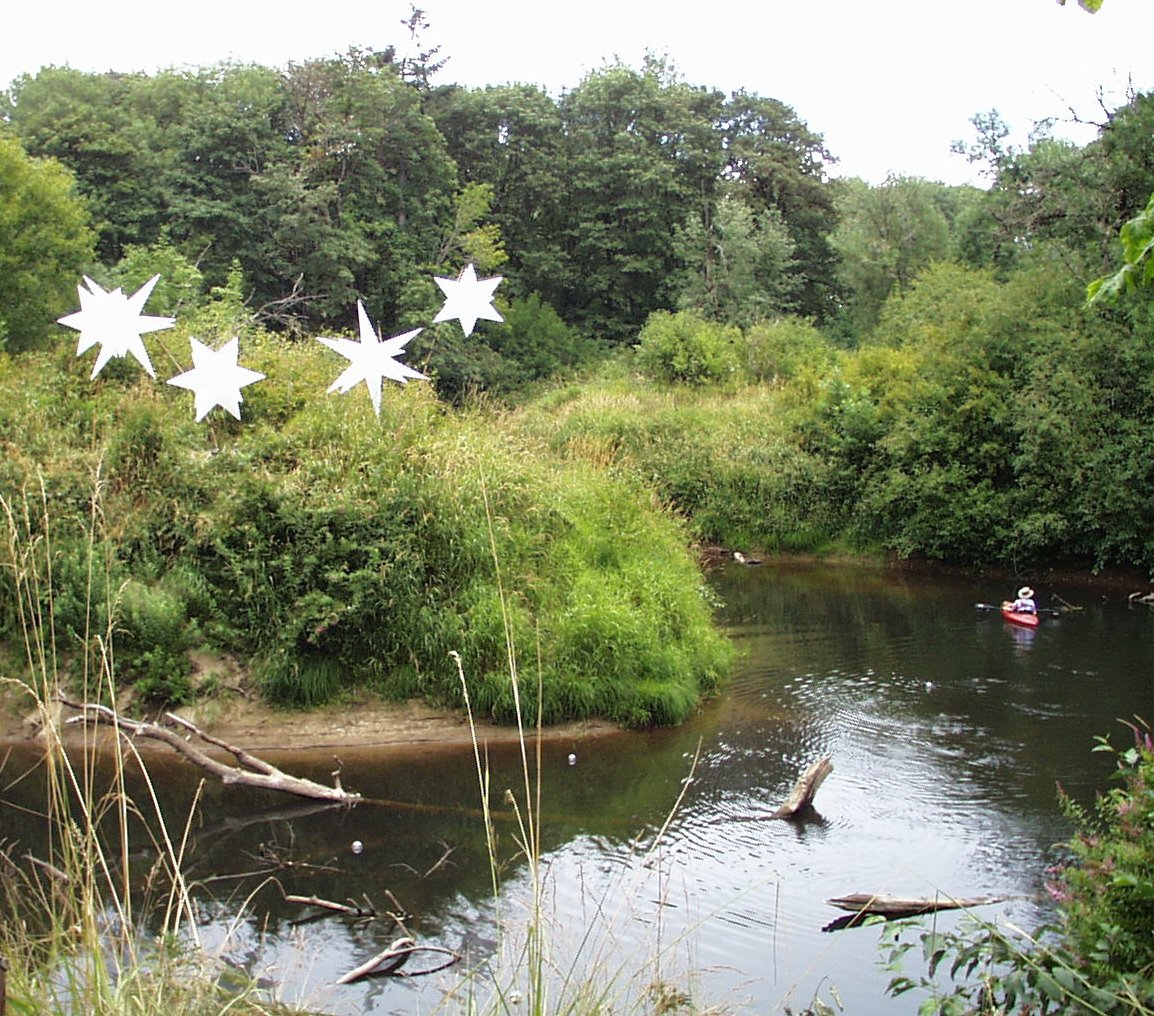
The banks of the Long Tom River decorated for the fair, as seen from the "eight" (the main path through the fair)

The Oregon Country Fair property includes archaeological sites protected by state law. It is thought to have previously been a gathering place for the Kalapuya tribe of Native Americans. All ground disturbing activities on the fair property must be approved by the archaeology and construction crews.

The Kalapuya lived in permanent winter homes and migrated throughout the Willamette Valley of Oregon during the summers. Subsistence was based on fishing, hunting, and gathering wild plant foods.

Based on the translation of Kalapuya texts, strong historical aspects of the Kalapuya culture include: the dream, the dream spirit-power, death, wealth, prestige, sexual division of labor (men hunt, women gather), sex, acculturation, and language. The dream spirit-power was observed to be the strongest. The dream power was constantly referred to in matters of courage and bravery, of sickness and resisting disease, gambling, hunting, wealth, casting spells, power over natural phenomena and becoming a shaman.

Much of the fair site is a wetland and the Long Tom River floods much of the fair property each winter.

== Educational areas ==
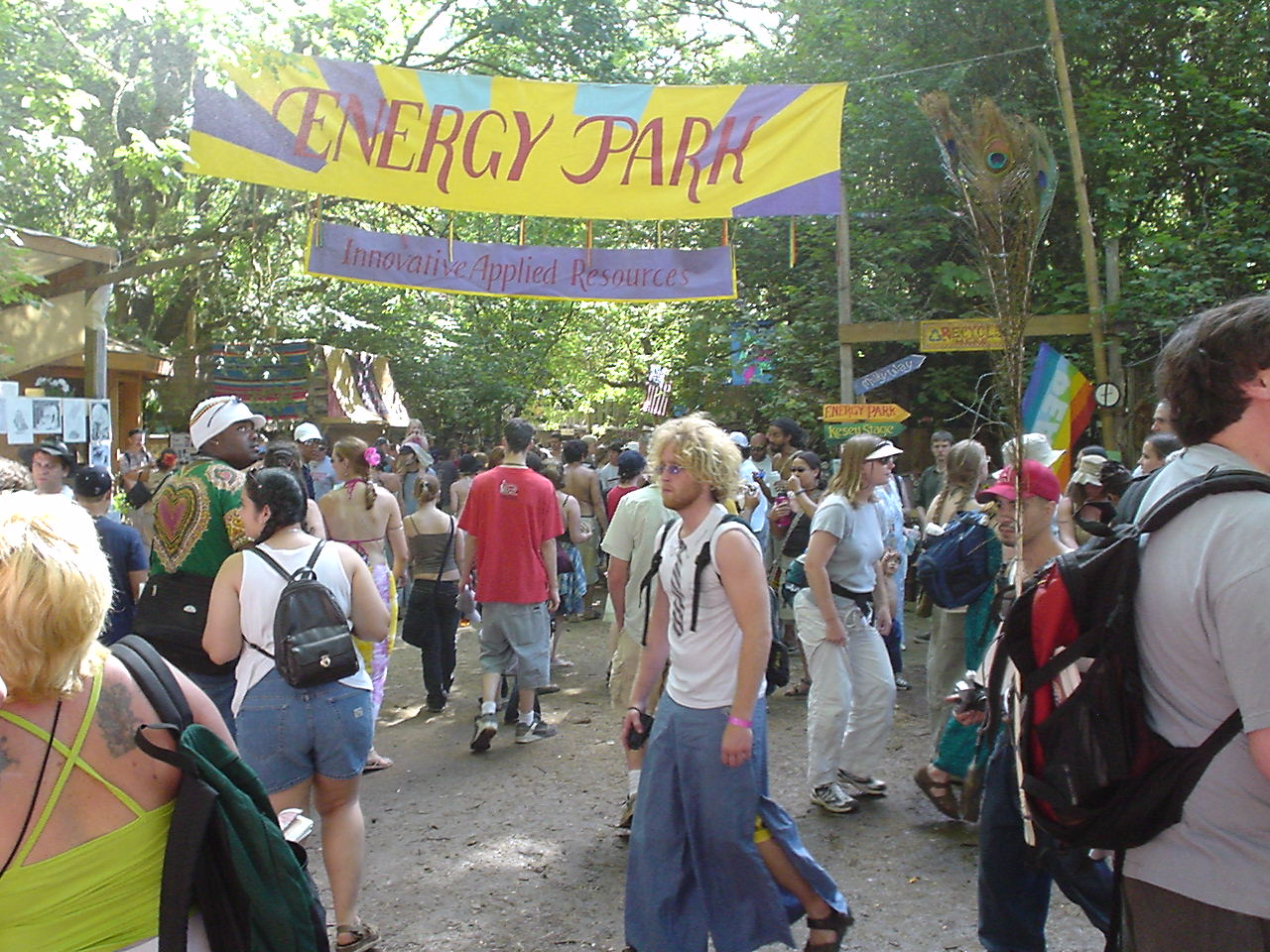
Energy Park

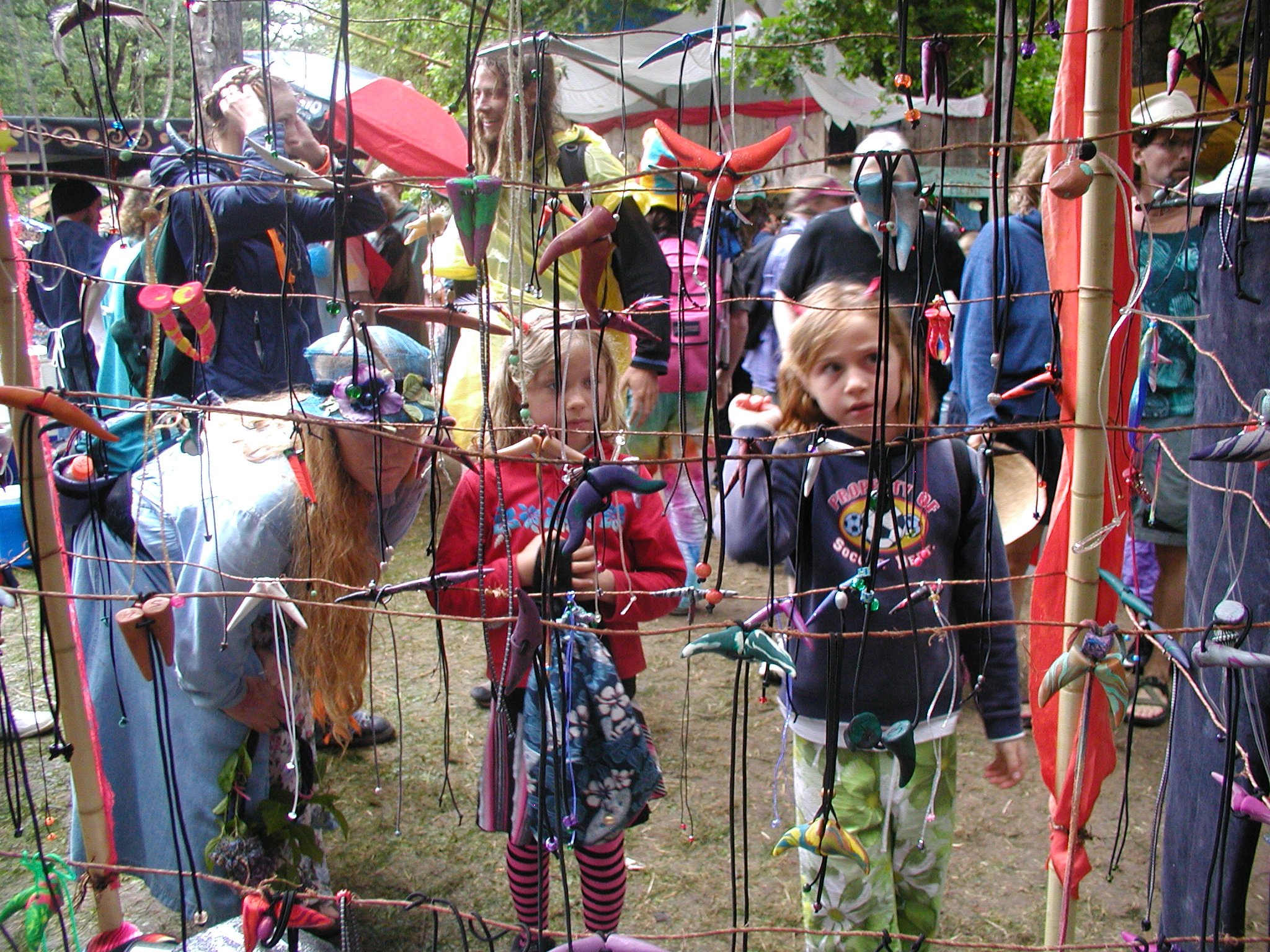
Young attendees

Some of the Oregon Country Fair's areas are organized to be information and workshop resources. The Kids Loop is a children's play area, Yes You Canopy is a pavilion dedicated to the teaching of juggling, Energy Park is an area with displays and demonstrations on alternative energy, alternative transportation, organic agriculture and recycling, and Community Village has booths from non-profit organizations dedicated to education, information access, plants and gardening, including a display by the Oregon State University/Lane County Extension Master Gardeners, and other forms of progressive social change.

Archaeology Park ("Ark Park") is the home of the fair's archaeology crew, and includes replica cedar houses like those used by Pacific Northwest Native American tribes, displays of artifacts and photos of archaeological digs from the fair site, and hands-on demonstrations of flintknapping, firemaking, basket weaving and other Native American skills.

== Philanthropy ==
The OCF organization maintains close ties with the Eugene-area community and supports many other nonprofit organizations through its philanthropic programs.

Fairgoers, fair working volunteers, and the OCF organization alike contribute to non-profit groups through The Jill Heiman Vision Fund. This fund grants funds to tax-exempt organizations in Lane County. Donations are provided to projects and programs related to improving the environment and fostering sustainability.

The OCF Board has created The Bill Wooten Endowment Fund to assist arts, environmental, and social justice projects. The Board of Directors also offers donations to various groups and activities that share its values of living artfully and authentically on the earth.

== See also ==
- List of music festivals in the United States
- Renaissance fair#History in the United States
- Sunshine Daydream
- Veneta, Oregon, 8/27/72
