= Fern Ridge =

Fern Ridge may refer to:

- Fern Ridge High School, an alternative high school located in Unincorporated St. Louis County, Missouri
- Fern Ridge Reservoir (or Fern Ridge Lake), a reservoir located near Eugene, Oregon
- Fern Ridge Wildlife Area, a wildlife management area surrounding Fern Ridge Reservoir
