= Elmira, Oregon =

Unincorporated community in the state of Oregon, United States

- Census-designated place
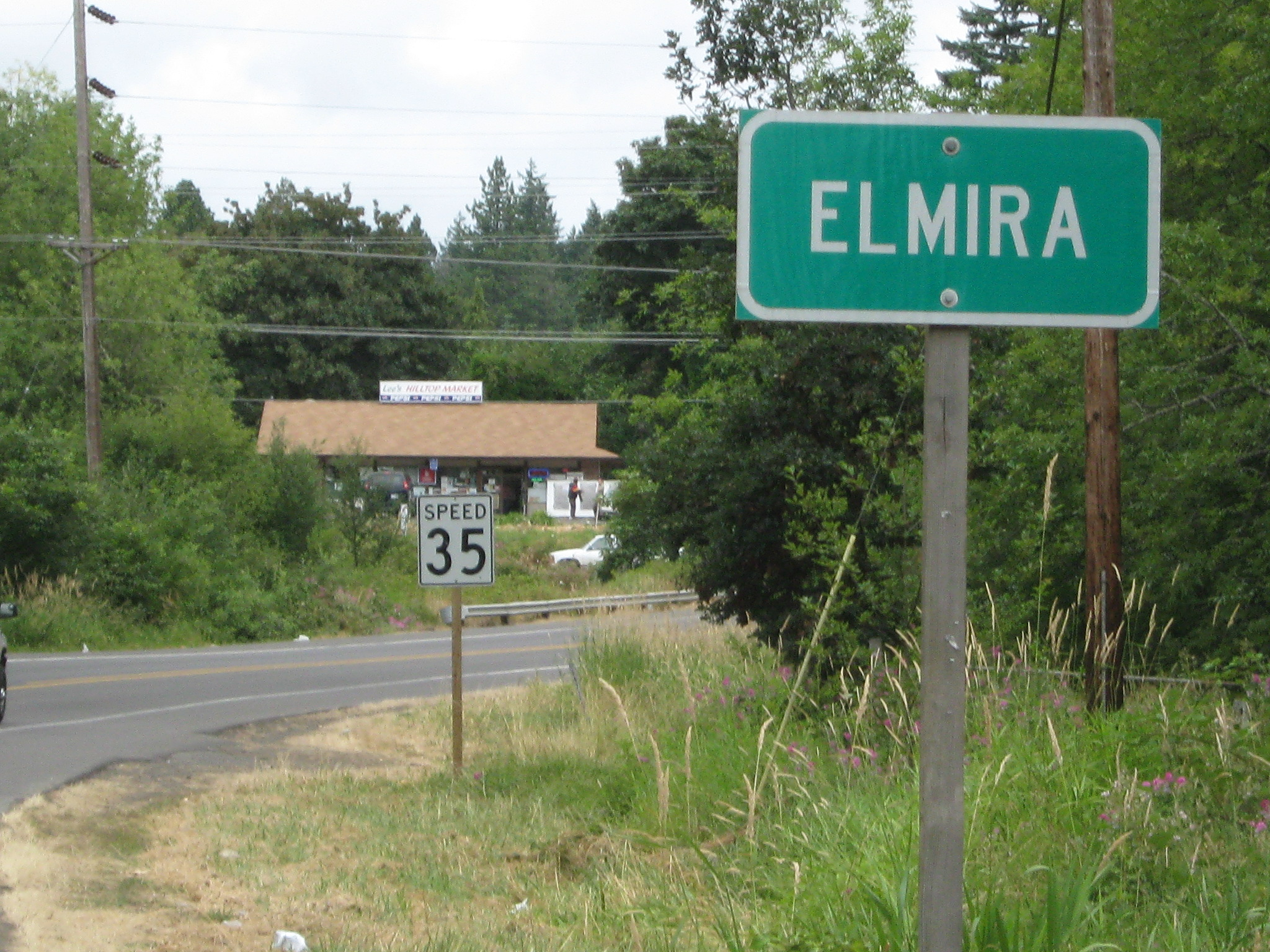
- Approaching Elmira from the south

- Location within Oregon Location within the United States
- Coordinates: 44°04′12″N 123°21′32″W
- Country: United States
- State: Oregon
- County: Lane

Area
  - Total: 1.35 sq mi (3.49 km^{2})
  - Land: 1.22 sq mi (3.17 km^{2})
  - Water: 0.12 sq mi (0.32 km^{2})
- Elevation: 407 ft (124 m)

Population (2020)
  - Total: 546
  - Density: 445.6/sq mi (172.04/km^{2})
- Time zone: UTC-8 (Pacific (PST))
  - Summer (DST): UTC-7 (PDT)
- ZIP code: 97437
- Area codes: 458 and 541
- FIPS code: 41-23000
- GNIS feature ID: 2812883

Elmira is an unincorporated community and census-designated place (CDP) in Lane County, Oregon, United States. It is located west of Eugene and north of Veneta and Oregon Route 126, near the Long Tom River and Fern Ridge Reservoir. As of the 2020 census, Elmira had a population of 546.

== History ==
The community was named after Elmira, California, after previously having the name "Duckworth". A local business owner persuaded postal authorities to rename the community "Elmira" in 1884.

In approximately 1905, Elmira Road and the surrounding area was homesteaded by Henry and Celia Faulhaber along with their children Leon, Neil and Mildred. Sometime between 1905 and 1916 Elmira Road was donated back to the county by Henry Faulhaber and later renamed Faulhaber Road.

== Education ==
Elmira is served by the Fern Ridge School District (28J), which has four traditional schools, Elmira Elementary School, Veneta Elementary School, Fern Ridge Middle School, and Elmira High School, and an online charter high school, West Lane Technical Learning Center.

== Notable residents ==
- Milt Davis (1929–2008), All Pro defensive back for the Baltimore Colts of the NFL; college professor
