= West Lane Technology Learning Center =

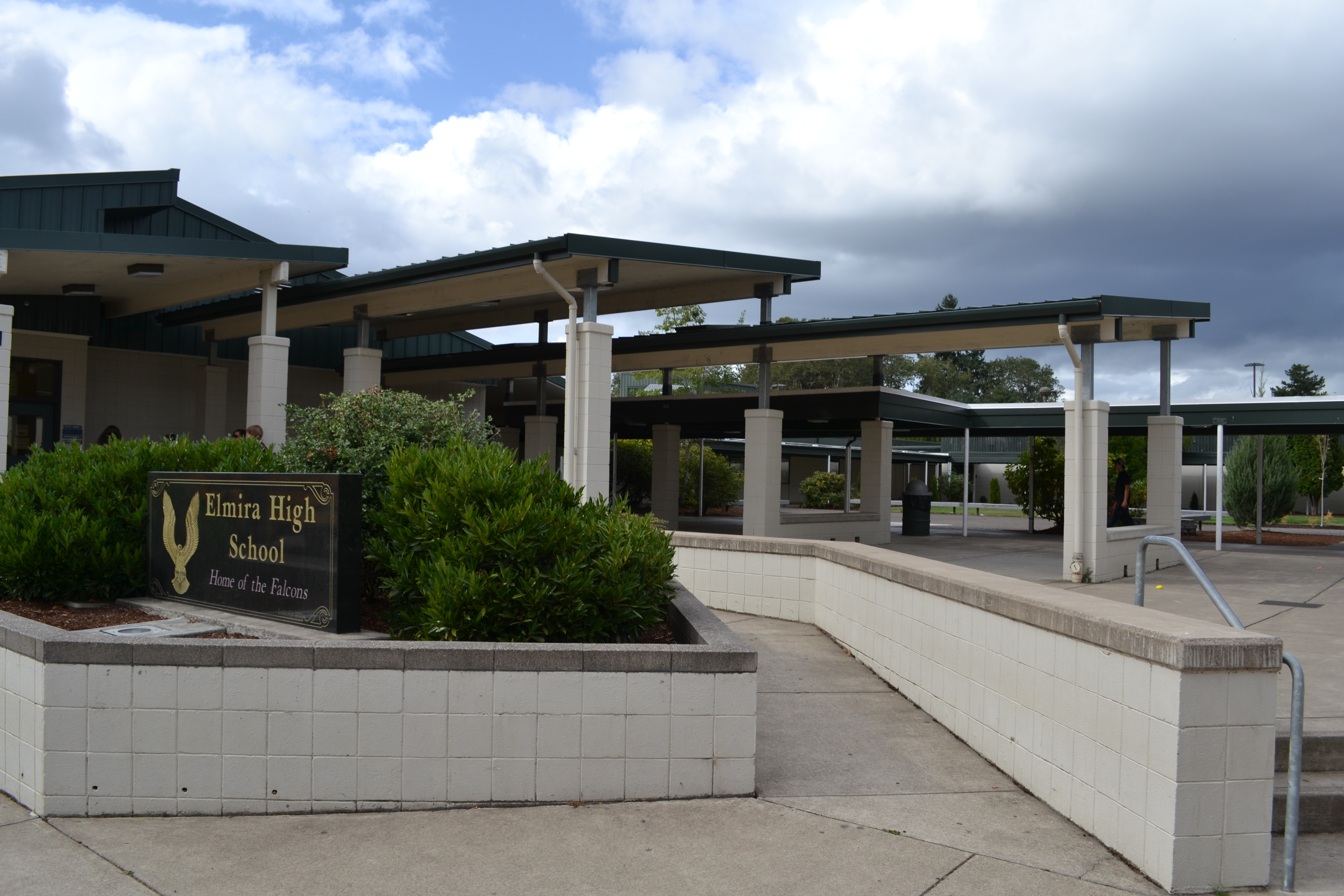

Location
- 24936 Fir Grove Lane; Elmira, Lane County, Oregon 97437; United States; 44.073352°N 123.36042°W

Information
- Type: Public
- School district: Fern Ridge School District
- Director: Ken Woody
- Grades: 9-12
- Enrollment: 76
- Website: www.westlanecharter.org

West Lane Technology Learning Center is an online charter school in Elmira, Oregon, United States. It is located on the campus of Elmira High School.

== Academics ==
In 2008, 43% of the school's seniors received their high school diploma. Of 47 students, 20 graduated, 15 dropped out, and 12 are still in high school.
