= Amazon Creek =

Stream in Eugene, Oregon, United States of America

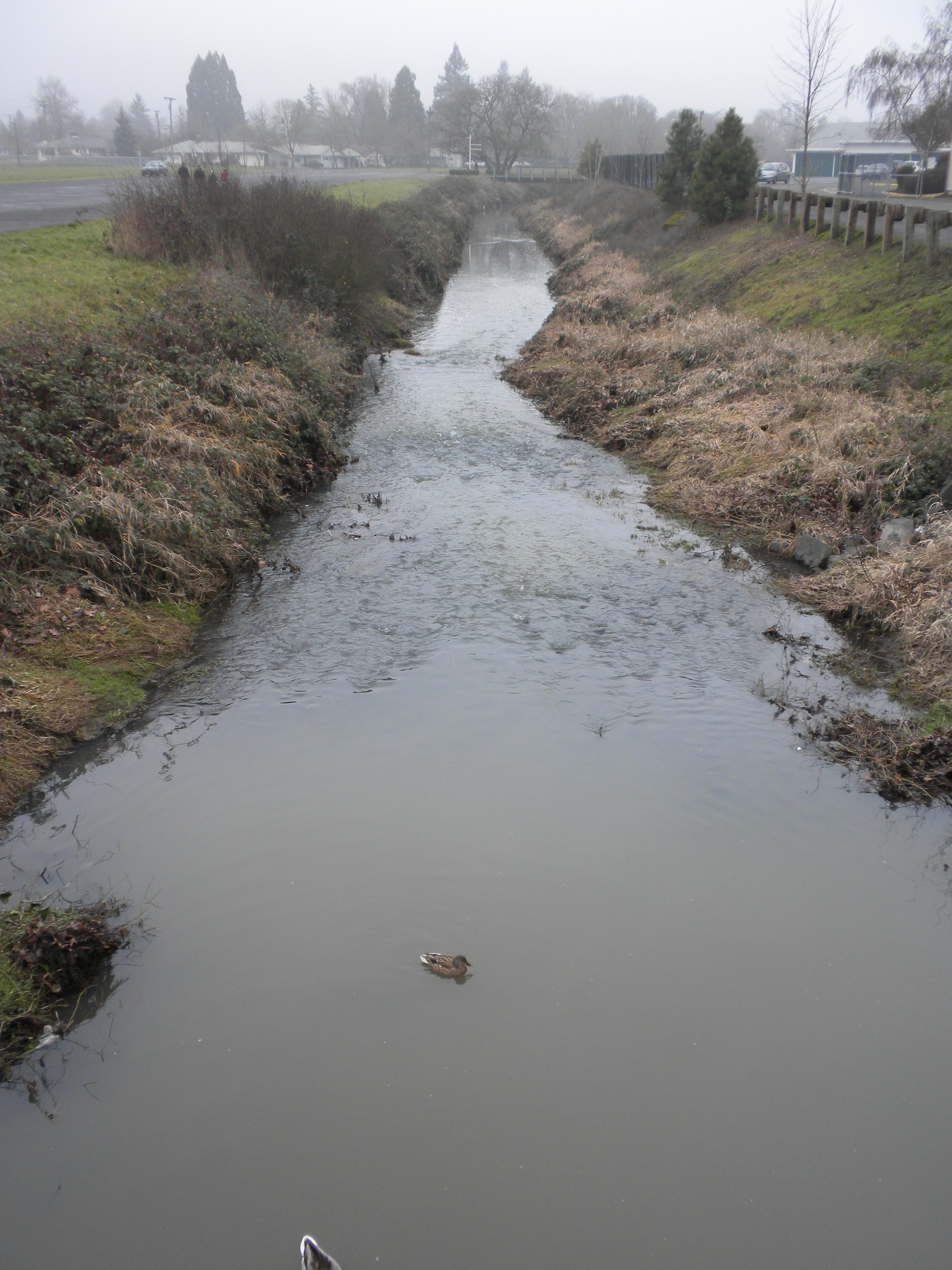
- Along the creek

- Location of the mouth of Amazon Creek in Oregon

Location
- Country: United States
- State: Oregon
- County: Lane

Physical characteristics
- Source: near Spencer Butte
  - location: Eugene
  - coordinates: 43°59′19″N 123°05′02″W
  - elevation: 1,079 ft (329 m)
- Mouth: Long Tom River
  - location: west of Junction City
  - coordinates: 44°13′39″N 123°15′49″W
  - elevation: 318 ft (97 m)

Amazon Creek is a stream that runs through southeastern and western Eugene, Oregon, United States. It is a tributary of the Long Tom River and is Eugene's second-largest waterway after the Willamette River.

== Background ==
Amazon Creek's headwaters are located in Eugene's southeast hills near Spencer Butte. The creek bed has been altered from the foot of Spencer Butte so it flows north from Martin Street through Amazon Park in a channel. At 24th Avenue it enters a 1.75 mile concrete channel. The stream travels north to 18th Avenue, turning west near High Street and continuing into the levee channel (diversion canal) near the Lane County Fairgrounds at Jefferson Street. It continues west to Fern Ridge Reservoir and the Long Tom River. It collects water from 21 square miles of urban landscapes and storm drains, providing flood control, wildlife habitat, and recreation.

In 1946, the U.S. Army Corps of Engineers widened, deepened, and realigned the creek from Hilyard Street to Fern Ridge Reservoir in a diversion canal as a means of controlling floodwaters in the area. The Amazon flood control project was completed in 1958, using a trapezoidal channel designed to withstand a 25-year flood.

The lower reach of Amazon Creek from Bailey Hill Road to the Coos Bay Rail Link (former Southern Pacific Railroad) rail line has been the subject of current restoration efforts to widen the creek and plant native species along the banks. The City of Eugene has designated Amazon Creek as a natural area, noting, "These areas support a wide diversity of plants and wildlife, including many endangered and rare species. These areas also provide valuable ecosystem services… and many other important functions that benefit our community."

== Geography ==
=== Coordinates ===
Point	Coordinate	USGS Map name
1 mouth	44.227623°N 123.263706°W	Cheshire
2	44.217068°N 123.251206°W	Junction City
3	44.124846°N 123.236482°W	Eugene West
4	44.045958°N 123.125922°W	Eugene East
5 source	43.988736°N 123.083975°W	Creswell

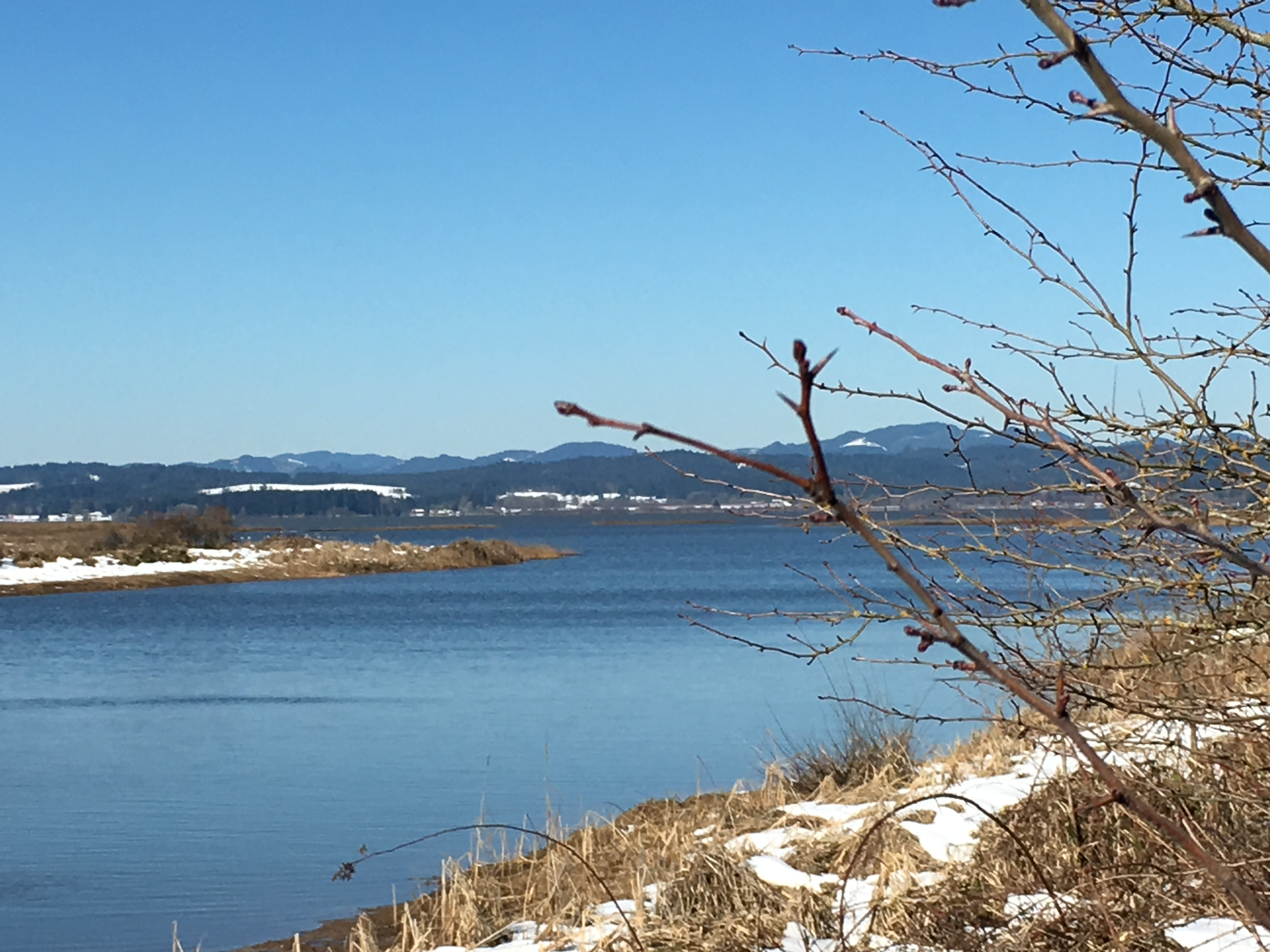
Amazon Creek Diversion Channel Meeting the Fern Ridge Reservoir

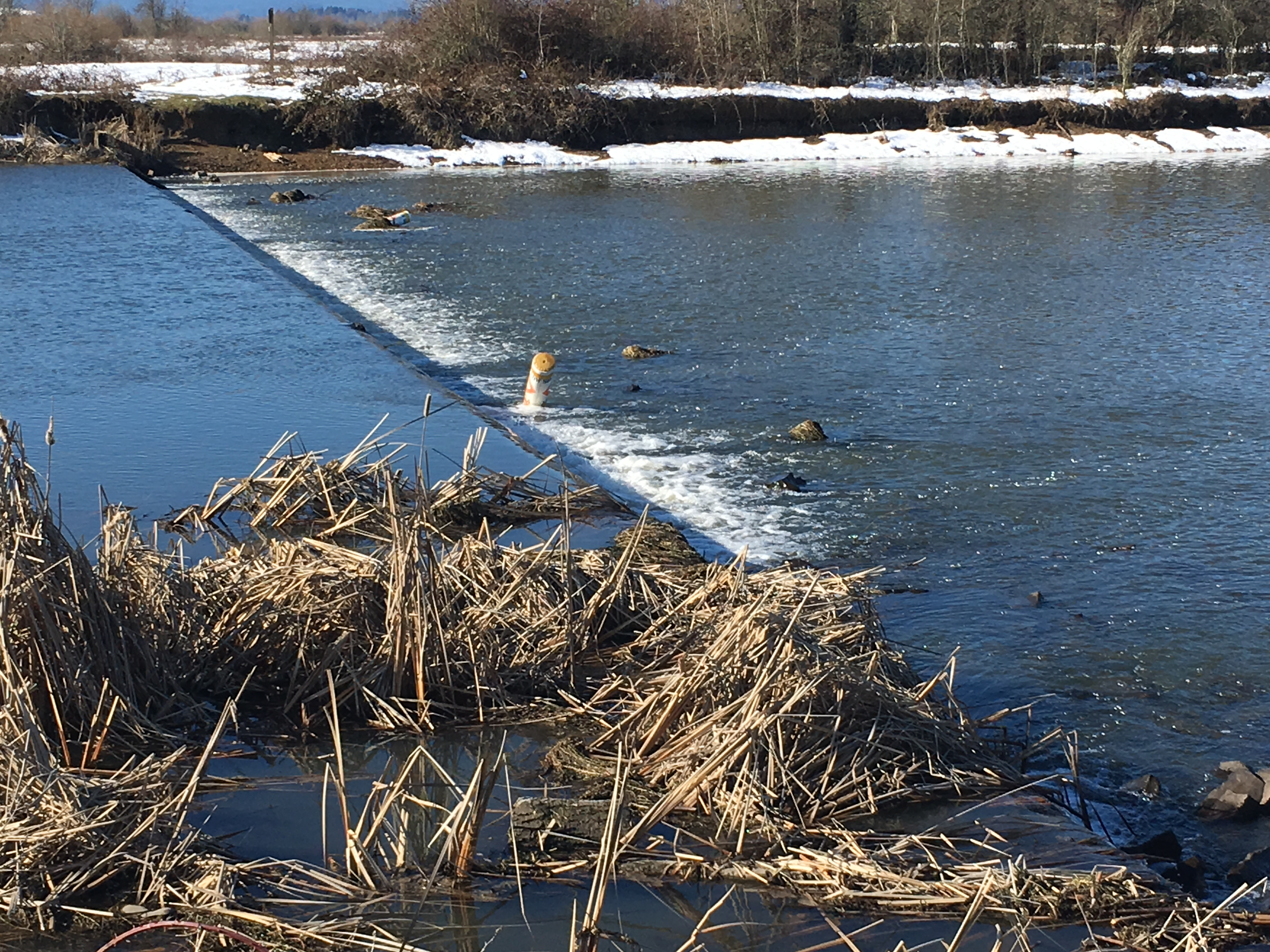
Drop Structure at the mouth of the Amazon Creek Diversion Channel in Winter

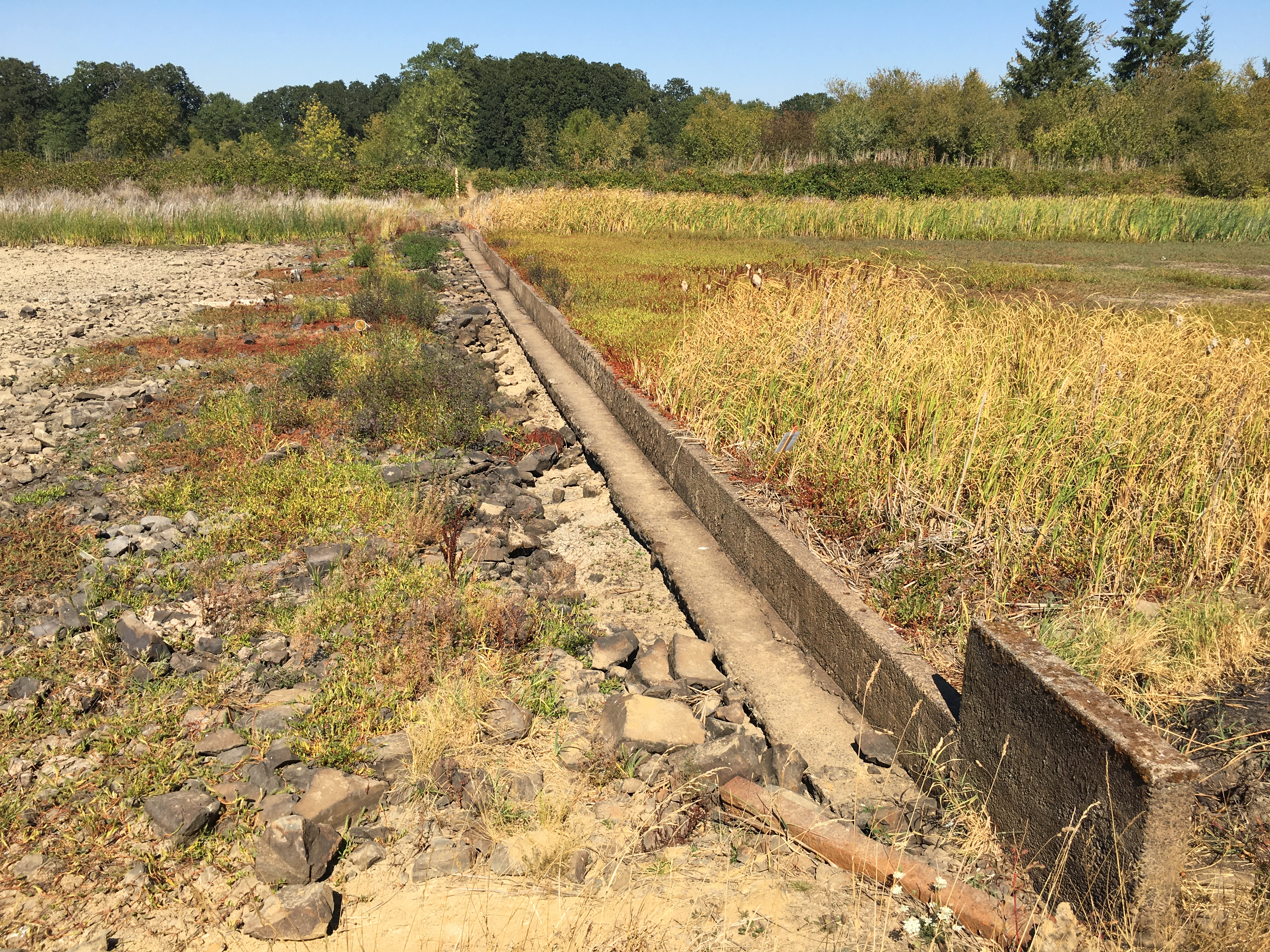
Drop Structure at the mouth of the Amazon Creek Diversion Channel in Summer

== See also ==
- List of rivers of Oregon
