= Sunshine movie =

Sunshine movie may refer to:

- Sunshine (2007 film), a science fiction film directed by Danny Boyle
- Sunshine (1999 film), an award-winning post World War II film directed by István Szabó
- Sunshine Daydream, a 1972 film about a Grateful Dead concert
