= Long Tom River =

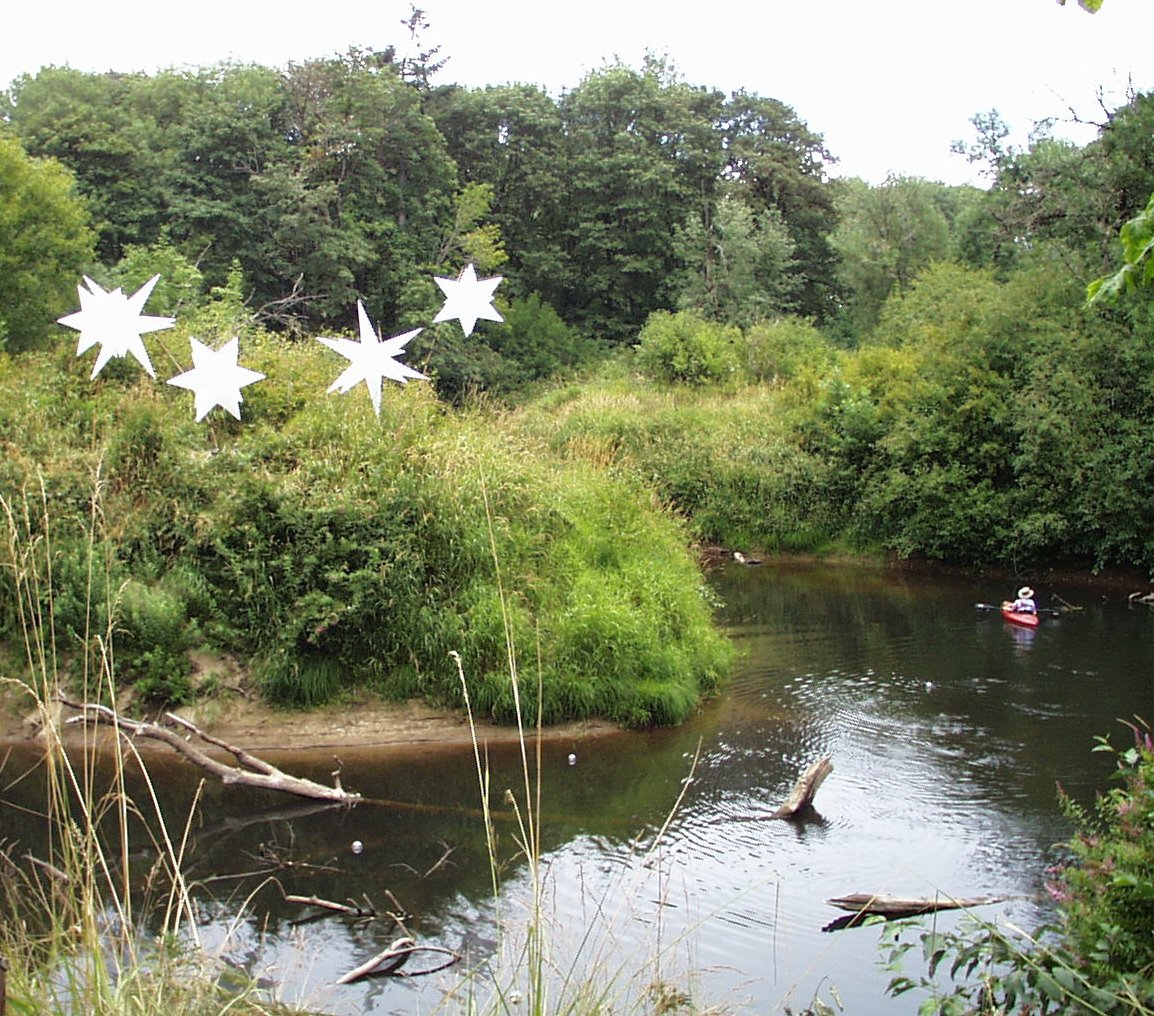
- The Long Tom River as it appears while passing through the Oregon Country Fair's land near Veneta

- Location of the mouth of the Long Tom River in Oregon
- Etymology: Developed gradually in the 19th century in imitation of a native tribal name

Location
- Country: United States
- State: Oregon
- County: Lane and Benton

Physical characteristics
- Source: Central Oregon Coast Range
  - location: Long Tom Station, Lane County
  - coordinates: 44°13′12″N 123°26′39″W
  - elevation: 1,131 ft (345 m)
- Mouth: Willamette River
  - location: Norwood Island, Benton County
  - coordinates: 44°22′48″N 123°14′54″W
  - elevation: 256 ft (78 m)
- Length: 57 mi (92 km)
- Basin size: 410 sq mi (1,100 km^{2})
- Discharge
  - average: 753 cu ft/s (21.3 m^{3}/s)

The Long Tom River is a 57-mile (92 km) tributary of the Willamette River in western Oregon in the United States. It drains an area at the south end of the Willamette Valley between Eugene and Corvallis.

It rises in the Central Oregon Coast Range in western Lane County, approximately 10 mi (16 km) west of Veneta. It flows east through the mountains to Veneta, through the Fern Ridge Reservoir, and then north into the Willamette Valley, roughly parallel to and west of the Willamette River. It joins the Willamette from the southwest approximately 4 mi (6.5 km) west of Halsey. The Fern Ridge Reservoir was created in 1942 when the United States Army Corps of Engineers dammed the river to control flooding.

The watershed includes approximately 410 sq mi (1,100 km^{2}) of land (262,000 acres, 1060 km^{2}) zoned as 45 percent forest, 30 percent agricultural, 8 public, and 17 percent urban or rural residential. The Long Tom waters support more than 140,000 people in the area, including residents in the city of Veneta and the rural farming communities of Alvadore, Cheshire, Crow, Franklin, and Noti, as well as industrial and commercial land on the western edge of Eugene. These lands were inhabited by the Chelamela group of the Kalapuya Indians prior to European settlement.

The Oregon Country Fair is one of many groups and agencies that work with the Long Tom Watershed Council to protect and restore the river.

== Name ==
The river's name, Long Tom, developed gradually during the 19th century in imitation of a native tribal group called Lung-tum-ler. The Native American name of this Kalapuyan group is [lámpʰtumpif], literally meaning "spank-his-ass".

The earliest newspaper record of the source of this name was published on December 13, 1849, in the Oregon Spectator newspaper. The article states the origin as:

"Several years ago a man (a trapper I learned) by the name of Thomas Bass was killed on the stream alluded to; being a tall man his comrades named him Long Tom, and the river has borne this name ever since the death of Bass."

== Tributaries ==
Named tributaries from source to mouth are Micheals, Jones, Swamp, Dusky, Hayes, Sweet, Green, and Gold creeks. Then come Noti, Wilson, Indian creeks before the river enters Fern Ridge Reservoir. Hannavan and Inman creeks enter the reservoir as does Coyote Creek. (The topographic map also shows a separate Coyote Creek that leaves the reservoir south of the main Long Tom channel and rejoins it further downstream.) Below the reservoir come Squaw, the second confluence with Coyote Creek, then Lingo Slough, Bear, Amazon, Ferguson, Shafer, and Miller creeks.

== See also ==
- List of longest streams of Oregon
- List of dams and reservoirs in the United States
- List of rivers of Oregon
