= Eugene Yacht Club =

Yacht club

Coordinates: 44°6′56.88″N 123°18′47.0262″W

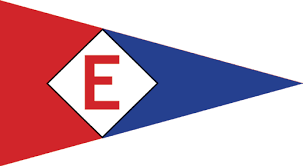
- Burgee
- Short name: EYC
- Founded: 1940
- Location: 26126 Bangs Rd, Junction City, Oregon 97448
- Commodore: Roeland Kapsenberg

The Eugene Yacht Club (EYC) is a yacht club founded in 1940.

EYC is fifteen miles west from downtown Eugene, Oregon. It has a long history of supporting all aspects of sailing, maintains a Sailing School for beginners through advanced racing, and sponsors National Class racing.

The excellent wind and water conditions, the lack of current and commercial boat traffic, and the size and shape of Fern Ridge Lake allow the use of the standard Olympic circle racing course. This and the availability of camping on the grounds make EYC an ideal place for regattas and other organized sailing events.

EYC's Memorial Day Regatta, first held in 1945, regularly attracts competitors from clubs from all over the West Coast. In June, EYC hosts the Live on the Edge Regatta, a competition just for multi-hull sailors. The Harvest Regatta in August draws competitors from around the region each year.
