= Milt Davis =

American football player (1929–2008)

- Davis in 1957

No. 20
- Position: Defensive back

Personal information
- Born: May 31, 1929; Muskogee, Oklahoma, U.S.
- Died: September 29, 2008 (aged 79); Elmira, Oregon, U.S.
- Listed height: 6 ft 1 in (1.85 m)
- Listed weight: 188 lb (85 kg)

Career information
- High school: Thomas Jefferson (OK)
- College: UCLA
- NFL draft: 1954: 8th round, 97th overall pick

Career history
- Baltimore Colts (1957–1960)

Awards and highlights
- 2× NFL champion (1958, 1959); First-team All-Pro (1957); Second-team All-Pro (1959); 2× NFL interceptions co-leader (1957, 1959)

Career NFL statistics
- Interceptions: 27
- Fumble recoveries: 4
- Total touchdowns: 3
- Stats at Pro Football Reference

Milton Eugene "Pops" Davis (May 31, 1929 – September 29, 2008) was a defensive back who played four seasons in the National Football League (NFL) for the Baltimore Colts.

An NFL rookie in 1957 at the comparatively advanced age of 28, Davis made an immediate impact in the league, intercepting 10 passes in 14 games and making the Pro Bowl. He finished with 27 career interceptions with the Colts in just 46 games, retiring at age 31.

Davis returned to school, where he obtained a doctorate degree and subsequently worked as a community college professor for 25 years.

== Early life ==
Milt Davis was born May 31, 1929, on the Fort Gibson Indian reservation in Muskogee, Oklahoma to a father of African American and Native American ancestry. His father was Black and Muscogee while his mother was Black and Kiowa.

The family moved to California during the Great Depression, when Milt was a toddler, packing all their belongings in a Ford Model T to escape the Oklahoma Dust Bowl. He became a Roman Catholic as a child, but when problems arose in his family he landed at a Jewish children's home called Vista del Mar. He would remain there for 17 years, later working there as a counselor.

Davis attended Jefferson High School in Los Angeles. He was initially no great fan of football, however, concentrating on baseball and running track.

== College career ==
Davis attended Los Angeles City College, working in his spare time to pay for school.

His track performance running the quarter-mile earned him a partial scholarship at the University of California, Los Angeles.

He earned a spot on the UCLA Bruins football varsity football team in both 1952 and 1953 under coach Red Sanders, and played in the team's 1954 Rose Bowl 28–20 loss to the Michigan State Spartans.

== Professional career ==
The Detroit Lions drafted him in the eighth round of the 1954 NFL draft with the 97th overall pick. That same year he was drafted into the United States Army, serving the standard two years in uniform.

Davis returned to the Lions for the 1956 NFL season, playing in just two games before being cut on October 11 as the team made personnel moves to get down to the 33-man roster limit. The cut was handled utterly gracelessly, with head coach Buddy Parker having it announced that Davis and teammate Pete Retzlaff had been cut via the public address system of Willow Run Airport.

According to Davis the Lions told him at the time, "We don't have a black teammate for you to go on road trips, therefore you can't stay on our team."

"That's one of those slaps in the face," Davis later recalled. "It hurt considerably, but I'd been hurt so many times, that was minor."

Davis' career could have ended at this juncture if not for having worked out at a playground off Los Angeles' Denker Avenue in the off-season with Gene "Big Daddy" Lipscomb. Lipscomb, a beloved defensive tackle for the Baltimore Colts, was impressed with Davis' athleticism and promised to tell his team about him. Colts GM Don "Red" Kellett was shortly in touch by long-distance telephone.

The Colts invited Davis to training camp ahead of the 1957 NFL season and liked what they saw, tendering him a free agent contract.

The 1957 season would be the best for the 28-year old newcomer jokingly nicknamed "Pops." Davis intercepted 10 passes that season, returning 2 of them for touchdowns, and racked up 219 interception return yards to lead the league — a watched defensive statistic in that era.

Davis was named a first team member of the Associated Press NFL All-Pro Team that season.

Fresh off his All-Pro season, Davis signed with the Colts for 1958 — a contract which paid him $7,000 — the equivalent of approximately $75,000 in 2024. That year Davis had four interceptions, which he returned for a total of 40 yards.

In the 1958 NFL Championship Game against the New York Giants, Davis — despite playing with two broken bones in his right foot — forced one of two first-half fumbles by Giants running back Frank Gifford, both of which led to touchdowns by the Colts. Davis was playing in considerable pain and chose to wear soft basketball shoes instead of stiff cleats in the game. He was forced out of action in the fourth quarter when the pain-numbing shot of Novocain he took ahead of the game began to wear off.

The Colts won 23–17 in overtime in a game remembered in football lore as "The Greatest Game Ever Played". It would be the first of two back-to-back championships for Davis and the Baltimore Colts.

Davis had seven interceptions in the 1959 season, which he returned for 119 yards, including a 57-yard return for a touchdown. In the 1959 NFL Championship Game, the Colts beat the Giants for a second consecutive season, this time by a 31–16 score. In 1960, he had six interceptions which he returned for 32 yards.

== Life after football ==
During his travels as an NFL player — and his time at Colts training camp in Westminster, Maryland — Davis bridled at the treatment of black players, particularly when encountering segregated hotels and restaurants.

"I would always scream to get the manager, because I’m in the land of the free and the home of the brave, and I wanted to put them on the spot," Davis recalled. "It was important. I’m a college graduate, veteran, taxpayer."

Davis retired from football at the age of 31, having played four seasons in the NFL, and returned to complete work on a doctorate in education at UCLA. Upon completion of his degree he taught for 25 years at Los Angeles City College, retiring in 1989.

On weekends Davis worked for 36 years as a scout for four NFL teams — the Colts, Miami Dolphins, Cleveland Browns, and Lions. He also obtained periodic work as a movie extra and appeared in television commercials for Texaco and Western Airlines.

After his academic career ended, Davis retired to a 50-acre ranch in rural Oregon with his wife, where he raised sheep, cattle, and llamas.

== Death and legacy ==
Milt Davis died at his home in Elmira, Oregon, an unincorporated rural community west of Eugene, of brain cancer on September 29, 2008. He was 79 years old at the time of his death.

Hall of Fame running back Lenny Moore said of his teammate and friend Davis, "Aside from being a great football player, he was a man that knew about life issues and knew how to deal with it. He was a beacon.... He was incredibly respected, both with the white players and the black players."

In his memoir, published three years before Davis' death, Moore left a more detailed account of what Davis had meant to the Colts team during their championship years: "He was a highly educated individual, a tremendous team leader, an excellent safety, and a fierce competitor. Milt was our locker room diplomat, helping many players overcome their differences in troubled times. He entered the League later in life than most, and he was older and well tutored when we got him. I'm happy to say that, to this day, he is a dear friend, and I don't use that term loosely."
