= Elmira High School (Oregon) =

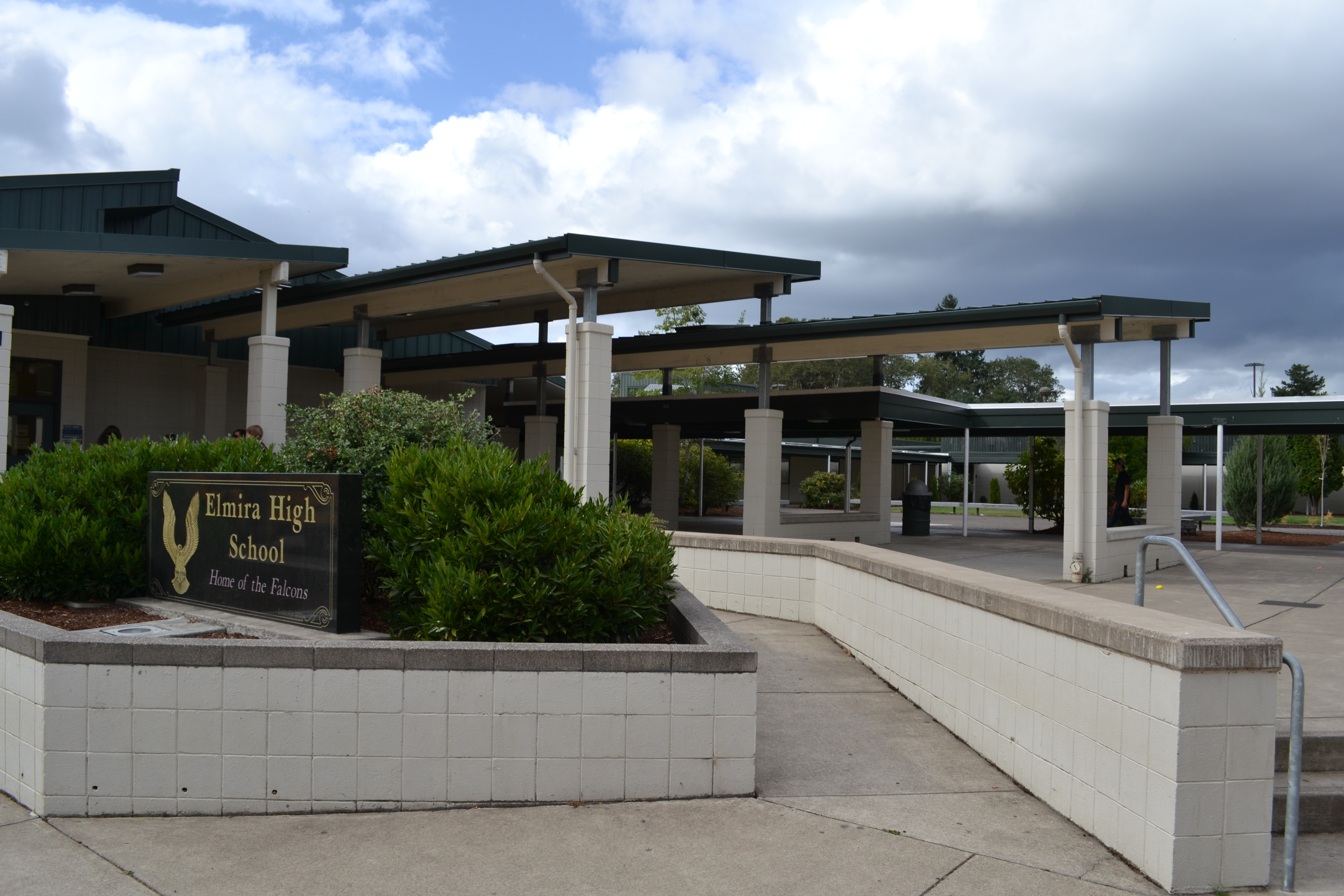

Location
- 24936 Fir Grove Lane; Elmira, Lane County, Oregon 97437; United States; 44.073352°N 123.36042°W

Information
- Type: Public
- Opened: 1911
- School district: Fern Ridge School District
- Principal: Cydney Vandercar
- Teaching staff: 20.19 (FTE)
- Grades: 9-12
- Enrollment: 374 (2024-2025)
- Student to teacher ratio: 18.52
- Colors: Purple and gold
- Athletics conference: OSAA Mountain Valley Conference 3A-4
- Mascot: Falcons
- Rival: Junction City High School
- Website: Official website

Elmira High School (often abbreviated as EHS) is a public high school in Elmira, Oregon, United States, located approximately 15 miles from Eugene, Oregon. It is one of the four schools of the Fern Ridge School District and provides an education of grades 9-12 for the city of Veneta, as well as for the towns of Elmira, Noti and Walton. Total enrollment numbers range from 350 to 450 students with a roughly even gender ratio. They operate on a seven period schedule over the course of two semesters, beginning in early September and ending in early June. EHS has four main buildings. In the lower left corner of the school consists of the main office and entrance, the theatre, library and the main studio for the school's radio station KOCF-LP (92.7 FM), hosted by Stuart "Stu" Burgess. This building also contains the main hallways for the sophomore, junior and senior classes, as well as the counseling and learning centers. There is also an outdoor area outside of the building for social gatherings between students during passing periods and lunch. In the lower right corner is where the main gym and auxiliary gym are situated, as well as the freshman hallway and the Home Ec classroom. The auxiliary gym used to be the school's front entrance, however due to the athletics department asking for more practicing space and extracurricular opportunities, the auxiliary gym was built to satisfy those needs, and the school went for a more interior focused entrance. In the upper left corner is the Cafeteria, and in the upper right corner is the Band/Choir room, the weight room and workshops for students interested in welding, carpentry, woodworking and more.

== Academics ==
In 2008, 83% of the school's seniors received their high school diploma. Of 108 students, 90 graduated, 5 dropped out, 33 received a modified diploma, with 33 remaining in high school.

As of 2020, 92% of the school's 92 seniors received their high school diploma, a 9% increase since 2008. According to the Oregon Statewide Assessment System, EHS students had an overall math proficiency of 53% and a reading proficiency of 88%, both of which are higher than the state average.

== Athletics ==
Elmira High School plays at the 4A level for sports such as soccer, volleyball, basketball, wrestling, cheerleading, baseball, softball, and track and field. The football team plays down at the 3A level. The school also hosts an annual Powder Puff football match between the girls of the senior and junior classes, while the boys of the EHS football team do the cheerleading.

== Clubs ==
- National Honor Society (NHS): The basis of NHS is to provide community service throughout the city and towns they serve for including participating and helping blood drives, serving food for the homeless, and many other charitable acts.
- Interact Club: Similar to NHS, Interact Club is a community service based club that allows anyone from EHS to join. So far in their repertoire they have most notably helped develop a greenhouse for Elmira Elementary School.
- Key Club: Another community service club with student volunteers. Their main focus is to raise money for Doernbecher's Children's Hospital with the people of Kiwanis. Currently led by a school staff member Julie Burton.
- Radio Club: This club allows the students of EHS to learn and experience the process of making and/or hosting a radio show.
- Film Club: This club allows the students of EHS to learn and experience the process of making and/or acting in film productions. The bulk of the EHS film club's work consists of recreated movie trailers and voice overs of popular movie scenes, which can be found on the Elmira High School YouTube channel along with the school's film class projects.
- Robotics Club: This club allows any EHS student to team up with others to build a battlebot to take on other schools.

== Championships ==
- Softball: 1992, 1993, 2003, 2004, 2006
- Boys Track and Field: 1973, 1980
- Boys Basketball: 1964
- Cheerleading: 1989, 1990
- Oregon Battle of the Books (OBOB): 2016, 2017

== Notable alumni ==
- Nathan Sawaya - Lego Artist
