= Fern Ridge Wildlife Area =

Wildlife reserve in Oregon, United States

- IUCN category V (protected landscape/seascape)
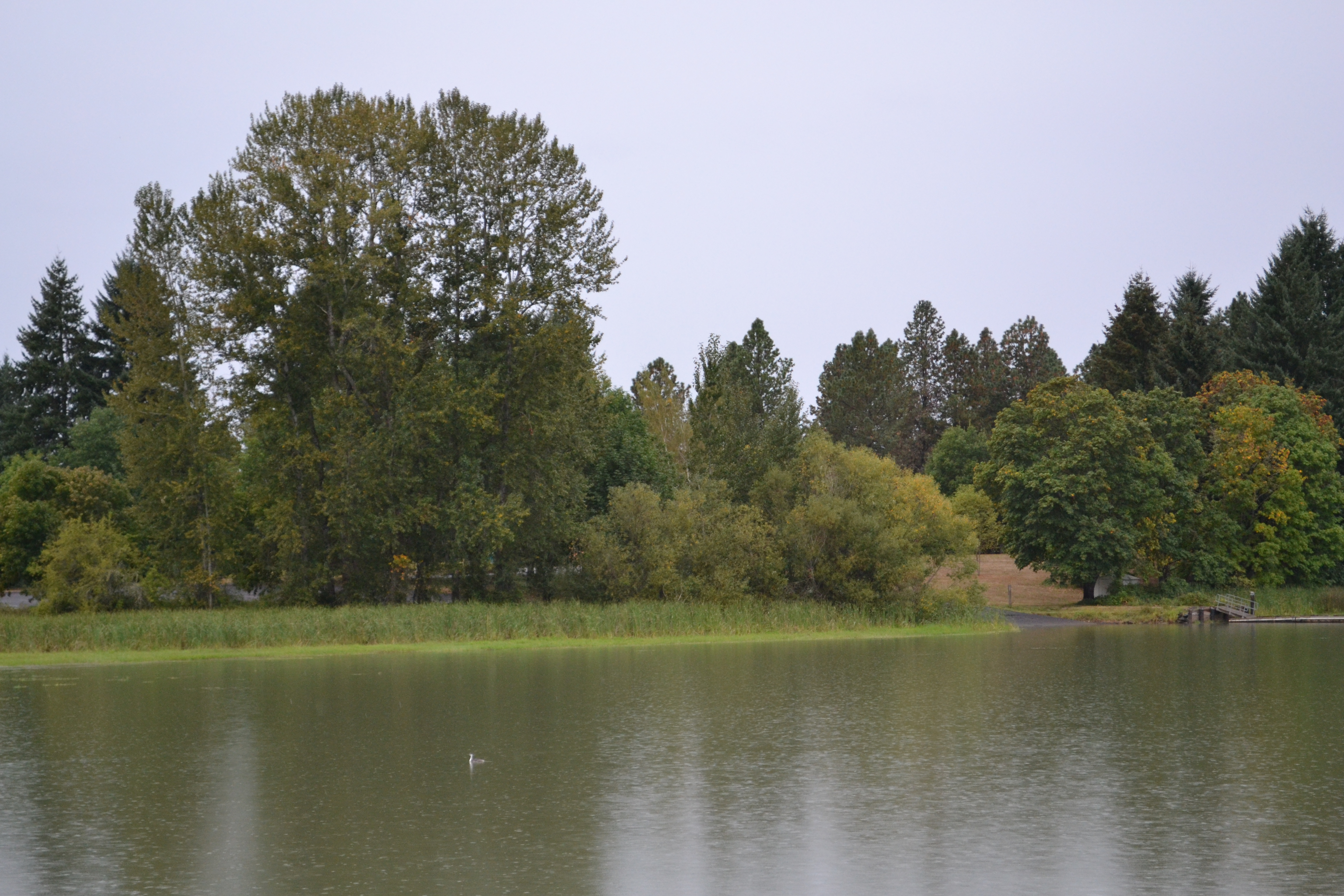

- Location within the United States
- Location: Lane County, Oregon
- Nearest city: Veneta, Oregon
- Coordinates: 44.1204011°N 123.2995395°W
- Area: 5,010 acres (20.3 km^{2})
- Established: 1957
- Governing body: Oregon Department of Fish and Wildlife

The Fern Ridge Wildlife Area is a wildlife management area located west of Eugene, Oregon, in the United States. It is named for the Fern Ridge Reservoir which it partially surrounds.

More than 250 species of birds use the area during different seasons of the year. Shorebirds, raptors and wintering waterfowl including ducks, geese and swans can be seen during late fall and winter.

Volunteering opportunities to support the wildlife area are managed by the Oregon Department of Fish and Wildlife (ODFW).

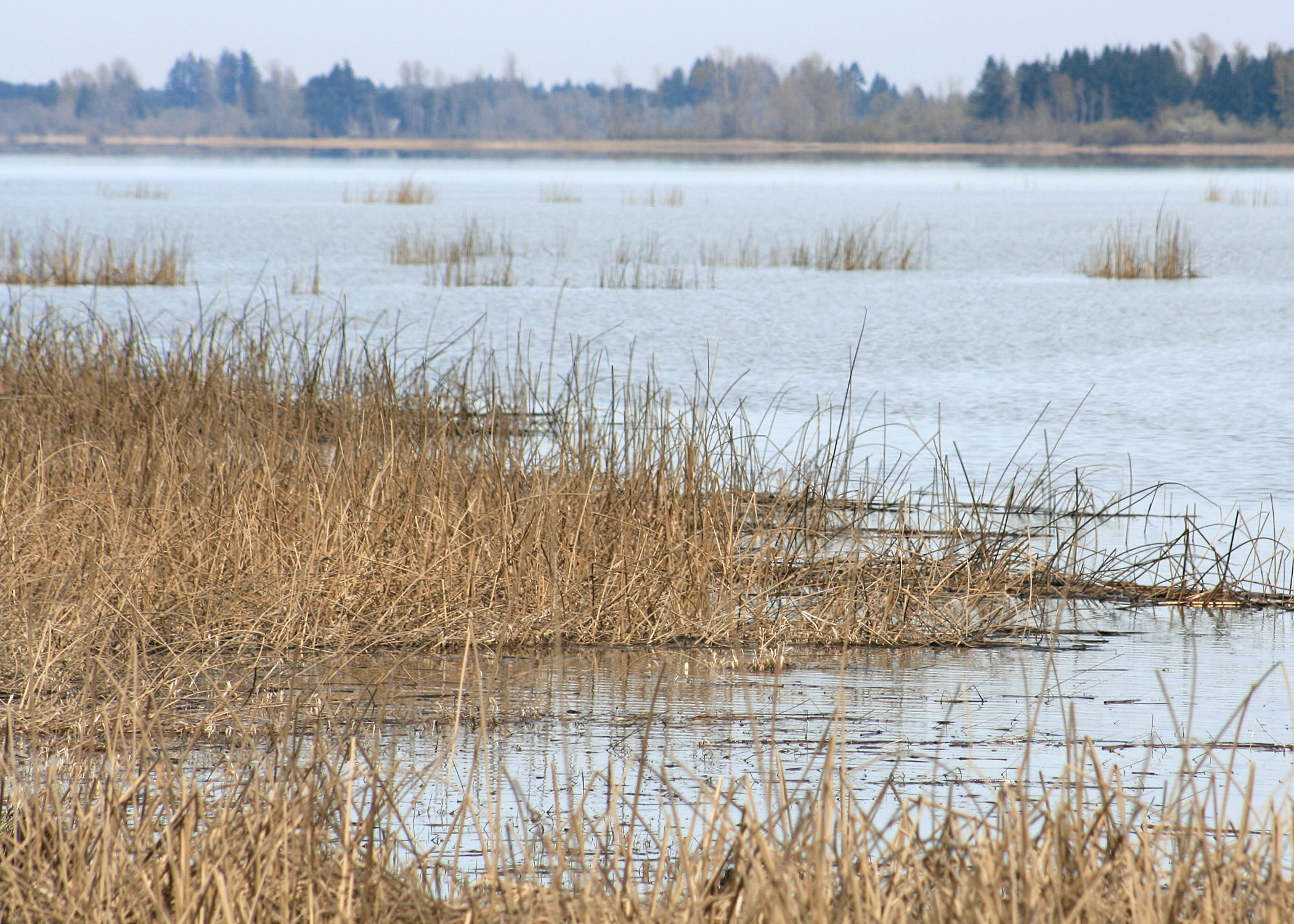
Wetlands in the wildlife area
