= Coyote Creek Bridge =

Covered bridge in Oregon, US

- U.S. National Register of Historic Places
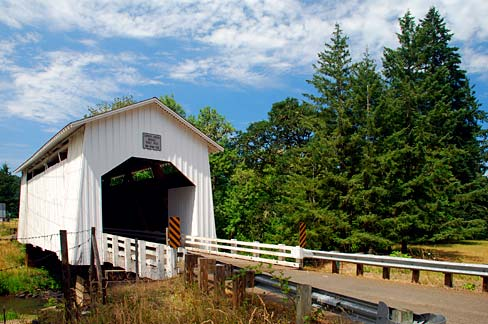
- Coyote Creek Bridge in 2008

- Location within Oregon Location within the United States
- Nearest city: Crow
- Coordinates: 43°58′12″N 123°19′08″W
- Built: 1922
- Architectural style: Howe truss
- NRHP reference No.: 79002084
- Added to NRHP: November 29, 1979

The Coyote Creek Bridge is a covered bridge near Crow, United States, that is listed on the National Register of Historic Places. The 60-foot (18 m) Howe truss structure, built in 1922, carries Battle Creek Road over Coyote Creek. The bridge is a site for hikes and other outdoor events during spring and summer.

== See also ==
- List of bridges on the National Register of Historic Places in Oregon
- National Register of Historic Places listings in Lane County, Oregon
