= Veneta, Oregon, 8/27/72 =

Live album by New Riders of the Purple Sage
- Released: September 21, 2004
- Recorded: August 27, 1972
- Genre: Country rock
- Length: 70:23
- Label: Kufala
- Producer: Rob Bleetstein

New Riders of the Purple Sage chronology
Boston Music Hall, 12/5/72 (2003)	Veneta, Oregon, 8/27/72 (2004)	Armadillo World Headquarters, Austin, TX, 6/13/75 (2005)

Veneta, Oregon, 8/27/72 is an album by the country rock band the New Riders of the Purple Sage. It was recorded live on August 27, 1972, at the Springfield Creamery Benefit concert, at Temple Meadow, near Veneta, Oregon. It was released on September 21, 2004. It was the third complete New Riders concert that was recorded in the 1970s and released in the 2000s as an album on the Kufala Recordings label, and the only one to be released as one disc instead of two.

In 2020, the album was remixed and remastered, and retitled Field Trip. It was released on CD by Omnivore Recordings on April 24, 2020. It was released as a two-disc LP, in a limited edition of 1,500 copies, on August 29, 2020, in conjunction with Record Store Day.

== Springfield Creamery Benefit ==
The Springfield Creamery Benefit, sometimes called the Field Trip, was a benefit concert for a dairy owned by Chuck Kesey, the brother of Ken Kesey, and his wife Sue. The New Riders of the Purple Sage were the warm up band for the Grateful Dead. Despite challenging technical conditions — the weather was unusually hot, and many of the people present were under the influence of LSD — the Dead's performance that day is highly regarded by tape traders. The concert is documented in a film and an album, both called Sunshine Daydream.

== CD production ==
According to the CD liner notes, Veneta, Oregon, 8/27/72 "was produced from the original 16-track analog master tapes running at 15 i.p.s. We've tried to preserve this day as it was.... An outdoor event on an extremely hot day with an assortment of Merry Pranksters on the loose." The album includes several sets of stage announcements that were made during the course of the New Riders' performance, as well as some onstage remarks by members of the band.

== Critical reception ==
Professional ratings
Review scores
Source	Rating
Allmusic	4/5 stars

On Allmusic, Ronnie D. Lankford, Jr. said, "While the New Riders were always much more straightforward in concert than the Dead, and thus lacked the jam band appeal, they were nonetheless a formidable force. And while they are often remembered for combining country and rock, they sound like a good old-fashioned rock band here, even on a country song like "Truck Drivin' Man". Specifically, David Nelson's guitar work and Buddy Cage's steel work add pizzazz to even the most mundane song, while Dave Torbert's bass adds infinite bottom end. For whatever reason, Veneta seems even tighter, more musically together, than previous [live archival] releases."

On Jambands.com, Mike Greenhaus wrote, "While more polished live packages and reissued studio sessions still define their canon, rough-edged live releases like Veneta, Oregon, 8/27/72 are essential in capturing both the sound and the feel of the New Riders' golden age.... the country quintet stemmed from the Dead's American Beauty studio peak, layering gentle psychedelic touches into their concise rock songs. Always more comfortable playing the tripped-out country-folk Gram Parsons trademarked during his tenure in The Byrds, the NRPS offer unique live versions of cuts like "Louisiana Lady" and "Hello Mary Lou", without necessarily jamming such tracks. And, with the exception of the country-rock workout "Willie and the Hand Jive", this bare bones release is stacked with short, tight songs, not epic jams."

On Earvolution, Jim McCoy said, "Cage's playing is the highlight throughout, with his trademark solo on the late Gene Pitney's "Hello Mary Lou" blazing like a rocket up his 10-string E9 neck; similarly, his twangy, pronounced double stops bring great life to "Groupie" and "Whatcha Gonna Do". It's not that the other musicians are slackers; in fact, the opposite is true.... for those already familiar with the New Riders — especially fans of Buddy Cage — this recording is an essential. Those Deadheads for which 8/27/72 holds a special place in their collections would also be wise to pick up this disc not just for the sake of having a complete representation of the day in their hundreds of hours of material, but because it is a solid example of live early-seventies rock music in its own right."

== Track listing ==
1. "Truck Drivin' Man" (Terry Fell) – 2:56
2. "Rainbow" (John Dawson) – 3:40
3. "Lochinvar" (Dawson) – 4:51
4. "Groupie" (Dave Torbert) – 3:08
5. Stage Announcement – White Bird Tent – 2:08
6. "Whatcha Gonna Do" (Dawson) – 3:40
7. "Dim Lights, Thick Smoke (And Loud, Loud Music)" (Max Fidler, Joe Maphis, Rose Lee Maphis) – 3:37
8. "Hello Mary Lou" (Gene Pitney) – 3:08
9. Stage Announcement – Field Tripping – 0:56
10. "Whiskey" (Dawson) – 3:52
11. Stage Announcement – Salt Tabs & Blue Acid – 1:35
12. "Runnin' Back to You" (Dawson) – 4:14
13. "I Don't Need No Doctor" (Jo Armstead, Nick Ashford, Valerie Simpson) – 6:25
14. "Linda" (Dawson) – 5:21
15. "Louisiana Lady" (Dawson) – 3:56
16. "Last Lonely Eagle" (Dawson) – 6:07
17. "Willie and the Hand Jive" (Johnny Otis) – 10:38

== Personnel ==
New Riders of the Purple Sage

- Buddy Cage – pedal steel guitar
- John Dawson – rhythm guitar, vocals
- Spencer Dryden – drums
- David Nelson – lead guitar, vocals
- Dave Torbert – bass guitar, vocals

Technical personnel

- Produced by Rob Bleetstein
- Mixed and mastered by Stephen Barncard
- 16–track transfer by Jeffrey Norman
- Recorded by Bob Matthews and Betty Cantor
- Bus blotter art by Zane Kesey
- Event photos from the film Sunshine Daydream courtesy of Canis Major / Sam Field
- Stage announcements by Ken Babbs

== See also ==
- Sunshine Daydream
