= Sunshine Daydream =

- Sunshine Daydream film poster
- Directed by: John Norris
- Produced by: Sam Field
- Starring: Grateful Dead
- Production company: Canis Major
- Distributed by: Rhino Entertainment
- Release date: August 1, 2013
- Running time: 102 minutes
- Country: United States
- Language: English

Sunshine Daydream is a music documentary film, starring the rock band the Grateful Dead. It was shot at their August 27, 1972 concert at the Old Renaissance Faire Grounds in Veneta, Oregon. Unreleased for many years, the film was sometimes shown at small film festivals, and bootleg recordings of it circulated on VHS and DVD, and as digital downloads. A digitally remastered and reedited official version of the film was released on August 1, 2013, showing only one time in selected theaters as that year's edition of the Grateful Dead Meet-Up at the Movies. It was screened with Grateful Days, a new documentary short that includes interviews with some of the concert attendees. Sunshine Daydream was released on DVD and Blu-ray on September 17, 2013.

Actor Al Strobel, who played the one-armed man in Twin Peaks, shot footage that ended up in the film.

Sunshine Daydream is also a live album containing the complete August 27, 1972 Grateful Dead concert. Produced as a 3-disc CD and as a 4-disc LP, it was released by Rhino Records on September 17, 2013.

The name Sunshine Daydream is taken from the coda section of the Dead song "Sugar Magnolia".

== Concert ==
The lineup of the Grateful Dead for this concert: Jerry Garcia on guitar and vocals, Bob Weir on guitar and vocals, Phil Lesh on bass and vocals, Keith Godchaux on keyboards, Donna Jean Godchaux on vocals, and Bill Kreutzmann on drums.

The show was a benefit for the Springfield Creamery in nearby Springfield, Oregon. Merry Pranksters Ken Kesey and Ken Babbs emceed the concert. The Dead played all afternoon and into the dark after an opening set by the New Riders of the Purple Sage. In 2004, the New Riders' performance was released as an album called Veneta, Oregon, 8/27/72.

== Film ==
=== Production ===
The concert was filmed using four 16 mm cameras, in the woods of the Oregon Coast Range foothills, on the grounds of the Oregon Country Fair. The four 16mm cameras were synced to the sound, and remained focused on the stage, along with two additional roaming cameras for crowd shots. Originally even more cameras had been planned, under an ambitious scheme: "The plot was to develop a signature visual style of representing the band: a camera for each of the 16 channels (at least!) emphasizing the visual kinetics of the music making itself as well as the enormous open communication within the band."

After initial takes were shown to the band, reception was lukewarm and took a backseat to another film project which would become The Grateful Dead Movie. However, the footage for Sunshine Daydream remained sought after by fans and was eventually released after discussions between producer Sam Field and distributor Rhino Entertainment.

=== Songs in the film ===
- Excerpts from "Playing in the Band"
- "Promised Land"
- "China Cat Sunflower"
- "I Know You Rider"
- "Jack Straw"
- "Bird Song"
- "Dark Star"
- "El Paso"
- "Sing Me Back Home"
- "Greatest Story Ever Told"

== Album ==
Sunshine Daydream

Live album by Grateful Dead
- Released: September 17, 2013
- Recorded: August 27, 1972 at Old Renaissance Faire Grounds in Veneta, Oregon
- Genre: Rock
- Length: 176:04
- Label: Rhino
- Producer: Grateful Dead

Grateful Dead chronology
Dave's Picks Volume 7 (2013)	Sunshine Daydream (2013)	Dave's Picks Volume 8 (2013)

Sunshine Daydream is a live album by the rock band the Grateful Dead. It contains the complete concert recorded on August 27, 1972, at the Old Renaissance Faire Grounds in Veneta, Oregon. Produced as a three-disc CD and as a four-disc LP, it was released by Rhino Records on September 17, 2013. The album was mastered from the 16-track concert soundboard tapes.

The album debuted at #19 on the Billboard 200 on October 5, 2013.

=== Critical reception ===
Professional ratings
Review scores
Source	Rating
AllMusic	4.5/5 stars
Jazzwise	4/4 stars
Record Collector	5/5 stars

On AllMusic, Fred Thomas said, "The three sets here have everything that made this one of the most colorful and captivating eras of the Dead's live playing. Somewhere between the caveman psychedelia of their beginnings and the bluegrass-steeped folk-rock of their most popular studio albums American Beauty and Workingman's Dead, Garcia and company refined their live jamming skills into something that seemed almost like a mental synchronization at its best. ... A long-traded fan favorite, Sunshine Daydream finally sees a properly mixed presentation of the 16-track master tapes of nearly three hours of one of the Grateful Dead's finest concert moments. It's essential listening for Deadheads and possibly the best place for the curious to jump in."

"For Dead fans this was the concert that stands as a beacon, the hallmark for which all other Dead shows are judged", wrote Jenell Kesler for It's Psychedelic Baby! Magazine, speculating that "had this visionary wonder been released in the mid-'70's, it would have been raved about fans and the general public, because Sunshine Daydream... is a tour de force, an unparalleled vision of a Dead show at its very best, one laced with kaleidoscope images, bizarre animations, flower power on acid, and with more dripping tie dye and naked dancing girls, than one can stand."

=== Track listing ===
Disc 1

First set:

1. Introduction – 4:01
2. "Promised Land" (Chuck Berry) – 3:24
3. "Sugaree" (Jerry Garcia, Robert Hunter) – 7:30
4. "Me and My Uncle" (John Phillips) – 3:16
5. "Deal" (Garcia, Hunter) – 4:55
6. "Black-Throated Wind" (Bob Weir, John Perry Barlow) – 7:01
7. "China Cat Sunflower" (Garcia, Hunter) – 7:58 →
8. "I Know You Rider" (traditional, arranged by Grateful Dead) – 7:03
9. "Mexicali Blues" (Weir, Barlow) – 3:49
10. "Bertha" (Garcia, Hunter) – 5:59

Disc 2

Second set:

1. "Playing in the Band" (Weir, Mickey Hart, Hunter) – 19:57
2. "He's Gone" (Garcia, Hunter) – 9:32
3. "Jack Straw" (Weir, Hunter) – 5:06
4. "Bird Song" (Garcia, Hunter) – 13:17
5. "Greatest Story Ever Told" (Weir, Hart, Hunter) – 5:36

Disc 3

Third set:

1. "Dark Star" (Garcia, Hart, Bill Kreutzmann, Phil Lesh, Ron "Pigpen" McKernan, Weir, Hunter) – 31:28 →
2. "El Paso" (Marty Robbins) – 5:04
3. "Sing Me Back Home" (Merle Haggard) – 10:51 (Note: Previously released on So Many Roads)
4. "Sugar Magnolia" (Weir, Hunter) – 8:45
5. "Casey Jones" (Garcia, Hunter) – 6:25
6. "One More Saturday Night" (Weir) – 5:03

=== Personnel ===
Grateful Dead

- Jerry Garcia – guitar, vocals
- Donna Jean Godchaux – vocals
- Keith Godchaux – keyboards
- Bill Kreutzmann – drums
- Phil Lesh – bass, vocals
- Bob Weir – guitar, vocals

Production

- Produced by Grateful Dead
- Produced for release by David Lemieux
- Executive producer: Mark Pinkus
- Associate producers: Doran Tyson, Ryan Wilson
- Mixing, mastering: Jeffrey Norman
- Second engineer: Rick Vargas
- Recording: Bob Matthews, Betty Cantor-Jackson, Wiz, Janet Furman, Ron Wickersham
- Tape transfer, time-base correction, restoration: John K. Chester, Jamie Howarth
- Archival research: Nicholas Meriwether
- Tape research: Michael Wesley Johnson
- Art direction, illustration: Steve Vance
- Additional design: Lisa Glines
- Tie-dye art: Courtenay Pollock
- Special edition liner notes: David Lemieux, Sam Field, Johnny Dwork, Ken Babbs, Nicholas Meriwether

=== Charts ===
Chart (2013)	Peak position
US Billboard 200	19
Hungarian Albums (MAHASZ)	3
