= Crow, Oregon =

Unincorporated community in the state of Oregon, United States

- Unincorporated community
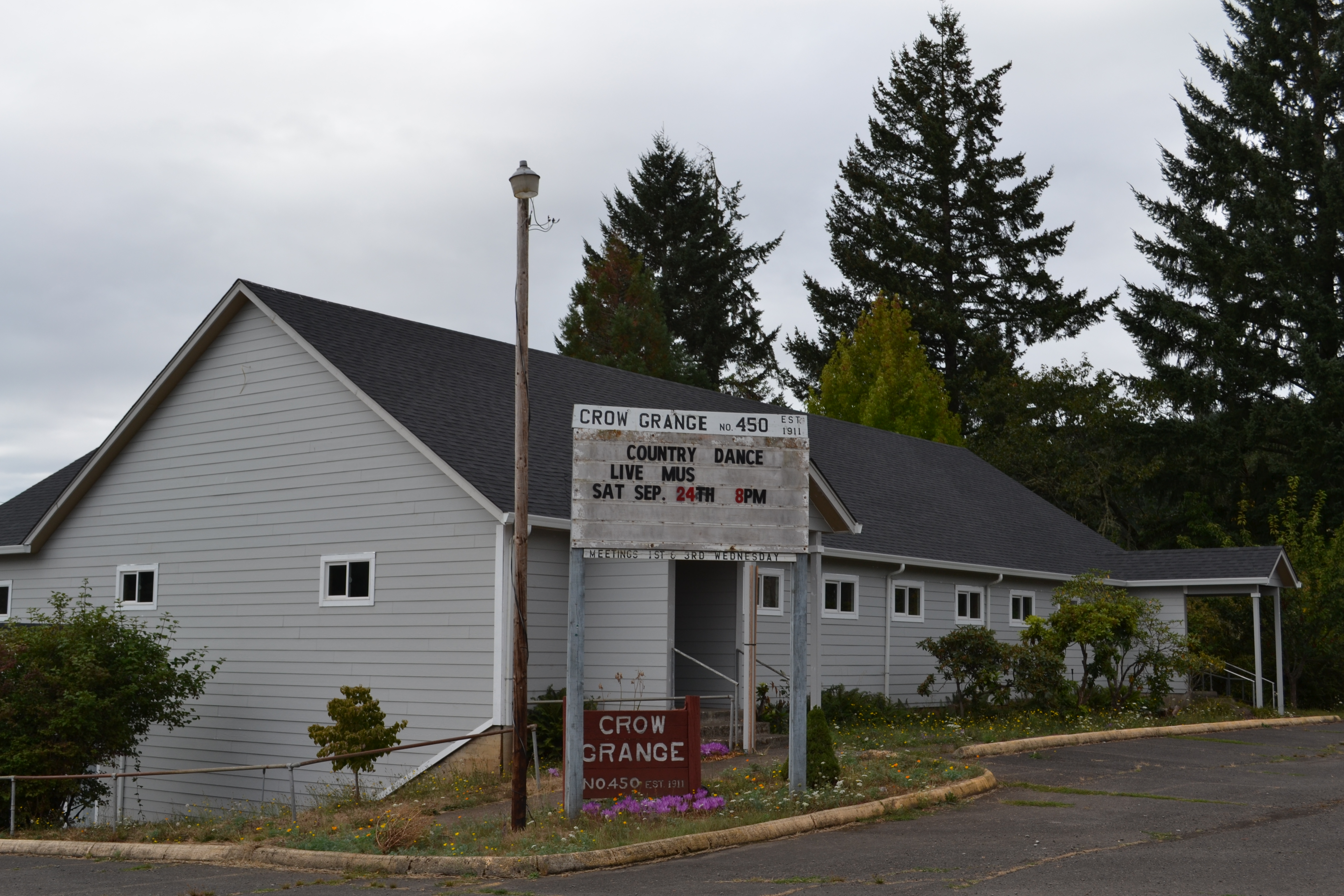

- Location within Oregon Location within the United States
- Coordinates: 43°59′34″N 123°20′22″W
- Country: United States
- State: Oregon
- County: Lane
- Elevation: 574 ft (175 m)
- Time zone: UTC-8 (Pacific (PST))
  - Summer (DST): UTC-7 (PDT)
- ZIP code: 97487
- Area codes: 458 and 541
- GNIS feature ID: 1119580

Crow is an unincorporated community in Lane County, Oregon, United States.

Crow post office was established in 1874 and named after community founders James Andrew Jackson Crow and Helen Frisk Crow, pioneers who came to Oregon by wagon train. The Coyote Creek Bridge, a covered bridge near Crow, has been on the National Register of Historic Places since 1979. Founded in 1975 in Crow, the Applegate Pioneer Museum was relocated to Veneta, Oregon, in 2000.

== See also ==
- Applegate Trail
