= Veneta, Oregon =

- City
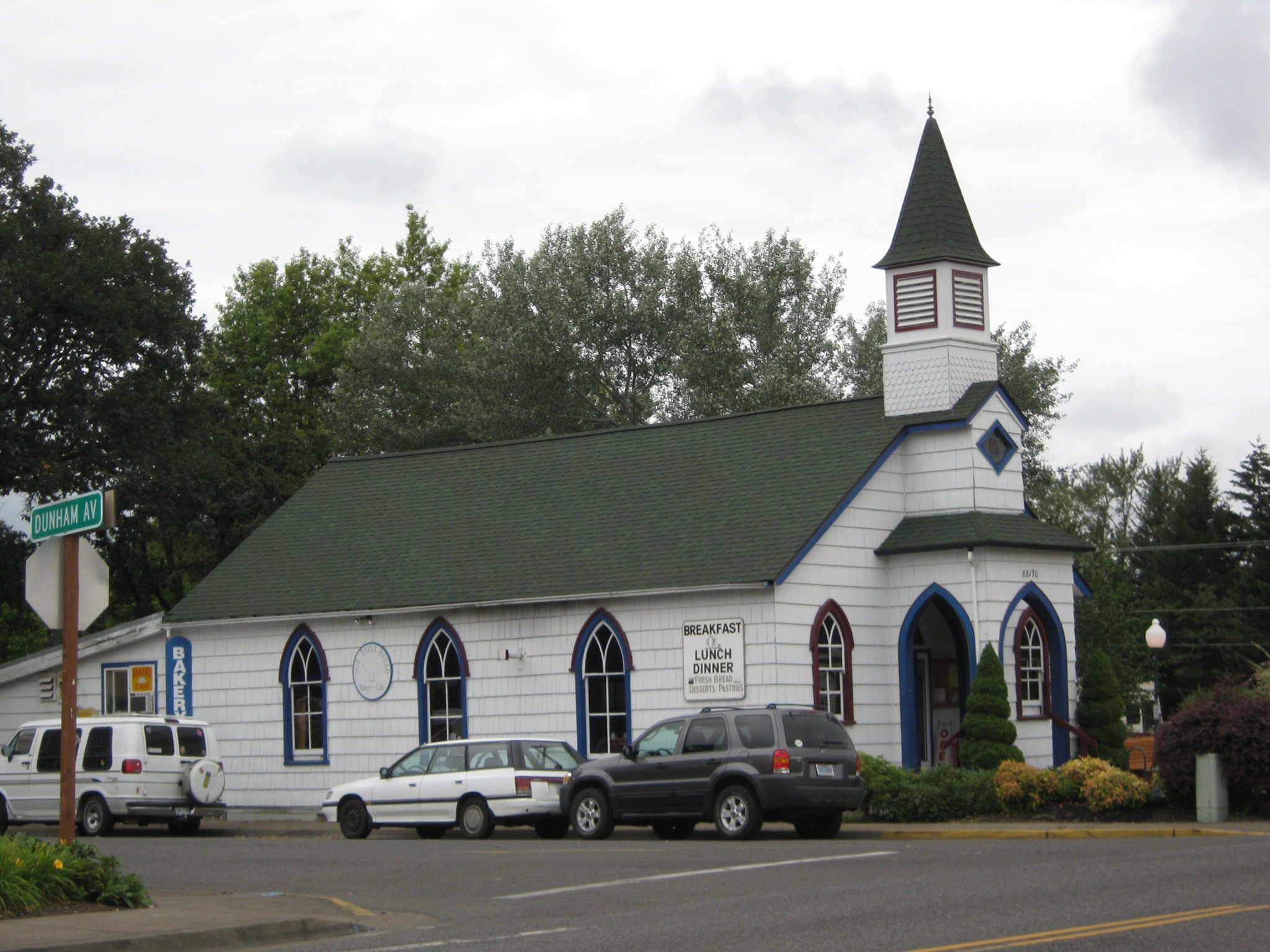
- Former church in Veneta, now a restaurant

- Location in Oregon
- Coordinates: 44°02′50″N 123°21′05″W
- Country: United States
- State: Oregon
- County: Lane
- Incorporated: 1962

Area
  - Total: 2.57 sq mi (6.66 km^{2})
  - Land: 2.57 sq mi (6.66 km^{2})
  - Water: 0 sq mi (0.00 km^{2})
- Elevation: 420 ft (130 m)

Population (2020)
  - Total: 5,214
  - Density: 2,028.8/sq mi (783.34/km^{2})
- Time zone: UTC-8 (Pacific)
  - Summer (DST): UTC-7 (Pacific)
- ZIP code: 97487
- Area codes: 458 and 541
- FIPS code: 41-77050
- GNIS feature ID: 2412148
- Website: www.venetaoregon.gov

Veneta is a city in Lane County, Oregon, United States. As of the 2020 U.S. census, the city population was 5,214.

== History ==
Veneta was established in 1912 by Edmund Eugene Hunter, who named the settlement after his five-year-old daughter. Veneta post office was established in 1914. Veneta Hunter Vincent, the city's namesake, died in 2000 at age 91. She had attended the city's 70th anniversary party in 1982.

Veneta has been the site of the annual Oregon Country Fair, originally called the Renaissance Faire, since 1970.

On August 27, 1972, the Grateful Dead played a concert—the first "Field Trip"—at the Oregon Country Fair site. The concert, a benefit for Springfield Creamery, has become legendary to Deadheads and is documented in the film Sunshine Daydream. The city's name is used on Veneta, Oregon, a 2004 release by New Riders of the Purple Sage, which is a live recording of the group's opening performance at the 1972 Field Trip.

== Geography ==
According to the United States Census Bureau, the city has a total area of 2.57 square miles (6.66 km^{2}), all of it land.

=== Climate ===
This region experiences warm (but not hot) and dry summers, with no average monthly temperatures above 71.6 °F (22.0 °C). According to the Köppen Climate Classification system, Veneta has a warm-summer Mediterranean climate, abbreviated "Csb" on climate maps.

Climate data for Veneta, Oregon (1991–2020 normals, extremes 1943–present)
Month	Jan	Feb	Mar	Apr	May	Jun	Jul	Aug	Sep	Oct	Nov	Dec	Year
Record high °F (°C)	69 (21)	73 (23)	81 (27)	86 (30)	95 (35)	104 (40)	107 (42)	108 (42)	102 (39)	92 (33)	75 (24)	66 (19)	108 (42)
Mean daily maximum °F (°C)	45.9 (7.7)	51.2 (10.7)	55.9 (13.3)	61.8 (16.6)	68.3 (20.2)	73.6 (23.1)	82.4 (28.0)	82.4 (28.0)	76.8 (24.9)	63.0 (17.2)	50.7 (10.4)	43.9 (6.6)	63.0 (17.2)
Daily mean °F (°C)	39.3 (4.1)	42.3 (5.7)	46.0 (7.8)	50.4 (10.2)	56.3 (13.5)	61.3 (16.3)	67.1 (19.5)	67.1 (19.5)	61.8 (16.6)	52.0 (11.1)	43.4 (6.3)	38.4 (3.6)	52.1 (11.2)
Mean daily minimum °F (°C)	32.7 (0.4)	33.3 (0.7)	36.0 (2.2)	38.9 (3.8)	44.2 (6.8)	49.0 (9.4)	51.9 (11.1)	51.8 (11.0)	46.7 (8.2)	40.9 (4.9)	36.1 (2.3)	32.9 (0.5)	41.2 (5.1)
Record low °F (°C)	−1 (−18)	−1 (−18)	19 (−7)	21 (−6)	27 (−3)	35 (2)	34 (1)	38 (3)	32 (0)	16 (−9)	15 (−9)	−3 (−19)	−3 (−19)
Average precipitation inches (mm)	6.95 (177)	5.68 (144)	5.33 (135)	4.14 (105)	2.31 (59)	1.19 (30)	0.29 (7.4)	0.28 (7.1)	1.35 (34)	3.31 (84)	6.86 (174)	8.67 (220)	46.36 (1,178)
Average precipitation days (≥ 0.01 in)	19.8	16.4	17.9	14.6	10.8	6.7	2.0	1.5	4.6	11.6	18.9	20.7	145.5
Source: NOAA

== Infrastructure ==
=== Utilities ===
The city of Veneta gets its drinking water from three deep wells located within the city limits. In 2013, a 24-inch (61 cm) pipeline was completed which connected the city of Veneta to the Eugene Water & Electric Board (EWEB), allowing the city to purchase surplus water from EWEB. The 10-mile (16 km) pipeline supplies the city with an extra 200,000 US gallons (760,000 L) of water per day and provides the city with 20% of its water supply.

== Recreation ==
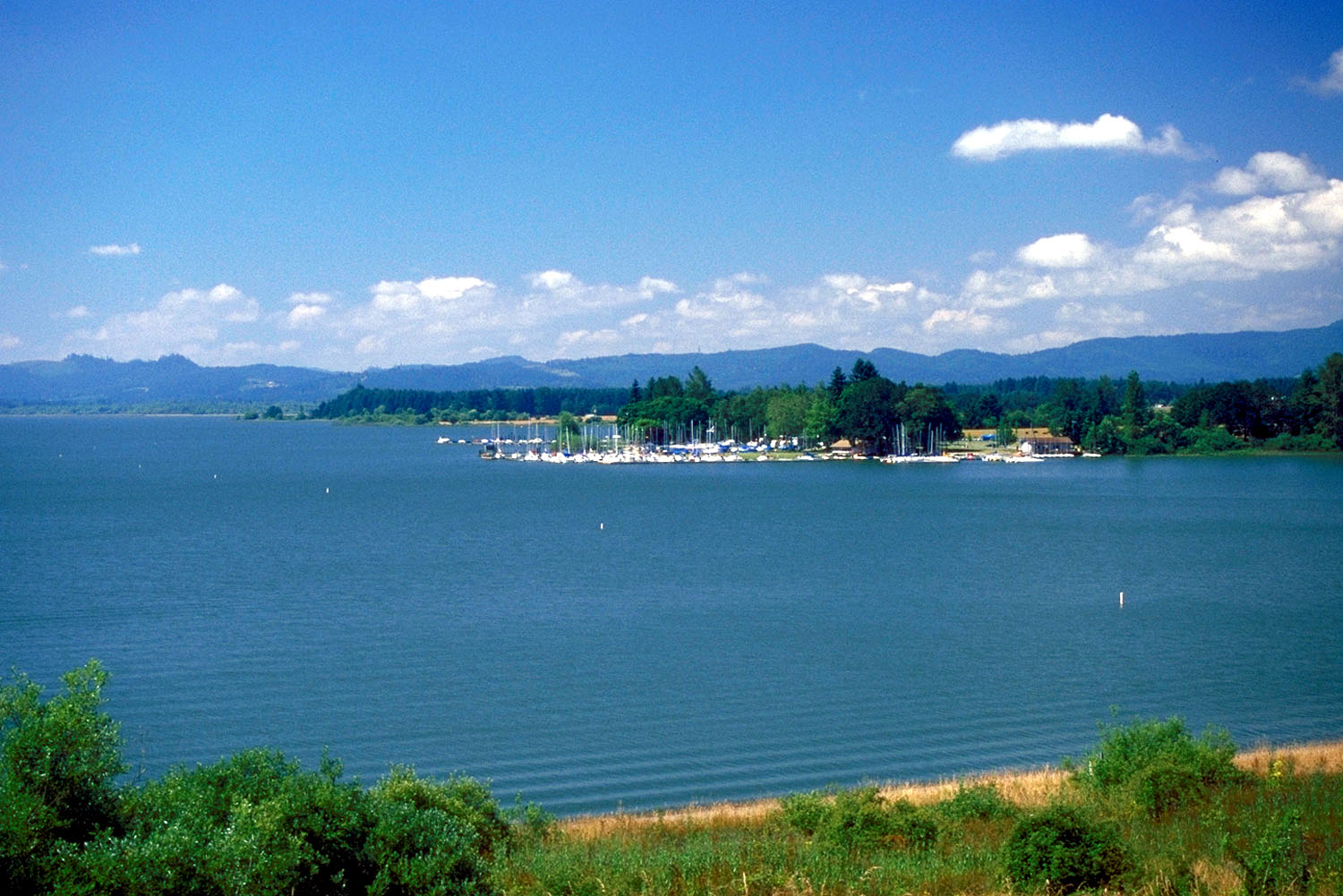
Fern Ridge Reservoir

Veneta is located adjacent to Fern Ridge Reservoir. The reservoir is popular for water sports, kayaking, sailing, fishing and swimming. Surrounding the reservoir is the Fern Ridge Wildlife Area, which is popular for bird watching and contains several parks with picnic areas, hiking trails, and some canoe and kayak access to the wetlands.

Inside the city is the outdoor, public swimming pool, which is open to swimmers during the summer months. Located off Territorial Highway is Veneta's skate park. The 7,000-square-foot (650 m^{2}) concrete park was constructed for local skateboarding and roller skating. The skate park is adjacent to basketball courts and a children's playground.

Veneta provides outdoor sports fields at the Bolton Hill Sports Complex located off Bolton Hill Road. This is an 11-acre (4.5 ha) sports area with baseball and soccer fields. The Bolton Hill Sports Complex have been used by the Territorial Sports Program (TSP) to provide baseball and soccer activities for local youth.

== Demographics ==
Historical population
Census	Pop.	Note	%±
1970	1,377		—
1980	2,449		77.9%
1990	2,519		2.9%
2000	2,755		9.4%
2010	4,561		65.6%
2020	5,214		14.3%
U.S. Decennial Census

=== 2020 census ===
As of the 2020 census, Veneta had a population of 5,214. The median age was 38.7 years. 24.4% of residents were under the age of 18 and 15.9% of residents were 65 years of age or older. For every 100 females there were 97.0 males, and for every 100 females age 18 and over there were 94.2 males age 18 and over.

99.7% of residents lived in urban areas, while 0.3% lived in rural areas.

There were 1,927 households in Veneta, of which 34.6% had children under the age of 18 living in them. Of all households, 52.0% were married-couple households, 16.1% were households with a male householder and no spouse or partner present, and 22.6% were households with a female householder and no spouse or partner present. About 20.2% of all households were made up of individuals and 9.1% had someone living alone who was 65 years of age or older.

There were 1,979 housing units, of which 2.6% were vacant. Among occupied housing units, 75.5% were owner-occupied and 24.5% were renter-occupied. The homeowner vacancy rate was 0.4% and the rental vacancy rate was 2.1%.

Racial composition as of the 2020 census
Race	Number	Percent
White	4,382	84.0%
Black or African American	50	1.0%
American Indian and Alaska Native	41	0.8%
Asian	47	0.9%
Native Hawaiian and Other Pacific Islander	7	0.1%
Some other race	123	2.4%
Two or more races	564	10.8%
Hispanic or Latino (of any race)	449	8.6%

=== 2010 census ===
As of the census of 2010, there were 4,561 people, 1,730 households, and 1,241 families living in the city. The population density was 1,774.7 inhabitants per square mile (685.2/km^{2}). There were 1,830 housing units at an average density of 712.1 per square mile (274.9/km^{2}). The racial makeup of the city was 91.8% White, 0.4% African American, 1.4% Native American, 0.8% Asian, 0.2% Pacific Islander, 1.9% from other races, and 3.6% from two or more races. Hispanic or Latino of any race were 5.5% of the population.

There were 1,730 households, of which 36.3% had children under the age of 18 living with them, 52.9% were married couples living together, 13.0% had a female householder with no husband present, 5.8% had a male householder with no wife present, and 28.3% were non-families. 20.5% of all households were made up of individuals, and 6.2% had someone living alone who was 65 years of age or older. The average household size was 2.62 and the average family size was 2.98.

The median age in the city was 35.2 years. 25.4% of residents were under the age of 18; 7.5% were between the ages of 18 and 24; 30.4% were from 25 to 44; 26% were from 45 to 64; and 10.7% were 65 years of age or older. The gender makeup of the city was 49.3% male and 50.7% female.

=== 2000 census ===
As of the census of 2000, there were 2,755 people, 966 households, and 732 families living in the city. The population density was 1,035.5 inhabitants per square mile (399.8/km^{2}). There were 1,015 housing units at an average density of 381.5 per square mile (147.3/km^{2}). The racial makeup of the city was 92.92% White, 0.25% African American, 1.38% Native American, 0.65% Asian, 0.04% Pacific Islander, 0.91% from other races, and 3.85% from two or more races. Hispanic or Latino of any race were 4.17% of the population.

There were 966 households, out of which 43.7% had children under the age of 18 living with them, 56.7% were married couples living together, 13.3% had a female householder with no husband present, and 24.2% were non-families. 18.4% of all households were made up of individuals, and 6.3% had someone living alone who was 65 years of age or older. The average household size was 2.85 and the average family size was 3.23.

In the city, the population was spread out, with 33.0% under the age of 18, 7.7% from 18 to 24, 30.5% from 25 to 44, 21.3% from 45 to 64, and 7.5% who were 65 years of age or older. The median age was 33 years. For every 100 females, there were 95.9 males. For every 100 females age 18 and over, there were 93.2 males.

The median income for a household in the city was $37,326, and the median income for a family was $40,909. Males had a median income of $33,897 versus $18,730 for females. The per capita income for the city was $16,239. About 11.4% of families and 9.7% of the population were below the poverty line, including 16.2% of those under age 18 and 7.2% of those age 65 or over.

== Education ==
The community is in the Fern Ridge School District 28J. This includes Veneta Elementary School and West Lane Charter School.
