= John Bernhard Leiberg =

Swedish-American botanist (1853–1913)

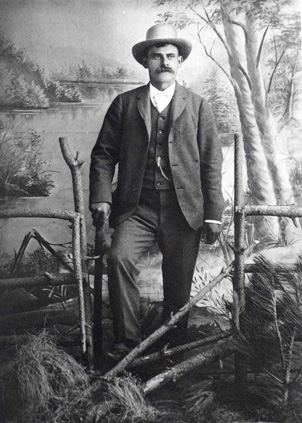
- Leiberg collecting for the "Flora of Idaho" in 1870, age 17
- Born: October 7, 1853; Malmö, Sweden
- Died: October 28, 1913 (aged 60); Leaburg, Oregon
- Occupations: Bryologist, forester, and botanical explorer

John Bernhard Leiberg (7 October 1853 – 28 October 1913) was a Swedish-American botanical explorer, forester, and bryologist. He was a self-taught naturalist who worked in the northwestern United States.

== Biography ==
Leiberg was born in Malmö, Sweden. He came to the United States in 1868 and settled near Lake Coeur d'Alene, Idaho. He spent the first part of his career as an explorer and plant collector for various flora projects mainly in Idaho, Washington, Oregon, and Nevada. Later he worked with the United States Geological Survey. With little formal education, at age 17 he began publishing plant collections and in 1884 he and his wife, Dr. Carrie E (Marvin) Leiberg (1852-1936), settled in the Lake Pend Oreille, Idaho Territory.

He supplied specimens to the New York Botanical Garden and in 1892 he spent the winter in Hamilton, Montana. He worked as a field botanist for Frederick Vernon Coville (1867–1937), curator of the United States National Herbarium. In 1897 he was transferred to the United States Geological Survey and assigned to examine the area of the 6,480 square miles (16,800 km^{2}) Bitterroot Forest Reserve which later became National Forests in Montana and Idaho. The reserves had been expanded by President Grover Cleveland by his February 22, 1897, proclamation. He surveyed the Bitterroot reserve in 1897 and 1898 and wrote the 19th and 20th annual reports for the US Geological Survey describing the topography, trees and mapping locations in an area previously relatively undocumented. From 1900 to 1904 he published descriptions of several other western forest reserves.

Leiberg contributed to and authored many publications including The Bitterroot Forest Reserve (U.S. Geological survey. 1899) and The Priest River Forest Reserve (U.S. Geological survey. 1899) together with many forestry related works. He edited and distributed two exsiccatae, namely Musci Leibergiani. Ex Herb. Columbia College, N.Y. and Mosses from Kootnai Co., Idaho. Distributed from the Herbarium of Columbia College.

Leiberg left government service in 1906 and briefly settled on a farm near Leaburg on the McKenzie River east of Eugene in Lane County, Oregon. He died at the age of 60 in 1913. Prior to his death, Leiberg gave his personal herbarium to the University of Oregon.

== List of plants named after him ==
A number of plant species have the epitaph "leibergii" in his honor.

- Nymphaea leibergii
- Dichanthelium leibergii (syn. Panicum leibergii)
- Aconitum leibergii
- Sedum leibergii
- Erigeron leibergii
- Brachythecium leibergii
- Phacelia leibergii
- Trifolium leibergii
- Bulbophyllum leibergii

== Related reading ==
- Jack Nisbet (2018) The Dreamer and the Doctor. A Forest Lover and a Physician on the Edge of the Frontier (Sasquatch Books) ISBN 9781632172037
