= Penn, Oregon =

Unincorporated community in the state of Oregon, United States

- Unincorporated community
- Location within Oregon Location within the United States
- Coordinates: 44°01′46″N 123°31′47″W
- Country: United States
- State: Oregon
- County: Lane
- Elevation: 463 ft (141 m)
- Time zone: UTC-8 (Pacific (PST))
  - Summer (DST): UTC-7 (PDT)
- Area codes: 458 and 541
- GNIS feature ID: 1166695
- Coordinates and elevation from Geographic Names Information System

Penn is an unincorporated community and former railway station in Lane County, in the U.S. state of Oregon. It was named for the Penn Timber Company, which operated in the vicinity.

Penn lies along Penn Road between Walton and Flagg in the Central Oregon Coast Range east of Florence. Wildcat Creek, a tributary of the Siuslaw River, flows by Penn.

The name of the post office for Penn was McGlynn. Postal officials rejected Penn as the name for the office because it might be confused with other entities. They approved McGlynn, named after Thomas McGlynn, who owned the land where the post office was established. The McGlynn post office opened in 1923 and closed in 1938.
