= Austa, Oregon =

Unincorporated community in the state of Oregon, United States

- Unincorporated community
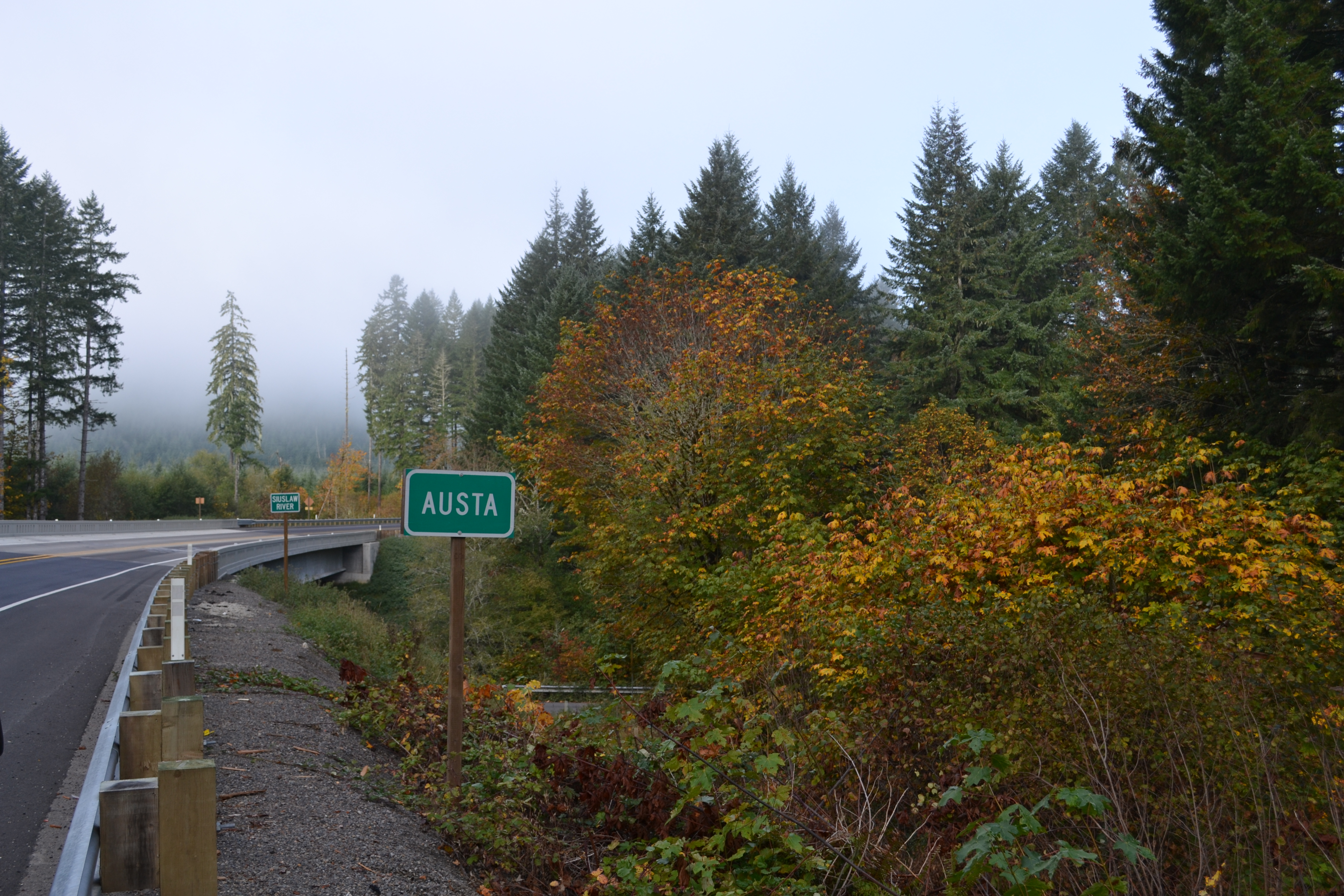

- Location within Oregon Location within the United States
- Coordinates: 44°00′08″N 123°39′03″W
- Country: United States
- State: Oregon
- County: Lane
- Elevation: 354 ft (108 m)
- Time zone: UTC-8 (Pacific (PST))
  - Summer (DST): UTC-7 (PDT)
- ZIP code: 97490
- Area codes: 458 and 541
- GNIS feature ID: 1166609

Austa is an unincorporated community in Lane County, Oregon, United States, on Oregon Route 126, approximately 6 miles (10 km) west of Walton. Wildcat Creek empties into the Siuslaw River at this site, and the Lane County Park Service maintains a boat ramp. Austa was named after Austa Grace Yingling where she met her husband William John Vaughn, who drove a stage coach along the river.

== See also ==
- Wildcat Creek Bridge
- Linslaw, Oregon
