= Wildcat Creek Bridge =

Covered bridge in Oregon, US

- U.S. National Register of Historic Places
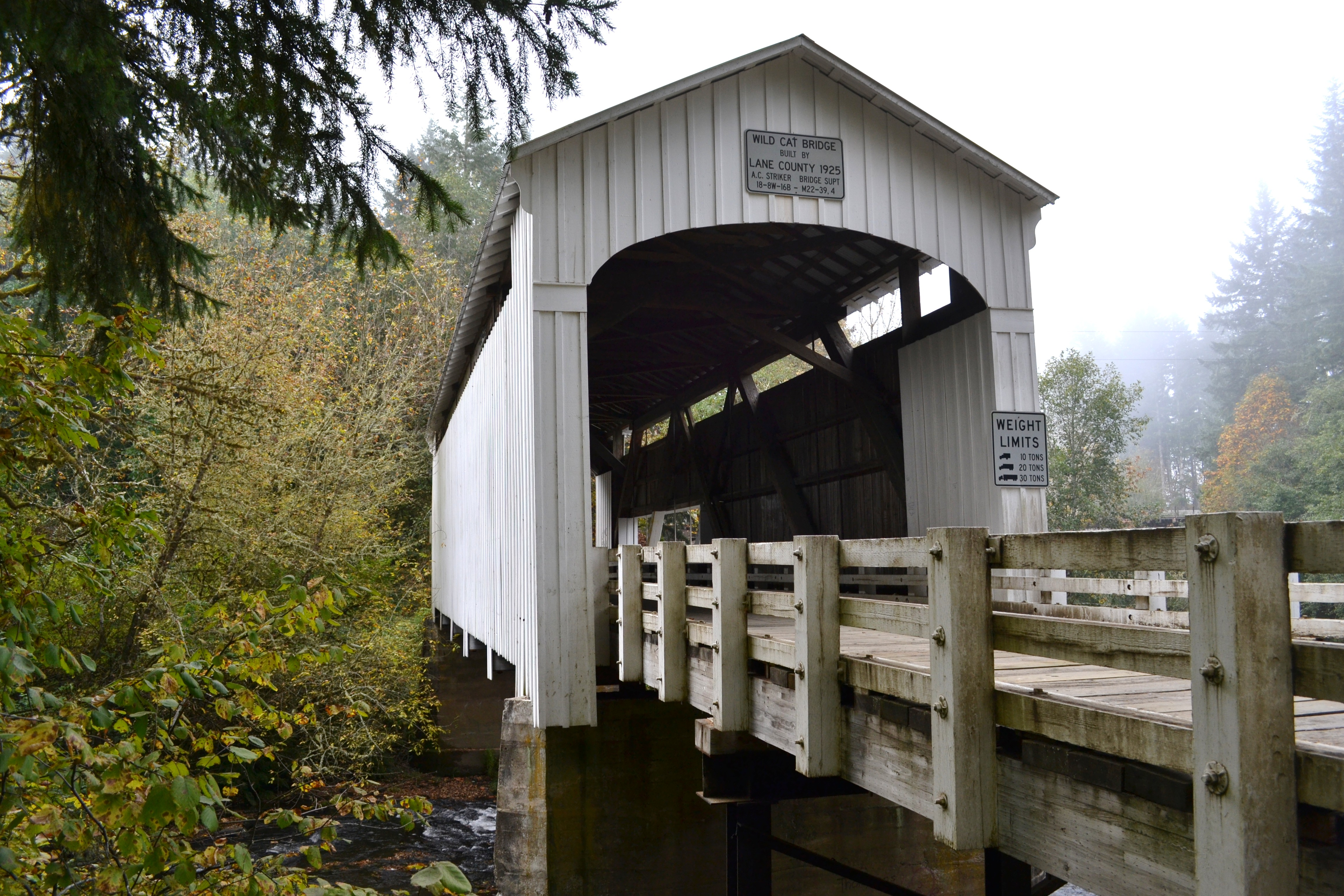

- Location within Oregon Location within the United States
- Nearest city: Walton, Oregon
- Coordinates: 44°0′13″N 123°39′9″W
- Area: 5,700 square feet (530 m^{2})
- Built: 1925
- Architectural style: Howe Truss
- MPS: Oregon Covered Bridges TR
- NRHP reference No.: 79002089
- Added to NRHP: November 29, 1979

Wildcat Creek Bridge is a covered bridge built in 1925 at Austa, near Walton, in the U.S. state of Oregon. It uses Howe truss engineering and was listed on the National Register of Historic Places in 1979. The 75-foot (23 m) bridge carries Austa Road over Wildcat Creek near its confluence with the Siuslaw River.

The bridge is among those for which Lane County minted commemorative coins between 2005 and July 2012 for sale to the public to raise funds to maintain and repair covered bridges.Lane County has 17 covered bridges, 14 of which are active. Through 2012, the county issued 325 Wildcat Creek Bridge coins.

== See also ==
- List of bridges on the National Register of Historic Places in Oregon
- List of Oregon covered bridges
