= Trent, Oregon =

- Census-designated place
- Location within Oregon Location within the United States
- Coordinates: 43°56′48″N 122°51′50″W
- Country: United States
- State: Oregon
- County: Lane

Area
  - Total: 1.61 sq mi (4.18 km^{2})
  - Land: 1.58 sq mi (4.10 km^{2})
  - Water: 0.031 sq mi (0.08 km^{2})
- Elevation: 614 ft (187 m)

Population (2020)
  - Total: 339
  - Density: 214.0/sq mi (82.63/km^{2})
- Time zone: UTC-8 (Pacific (PST))
  - Summer (DST): UTC-7 (PDT)
- ZIP Code: 97431 (Dexter)
- Area codes: 541/458
- FIPS code: 41-74550
- GNIS feature ID: 2812887

Trent is an unincorporated community and census-designated place (CDP) in Lane County, Oregon, United States. It was first listed as a CDP prior to the 2020 census.

As of the 2020 census, Trent had a population of 339.

The CDP is in central Lane County, along Rattlesnake Creek, a north-flowing tributary of the Middle Fork Willamette River. The Middle Fork forms the northeast boundary of the CDP. Oregon Route 58 runs through the southern part of Trent, leading northwest 14 miles (23 km) to Eugene, the county seat. To the southeast, Route 58 immediately passes through Dexter and leads 27 miles (43 km) to Oakridge.

== Demographics ==
Historical population
| Census | Pop. | Note | %± |
|---|---|---|---|
| 2020 | 339 | | — |
U.S. Decennial Census
