= Lost Creek (Middle Fork Willamette River tributary) =

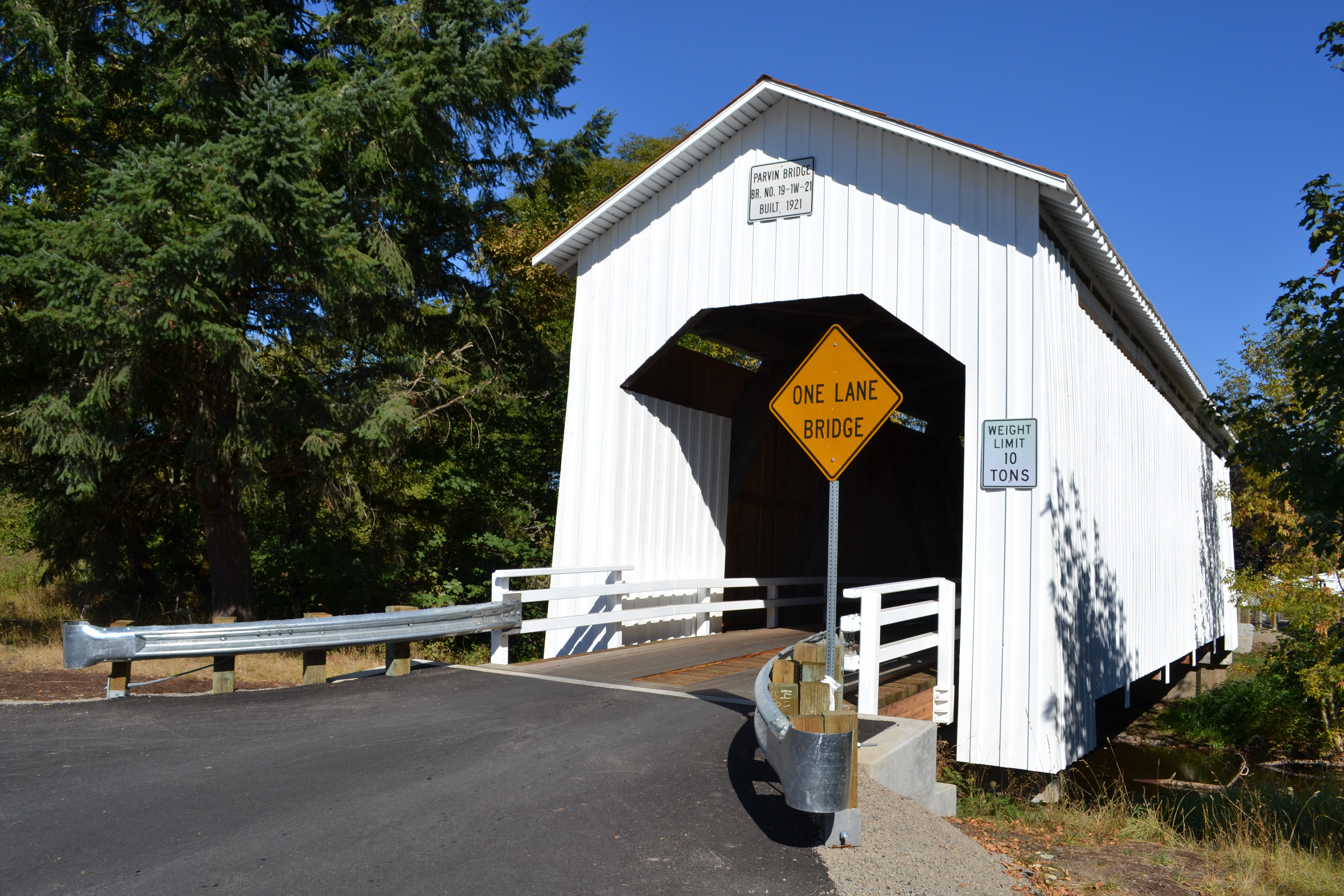
- Parvin Bridge spans Lost Creek south of Dexter

- Location of the mouth of Lost Creek in Oregon
- Etymology: Probably for its relative seclusion

Location
- Country: United States
- State: Oregon
- County: Lane

Physical characteristics
- Source: Cascade Range foothills
  - location: near Mount June, between Dorena Lake and Lookout Point Lake
  - coordinates: 43°48′16″N 122°42′24″W
  - elevation: 3,235 ft (986 m)
- Mouth: Middle Fork Willamette River
  - location: downstream of Lowell
  - coordinates: 43°56′57″N 122°51′03″W
  - elevation: 604 ft (184 m)

Lost Creek is a tributary of the Middle Fork Willamette River in the U.S. state of Oregon. It begins in the Cascade Range foothills between Dorena Lake and Lookout Point Lake and flows generally north to meet the river downstream of Lowell. Along the way, it passes by the rural community of Dexter, then under Oregon Route 58, and through part of Elijah Bristow State Park. Named tributaries of Lost Creek from source to mouth are Guiley, Gossage, Carr, Middle, Anthony, and Wagner creeks.

== Name ==
Oregon Geographic Names (OGN) says the north–south valley through which the creek flows was known as Lost Valley during the days of early settlement. Illustrated History of Lane County says Elijah Bristow named the valley, according to OGN, which says the name probably stemmed from the valley's seclusion.

== Covered bridge ==
The Parvin Bridge, a covered bridge, spans the creek south of Dexter. The 75-foot (23 m), single-lane structure carries Parvin Road over the water. Built in 1921, it was added to the National Register of Historic Places in 1979.

== See also ==
- List of rivers of Oregon
