= Parvin Bridge =

Covered bridge in Oregon, US

- U.S. National Register of Historic Places
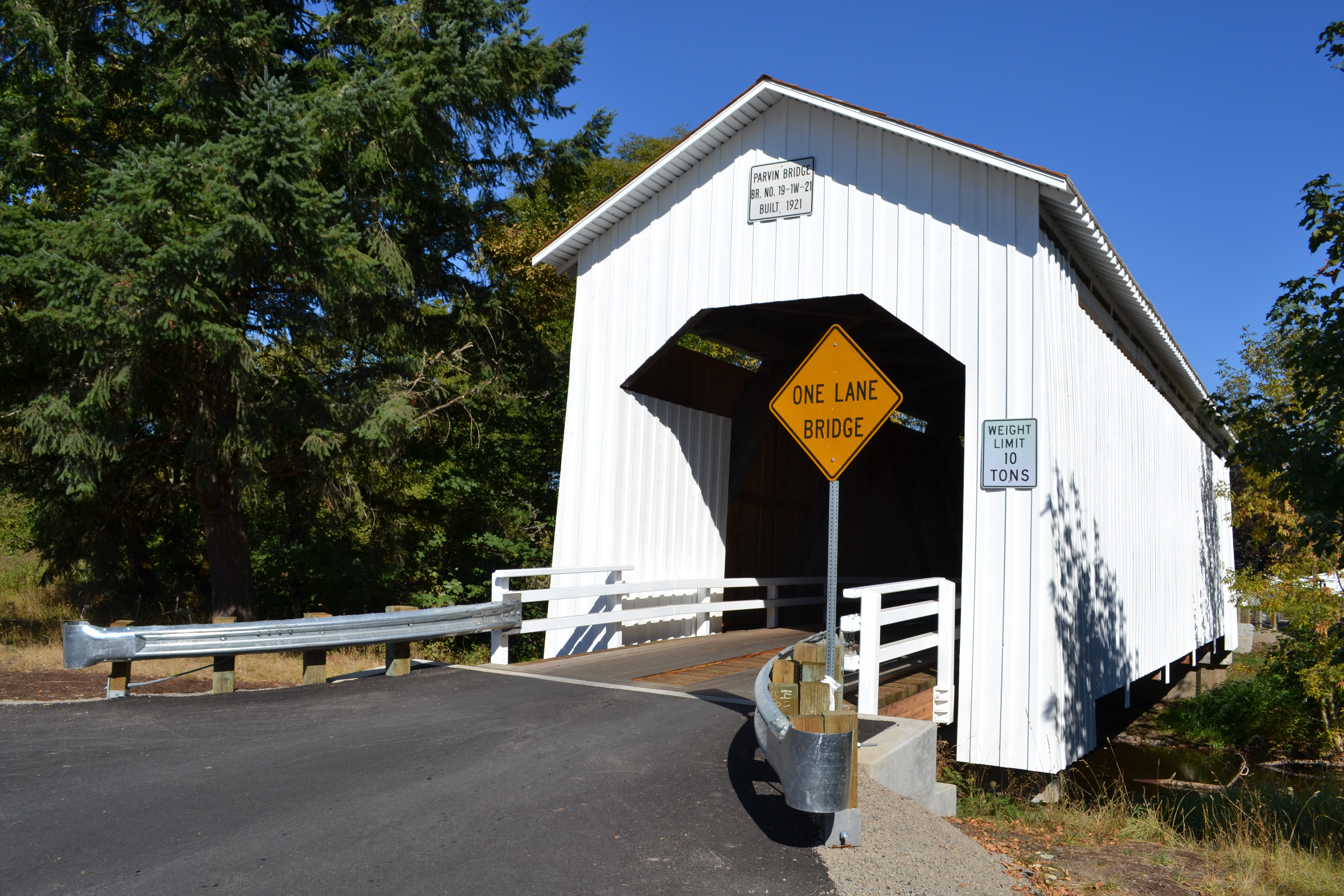
- Parvin Bridge

- Location within Oregon Location within the United States
- Nearest city: Dexter, Oregon
- Coordinates: 43°53′59″N 122°49′17″W
- Area: 0.1 acres (0.040 ha)
- Built: 1921
- Built by: George W. Breeding
- Architectural style: Howe truss
- MPS: Oregon Covered Bridges TR
- NRHP reference No.: 79003767
- Added to NRHP: November 29, 1979

The Parvin Bridge is a covered bridge located in Lane County, Oregon, U.S. near Dexter. It was built in 1921 as a single-lane 75-foot (23 m) bridge across Lost Creek, a tributary of the Middle Fork Willamette River.

The bridge was a replacement for a 66-foot (20 m) Howe truss design which failed a 1917 inspection by bridge inspector J. W. McArthur. He wrote, "An old bridge. Chords badly worm eaten. Downstream chord has been reinforced in middle by a timber bolted on. Wood is but little better than a powder from worm action. All signs indicate a new bridge in from 2 to 4 years."

George W. Breeding constructed the present bridge at the same site in 1921 for $3,617, equivalent to $65,300 today. It is also a Howe truss and includes a 62-foot (19 m) eastern approach and a 17-foot (5.2 m) western approach. Roadwork in the mid-1970s realigned the road to bypass the bridge, being accessible only to pedestrians afterwards. A dedication ceremony was held November 17, 1986, to reopen the renovated span to vehicle traffic with a 10-short-ton (9,100 kg) load limit.

The Parvin Bridge is listed on the National Register of Historic Places.

== See also ==
- List of bridges on the National Register of Historic Places in Oregon
- List of Oregon covered bridges
- National Register of Historic Places listings in Lane County, Oregon
