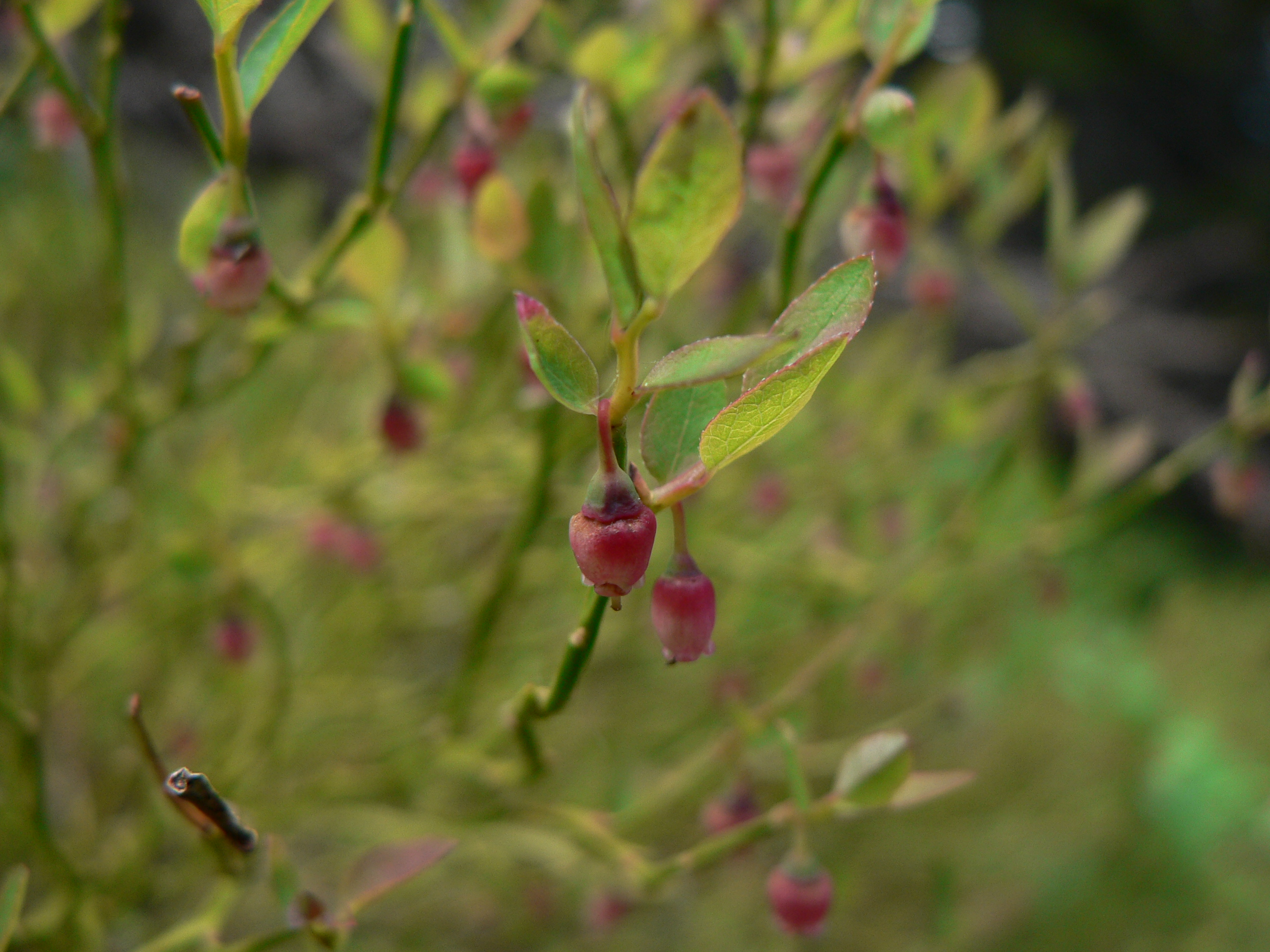

Conservation status
- Secure (NatureServe)

Scientific classification
- Kingdom: Plantae
- Clade: Tracheophytes
- Clade: Angiosperms
- Clade: Eudicots
- Clade: Asterids
- Order: Ericales
- Family: Ericaceae
- Genus: Vaccinium
- Species: V. scoparium

Binomial name
- Vaccinium scoparium Leiberg ex Coville 1897

Synonyms
- Vaccinium myrtillus var. microphyllum Hook. 1834 not Vaccinium microphyllum Reinw. ex Blume 1825; Vaccinium erythrococcum Rydb.

= Vaccinium scoparium =

Berry and plant

Vaccinium scoparium is a species of huckleberry known by the common names grouse whortleberry, grouseberry, and littleleaf huckleberry.

== Description ==
Vaccinium scoparium is a squat, bushy rhizomatous shrub growing no more than 0.5 meters (20 in) in height. It is matted and clumpy, and it spreads outward with the stems rooting at nodes where it comes in contact with moist substrate. The branches are broomlike when leaflike and new green twigs have sharp angles. The deciduous leaves are alternately arranged, the serrated oval leaf blades up to 1.4 centimeters (1/2 in) in length.

Solitary flowers occur in the leaf axils. They are urn-shaped, pink, and about 4 millimeters (3/16 in) long,

The fruit is a soft, bright red berry up to 6 mm (1/4 in) in width. It has a tart flavor.

=== Similar species ===
It resembles Vaccinium myrtillus, which has bluish berries.

== Distribution and habitat ==
It is native to western North America, primarily in the Rockies, Cascades, and Black Hills from British Columbia and Alberta south to far northern California to Colorado and New Mexico, and east to South Dakota. It grows in mountain habitat such as forests, meadows, and talus, occurring in subalpine and alpine climates at elevations of 700 to 3,000 m (2,300 to 9,800 ft). It is a common understory plant in many forested regions of the Rocky Mountains, being common to abundant in some areas.

== Ecology ==
This shrub provides food for many large mammal species, such as elk, mule deer, and bears, and many smaller animals, such as squirrels, foxes, skunks, and a variety of birds.

== Uses ==
The berries are edible and were used for food by many Native American groups, including the Kootenay, Okanogan, and Shuswap. They are small and difficult to collect in large quantities, and Native people likely used combs made of wood or fishbones to harvest them.
