= Inlow, Oregon =

Unincorporated community in the state of Oregon, United States

- Unincorporated community
- Location within Oregon
- Coordinates: 44°02′27″N 123°35′05″W
- Country: United States
- State: Oregon
- County: Lane
- Elevation: 436 ft (133 m)
- Time zone: UTC-8 (Pacific (PST))
  - Summer (DST): UTC-7 (PDT)
- ZIP code: 97490
- GNIS feature ID: 1164433

Inlow was the name of a post office in Lane County, Oregon, United States, on what is now Nelson Mountain Road near the confluence of Chickahominy and Nelson creeks, approximately one mile north of Walton. Inlow post office was established June 20, 1899, and was named for either Igo Inlow or his father, "Doc" Inlow. The office closed to Hale in 1901.
