= Old McKenzie Fish Hatchery =

- U.S. National Register of Historic Places
- U.S. Historic district
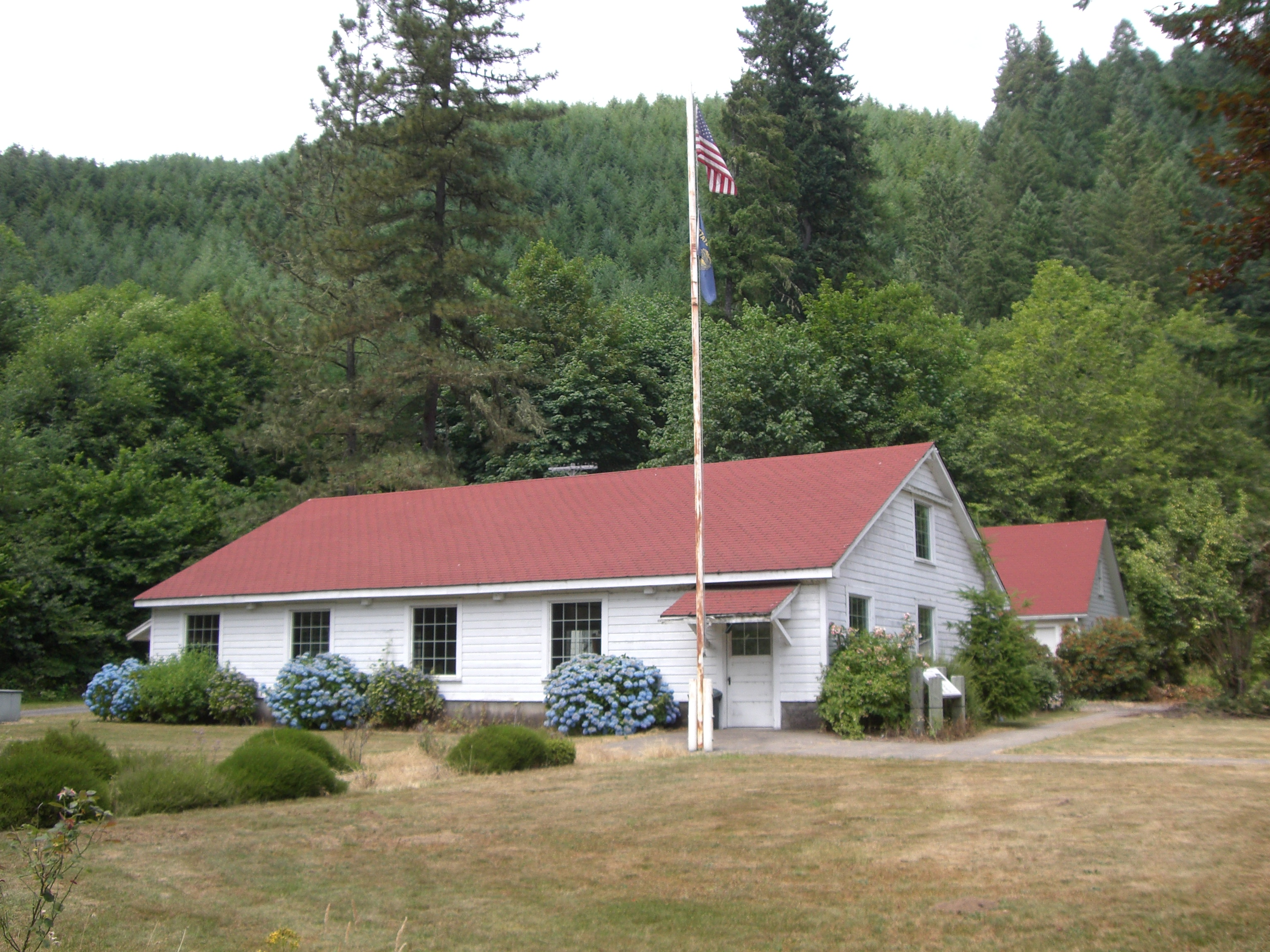
- This hatchery replaced a 1907 facility.

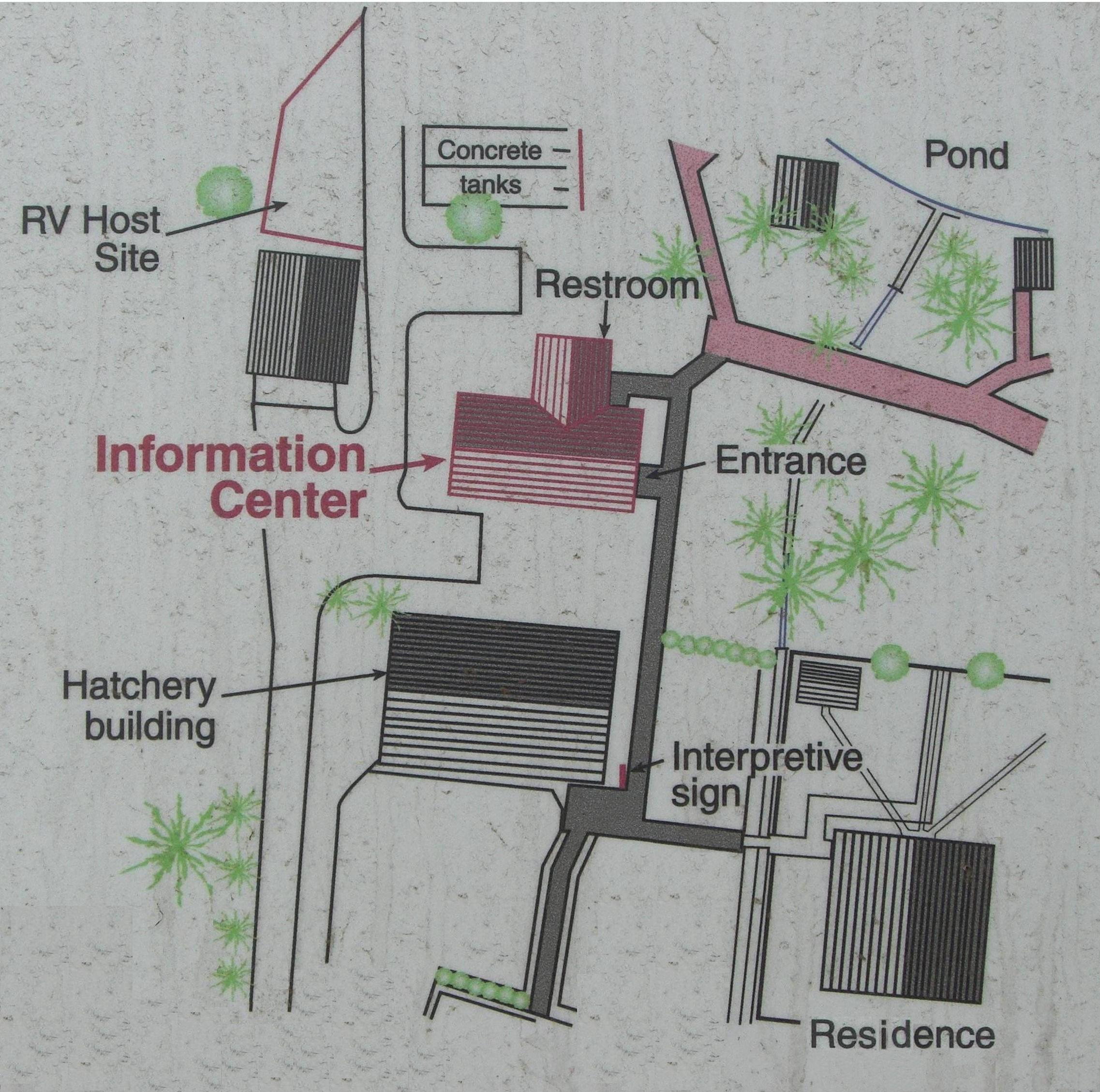
- Location: McKenzie River
- Nearest city: Vida, Oregon, USA
- Coordinates: 44.14194°N 122.60861°W
- Built: 1928
- NRHP reference No.: 96000142
- Added to NRHP: 1996

The Old McKenzie Fish Hatchery was used to raise trout and salmon for release into the McKenzie River in western Oregon in the United States. It is located near the unincorporated community of Vida in Lane County. The hatchery is closed, but the historic site is now a county park. It is also listed on the National Register of Historic Places.

== History ==
On March 6, 1907, the State of Oregon purchased land along the McKenzie River between Leaburg and Vida for a fish hatchery. The state paid $518.07 for the land. The original hatchery building was built by C.J. Buley. The facility was opened on May 11, 1907. The hatchery superintendent's house and other support buildings were also constructed at about the same time. The original hatchery building was replaced in 1928, but the superintendent's residence and several other original buildings still exist at the site.

The hatchery facilities were used by the State of Oregon to grow trout and salmon until the early 1950s. Over the years, it grew to be a large operation. In 1951, the hatchery collected 1,530,560 fish eggs for breeding. The state then decided to replace the old hatchery with a modern production facility. Between 1952 and 1953, the entire hatchery operation was moved to a new facility about a half-mile downstream from the original site adjacent to the Leaburg Dam. The old hatchery was closed in 1953.

In 1986, Lane County commissioned a study to determine if the abandoned hatchery site should be developed. The study found that the old McKenzie hatchery had historic and natural value, and recommended that the site be developed as a public park. Because of its unique architecture and importance to the history of the McKenzie River Valley, the Old McKenzie Fish Hatchery was listed on the National Register of Historic Places in 1996. In 2007, the Lane County Parks Advisory Committee endorsed a plan to expand the facilities at the site of the historic fish hatchery to include a small museum and an interpretive center.

== County park ==
Today, the Old McKenzie Fish Hatchery is a 46-acre (190,000 m^{2}) park operated by Lane County. The historic site has eight main buildings and seven minor structures. The main hatchery buildings have been renovated, and are used as an environmental education center. There are interpretive signs on the grounds that describe hatchery operations and highlight some remaining artifacts. It is also home to the McKenzie River Chamber of Commerce Information Center. Because it is located just off Highway 126 (also known as the McKenzie River Highway), the hatchery is a popular rest stop for travelers. At the site, there are picnic tables, restrooms, drinking water, and parking. In addition, the facilities meet all the requirements of the Americans with Disabilities Act.

The Friends of the Old McKenzie Fish Hatchery work with the Lane County Parks Division to develop and maintain the historic site. According to its charter, the group was established to "perpetuate and maintain the Old McKenzie Fish Hatchery to achieve the highest quality for the public benefit; to enhance the historic features of the property…to encourage use of the site for educational purposes, and to provide facilities for the public enjoyment and use of its natural and historic features."

== See also ==
- National Register of Historic Places listings in Lane County, Oregon
