= Wildcat Creek (Siuslaw River tributary) =

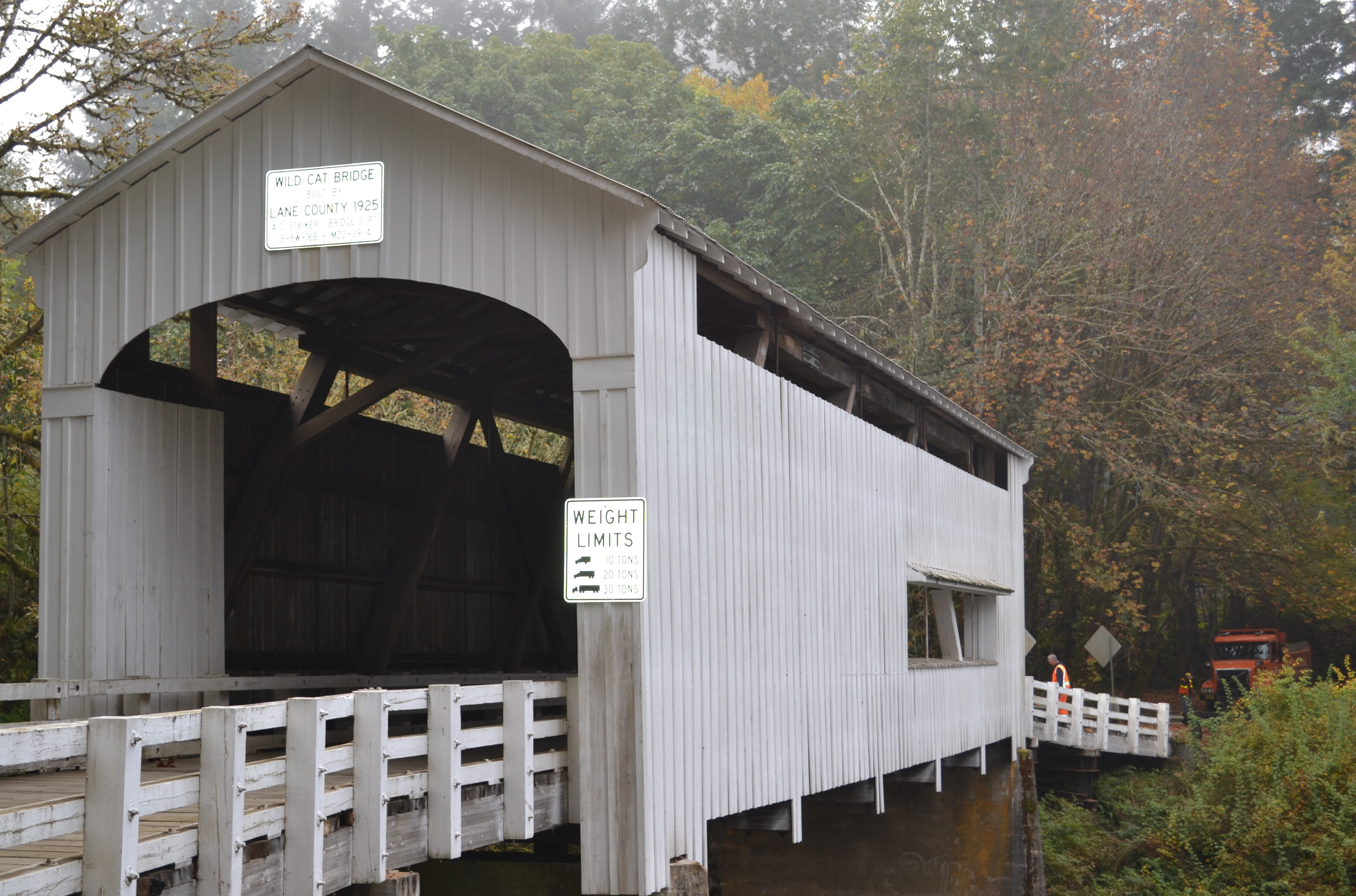
- Wildcat Creek Bridge at Austa

- Location of the mouth of Wildcat Creek in Oregon

Location
- Country: United States
- State: Oregon
- Region: Siuslaw National Forest
- County: Lane

Physical characteristics
- Source: south of Vaughn
  - coordinates: 43°59′26″N 123°25′37″W
  - elevation: 1,098 ft (335 m)
- Mouth: Siuslaw River
  - location: Austa
  - coordinates: 44°00′12″N 123°39′17″W
  - elevation: 292 ft (89 m)
- Length: 16 mi (26 km)
- Basin size: 54.5 sq mi (141 km^{2})

Wildcat Creek is a 16-mile-long (26 km) creek in Lane County, Oregon, United States within the Siuslaw National Forest. The creek empties into the Siuslaw River at Austa on Oregon Route 126.

In the 19th century, the stream was named Walton Creek after Joshua J. Walton, a lawyer, Lane County judge, and member of the University of Oregon's board of regents. In the 20th century, the name was changed to Wildcat Creek.

== Course ==
From its source, the creek flows west, then north to near Penn Road, where it receives Warden Creek from the right. Turning west again, the creek receives Salt Creek from the right and Bulmer Creek from the left before reaching the unincorporated community of Penn. Penn Road parallels the creek along this stretch to slightly beyond Penn, where the smaller road intersects Route 126. Near this intersection, Fish Creek enters from the right at about river mile (RM) 10 or river kilometer (RK) 16. Flowing west parallel to the highway, which is on its right, Wildcat Creek passes Walton, where it receives Chickahominy Creek from the right.

Downstream of Walton, Wildcat Creek turns south. Walker, Kirk, and Schultz creeks enter from the right, and then Pataha Creek enters from the left at the unincorporated community of Globe. The creek turns west again and passes under Highway 126 before reaching Austa. At Austa, the creek passes under Wildcat Creek Bridge, which carries a county road, and enters the Siuslaw River about 45 miles (72 km) from its mouth on the Pacific Ocean.

== See also ==
- List of rivers of Oregon
