= Deerhorn, Oregon =

Unincorporated community in the state of Oregon, United States

Coordinates: 44°04′54″N 122°44′54″W

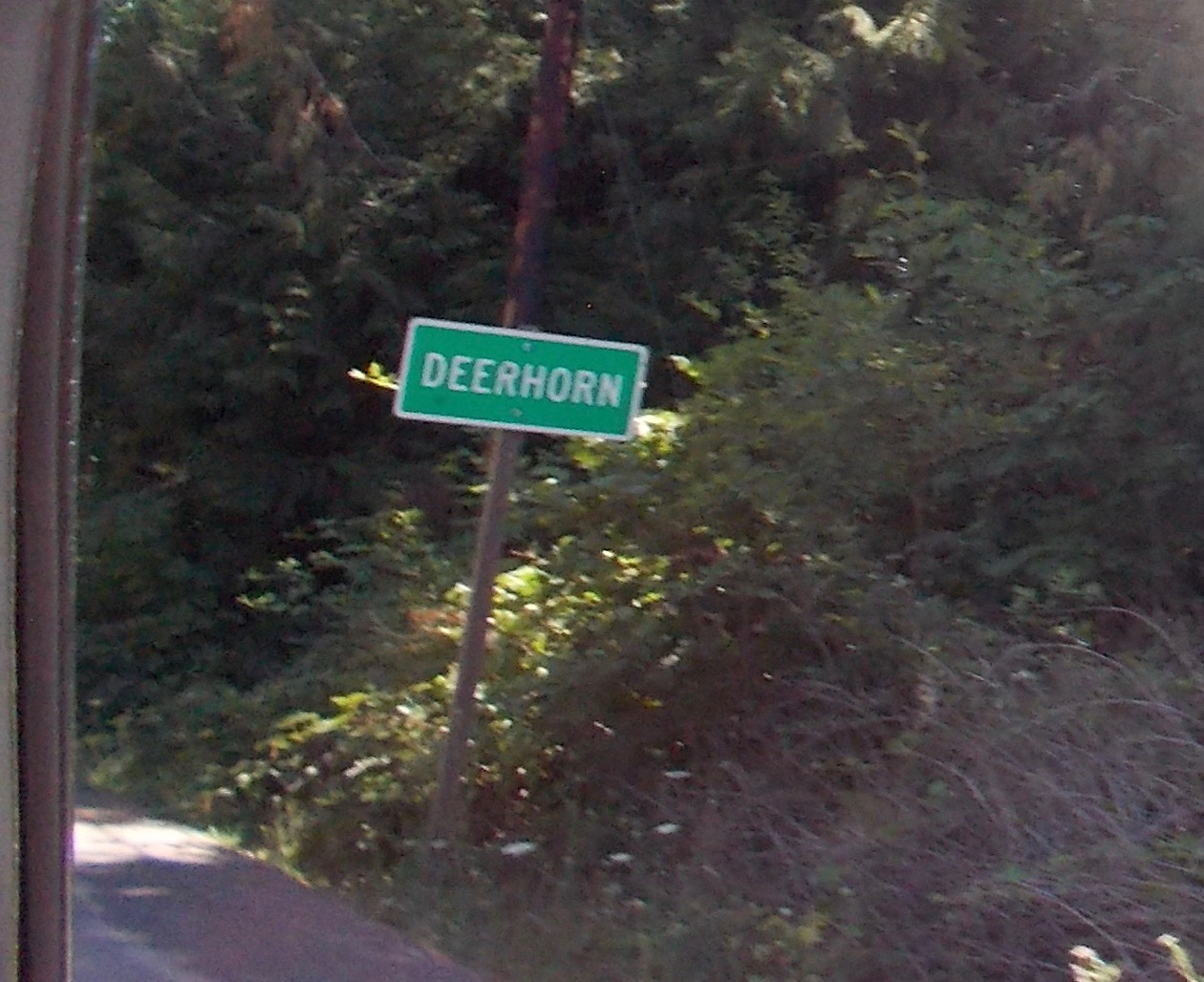
Deerhorn sign

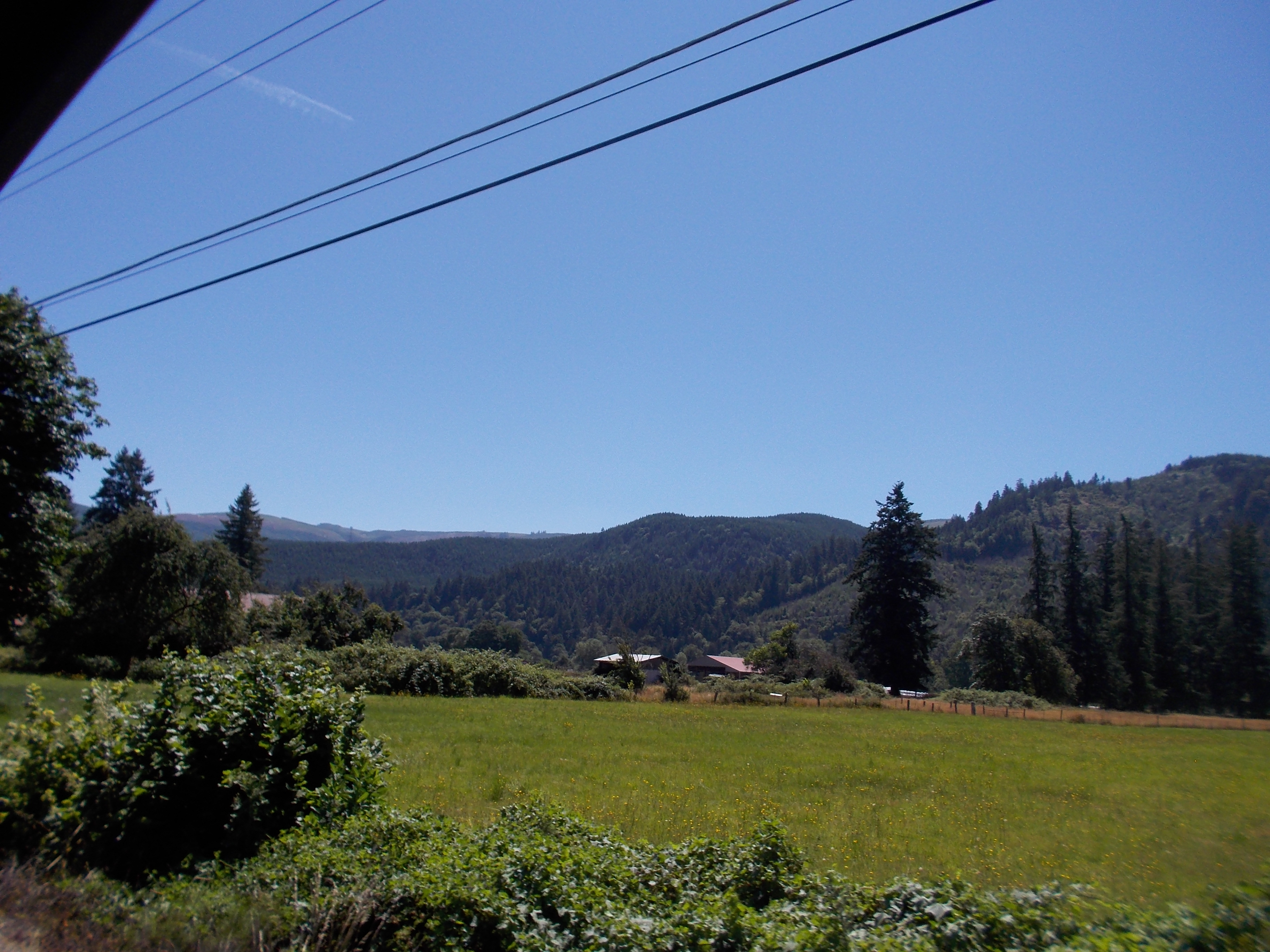
Farm in Deerhorn

Deerhorn is an unincorporated community in Lane County, Oregon, United States. It is about 4 miles (6 km) west of Leaburg on Oregon Route 126 in the McKenzie River valley.

Deerhorn had a post office from 1907 to 1913. The office was originally at Leaburg. In 1915, Deerhorn had a population of 75 and both elementary and high schools.
