= Mabel, Oregon =

Unincorporated community in the state of Oregon, United States

- Unincorporated community
- Location within Oregon Location within the United States
- Coordinates: 44°12′52″N 122°49′37″W
- Country: United States
- State: Oregon
- County: Lane
- Elevation: 607 ft (185 m)
- Time zone: UTC-8 (Pacific (PST))
  - Summer (DST): UTC-7 (PDT)
- ZIP code: 97454
- Area codes: 458 and 541
- GNIS feature ID: 1123653

Mabel is an unincorporated community in Lane County, Oregon, United States. Its post office was established around 1878 with Alfred Drury as postmaster, and closed in 1957. The community was named after Maud Mabel Drury, the first postmaster's daughter.
