= Lost Valley Educational Center =

Ecovillage and intentional community in Dexter, Oregon, United States

Coordinates: 43.891182°N 122.82807°W

Lost Valley Educational Center is an intentional community and ecovillage located on 87 acres (350,000 m^{2}) acres of mostly forested land in Dexter, Oregon, United States, approximately 18 miles (29 km) southeast of Eugene. The center was founded in 1989 and is located on the grounds of the old headquarters of the Shiloh Youth Revival Centers.

== About Lost Valley ==
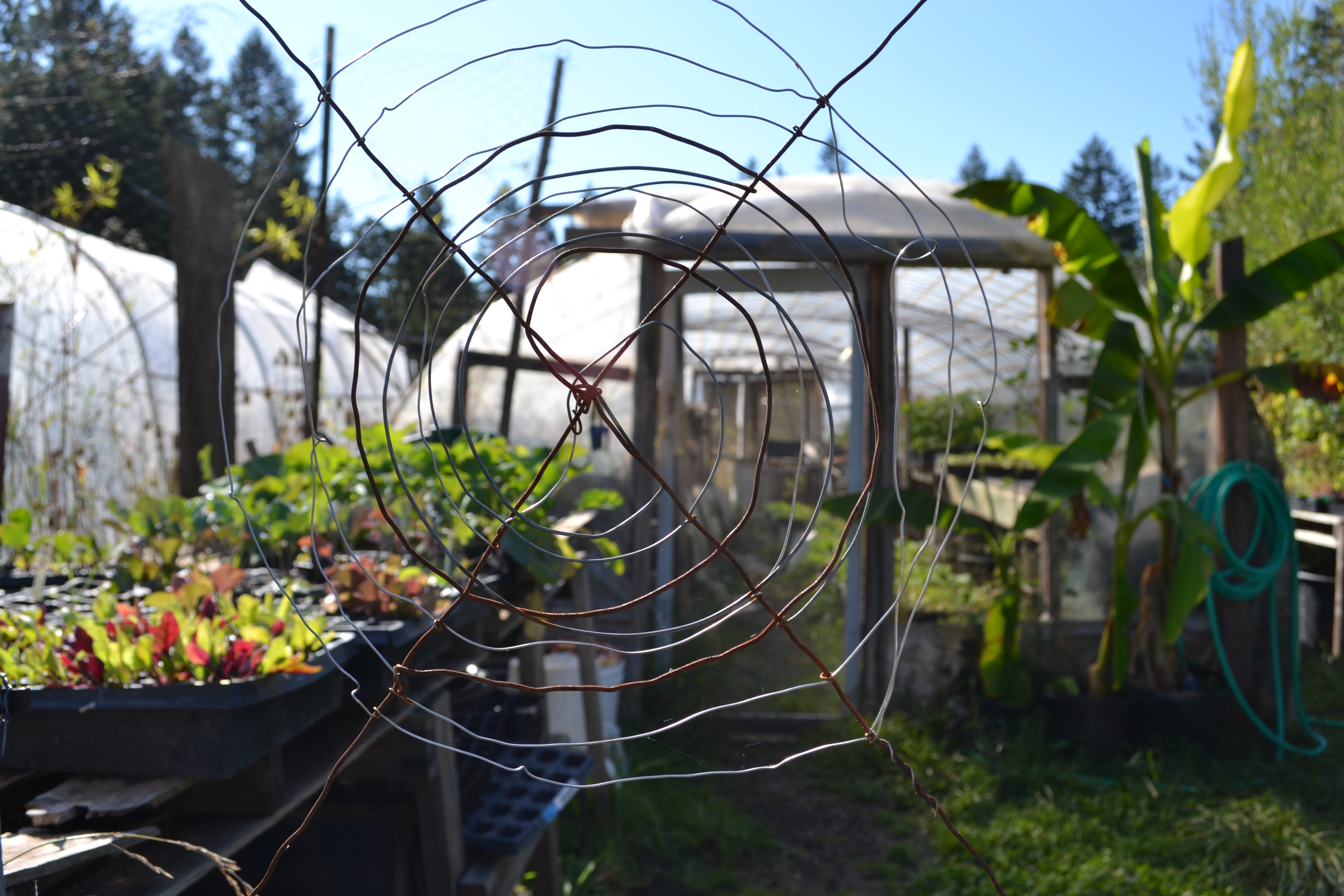
Starts for the Green House

The nonprofit educational center is dedicated to the practices of nonviolent communication and personal growth, permaculture, sustainability, and simple living. Its mission is to create and foster mutually beneficial relations between humans and all parts of the web of existence. Between 20 and 30% of the food consumed on site is grown in its gardens. Some of the natural features on the land are gardens, a large meadow, forests, ponds, and a creek. Some of its projects include numerous natural building material structures, solar ovens, solar showers, beekeeping, a hot tub, and a sauna. It hosts workshops throughout the year, such as the Holistic Sustainability Semester and the Permaculture Design Certificate course.

== History ==
=== Origin ===
The site of Lost Valley was originally a part of the Shiloh Youth Revival Centers. Known as "The Land" to its members, the original late '60s buildings were made from the recycling of donated houses.

In the 1980s the Shiloh organization sold the property to a group of people intent on starting their own eco-village. The intent was for the Lost Valley Educational Center to be both a community and an educational center.

For years the main educational focus of Lost Valley was a heart-centered workshop program called, "Naka Ima" which evolved into an evolutionary interpersonal growth workshop called, Heart of Now, which is currently run off-site, in the city of Eugene.

== Other Communities in Oregon ==
Lost Valley is one of several intentional ecovillage communities in Oregon, including Aprovecho research center, located in the outskirts of Cottage Grove; Cougar Mountain Farms and Maitreya Ecovillage located in nearby Eugene.

== Gallery ==
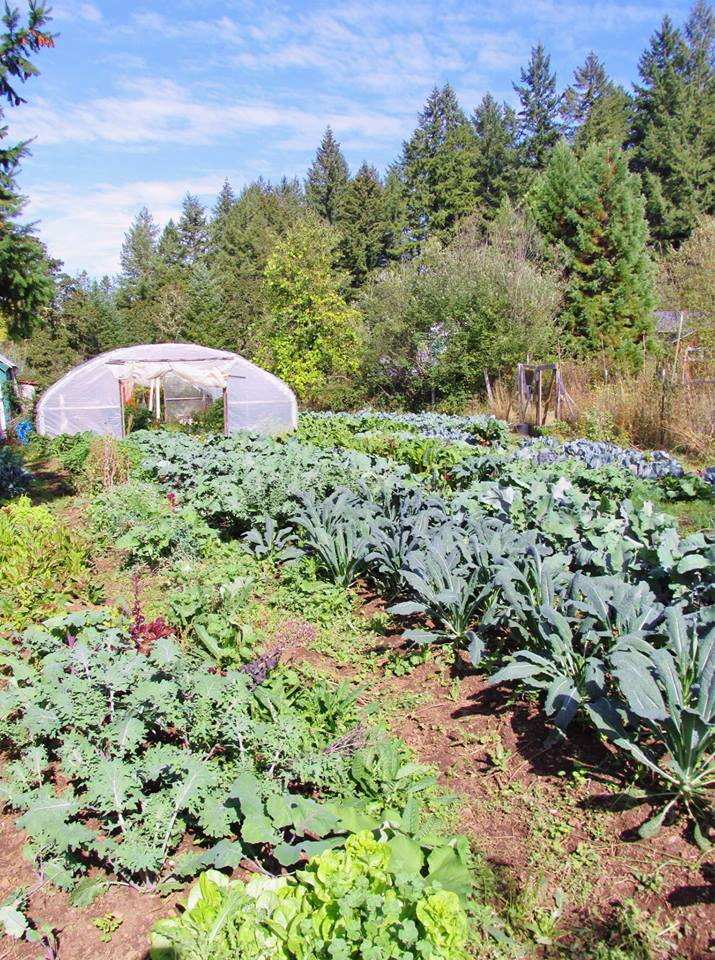

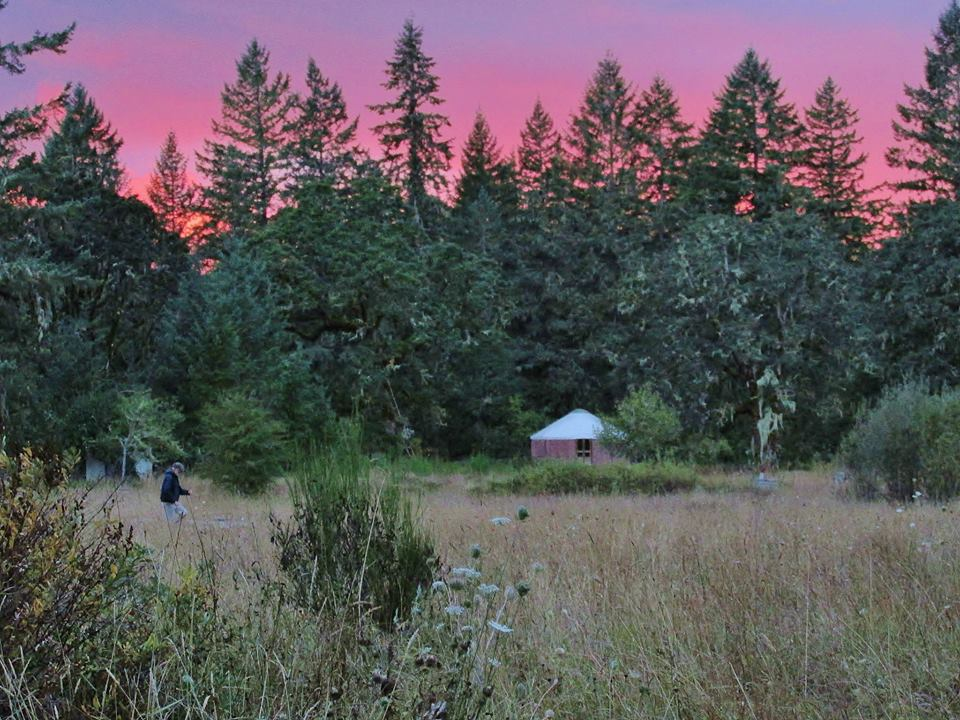

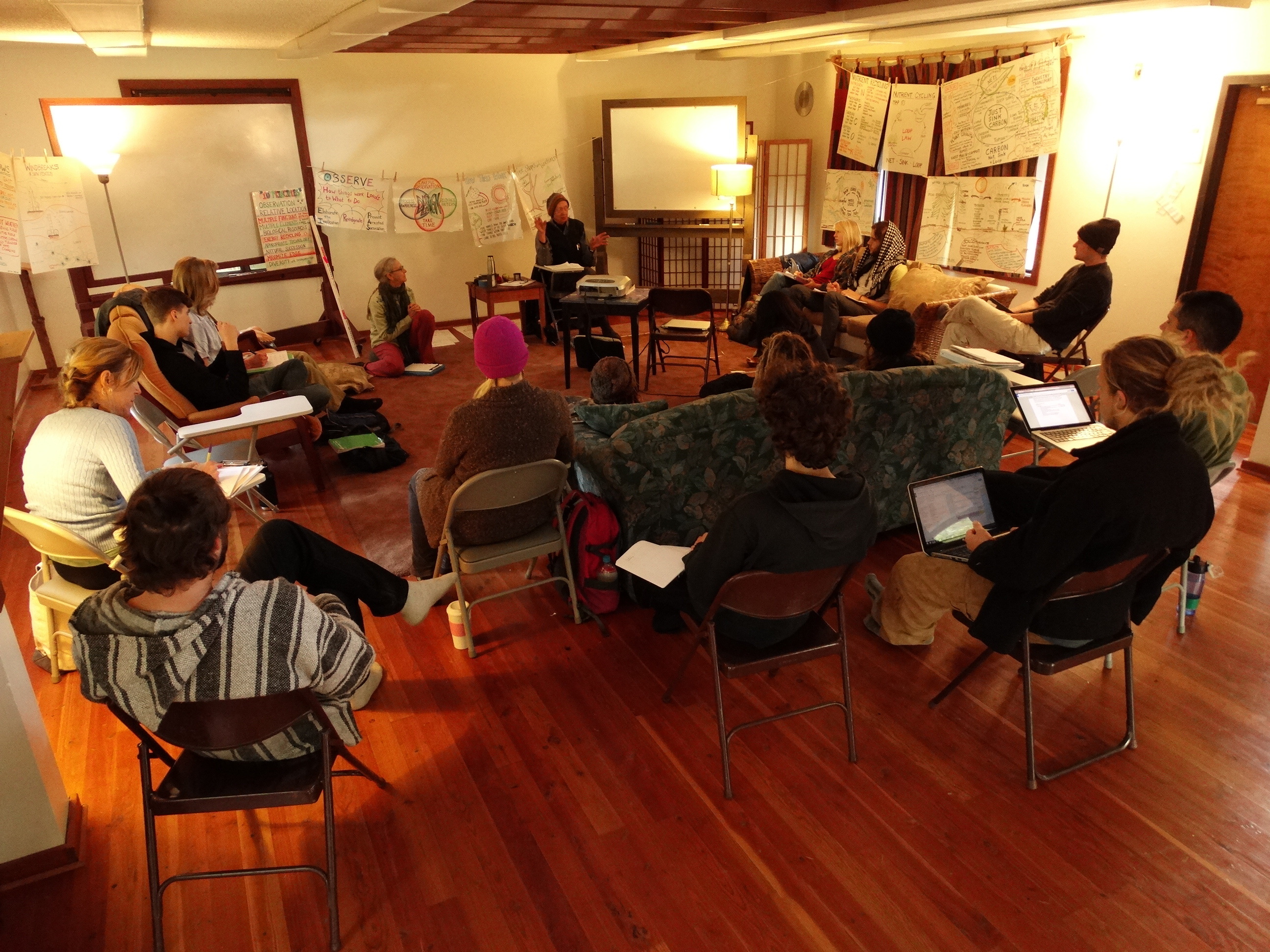

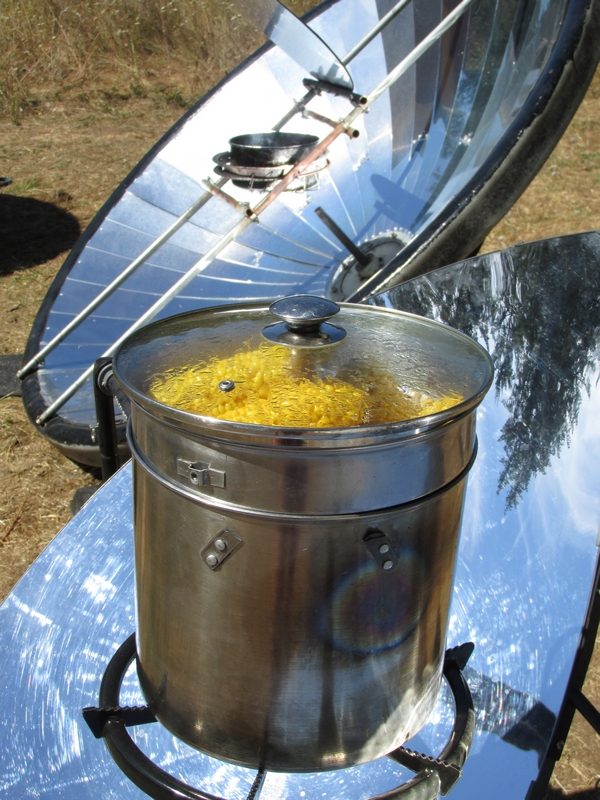

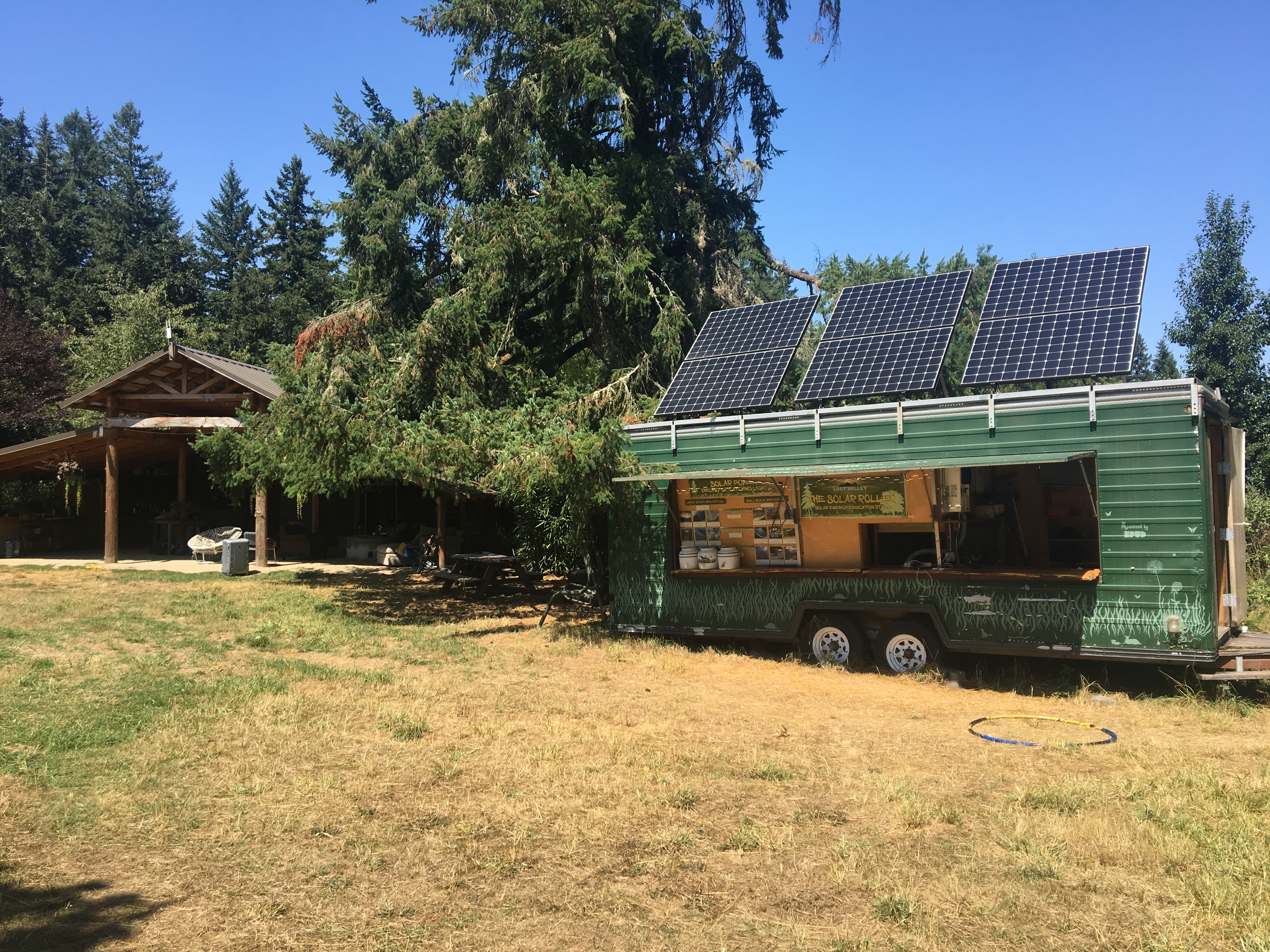

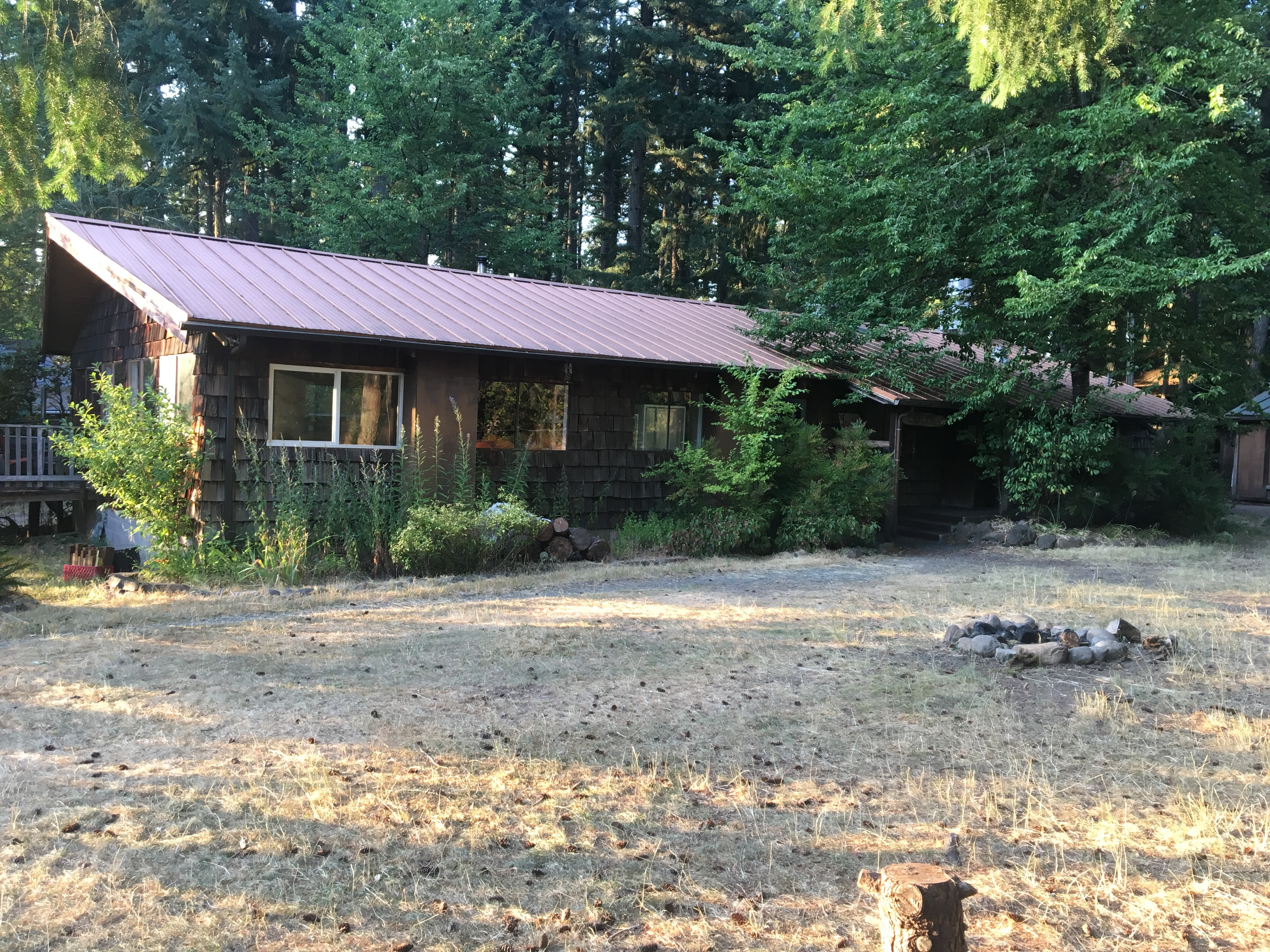
