= Bulbophyllum leibergii =

Scientific classification
- Kingdom: Plantae
- Clade: Tracheophytes
- Clade: Angiosperms
- Clade: Monocots
- Order: Asparagales
- Family: Orchidaceae
- Subfamily: Epidendroideae
- Genus: Bulbophyllum
- Species: B. leibergii

Binomial name
- Bulbophyllum leibergii Ames & Rolfe

Species of orchid

Bulbophyllum leibergii is a species of orchid in the genus Bulbophyllum. The species epitaph is in honor of John Bernhard Leiberg.
