= Latham, Oregon =

Unincorporated community in the state of Oregon, United States

- Unincorporated community
- Location within Oregon Location within the United States
- Coordinates: 43°46′31″N 123°03′44″W
- Country: United States
- State: Oregon
- County: Lane
- Elevation: 705 ft (215 m)
- Time zone: UTC-8 (Pacific (PST))
  - Summer (DST): UTC-7 (PDT)
- ZIP code: 97424
- Area codes: 458 and 541
- GNIS feature ID: 1136462

Latham is an unincorporated community in Lane County, Oregon, United States. It is located on Interstate 5 about 2 miles south of downtown Cottage Grove. The community was named after the politician Milton S. Latham. The post office operated for about ten years, from September 16, 1878 to February 14, 1888. James J. Comstock was its first postmaster. Latham is now served by the Cottage Grove post office.
