= Linslaw, Oregon =

Unincorporated community in the state of Oregon, United States

- Unincorporated community
- Location within Oregon Location within the United States
- Coordinates: 44°00′01″N 123°41′02″W
- Country: United States
- State: Oregon
- County: Lane
- Elevation: 295 ft (90 m)
- Time zone: UTC-8 (Pacific (PST))
  - Summer (DST): UTC-7 (PDT)
- ZIP code: 97490
- Area codes: 458 and 541
- GNIS feature ID: 1145054

Linslaw is an unincorporated community in Lane County, Oregon, United States. It is located about eight miles west of Walton on Oregon Route 126 next to the Siuslaw River.

In 1917, when a petition was sent to the United States Post Office Department for a post office at this locale, it was approved with the name "Linslaw". Locals could not explain the source of the name, but the author of Oregon Geographic Names has a theory that the name was supposed to be "Siuslaw", and the handwriting on the petition was unclear and misread as "Linslaw". Linslaw post office was closed in 1957. The Coos Bay Line of the Southern Pacific Railroad had a station here. Today this line is owned by the Central Oregon and Pacific Railroad.
