= Indiola, Oregon =

Unincorporated community in the state of Oregon, United States

- Unincorporated community
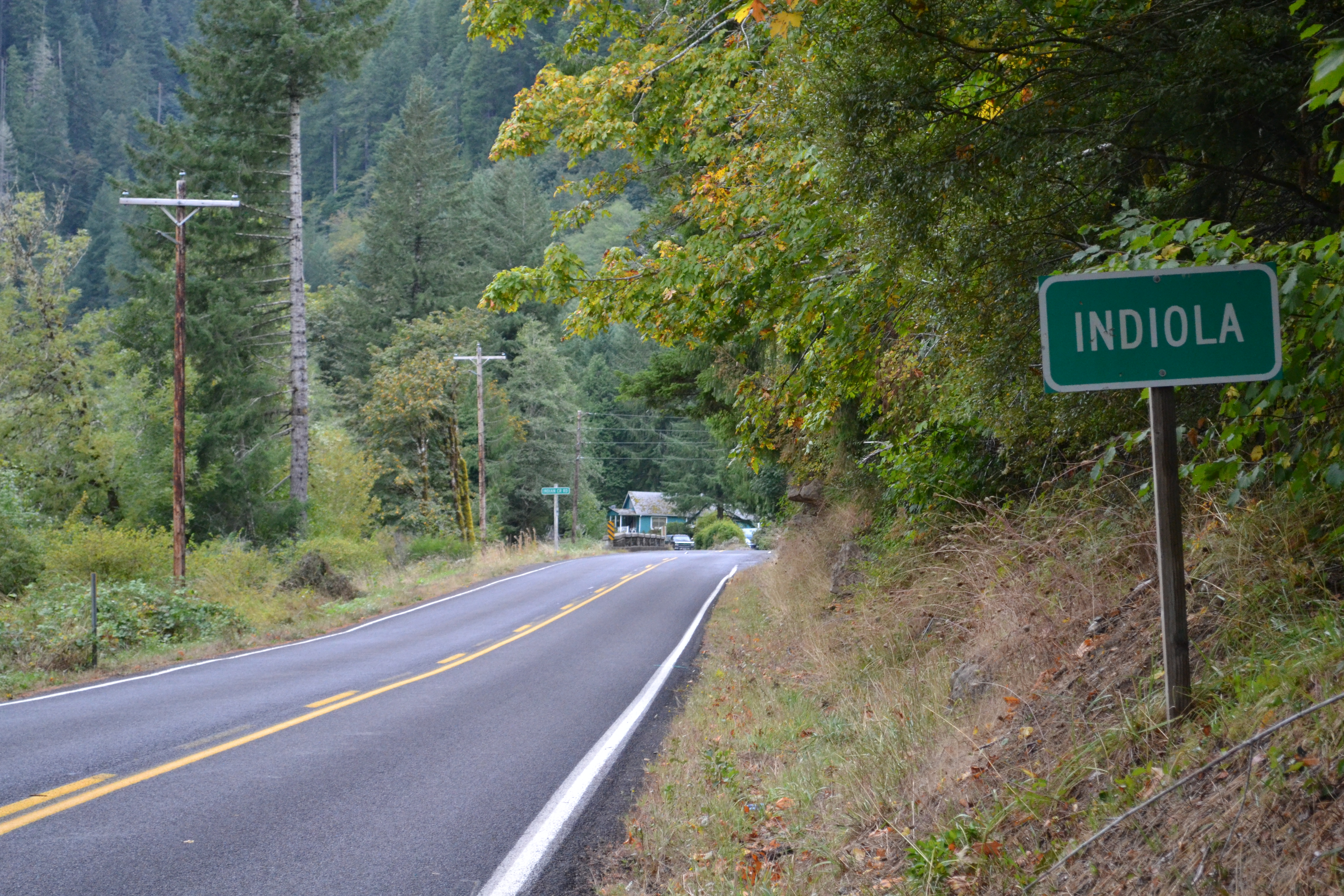

- Location within Oregon Location within the United States
- Coordinates: 44°04′50″N 123°47′28″W
- Country: United States
- State: Oregon
- County: Lane
- Elevation: 200 ft (61 m)
- Time zone: UTC-8 (Pacific (PST))
  - Summer (DST): UTC-7 (PDT)
- ZIP code: 97453
- GNIS feature ID: 1989138

Indiola is an unincorporated community in Lane County, Oregon, United States. It is located on Oregon Route 36 about 10 miles (16 km) east of its junction with Oregon Route 126 in Mapleton, near the Siuslaw River.
