= Walker, Oregon =

Unincorporated community in the state of Oregon, United States

Coordinates: 43°51′14″N 123°02′23″W

Walker is an unincorporated community in Lane County, Oregon, United States, about 4 miles (6 km) north of Cottage Grove on Oregon Route 99, near the Coast Fork Willamette River.

A station with the name "Walkers" was established on the Siskiyou Line of the Southern Pacific Railroad in 1881. Walker post office was established in 1891 by Francis Smith, who bought some property from area pioneer J. F. Walker and named the office for her, though the locale was being called Walker at least ten years earlier. The name of the station was named to match the post office in 1898. The office was discontinued in 1925.

As of 1990, the former Walker schoolhouse was being used as a shed and shop. Walker Union Church was built in 1895.

== Climate ==
This region experiences warm (but not hot) and dry summers, with no average monthly temperatures above 71.6 °F (22.0 °C). According to the Köppen Climate Classification system, Walker has a warm-summer Mediterranean climate, abbreviated "Csb" on climate maps.
