= Dexter, Oregon =

Unincorporated community in Oregon, U.S.

- Census-designated place
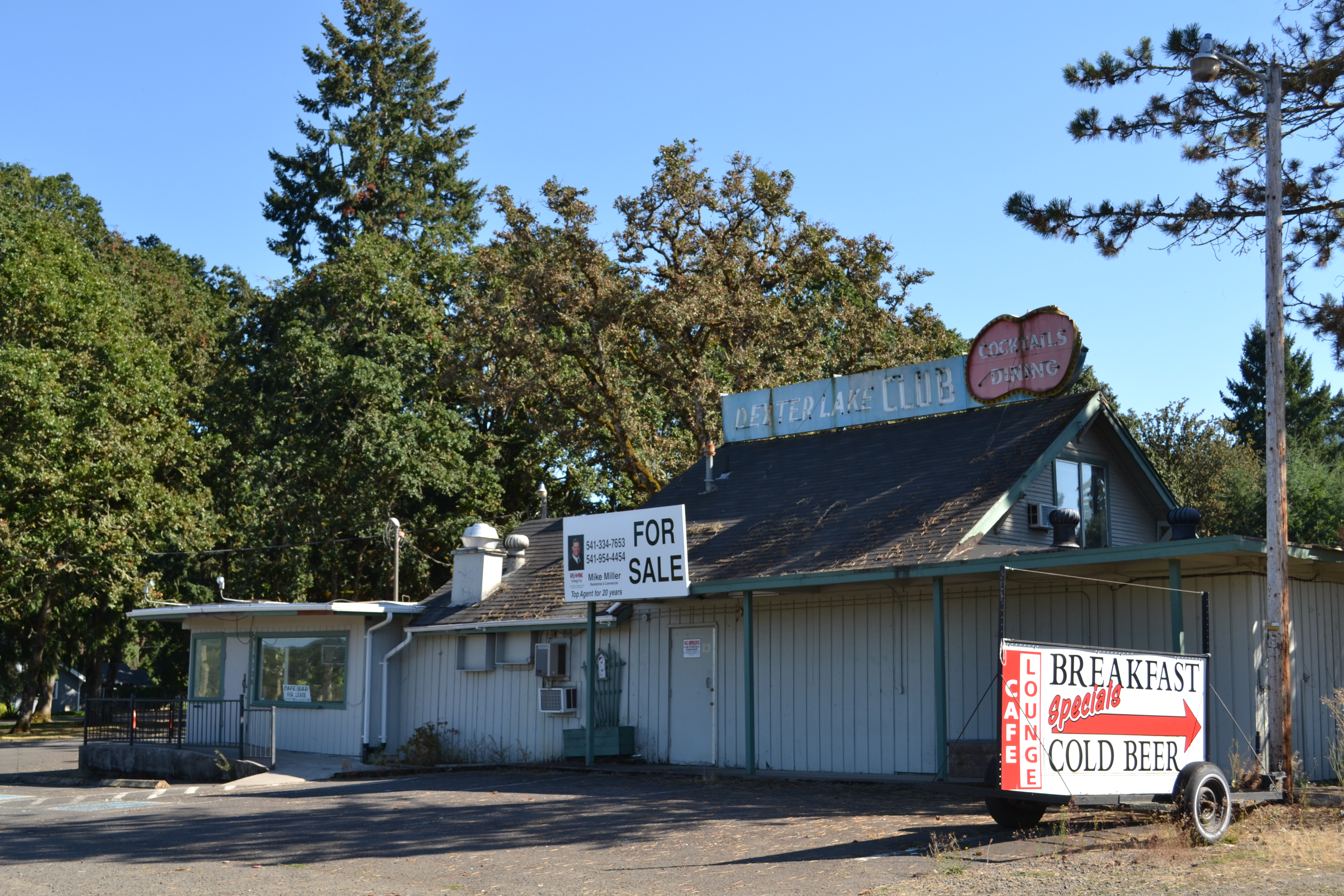
- The Dexter Lake Club

- Location within Oregon Location within the United States
- Coordinates: 43°55′07″N 122°49′19″W
- Country: United States
- State: Oregon
- County: Lane

Area
  - Total: 1.92 sq mi (4.98 km^{2})
  - Land: 1.84 sq mi (4.76 km^{2})
  - Water: 0.081 sq mi (0.21 km^{2})
- Elevation: 663 ft (202 m)

Population (2020)
  - Total: 893
  - Density: 485.4/sq mi (187.42/km^{2})
- Time zone: UTC-8 (Pacific (PST))
  - Summer (DST): UTC-7 (PDT)
- ZIP code: 97431
- Area codes: 458 and 541
- FIPS code: 41-19250
- GNIS feature ID: 2812884

Dexter is an unincorporated community and census-designated place (CDP) in the Lane County of the U.S. State of Oregon. It is located near Dexter Lake, a reservoir of the Middle Fork Willamette River along Oregon Route 58.

As of the 2020 census, Dexter had a population of 893.

Access to Dexter Lake, a popular fishing and boating site, is available at Dexter State Recreation Site. The nearby Dexter Lake Club was used in the filming of the road trip scene in the 1978 movie Animal House.

The Lost Valley Educational Center is an intentional community near Dexter.

The Parvin Bridge, a covered bridge near Dexter, was placed on the National Register of Historic Places in 1979. It carries Parvin Road over Lost Creek, which flows by Dexter.

In 2002, despite not having a city government, Dexter residents opened a public library, the Cascades Foothills Library, that as of August 2006 they are hoping to expand into a regional library.

== History ==
A post office was established in the locality in 1872 and named "Butte Disappointment", after a local landmark named in 1848. The post office was renamed "Dexter" in 1875, apparently after the "Dexter" brand cook stove owned by the postmaster's family.

== Demographics ==
Historical population
| Census | Pop. | Note | %± |
|---|---|---|---|
| 2020 | 893 | | — |
U.S. Decennial Census
