= Leaburg, Oregon =

Unincorporated community in the state of Oregon, United States

- Unincorporated community
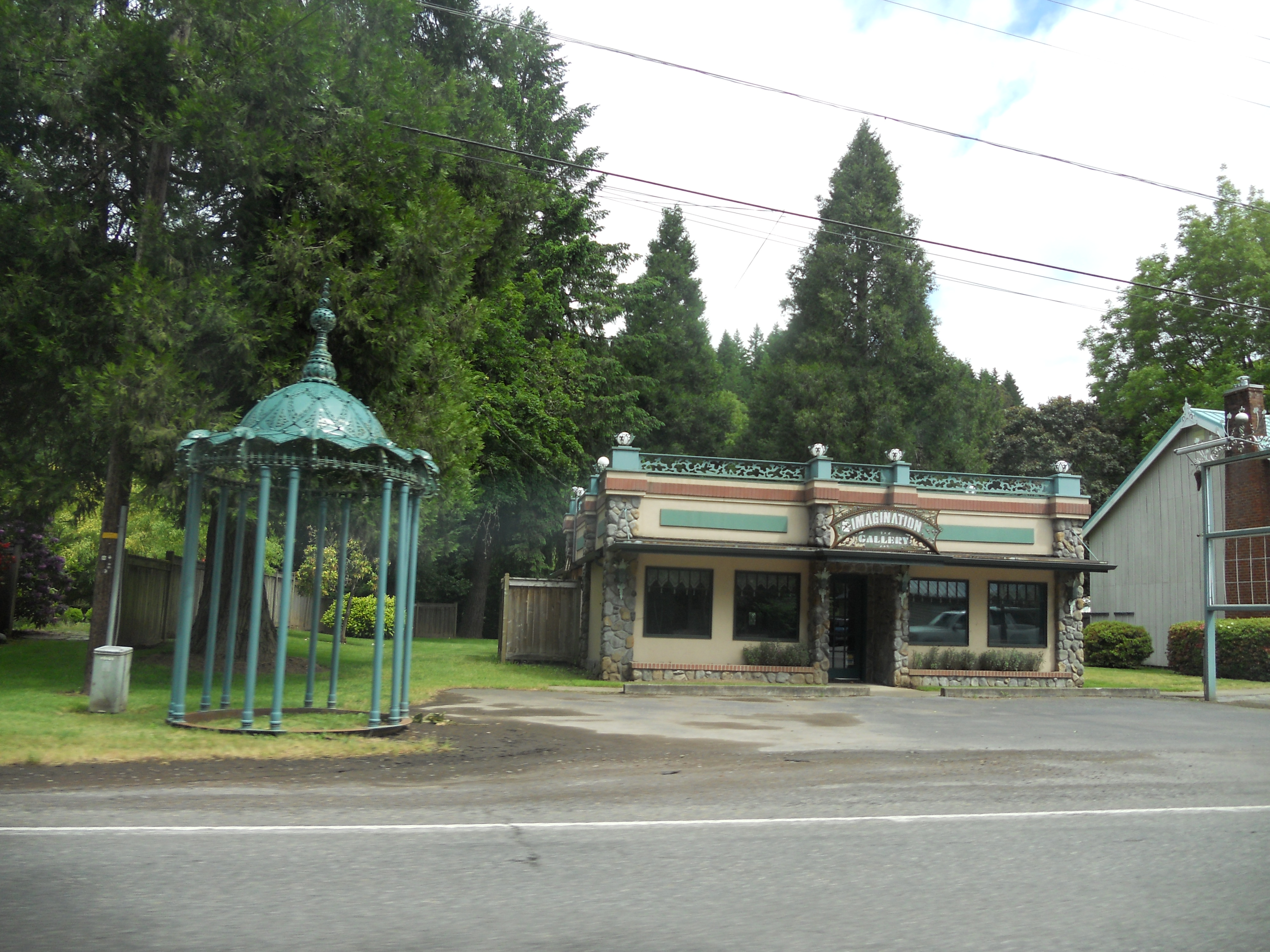
- The Imagination Gallery in Leaburg

- Location within Oregon Location within the United States
- Coordinates: 44°06′26″N 122°40′37″W
- Country: United States
- State: Oregon
- County: Lane
- Elevation: 682 ft (208 m)
- Time zone: UTC-8 (Pacific (PST))
  - Summer (DST): UTC-7 (PDT)
- ZIP code: 97489
- Area codes: 458 and 541
- GNIS feature ID: 1123011

Leaburg is an unincorporated community in Lane County, Oregon, United States located on the McKenzie River and Oregon Route 126 east of Walterville and west of Vida.

== History ==
The first post office in this locale was established in 1877 and named "Leaburgh", for first postmaster Leander Cruzan. At some point the spelling was changed to "Leaburg". On May 25, 1907, the office was moved two miles (3 km) west and the name was changed to "Deerhorn"; Deerhorn post office closed in 1913. A new Leaburg office was established on September 20, 1907.

== Hydropower project and hatchery ==
The city of Eugene's water utility, Eugene Water & Electric Board (EWEB), runs Leaburg Power Plant on the McKenzie River about one mile (1.6 km) east of Leaburg. This is one of three EWEB hydropower projects on the river. Leaburg Dam, built in 1928 about three miles (5 km) east of the community, impounds and diverts the McKenzie into the Leaburg Canal; the impoundment forms the 40-acre (160,000 m^{2}) Leaburg Reservoir. The canal holds the water at a higher elevation than the natural level of the river for about five miles (8 km)—this allows the water to turn the power plant's turbines and generators. Leaburg Power Plant was designed in 1929 by noted Oregon architect Ellis F. Lawrence in the Art Deco style and includes motifs from Greek mythology sculpted by Harry Poole Camden. EWEB's Lloyd Knox Water Board Park is on the south shore of the reservoir, while the Oregon Department of Fish and Wildlife (ODFW) runs the Leaburg Hatchery, a rainbow trout and steelhead fish hatchery, nearby.

== Other hatcheries ==
The ODFW also runs the McKenzie Salmon Hatchery about two miles (3 km) east of Leaburg on the north bank of the river. This hatchery was built in 1938 and rebuilt in 1975.

On the north bank of the river, about four miles (6 km) east of Leaburg, is the Old McKenzie Fish Hatchery, which was listed on the National Register of Historic Places in 1996. The hatchery raised trout and salmon from 1907 until the 1950s. Many original structures are on the property, including the main house, which was built in the early 1900s for the hatchery superintendent. The site is under the jurisdiction of the Lane County Parks Department, and the McKenzie River Chamber of Commerce and Tourist Information Center is located there.

== Climate ==
Leaburg has a warm-summer Mediterranean climate (Csb) according to the Köppen climate classification system.

Climate data for Leaburg (1991–2020 normals, extremes 1933–present)
Month	Jan	Feb	Mar	Apr	May	Jun	Jul	Aug	Sep	Oct	Nov	Dec	Year
Record high °F (°C)	70 (21)	78 (26)	80 (27)	90 (32)	95 (35)	113 (45)	107 (42)	108 (42)	102 (39)	97 (36)	77 (25)	67 (19)	113 (45)
Mean daily maximum °F (°C)	48.7 (9.3)	52.6 (11.4)	56.7 (13.7)	61.4 (16.3)	68.2 (20.1)	74.0 (23.3)	83.5 (28.6)	84.1 (28.9)	77.7 (25.4)	65.1 (18.4)	53.8 (12.1)	46.9 (8.3)	64.4 (18.0)
Daily mean °F (°C)	41.9 (5.5)	44.2 (6.8)	46.9 (8.3)	50.7 (10.4)	56.5 (13.6)	61.4 (16.3)	67.7 (19.8)	67.7 (19.8)	62.9 (17.2)	54.3 (12.4)	46.2 (7.9)	40.8 (4.9)	53.4 (11.9)
Mean daily minimum °F (°C)	35.2 (1.8)	35.7 (2.1)	37.2 (2.9)	40.0 (4.4)	44.8 (7.1)	48.7 (9.3)	51.9 (11.1)	51.4 (10.8)	48.1 (8.9)	43.4 (6.3)	38.6 (3.7)	34.8 (1.6)	42.5 (5.8)
Record low °F (°C)	6 (−14)	4 (−16)	20 (−7)	27 (−3)	28 (−2)	35 (2)	40 (4)	38 (3)	31 (−1)	25 (−4)	15 (−9)	2 (−17)	2 (−17)
Average precipitation inches (mm)	9.01 (229)	6.96 (177)	7.55 (192)	6.65 (169)	4.28 (109)	2.84 (72)	0.52 (13)	0.62 (16)	2.13 (54)	5.68 (144)	9.70 (246)	10.69 (272)	66.63 (1,692)
Average snowfall inches (cm)	0.5 (1.3)	1.2 (3.0)	0.2 (0.51)	0.0 (0.0)	0.0 (0.0)	0.0 (0.0)	0.0 (0.0)	0.0 (0.0)	0.0 (0.0)	0.0 (0.0)	0.2 (0.51)	1.3 (3.3)	3.4 (8.6)
Average precipitation days (≥ 0.01 in)	19.9	17.7	19.8	18.6	13.6	9.4	2.8	3.2	6.6	14.0	19.8	20.6	166.0
Average snowy days (≥ 0.1 in)	0.5	0.6	0.6	0.0	0.0	0.0	0.0	0.0	0.0	0.0	0.1	0.6	2.4
Source: NOAA
