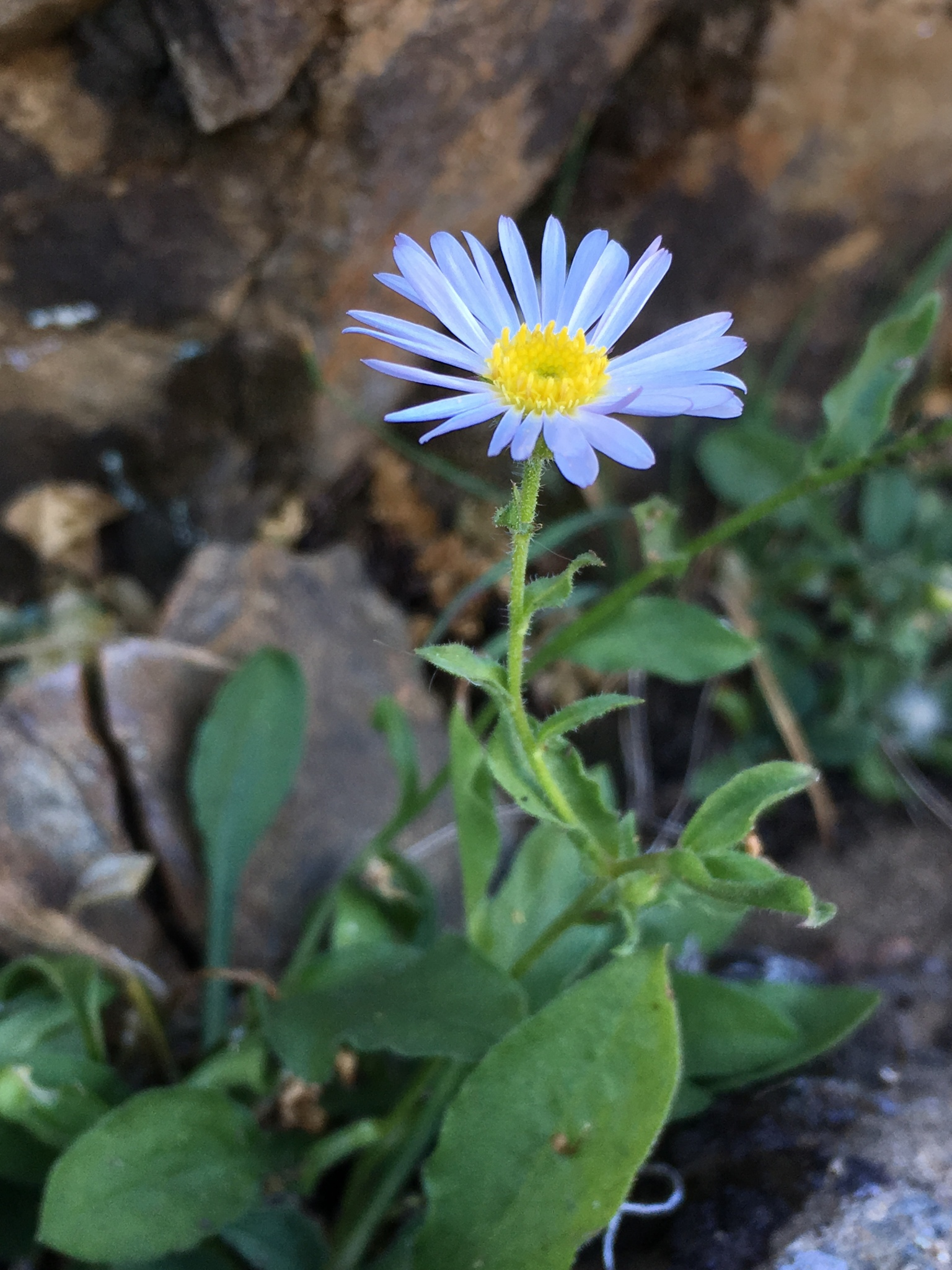

Scientific classification
- Kingdom: Plantae
- Clade: Tracheophytes
- Clade: Angiosperms
- Clade: Eudicots
- Clade: Asterids
- Order: Asterales
- Family: Asteraceae
- Genus: Erigeron
- Species: E. leibergii

Binomial name
- Erigeron leibergii Piper

Synonyms
- Erigeron chelanensis H.St.John

= Erigeron leibergii =

Species of flowering plant

Erigeron leibergii is a rare species of flowering plant in the family Asteraceae known by the common name Leiberg's fleabane. It is native to the Cascades Mountains in southern British Columbia in Canada and north-central Washington in the United States.

Erigeron leibergii is a branching perennial herb up to 25 centimeters (10 inches) tall, producing a woody taproot. The leaves and the stem are covered with small glandular hairs. The plant can produce 1-5 flower heads per stem, each head with up to 25 purple, lavender, white, or pink ray florets surrounding numerous yellow disc florets in the center.

The species is named for plant collector John Bernhard Leiberg.
