= Trifolium leibergii =

Conservation status
- Imperiled (NatureServe)

Scientific classification
- Kingdom: Plantae
- Clade: Embryophytes
- Clade: Tracheophytes
- Clade: Angiosperms
- Clade: Eudicots
- Clade: Rosids
- Order: Fabales
- Family: Fabaceae
- Subfamily: Faboideae
- Genus: Trifolium
- Species: T. leibergii

Binomial name
- Trifolium leibergii A.Nelson & J.F.Macbr.

Species of legume

Trifolium leibergii is a species of flowering plant in the legume family known by the common name Leiberg's clover.

== Description ==
This clover is a perennial herb growing 10 to 15 centimeters (4 to 6 in) tall. The plant has a coating of gray hairs. The leaves are each made up of three spine-tipped leaflets. The inflorescence is a head of several flowers which are cream-colored with tinges of pink or purple. Blooming occurs in June and July.

== Distribution and habitat ==
This plant is native to Oregon and Nevada in the United States. The plant may have a disjunct distribution, but it is possible more populations occur in the 300 kilometers (190 mi) between the two population centers in southern Oregon and northern Nevada.

It grows in soils of decomposing tuff, a volcanic ash substrate. The plants grow in cracks in the soil, so that they can appear to be growing in a straight line. There is little other vegetation in the habitat, but associated plants may include Artemisia arbuscula.
