= Walton, Oregon =

Unincorporated community in the state of Oregon, United States

- Unincorporated community
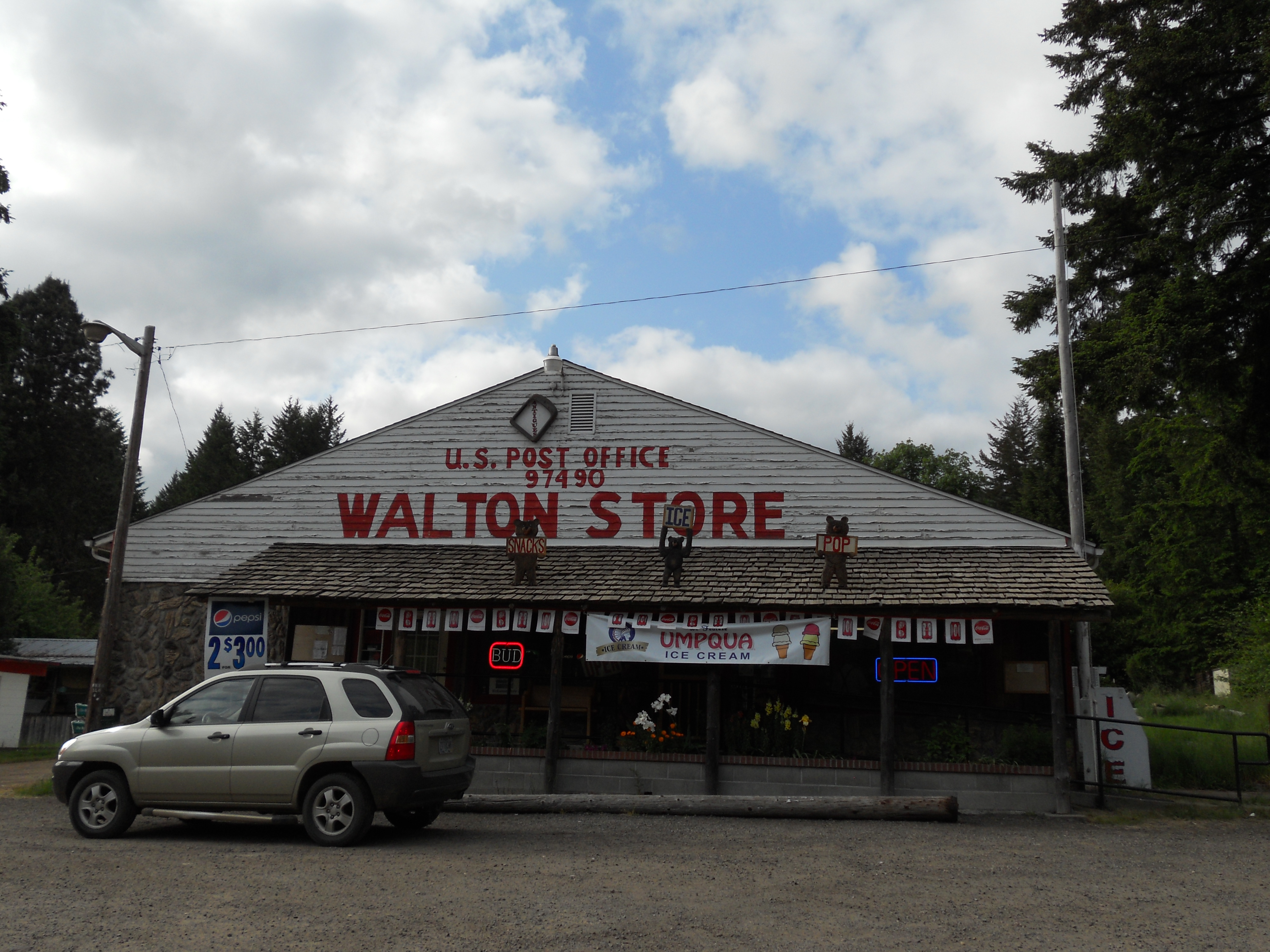
- The post office and store at Walton

- Location within Oregon Location within the United States
- Coordinates: 44°01′50″N 123°35′07″W
- Country: United States
- State: Oregon
- County: Lane
- Elevation: 456 ft (139 m)
- Time zone: UTC-8 (Pacific (PST))
  - Summer (DST): UTC-7 (PDT)
- ZIP code: 97490
- Area codes: 458 and 541
- GNIS feature ID: 1136877

Walton is an unincorporated community in Lane County, Oregon, United States. It is located halfway between Eugene and Florence on Oregon Route 126.

Construction of Route 126 began in 1881, and after it crossed the Oregon Coast Range near Noti, it followed a tributary of the Siuslaw River named Walton Creek. Walton post office was established in 1884 to serve the settlers along the new route and postmaster James L. Atkinson named it for the stream. The stream was in turn named for Joshua J. Walton, a pioneer lawyer who served as a county judge and regent for the University of Oregon. After the turn of the 19th century, the stream's name was changed to Wildcat Creek.
