= Lane County, Oregon =

County in Oregon, United States

- County
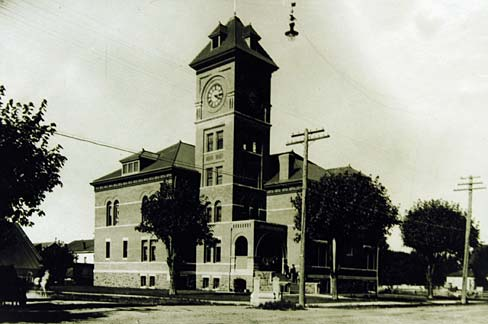
- Lane County Courthouse in Eugene, built in 1898 and demolished in 1959

- Location within the U.S. state of Oregon
- Coordinates: 43°57′N 122°53′W
- Country: United States
- State: Oregon
- Founded: January 29, 1851
- Named for: Joseph Lane
- Seat: Eugene
- Largest city: Eugene

Area
  - Total: 4,722 sq mi (12,230 km^{2})
  - Land: 4,553 sq mi (11,790 km^{2})
  - Water: 169 sq mi (440 km^{2}) 3.6%

Population (2020)
  - Total: 382,971
  - Estimate (2025): 381,584 ▼
  - Density: 84.11/sq mi (32.48/km^{2})
- Time zone: UTC−8 (Pacific)
  - Summer (DST): UTC−7 (PDT)
- Congressional district: 4th
- Website: www.lanecounty.org

Lane County is one of the 36 counties in the U.S. state of Oregon. As of the 2020 census, the population was 382,971, making it the fourth-most populous county in Oregon. The county seat is Eugene, the state's second most populous city. It is named in honor of Joseph Lane, Oregon's first territorial governor. Lane County comprises the Eugene, OR Metropolitan Statistical Area. It is the third-largest MSA in Oregon, and the 144th-largest in the country.

== History ==
Lane County was established on January 29, 1851. It was created from the southern part of Linn County and the portion of Benton County east of Umpqua County. It was named after the territory's first governor, Joseph Lane. Originally it covered all of southern Oregon east to the Cascade Mountains and south to the California border. When the Territorial Legislature created Lane County, it did not designate a county seat. In the 1853 election, four sites competed for the designation, of which the "Mulligan donation" received a majority vote; however, since it was contiguous to the "Skinner claim" both became part of the new county seat known as Eugene.

In 1846, Elijah Bristow and his wife, the former Susannah Gabbart, had become the first white settlers to build a claim cabin within the present-day boundaries of Lane County, near Pleasant Hill. They had crossed the plains to California in the previous year, and came north with Eugene F. Skinner, Captain Felix Scott, and William Dodson. As their party entered the valley between the Coast Fork and Middle Fork of the Willamette River, Bristow gazed around and exclaimed, "What a pleasant hill! Here is my home!"

In 1852, John Diamond and William Macy led an exploration party to survey a shortcut for the Oregon Trail across the Cascade Range. The shortcut over the Willamette Pass became known as the Free Emigrant Road. Around 250 wagons with 1,027 people left the usual Oregon Trail route at Vale, Oregon, and followed Elijah Elliott through the central Oregon high desert. This became known as the Elliott Cutoff. When they reached what is now Bend, they sent scouts to the south to look for the road. Once settlers in the Willamette Valley discovered the emigrants were coming, a huge rescue effort was launched as the emigrants were out of supplies and in dire condition. The emigrants of this wagon train doubled the population of Lane County in 1853.

The county has been vastly reduced from its original size by several boundary changes. One of the first changes gave it access to the Pacific Ocean, when it acquired the northern part of Umpqua County in 1853. With the creation of Wasco County in 1854, it lost all of its territory east of the Cascade Mountains. Minor boundary changes occurred with Douglas County in 1852, 1885, 1903, 1915, and 1917; with Linn County in 1907 and with Benton County in 1923.

== Geography ==
Map of Lane County

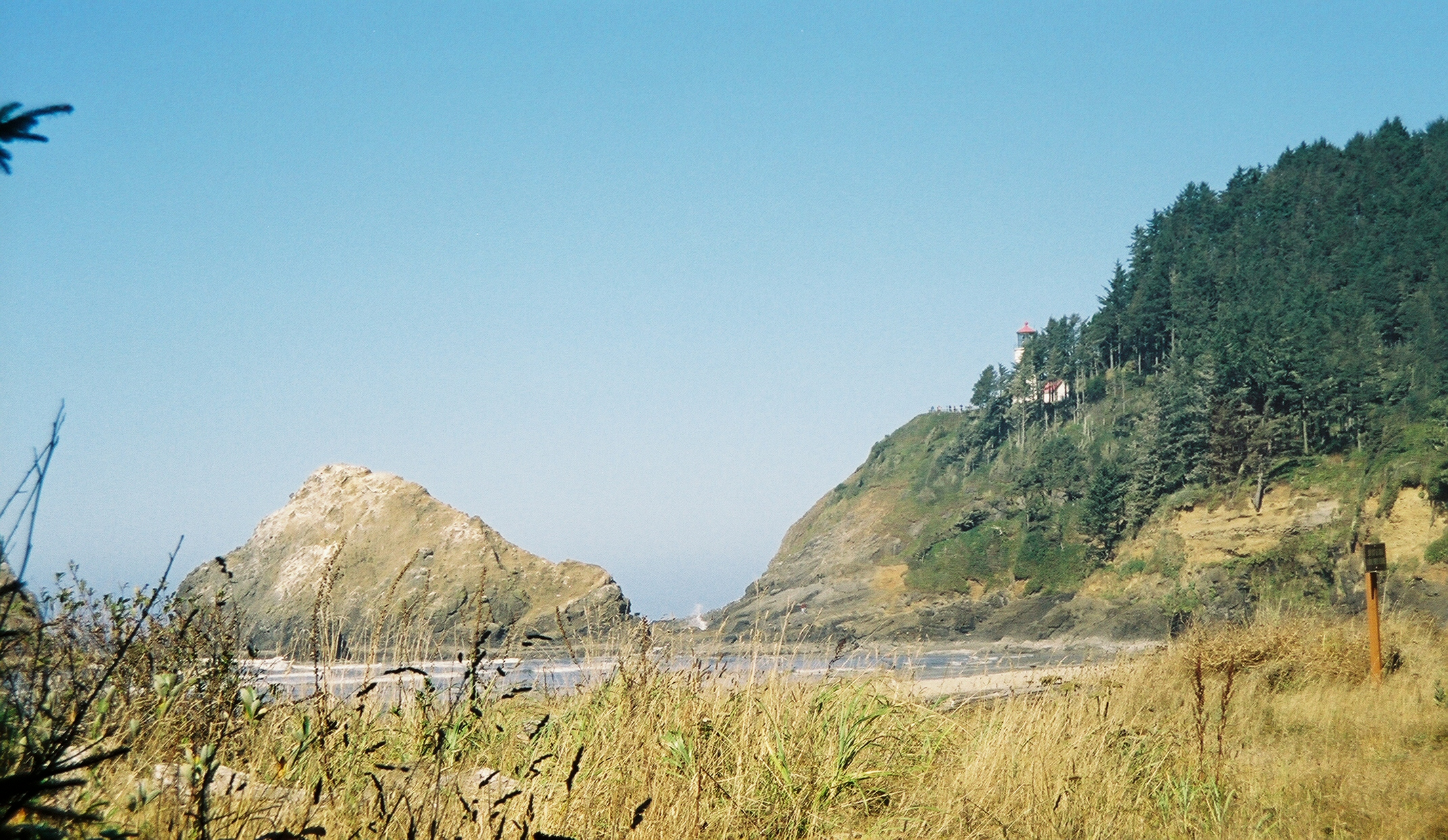
Heceta Head on the coastline of Lane County

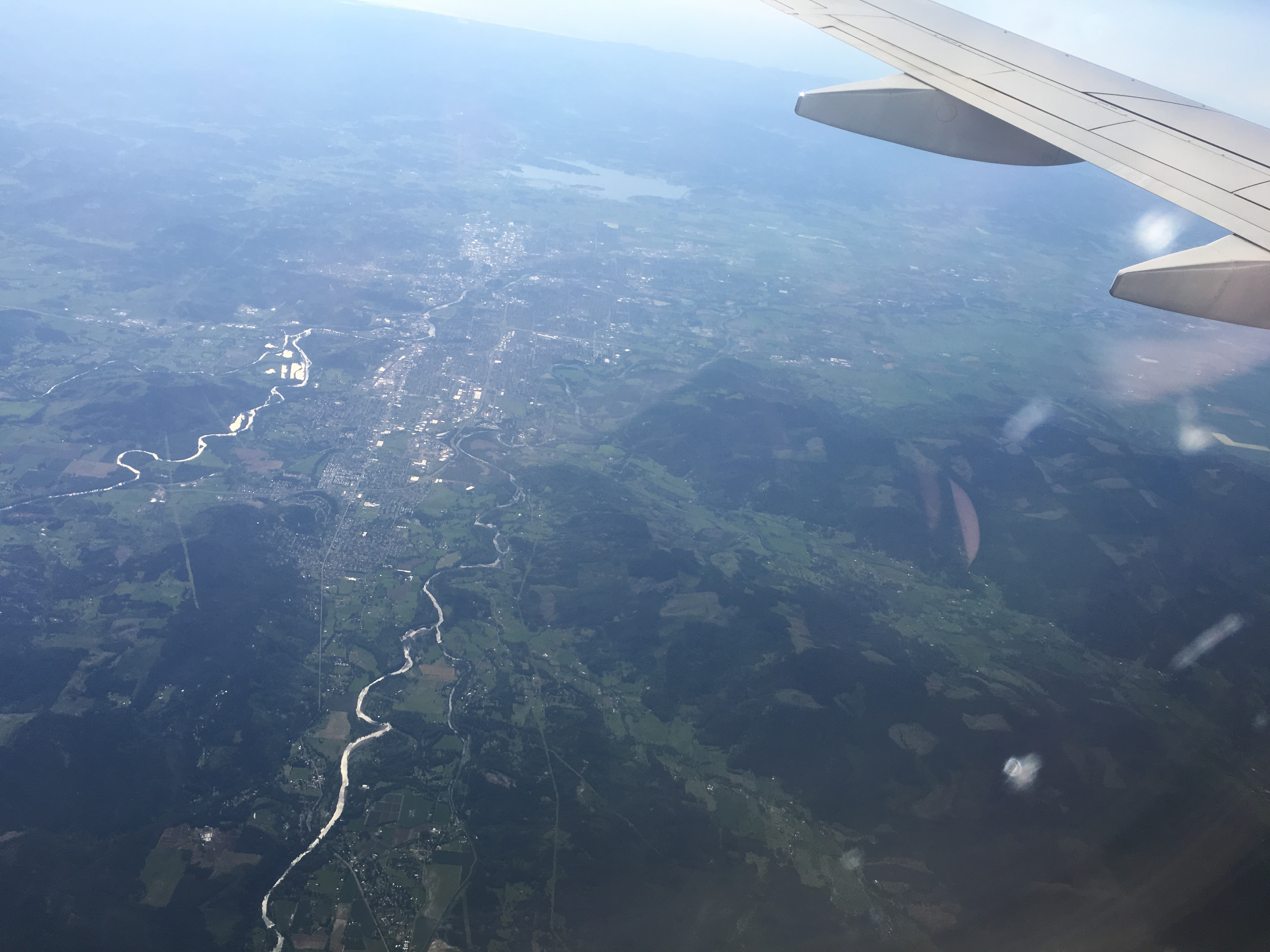
Aerial view of the Eugene-Springfield metropolitan area

According to the United States Census Bureau, the county has a total area of 4,722 square miles (12,230 km^{2}), of which 4,553 square miles (11,790 km^{2}) is land and 169 square miles (440 km^{2}) (3.6%) is water. Lane County is one of two Oregon counties that extend from the Pacific Ocean to the Cascades (the other is Douglas County.) A portion of the Umpqua National Forest is in Lane County. Portions of the Willamette, McKenzie, and Siuslaw rivers run through the county.

=== Adjacent counties ===
- Lincoln County (northwest)
- Benton County (north)
- Linn County (northeast)
- Deschutes County (east)
- Klamath County (southeast)
- Douglas County (south)

=== National protected areas ===
- Oregon Islands National Wildlife Refuge (part)
- Siuslaw National Forest (part)
- Umpqua National Forest (part)
- Willamette National Forest (part)

== Demographics ==
Historical population
Census	Pop.	Note	%±
1860	4,780		—
1870	6,426		34.4%
1880	9,411		46.5%
1890	15,198		61.5%
1900	19,604		29.0%
1910	33,783		72.3%
1920	36,166		7.1%
1930	54,493		50.7%
1940	69,096		26.8%
1950	125,776		82.0%
1960	162,890		29.5%
1970	213,358		31.0%
1980	275,226		29.0%
1990	282,912		2.8%
2000	322,959		14.2%
2010	351,715		8.9%
2020	382,971		8.9%
2025 (est.)	381,584	▼	−0.4%
U.S. Decennial Census; 1790–1960 1900–1990; 1990–2000 2010–2020

=== 2020 census ===
Lane County, Oregon – Racial and ethnic composition Note: the US Census treats Hispanic/Latino as an ethnic category. This table excludes Latinos from the racial categories and assigns them to a separate category. Hispanics/Latinos may be of any race.
Race / Ethnicity (NH = Non-Hispanic)	Pop 1980	Pop 1990	Pop 2000	Pop 2010	Pop 2020	% 1980	% 1990	% 2000	% 2010	% 2020
White alone (NH)	261,505	265,391	286,075	297,808	298,507	95.01%	93.81%	88.58%	84.67%	77.95%
Black or African American alone (NH)	1,566	2,040	2,391	3,102	4,352	0.57%	0.72%	0.74%	0.88%	1.14%
Native American or Alaska Native alone (NH)	2,471	3,017	3,268	3,418	3,355	0.90%	1.07%	1.01%	0.97%	0.88%
Asian alone (NH)	2,919	5,419	6,390	8,169	9,404	1.06%	1.92%	1.98%	2.32%	2.46%
Native Hawaiian or Pacific Islander alone (NH)	x	x	562	732	947	x	x	0.17%	0.21%	0.25%
Other race alone (NH)	1,184	193	534	514	2,377	0.43%	0.07%	0.17%	0.15%	0.62%
Mixed race or Multiracial (NH)	x	x	8,865	11,805	26,249	x	x	2.74%	3.36%	6.85%
Hispanic or Latino (any race)	5,581	6,852	14,874	26,167	37,780	2.03%	2.42%	4.61%	7.44%	9.86%
Total	275,226	282,912	322,959	351,715	382,971	100.00%	100.00%	100.00%	100.00%	100.00%

=== American Community Survey 2025 data ===
The United States Census Bureau estimated that in 2025, Lane County’s population was 382.971. It was also estimated that the county's population was 77,00% Non-Hispanic White, 11,30% Hispanic or Latino, 1,60% Non-Hispanic Black, 2,70% Asian, 1,10% Native American, 0,80% Pacific Islander, and 5,50% Multiracial.

Total	Population	Percentage
Non-Hispanic White	294.888	77,00%
Hispanic or Latino	43.276	11,30%
Non-Hispanic Black	6.128	1,60%
Asian	10.340	2,70%
Native American	4.213	1,10%
Pacific Islander	3.064	0,80%
Non-Hispanic Multiracial	21.063	5,50%

As of the 2020 census, the county had a population of 382,971. Of the residents, 18.1% were under the age of 18 and 20.9% were 65 years of age or older; the median age was 40.6 years. For every 100 females there were 97.1 males, and for every 100 females age 18 and over there were 95.2 males. 82.0% of residents lived in urban areas and 18.0% lived in rural areas.

As of the 2020 census, the racial makeup of the county was 80.7% White, 1.2% Black or African American, 1.2% American Indian and Alaska Native, 2.5% Asian, 0.3% Native Hawaiian and Pacific Islander, 3.9% from some other race, and 10.1% from two or more races. Hispanic or Latino residents of any race comprised 9.9% of the population.

As of the 2020 census, the non-Hispanic white population accounted for 77.95% of residents, non-Hispanic African Americans 1.14%, non-Hispanic Native Americans 0.88%, non-Hispanic Asians 2.46%, and non-Hispanic individuals reporting two or more races 6.85%.

As of the 2020 census, there were 156,594 households in the county, of which 24.3% had children under the age of 18 living with them and 28.0% had a female householder with no spouse or partner present; 29.4% of all households were made up of individuals and 13.4% had someone living alone who was 65 years of age or older.

As of the 2020 census, there were 166,226 housing units, of which 5.8% were vacant. Among occupied housing units, 59.2% were owner-occupied and 40.8% were renter-occupied; the homeowner vacancy rate was 1.0% and the rental vacancy rate was 4.4%.

=== 2010 census ===
As of the 2010 census, there were 351,715 people, 145,966 households, and 86,938 families living in the county. The population density was 77.2 inhabitants per square mile (29.8/km^{2}). There were 156,112 housing units at an average density of 34.3 units per square mile (13.2 units/km^{2}). The racial makeup of the county was 88.3% white, 2.4% Asian, 1.2% American Indian, 1.0% black or African American, 0.2% Pacific islander, 2.8% from other races, and 4.2% from two or more races. Those of Hispanic or Latino origin made up 7.4% of the population. In terms of ancestry, 21.8% were German, 14.9% were English, 13.8% were Irish, and 5.3% were American.

Of the 145,966 households, 26.3% had children under the age of 18 living with them, 44.3% were married couples living together, 10.6% had a female householder with no husband present, 40.4% were non-families, and 28.9% of all households were made up of individuals. The average household size was 2.35 and the average family size was 2.87. The median age was 39.0 years.

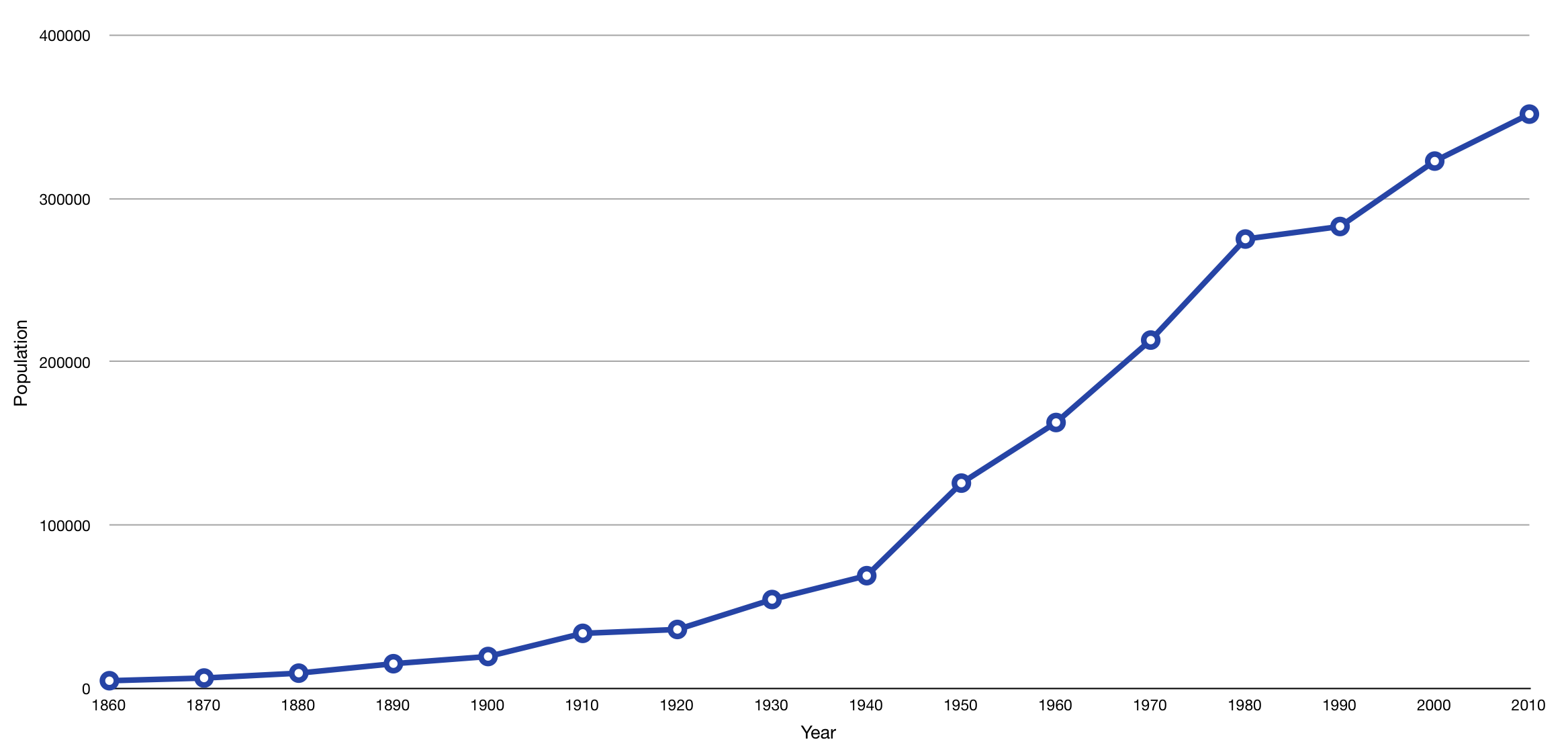
Graph of the change in county population from 1860 to 2010

The median income for a household in the county was $42,923 and the median income for a family was $55,817. Males had a median income of $43,383 versus $32,745 for females. The per capita income for the county was $23,869. About 10.0% of families and 16.7% of the population were below the poverty line, including 17.1% of those under age 18 and 8.7% of those age 65 or over.

Lane County is the fourth-most populous county in Oregon. It grew more slowly from 2000 to 2010 than did the three larger counties, Multnomah (the most populous Oregon county), Washington and Clackamas.

=== 2000 census ===
As of the census of 2000, there were 322,959 people, 130,453 households, and 82,185 families living in the county. The population density was 71 people per square mile (27 people/km^{2}). There were 138,946 housing units at an average density of 30 units per square mile (12/km^{2}). The racial makeup of the county was 90.64% White, 0.78% Black or African American, 1.13% Native American, 2.00% Asian, 0.19% Pacific Islander, 1.95% from other races, and 3.32% from two or more races. 4.61% of the population were Hispanic or Latino of any race.

There were 130,453 households, out of which 28.50% had children under the age of 18 living with them, 48.90% were married couples living together, 10.00% had a female householder with no husband present, and 37.00% were non-families. 26.60% of all households were made up of individuals, and 9.10% had someone living alone who was 65 years of age or older. The average household size was 2.42 and the average family size was 2.92.

In the county, the population was spread out, with 22.90% under the age of 18, 12.00% from 18 to 24, 27.50% from 25 to 44, 24.40% from 45 to 64, and 13.30% who were 65 years of age or older. The median age was 37 years. For every 100 females there were 96.90 males. For every 100 females age 18 and over, there were 94.70 males.

The median income for a household in the county was $36,942, and the median income for a family was $45,111. Males had a median income of $34,358 versus $25,103 for females. The per capita income for the county was $19,681. About 9.00% of families and 14.40% of the population were below the poverty line, including 16.10% of those under age 18 and 7.50% of those age 65 or over.

== Government ==
Lane County is governed by a County commission. Commissioners are elected officials and serve four-year terms. The current commissioners are:

- David Loveall, Springfield
- Ryan Ceniga, West Lane
- Heather Buch, East Lane
- Laurie Trieger, South Eugene
- Pat Farr, North Eugene

In presidential elections from the 1950s through the 70s, Lane County mostly leaned towards Republican candidates, but returned to a solidly Democratic county in 1984, coming to often back Democratic candidates in statewide elections by broad margins. It is one of many counties dominated by college towns that swung heavily Democratic in this period.

Through much of the mid-1800s and the first half of the 20th century, the region served as a stronghold for the pro-slavery National Democratic Party. In the 1920s the county was considered the state headquarters for the Ku Klux Klan. Major Luther I. Powell, a resident of the county and Klan leader, led early efforts to establish the Klan, first in Eugene and then across Oregon.

Lane County is currently one of 11 counties in Oregon in which therapeutic psilocybin is legal.

== Politics ==
United States presidential election results for Lane County, Oregon
Year	Republican		Democratic		Third party(ies)	
Year	No.	%	No.	%	No.	%
1880	1,012	47.05%	1,092	50.77%	47	2.19%
1884	1,251	48.92%	1,232	48.18%	74	2.89%
1888	1,593	51.60%	1,368	44.31%	126	4.08%
1892	1,902	45.71%	828	19.90%	1,431	34.39%
1896	2,215	44.94%	2,594	52.63%	120	2.43%
1900	2,521	53.13%	2,037	42.93%	187	3.94%
1904	3,501	65.88%	1,166	21.94%	647	12.18%
1908	3,313	54.91%	2,174	36.04%	546	9.05%
1912	1,986	26.43%	2,596	34.55%	2,931	39.01%
1916	7,253	51.70%	5,880	41.92%	895	6.38%
1920	7,714	61.97%	3,986	32.02%	747	6.00%
1924	8,551	59.90%	3,255	22.80%	2,469	17.30%
1928	13,647	74.96%	4,213	23.14%	345	1.90%
1932	10,547	43.70%	11,073	45.88%	2,517	10.43%
1936	8,309	34.31%	13,926	57.51%	1,980	8.18%
1940	15,349	48.13%	16,286	51.07%	255	0.80%
1944	17,690	54.60%	14,375	44.37%	332	1.02%
1948	20,843	55.27%	15,606	41.39%	1,260	3.34%
1952	35,693	63.83%	19,960	35.69%	266	0.48%
1956	35,264	56.15%	27,534	43.85%	0	0.00%
1960	36,148	52.49%	32,596	47.34%	118	0.17%
1964	24,139	32.53%	49,785	67.10%	276	0.37%
1968	39,563	49.12%	34,521	42.86%	6,465	8.03%
1972	47,739	48.62%	46,177	47.03%	4,271	4.35%
1976	46,245	42.67%	56,479	52.12%	5,643	5.21%
1980	54,750	43.59%	52,240	41.59%	18,614	14.82%
1984	61,493	48.86%	63,999	50.85%	360	0.29%
1988	47,563	39.73%	69,883	58.38%	2,256	1.88%
1992	41,789	27.52%	74,083	48.78%	35,990	23.70%
1996	48,253	34.52%	69,461	49.69%	22,073	15.79%
2000	61,578	40.46%	78,583	51.64%	12,027	7.90%
2004	75,007	40.35%	107,769	57.98%	3,096	1.67%
2008	63,835	34.90%	114,037	62.35%	5,038	2.75%
2012	62,509	36.37%	102,652	59.73%	6,689	3.89%
2016	67,141	34.98%	102,753	53.53%	22,056	11.49%
2020	80,336	36.15%	134,366	60.46%	7,551	3.40%
2024	77,376	36.62%	125,775	59.53%	8,134	3.85%

== Economy ==
As of 2022, Lane County has the fifth-largest gross domestic product among Oregon's 36 counties, totaling $17.55 billion.

Tourism has become a key driver of the local economy, with direct visitor spending reaching $1.1 billion in 2023, and total travel spending hitting a record $1.4 billion.

PeaceHealth Medical Group is the largest employer in Lane County, followed by the University of Oregon, Eugene 4J School District, and U.S. Government.

Growth in the next decades is predicted to shift away from timber and agriculture to services, manufacturing of transportation equipment, printing and publishing, and high technology.

== Communities ==
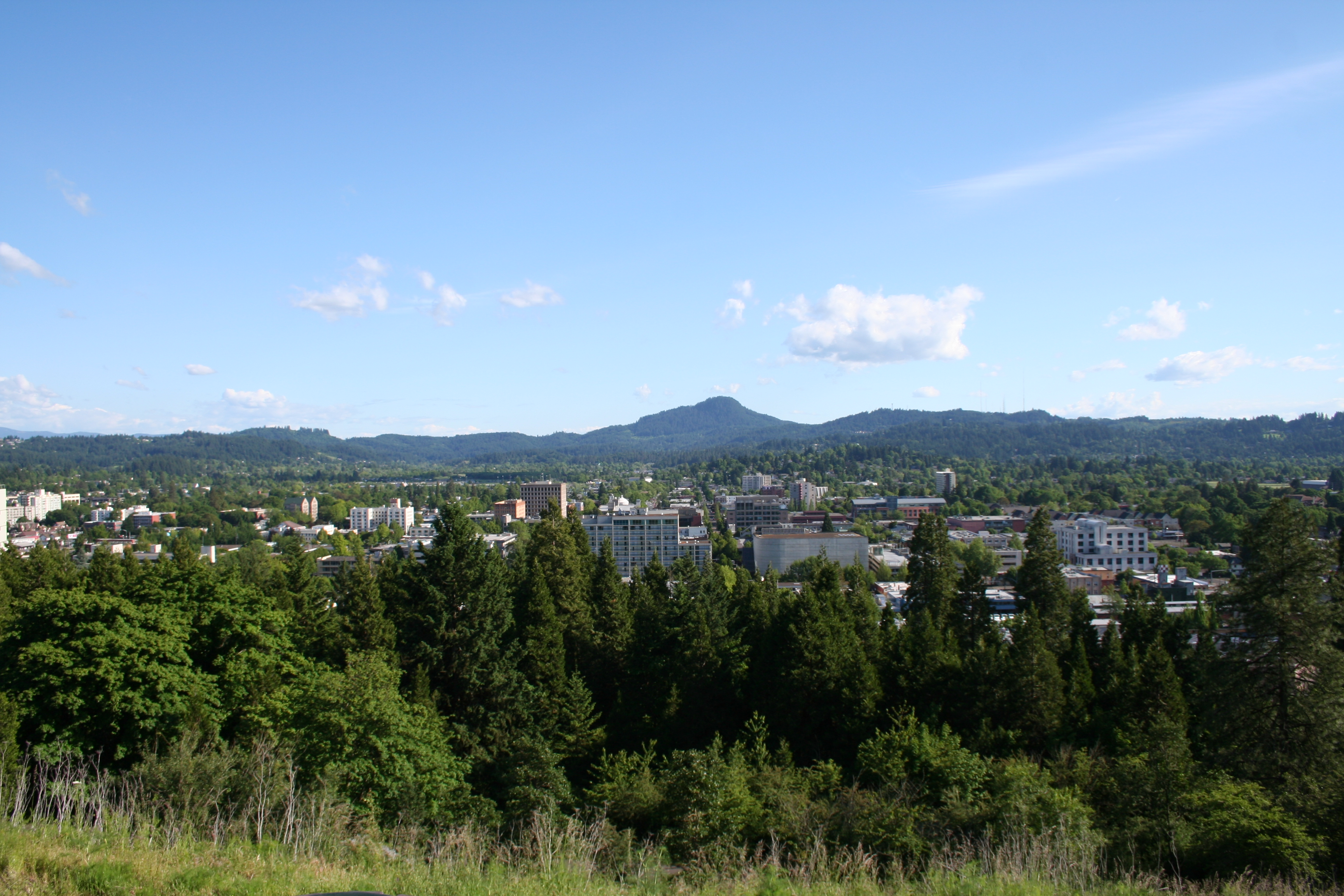
Downtown Eugene

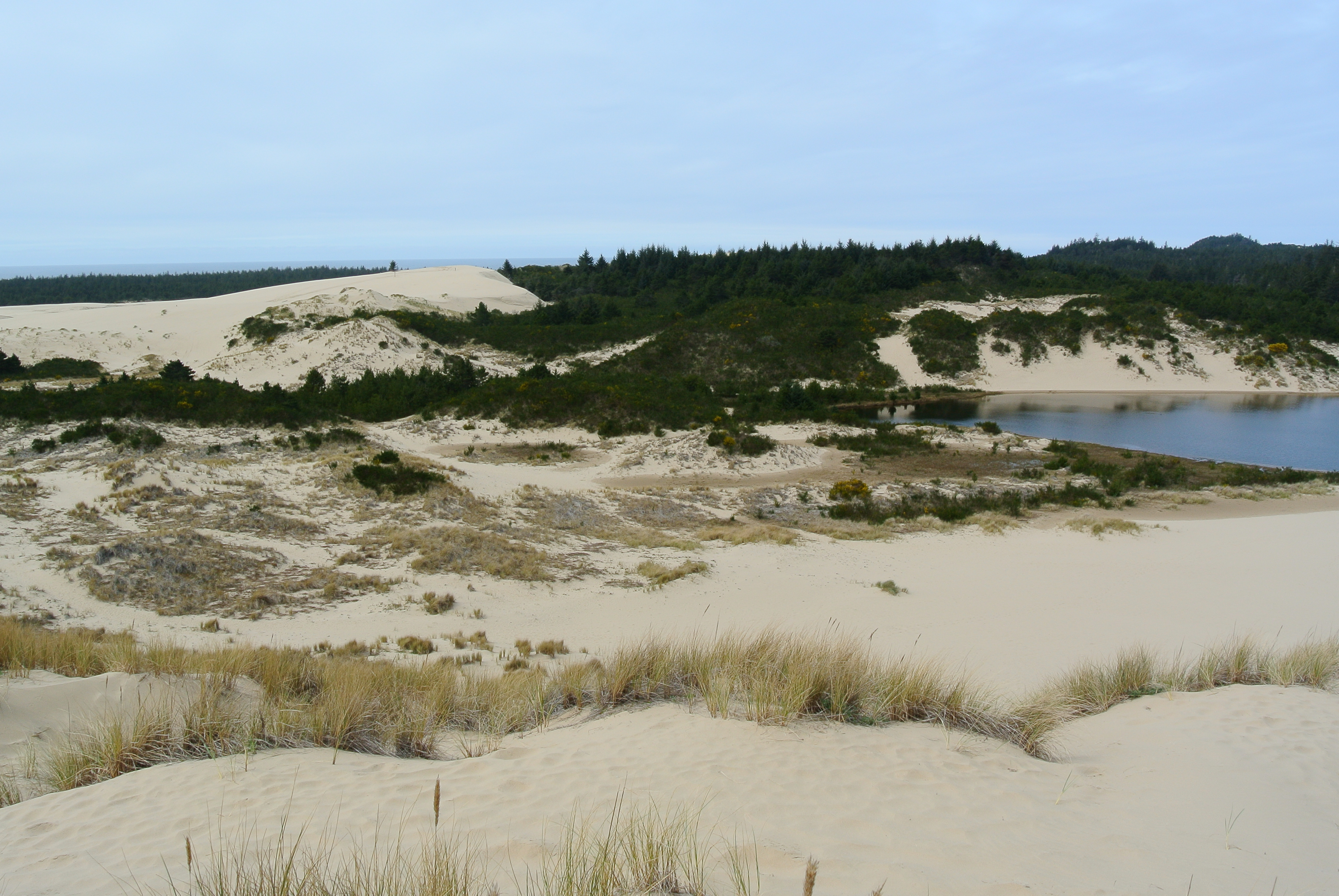
Jessie M. Honeyman Memorial State Park and part of Cleawox Lake, Oregon Dunes National Recreation Area, south of Florence

=== Incorporated cities ===
- Coburg
- Cottage Grove
- Creswell
- Dunes City
- Eugene (county seat)
- Florence
- Junction City
- Lowell
- Oakridge
- Springfield
- Veneta
- Westfir

=== Census-designated places ===
- Cheshire
- Dexter
- Elmira
- Heceta Beach
- Jasper
- Mapleton
- Marcola
- River Road
- Santa Clara
- Trent

=== Other unincorporated communities ===
- Ada
- Alpha
- Alvadore
- Austa
- Belknap Springs
- Blachly
- Blue River
- Camp Creek
- Canary
- Cedar Flat
- Cheshire
- Cloverdale
- Crow
- Culp Creek
- Cushman
- Deadwood
- Deerhorn
- Dexter
- Disston
- Dorena
- Elmira
- Finn Rock
- Glenada
- Glenwood
- Goldson
- Goshen
- Greenleaf
- Heceta
- Horton
- Indiola
- Inlow
- Jasper
- Lancaster
- Latham
- Leaburg
- Linslaw
- London Springs
- Lorane
- Low Pass
- Mabel
- Malabon
- Mapleton
- Marcola
- McKenzie Bridge
- Minerva
- Mohawk
- Nimrod
- North Beach
- Noti
- Pleasant Hill
- Rainbow
- Riverview
- Saginaw
- Santa Clara
- Siltcoos
- Swisshome
- Tide
- Tiernan
- Trent
- Triangle Lake
- Unity
- Vaughn
- Vida
- Walden
- Walker
- Walterville
- Walton
- Wendling
- Westlake
- Wildwood

=== Former communities ===
- Alma
- Bethel, now part of Eugene
- Black Butte
- Bohemia City
- Divide
- Irving, now part of Eugene
- Luper
- McCredie Springs
- Natron
- Thurston, now part of Springfield

== Education ==
School districts include:

- Alsea School District 7J
- Bethel School District 52
- Blachly School District 090
- Creswell School District 40
- Crow-Applegate-Lorane School District 66
- Eugene School District 4J
- Fern Ridge School District 28J
- Harrisburg School District 7J
- Junction City School District 69
- Lincoln County School District
- Lowell School District 71
- Mapleton School District 32
- Marcola School District 79J
- McKenzie School District 68
- Monroe School District 1J
- Oakridge School District 76
- Pleasant Hill School District 1
- Siuslaw School District 97J
- South Lane School District 45J
- Springfield School District 19

== See also ==
- Lane Education Service District
- National Register of Historic Places listings in Lane County, Oregon
