= Driftwood Shores Resort =

Resort

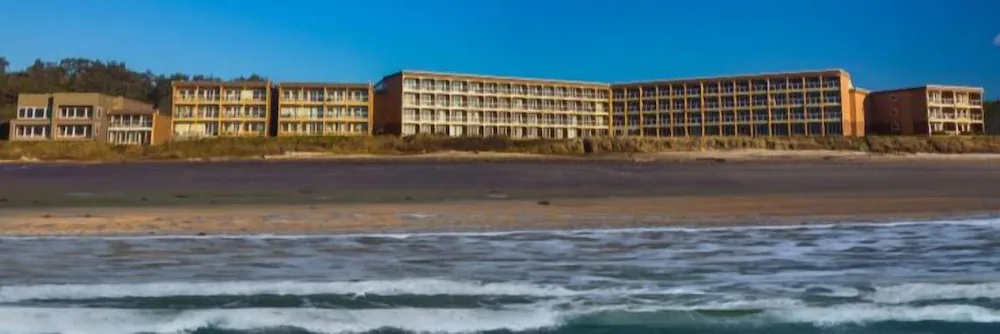
- Type: Private
- Industry: Travel and tourism
- Predecessor: Driftwood Shores Surfside Resort Inn; Driftwood Shores, Inc.; Driftwood Shores Condominium; Driftwood Shores
- Founded: January 20, 1968; 58 years ago in Lane County, Oregon
- Founder: Jacob L. Mann
- Headquarters: 88416 1st Avenue, Florence, Oregon 97439
- Key people: Reginald Marvin, General Manager; Gerry Hauck, Controller, Human Resources Manager

Driftwood Shores Resort is a beachfront property on the north side of Florence, Oregon, located adjacent to Heceta Beach, about a mile north of the Siuslaw jetties. Driftwood Shores was built between 1968 and 1972, owned and operated originally by Jacob Mann as a condominium and hotel. In late 1976, Mann defaulted on a $1.45 million loan, and the property was claimed by Master Bank Line Trust of San Diego.

Driftwood Shores units were subsequently sold to individual homeowners for a total of $2.9 million, and the Driftwood Shores Home Owners Association was formed. Most of the Resort's rooms are managed in a rental pool on behalf of individual owners.

Following a 1985 fire in the restaurant area opposite the lobby entrance, the homeowners association purchased land on its north border to build a new restaurant and conference center.

Driftwood Shores Resort hosts a variety of events in its facilities, its Bistro, and on the adjacent beach.

== Description ==
Driftwood Shores Resort offers 124 furnished rooms, configured as standard queen, kitchenette queen, double queen, deluxe king, and three bedroom suites, each with oceanfront view and balcony or deck. Pets are allowed in some rooms for a fee.

The Resort includes a Bistro and meeting rooms, as well as a recreation center with a pool, hot tub and wading pool, and an indoor playground. Electric car charging stations are available free in the guest parking.

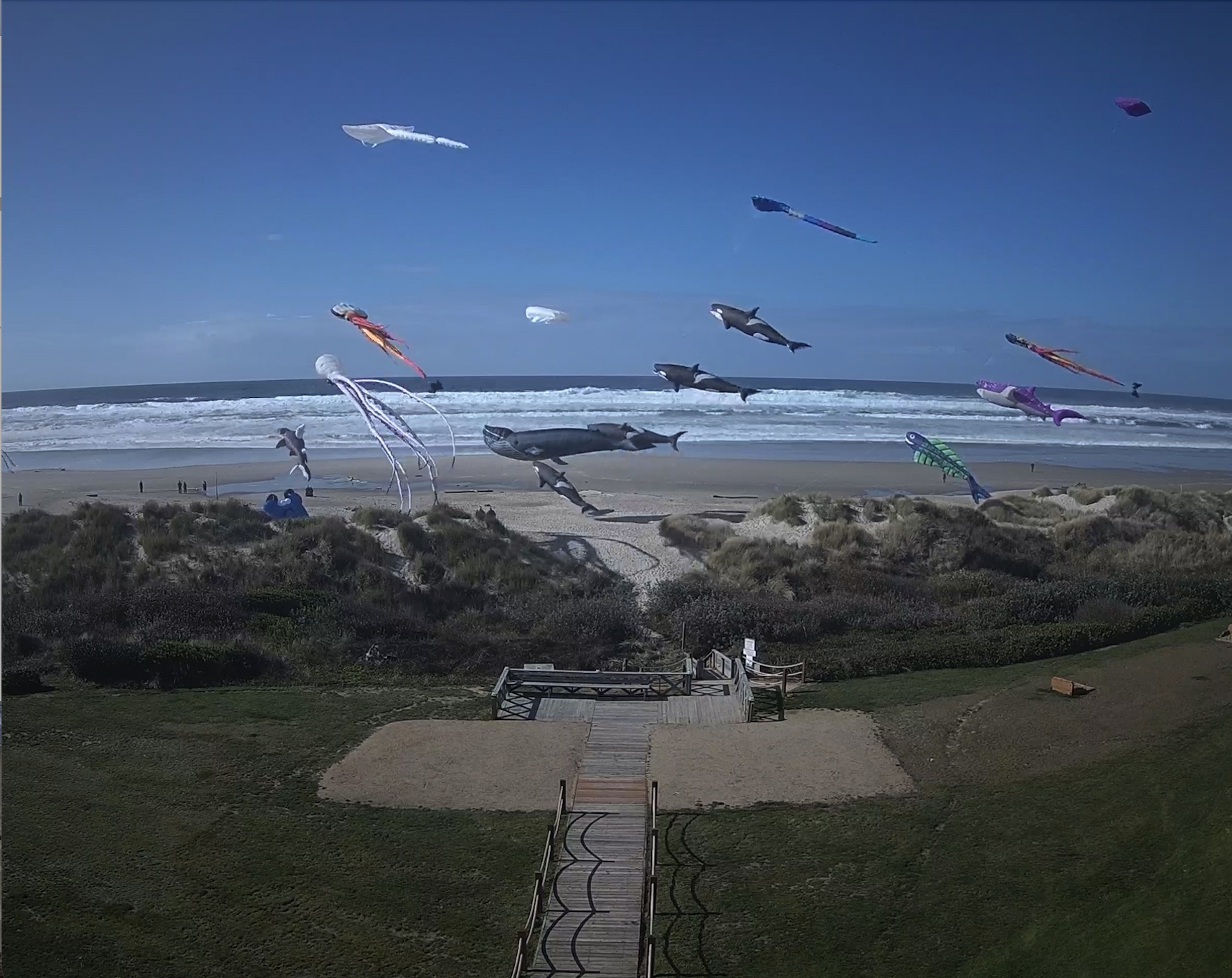
Balloon kites at Driftwood Shores Reort

The Resort hosts events such as the "Women's Wellness - Oregon Coast Expo" in April 2025, and the "Circles in the sand beach labyrinth and art draw", which occurs annually in October. Wedding venues at Driftwood Shores include a boardwalk and deck overlooking Heceta Beach, as well as banquet rooms with ocean views.

== History ==
=== Planning and development by J. L. Mann ===
On January 20, 1968, Jacob L. Mann, owner of Rhodo-Dunes Golf Course and former owner and operator of Swiss Home Logging Company, announced plans to build a 95-unit oceanfront condominium, "Driftwood Shores". The development was planned to occupy 4.6 acres, with 800 feet of ocean frontage, six miles north of downtown Florence, Oregon, at a cost of $2.5 million. Initial plans for the complex, designed by Joseph Warfield Young, included 95 apartments, as well as a restaurant, dining room, and a swimming pool, with a projected completion date in May 1968. The general contractor for the building project was Thompson Construction, Inc., of Portland, with financing by Security Bank of Oregon.

Mann announced a February 1, 1968, ground-breaking for the first two-story, two apartment building. Highway engineers surveyed the property lines, with concerns about potential damage to a beach access road. An aerial photo published February 11, 1968, shows a "Huge pile of driftwood" between the graded 5-acre site and the ocean beach. Developers were permitted to burn the driftwood on the beach.

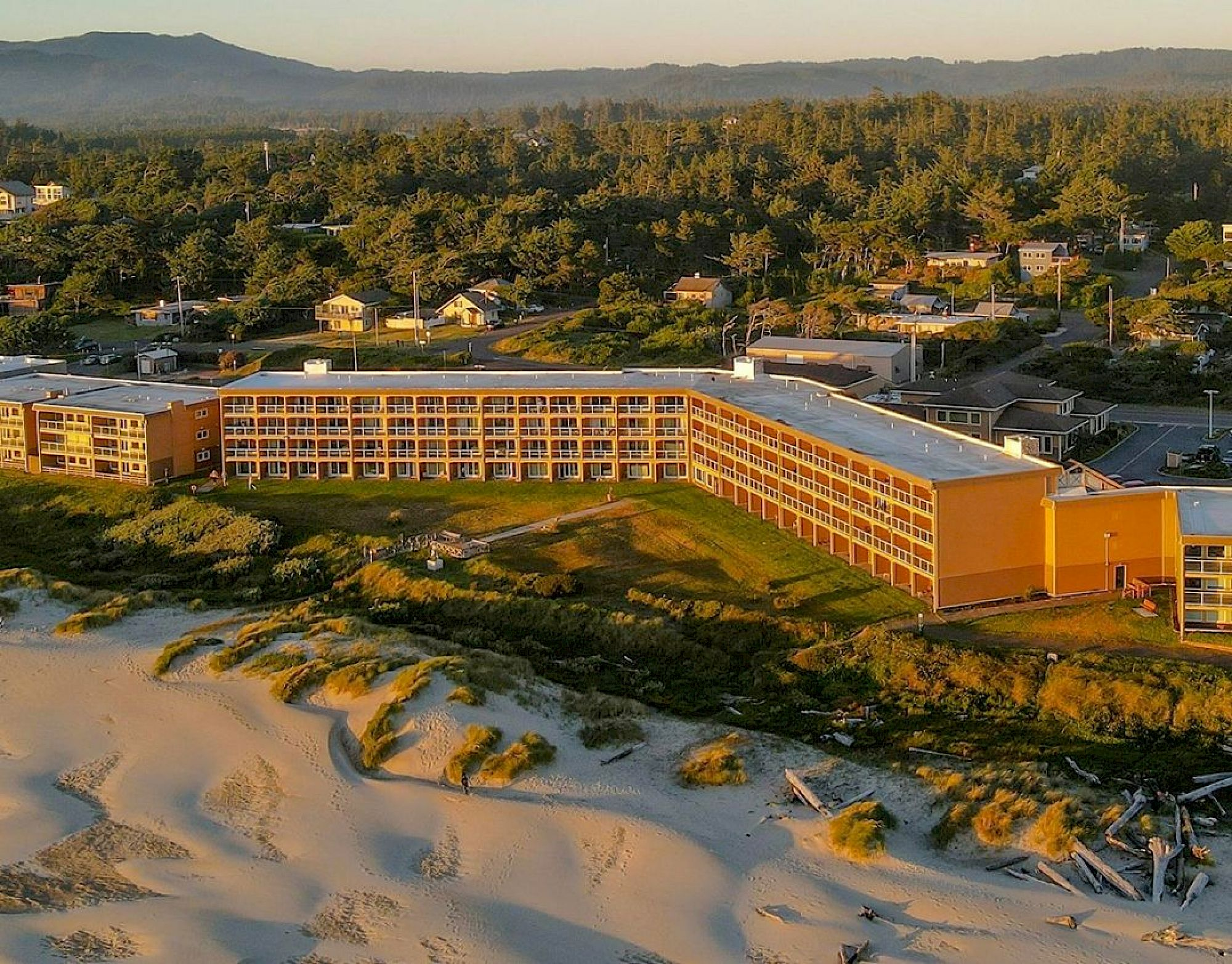
Driftwood Shores Resort beachfront

At the end of March 1968, the developers deeded approximately 800 ocean frontage feet to the public, "to assist the state in preserving the beach for public use and recreational purposes in line with the beach bill passed by the 1967 Legislature". "Driftwood Shores Condominium" advertised an advantage of condominium units in July 1968: "Condominium owners may realize appreciation by virtue of owning (not leasing) the land in this exclusive section of Oregon's coast."

In January 1972, Driftwood Shores, Inc., had contacted the U.S. Army Corps of Engineers to request a three-inch sewer outfall into the Siuslaw River to be placed north of Florence. By February 1972 the $3 million condominium-hotel was only 75 per cent complete, with Jake Mann, U.S. Financial of San Diego, and Swan Constructors of San Diego listed as partners in the project. At its "Grand Opening" in May 1972, it was called "Driftwood Shores Surfside Resort Inn". Mann and his wife then operated the resort as a motel, retaining ownership of 50 units after the sale. A liquor license was granted to the Driftwood Shores Restaurant in July 1972.

In July 1973, Mann announced that Driftwood Shores, Inc., had assumed total ownership of the 136-unit resort. Mann bought out the interest of one of the corporation's partners, U.S. Financial of San Diego, which had declared bankruptcy.

Mann offered 86 units for sale in October 1976, "to help pay off construction loans". According to Mann, the collapse of another big Oregon resort development "rocked the Oregon resort condo market so badly" that he was not able to make any sales. Mann also said, "...the banks are taking a little under 50 cents on the dollar", to minimize losses, and long-term financing for the resort was not available, as banks were no longer interested in condominiums. Studio units were priced at $26,500, and suites were priced at $52,000. The World of Coos Bay reported that units were being sold to amortize construction loans, with Mann's corporation to retain ownership of 52 units to be rented to the public. Mann said the small turnout of about 100 people at the sale had prompted him to change the sales strategy to pricing with a minimum bid.

Driftwood Shores, Inc., protested the 1976 valuation of the property at $2,123,470, in the Oregon Tax Court. However, the Oregon Supreme Court upheld the valuation.

By November 12, 1976, condominium sales had totaled about $720,000, well short of paying the balance of the remaining $1.45 million loan. Master Bank Line Trust of San Diego, California, then claimed both the resort and Mann's golf course (which later became Ocean Dunes Golf Links), because Mann was unable to pay off his loan on Driftwood Shores. The sale was finally completed in late January 1977, when Jerry Strasheim of Northwest Auction Company in Portland purchased Driftwood Shores at a cost of $1.4 million and more than $200,000 in back taxes.

=== Driftwood Shores Resort Homeowners Association ===
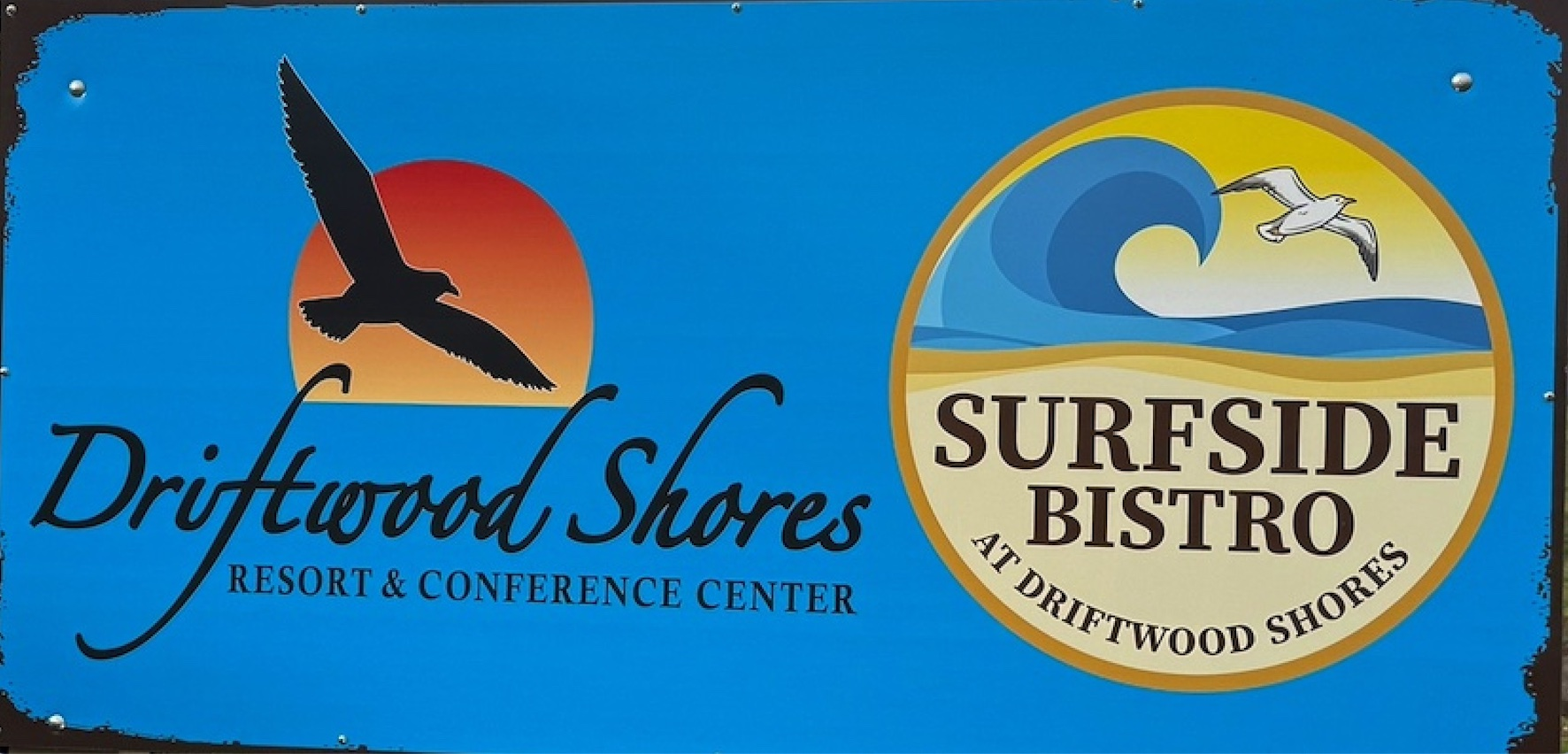
Driftwood Shores Resort entrance sign

In June 1977 realtor Bill Headlee of the Oregon Management Group, Inc., announced the selling price for units would start at $23,500. In August 1977, Strasheim announced earnings of $2.9 million upon the sale of all the units. In January 1978, Jerry Herr was named general manager of the property.

The Driftwood Shores Homeowners Association was incorporated under the Oregon Nonprofit Corporation Act. It was formed to govern the Resort, and it elects a seven-member Board of directors that engages a general manager and staff. The Board officers include a chair, vice-chair, secretary, and treasurer. It meets monthly with the general manager and staff, and reports to homeowners via meeting minutes and in-person during the Association's annual meeting.

One of the early homeowners at Driftwood Shores was Don Brudvig, who had also become a two-term mayor of Albany, Oregon, beginning in 1980. He not only served as treasurer and member of the Driftwood Shores Home Owners Association Board for over 40 years, Brudvig is also credited with the idea to "create a rental pool where owners would profit".

When an electrical panel in the restaurant exploded in May 1985, the fire spread to the rest of the building, causing estimated damages of $100,000 –150,000. Electrician Hal Hylton, who had first- and second-degree burns, was rescued by three other employees.

Following the fire in 1985, the Driftwood Shores Homeowners Association met and approved funding of $1,200,000, for the purchase of land adjacent to the north side of the existing property. Funds for relocating and rebuilding the restaurant and conference center were to be assessed of the membership. At two subsequent meetings, the Association approved an additional 10% assessment on each unit to finance the facility. Owners of one unit in the Association objected to the increased assessment and brought suit. The case was settled in favor of the Homeowners Association in November 1993.

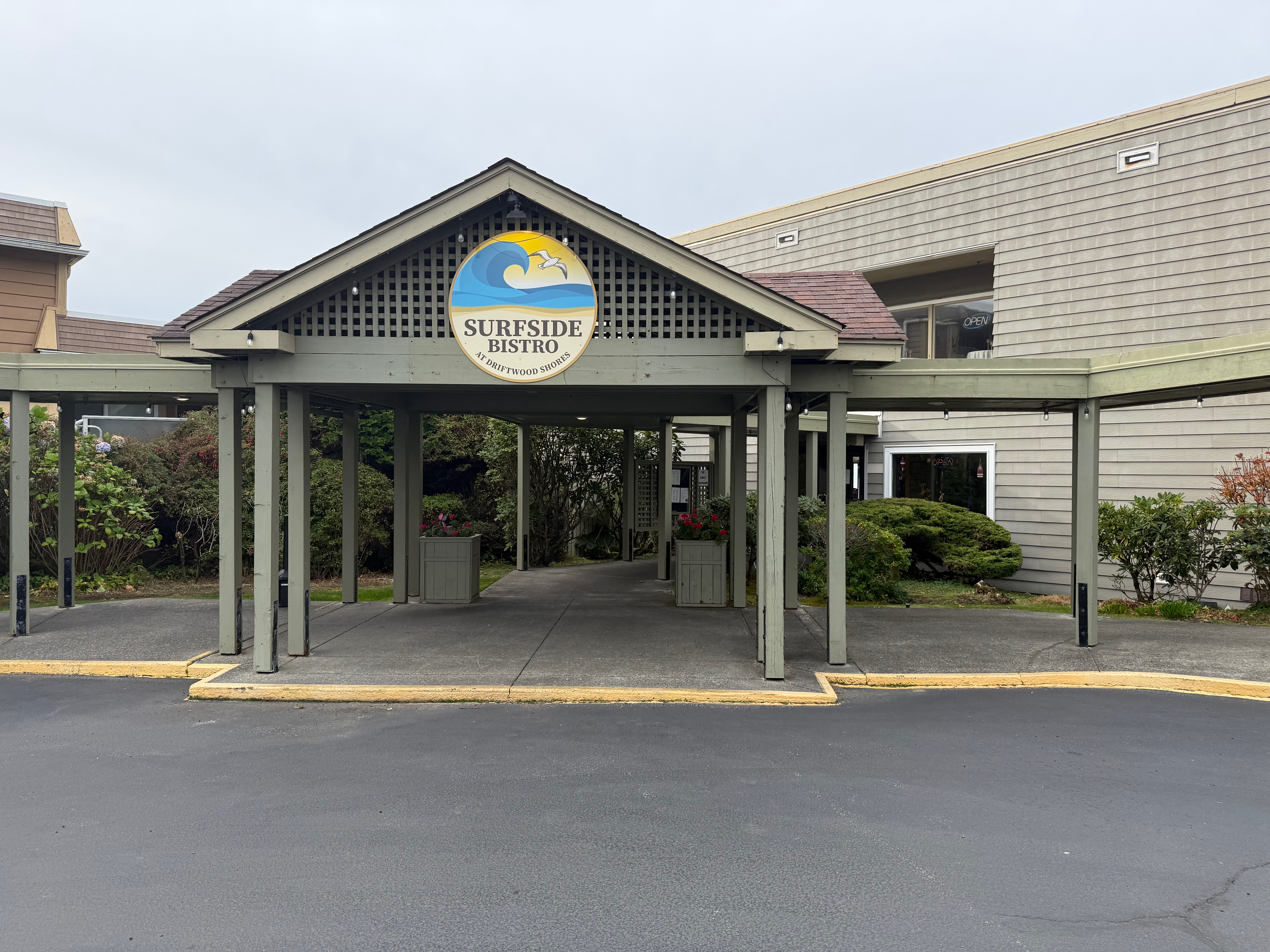
Bistro entrance at Driftwood Shores Resort

The former Driftwood Shores Restaurant became the "Surfside Bistro at Driftwood Shores" in 2025. The menu includes the "Exploding whale burger", clam chowder, deli items, fresh pastries, as well as breakfast, lunch, and dinner entrees, offered by Executive Chef Adam Berbereia.

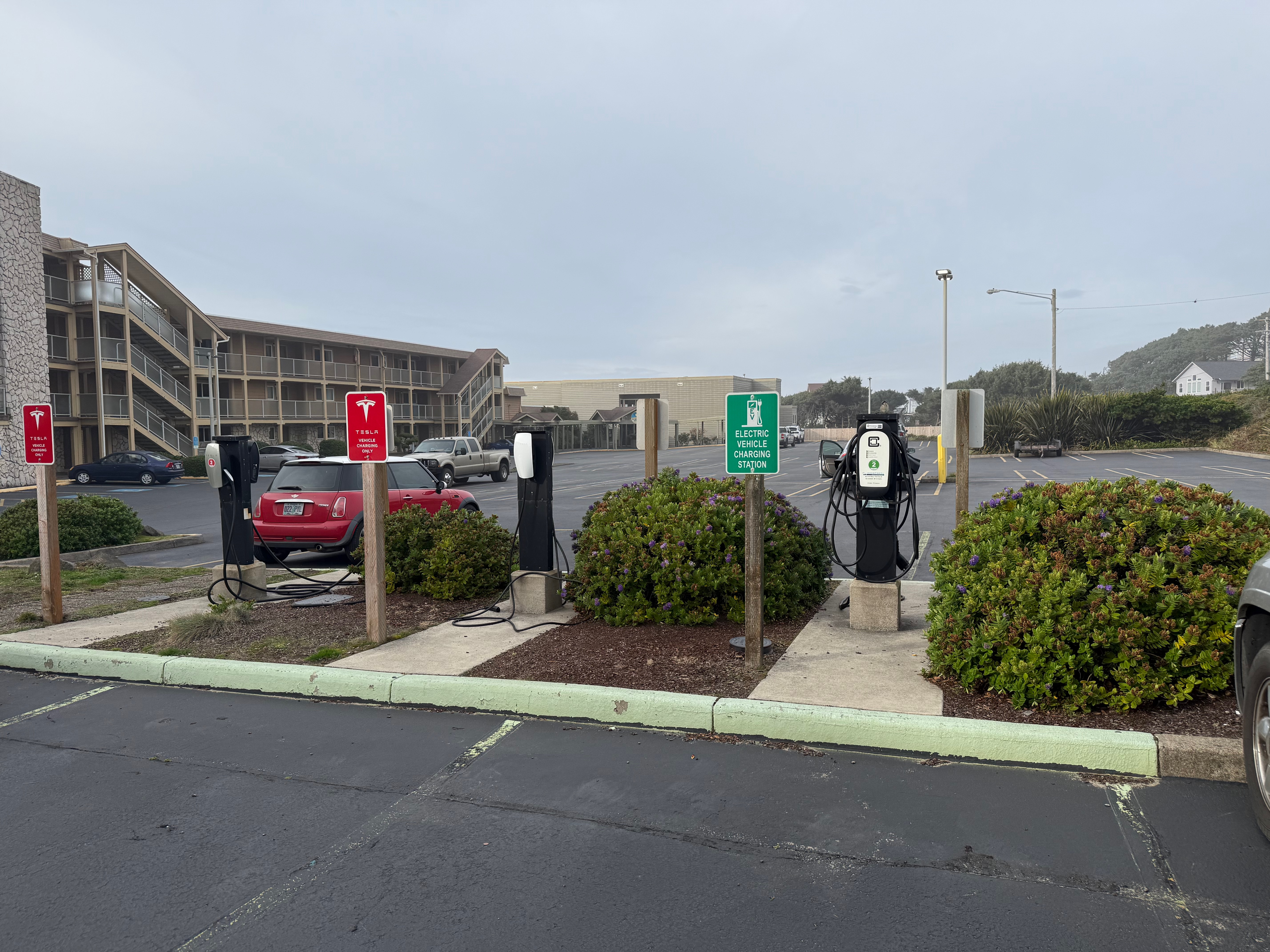
Electric vehicle charging stations

Driftwood Shores celebrated Florence's 86th annual Rhododendron Festival in 1993 by hosting a "Centennial SockHop", marking the centennial of the city's incorporation in 1893. In 2008, the city of Florence, Oregon, annexed Driftwood Shores.

Driftwood Shores installed its first charging station for electric vehicles in August 2011. Subsequently two more charging stations were installed, including a Tesla station.

Squiggly, made of marine debris and litter

In July 2026, Driftwood Shores accepted a permanent public art sculpture donated by Washed Ashore (an Artula Institute for Art and Environmental Education project). Composed of plastic marine debris found on Oregon beaches, the sculpture is a "whimsical, 12-foot-tall jellyfish" named Squiggly, installed on the south side of the aquatic center.

== News events ==
A variety of incidents at Driftwood Shores Resort have made the news:

- On July 4, 1969, 54 year-old Alvin Marvil Amondson of Eugene drowned in the surf at Driftwood Shores while swimming with his son: "Amondson and his son Larry, 15, were swimming at Heceta Beach, north of Florence, July 4. A big wave was coming in and the father said, 'Let's dive through it.' After the wave, with the water over their heads, the father said, 'You go ahead, Larry. I'll make it OK.' Larry saw his father floating on his back as he headed in. When he reached the point where could touch bottom he turned around. The father was no longer in sight."
- Armed robbers in May 1975 forced night employee Andy Ostram to give them the keys to the safe in the office. They took $1,100 in cash.
- Only a month later, on June 17, 1975, a four-year old child went missing at Driftwood Shores, resulting in a massive search involving not only her parents and other guests, but also the Sheriff's Department, Lane County Police, Oregon State Police, as well as U.S. Coast Guardsmen from Newport and the Siuslaw River Station. The child was found four hours later, asleep in the room next door to her family's unit. According to the news report, prior guests staying in that apartment had already checked out, and earlier searchers had missed the sleeping child in the unmade bed.
- In January 1998, Driftwood Shores guest Eileen Reilley fell to her death from a fourth floor balcony. A graduate of the State University of New York School of Health Related Sciences and member of the American Physical Therapy Association, she was a traveling physical therapist based in Eugene, Oregon.
- Beach debris and sewage from a pipe adjacent to Driftwood Shores were investigated in January 2009 by the Coos Bay Department of Environmental Quality. It was subsequently identified as "...a Lane County storm line that collects water from property east of the resort", from drainage basins the other side of First Street. Florence Public Works Director Mike Miller explained that in fact, Driftwood Shores' treated wastewater was being discharged north of the Siuslaw jetties, 1.2 miles south of Driftwood Shores, pending completion of the city's sewer system pump station in June 2009.
- A whale beached itself in March 2009 in shallow water about a mile north of Driftwood Shores. It was discovered early in the day, but when Coast Guard officials and an official from the National Marine Fisheries Service returned to the beach, the partially beached whale had freed itself. The whale kept swimming in and near the surf zone, remaining free.

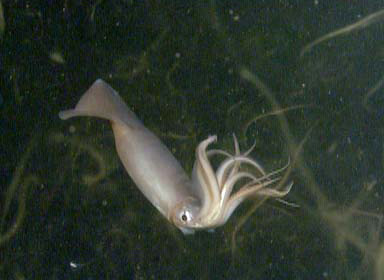
Humboldt squid, Dosidicus gigas

- The Eugene Register-Guard reported in September 2009 that dozens of Humbolt squid beached at Driftwood Shores. The Humboldt squid (predators that may be up to 6 feet in length, and weigh up to 100 pounds) were about 2 feet in length, with purple, red and white skin, and two diamond-shaped fins. A researcher at UCLA cited climate change as the cause of the growing numbers of beached squid: "Global warming is causing a zone of low-oxygen deep water to move closer to the surface."
- Also in 2009, the National Weather Service issued a tsunami warning, but "...it was about as minimal an alert as they come", predicting waves increasing by 6 to 10 inches. Coastal residents were admonished to stay away from the ocean and its edge. The wave was caused by a magnitude 8.0 earthquake, which had already been lethal to dozens in Samoa and American Samoa.
- Driftwood Shores' bookkeeper stole approximately $17,000 in cash tips received by the resort's restaurant between July 2016 and June 2017. Although she initially denied stealing the money, when shown evidence she admitted the thefts. General manager Martin Alletson reimbursed restaurant workers whose tips had been stolen.
- In March 2026, an emaciated dead juvenile male gray whale, measuring 37 feet long, washed ashore in front of Driftwood Shores Resort. According to NBC affiliate KGW8, "members of the Confederated Tribes of Coos, Lower Umpqua and Siuslaw Indians came out to harvest parts of the whale in accordance with their cultural practices, Oregon State Parks said, before the rest of the carcass was buried."

== Other "Driftwood Shores" ==
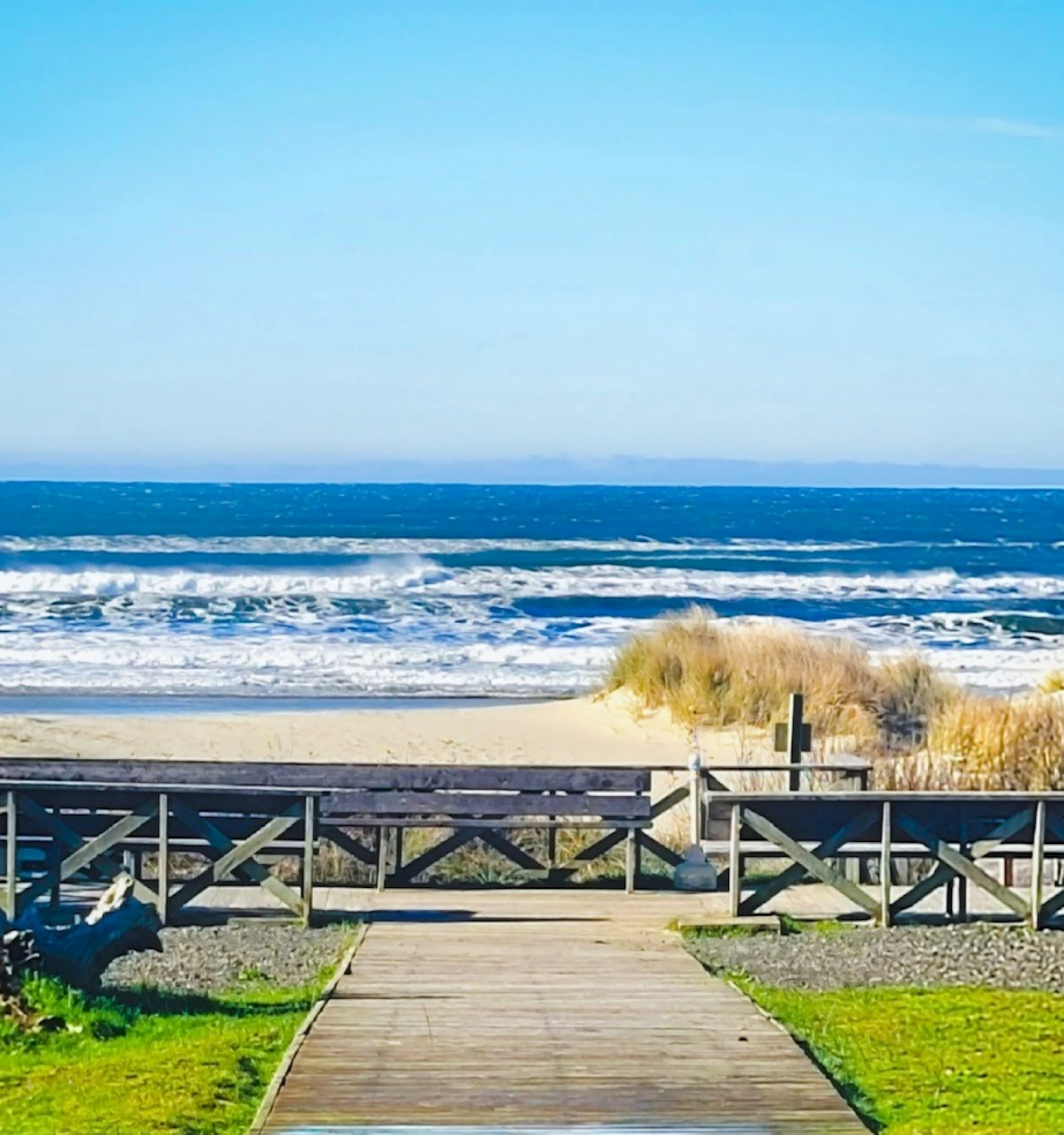
Boardwalk and Deck at Driftwood Shores Resort

There are other properties named "Driftwood Shores", but Driftwood Shores Resort is not affiliated with any other "Driftwood Shores" properties, including:

- Driftwood Shores Homes – Gulf Shores Alabama
- Driftwood Shores Homes – Reeds Spring, Missouri
- Driftwood Shores at Wolf Point – Texas
- Driftwood Shores – Washington
- Driftwood Shores – Australia

== See also ==
- Driftwood Beach State Recreation Site
- Driftwood Inn and Restaurant – in Vero Beach, Florida
- Oregon Coast
