= Siuslaw Pioneer Museum =

American history museum

Coordinates: 43°58′06″N 124°06′21″W

- Formation: June 4, 1974; 51 years ago
- Founded at: Florence, Oregon
- Legal status: Non-profit 501(c)3 educational and archival organization
- Headquarters: 278 Maple Street; Florence, Oregon
- Website: siuslawpioneermuseum.com

The Siuslaw Pioneer Museum documents the local history of the Siuslaw Region and Florence, Oregon, from times of indigenous peoples preceding White settlement in the late 1800's to the present.

== Description ==
The museum is a 501(c)(3) non-profit focused on the Siuslaw region, with the stated mission, "The Siuslaw Pioneer Museum is an educational and repository facility that demonstrates the history, the vision, the vitality, and the values and culture of the peoples of the Siuslaw Valley and coastal region."

Museum artifacts include "items brought across the Oregon and Applegate Trails, prized pieces from local first-nations people, industry and household implements from the 1800's, and archives of directories, yearbooks, and newspapers". The Museum also has bone fragments of the November 1970 exploding whale, called "Florence's most infamous moment" by local press.

== History ==
The Siuslaw Pioneer Association, formed in 1920, began to discuss establishing a museum as early as 1946. The Association finally formed the Siuslaw Pioneer Museum Association in 1969, and it received a donation from the City of Florence of $5,000 toward the purchase of property for the museum, to be used within five years. After several years of successful fund-raising, in 1973 the museum association presented four potential properties to the Siuslaw Pioneer Association, which approved the property of the former Lutheran Church of Glenada, located a mile south of the Siuslaw River Bridge. The Museum dedication in that building took place June 15, 1974.

In 1975, with grant support from the American Revolution Bicentennial Commission of Oregon, poet Kim Stafford began the Museum's Oral History Project. He interviewed locals, making cassette tapes that were maintained by the Siuslaw Pioneer Museum. Museum volunteers conducted additional interviews, growing the collection to more than 200 cassette tapes. According to Museum librarian Pearl Campbell, by 2002 the collection included "individual files on 768 Siuslaw Valley families and hundreds of subjects such as area shipwrecks. Museum patrons can read letters written by early pioneers, view old pictures, check census data, read transcripts of interviews with old-timers, peruse records of 11 area cemeteries, and browse through 1,100 books." These tapes were converted to CDs beginning in 2022, and a complete set presented to the Siuslaw Public Library in January 2023.

By June 2005, the Resurrection Lutheran Church agreed to buy the building south of the Siuslaw River Bridge, and the Museum relocated to the 1905 Callison building, which was once Florence Elementary School, in Florence's Old Town. Board president Del Phelps estimated the move could quadruple the museum's attendance in the new location, as visits had lagged because of its isolated location south of Florence.

In 2022, the Siuslaw Pioneer Museum Board raised $88,000 for a fire suppression system to protect the museum's artifacts.
