= Edwin E. Benedict House =

Historic house in Oregon, United States

- U.S. National Register of Historic Places
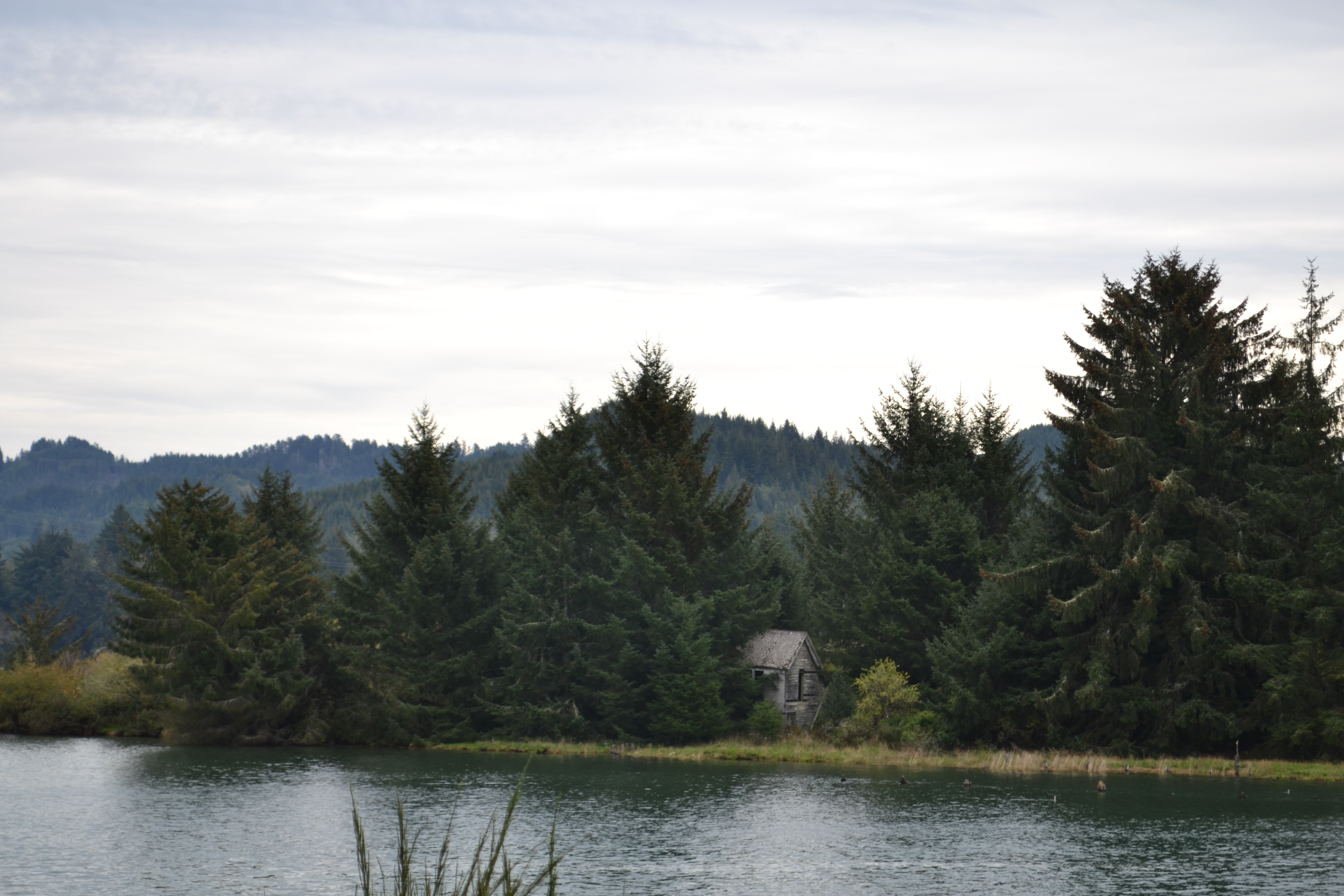
- The Benedict House in 2011
- Location: Cox Island, Siuslaw River
- Nearest city: Florence, Oregon
- Coordinates: 43°58′31″N 124°04′01″W
- Area: 4.5 acres (1.8 ha)
- Built: 1902
- Architectural style: Rural Gothic
- NRHP reference No.: 79002090
- Added to NRHP: October 18, 1979

The Edwin E. Benedict House was a historic house located on Cox Island in the Siuslaw River, near Florence, Oregon, United States.

The house was listed on the National Register of Historic Places in 1979.

== See also ==
- National Register of Historic Places listings in Lane County, Oregon
