= Glenada, Oregon =

Unincorporated community in the state of Oregon, United States

- Unincorporated community
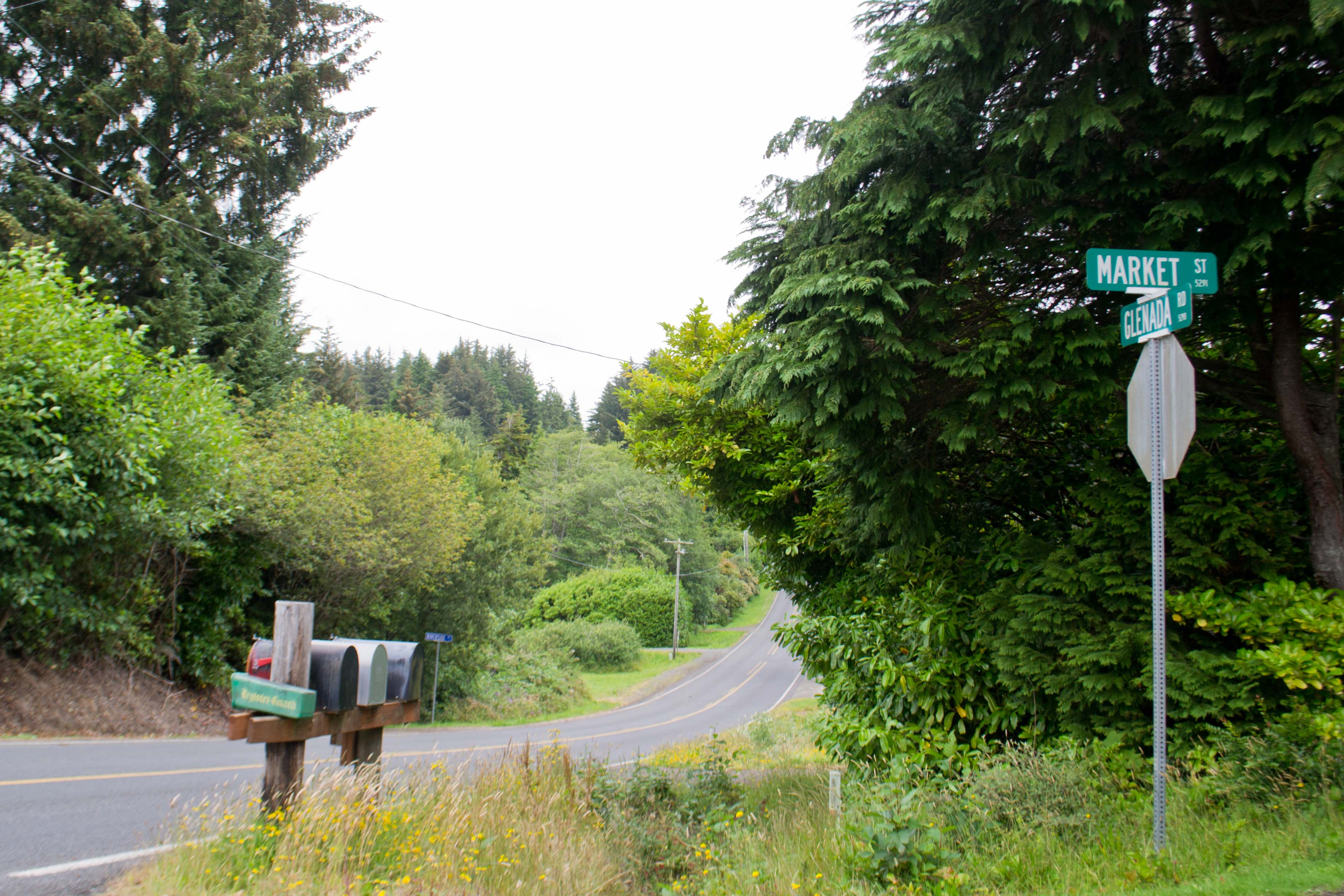

- Location within Oregon Location within the United States
- Coordinates: 43°57′37″N 124°06′14″W
- Country: United States
- State: Oregon
- County: Lane
- Settled: 1889
- Incorporated: 1912
- Disincorporated: 1922
- Founder: George Huestis Colter
- Named for: Jane Ada Grant and Ada Colter
- Elevation: 66 ft (20 m)
- Time zone: UTC-8 (Pacific (PST))
  - Summer (DST): UTC-7 (PDT)
- ZIP code: 97439
- Area codes: 458 and 541
- GNIS feature ID: 1142771

Glenada is an unincorporated community in Lane County, Oregon, United States, across the Siuslaw River from the city of Florence on U.S. Route 101.

== History ==
Glenada was incorporated in 1912 and disincorporated in 1922, after the town's sawmills burned. Glenada was platted by George Huestis Colter (Coulter) (1856-1934) in 1889. Colter purchased an unbroken mile of river frontage and combined the names of his wife, Jane Ada Grant (1849-1946), and youngest daughter, Ada Colter (1895-1998), to name the town of Glen-ada in their honor. The United States Postal Service condensed the name to Glenada.

Colter owned a large amount of land in the area, including four hundred and fifty lots in Glenada, one hundred and 60 acres (240,000 m^{2}) in Fiddle Creek, and also one hundred and 60 acres (240,000 m^{2}) within one mile (1.6 km) of the city of Florence. In addition to these valuable holdings, he owned over 60 acres (240,000 m^{2}) of timber forests adjoining Glenada.

The Glenada Hotel was built to accommodate travelers and also housed the Colter family, costing $4,000 to build.

George Huestis Colter was born on June 12, 1854, in Nova Scotia to Daniel and Almira (Huestis) Colter, the former a native of County Sligo, Ireland, and the latter of Nova Scotia. George left Nova Scotia in 1869 and settled in San Francisco, California. Colter is buried in the Glenada Odd Fellows Cemetery, to which he donated the land and in which family plots were reserved. However, only one grandson, Dean Colter, who drowned, is buried next to him.
