= Siuslaw jetties =

Structures at the entrance of the Siuslaw River

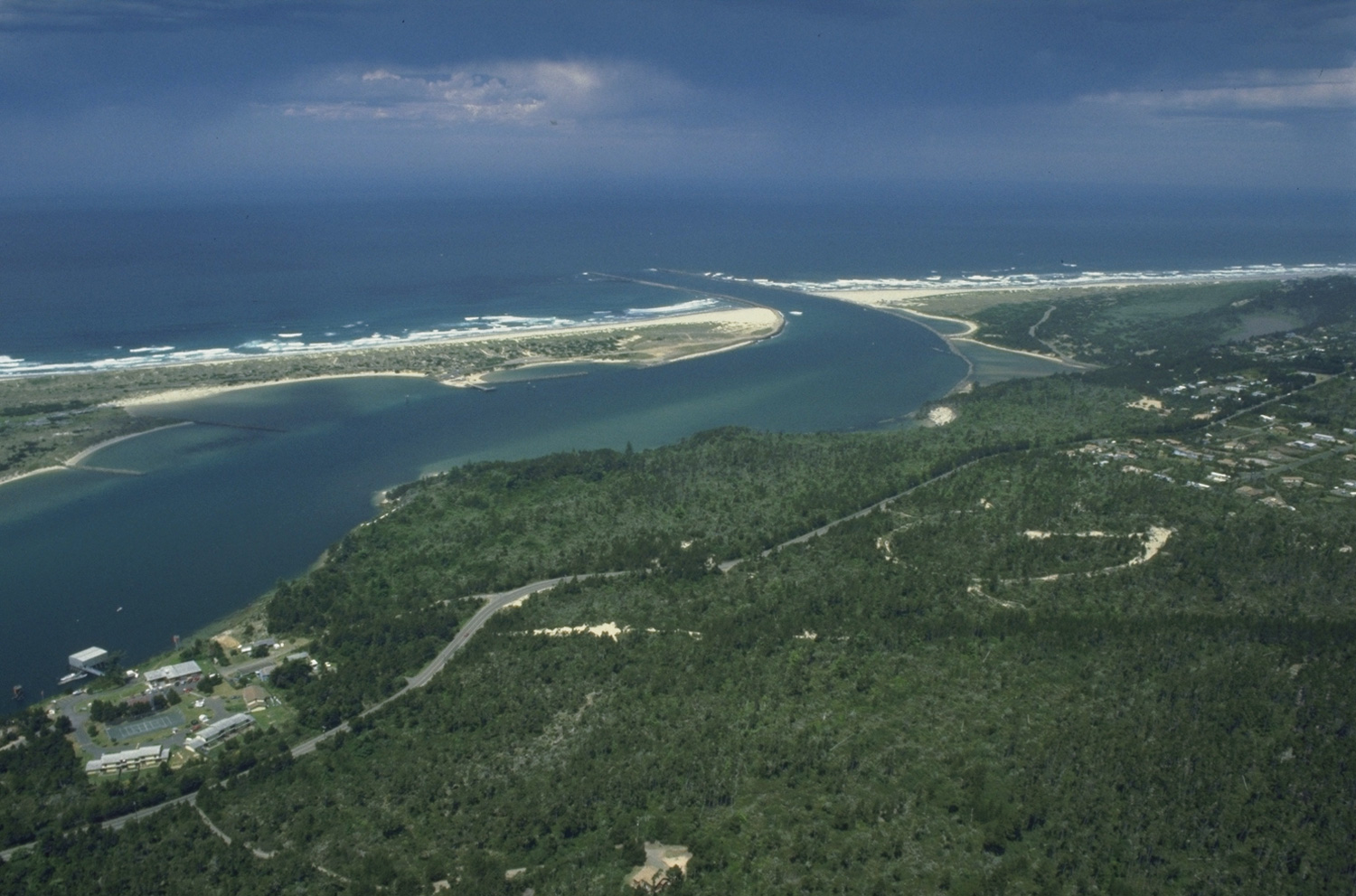
- Aerial view of Siuslaw River and jetties
- Interactive map of Siuslaw jetties

Location
- Country: (United States)
- Location: Florence, Oregon
- Coordinates: 44.0174°N 124.1390°W
- UN/LOCODE: USFQE

Details
- Opened: 1917
- Type of Harbor: Coastal Breakwater
- North jetty: 6,200 feet (1,900 m)
- South jetty: 6,500 feet (2,000 m)
- Channel depth: 18 feet (5.5 m)

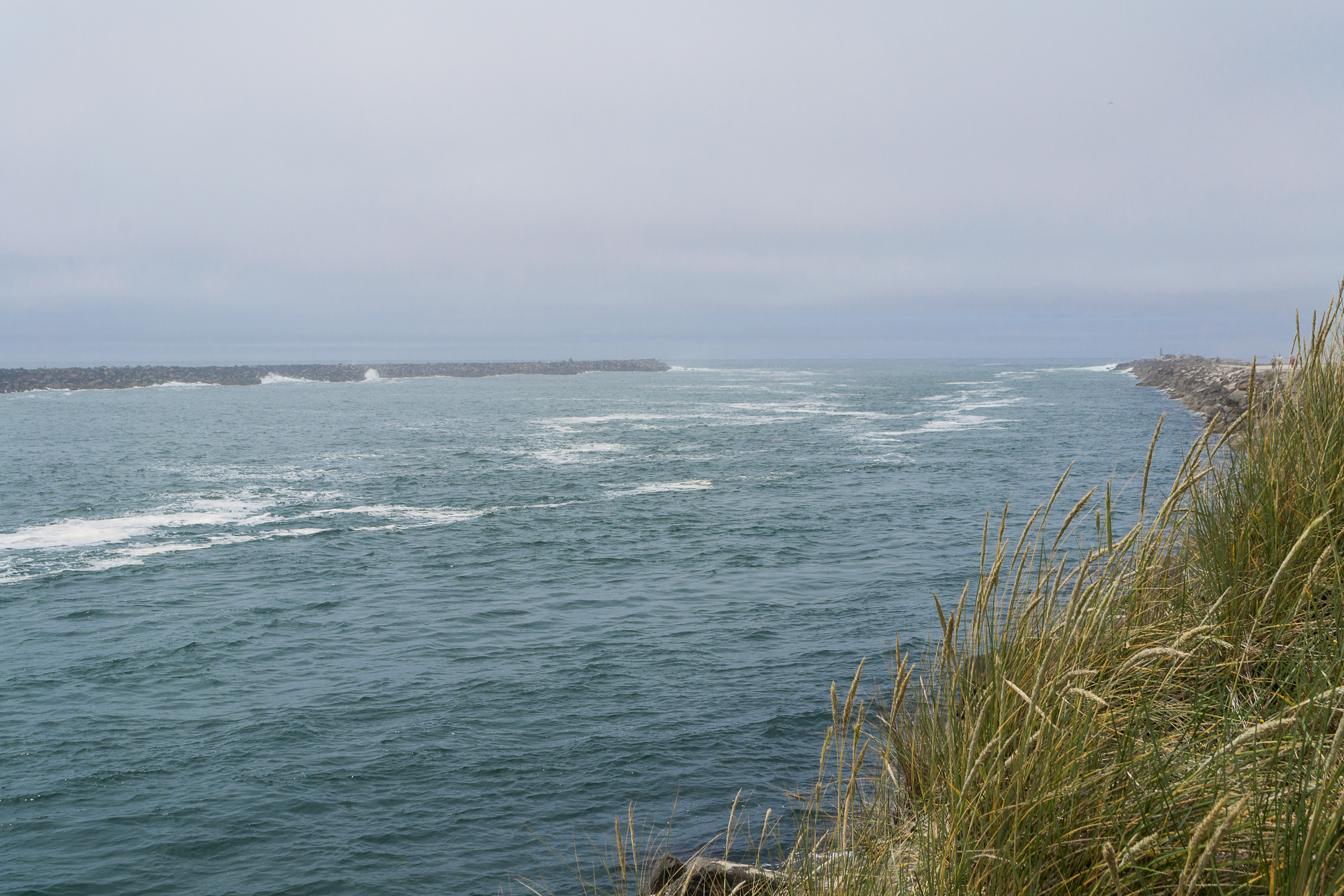
Entrance to the Siuslaw River

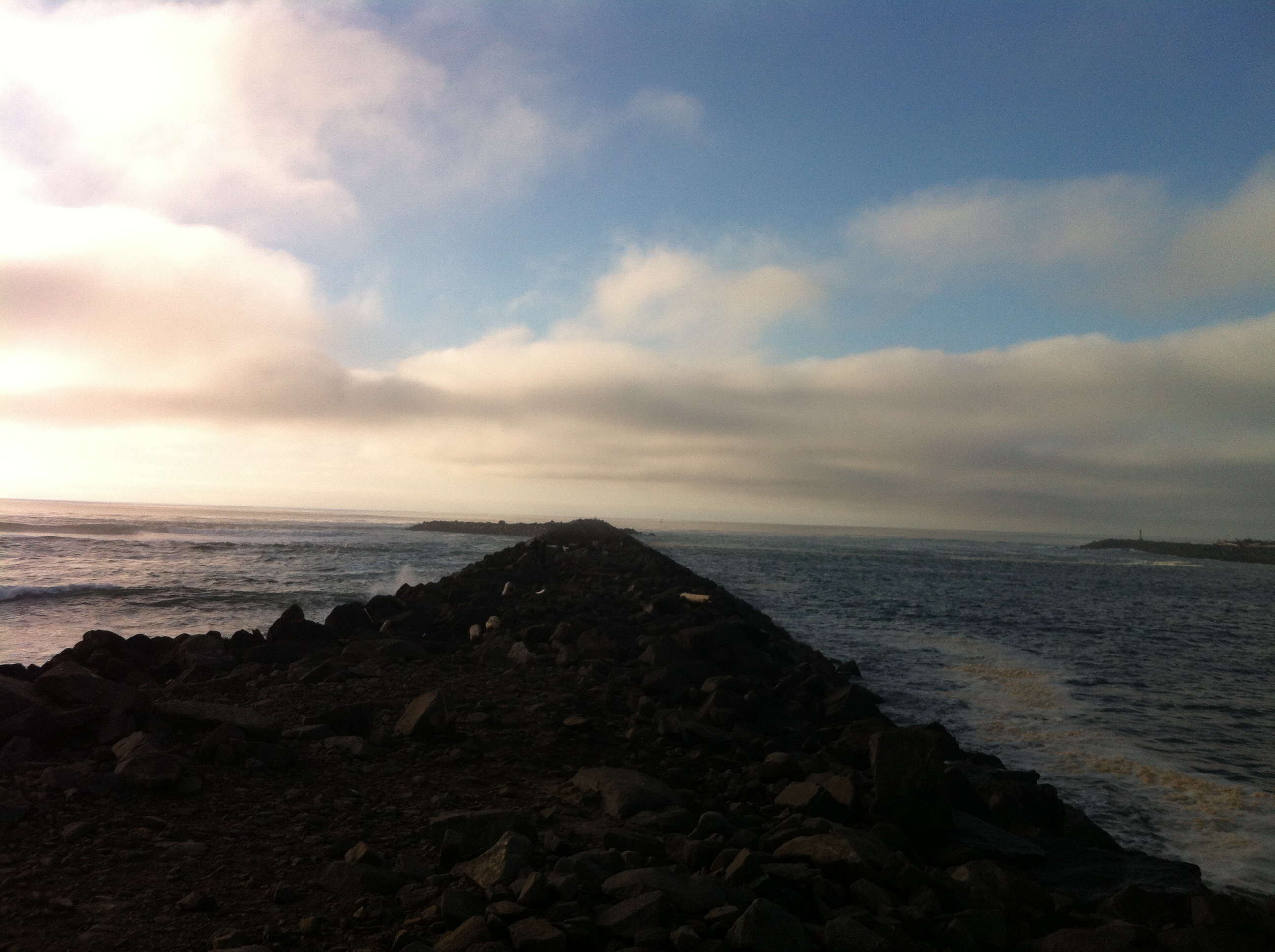
Siuslaw River, south jetty

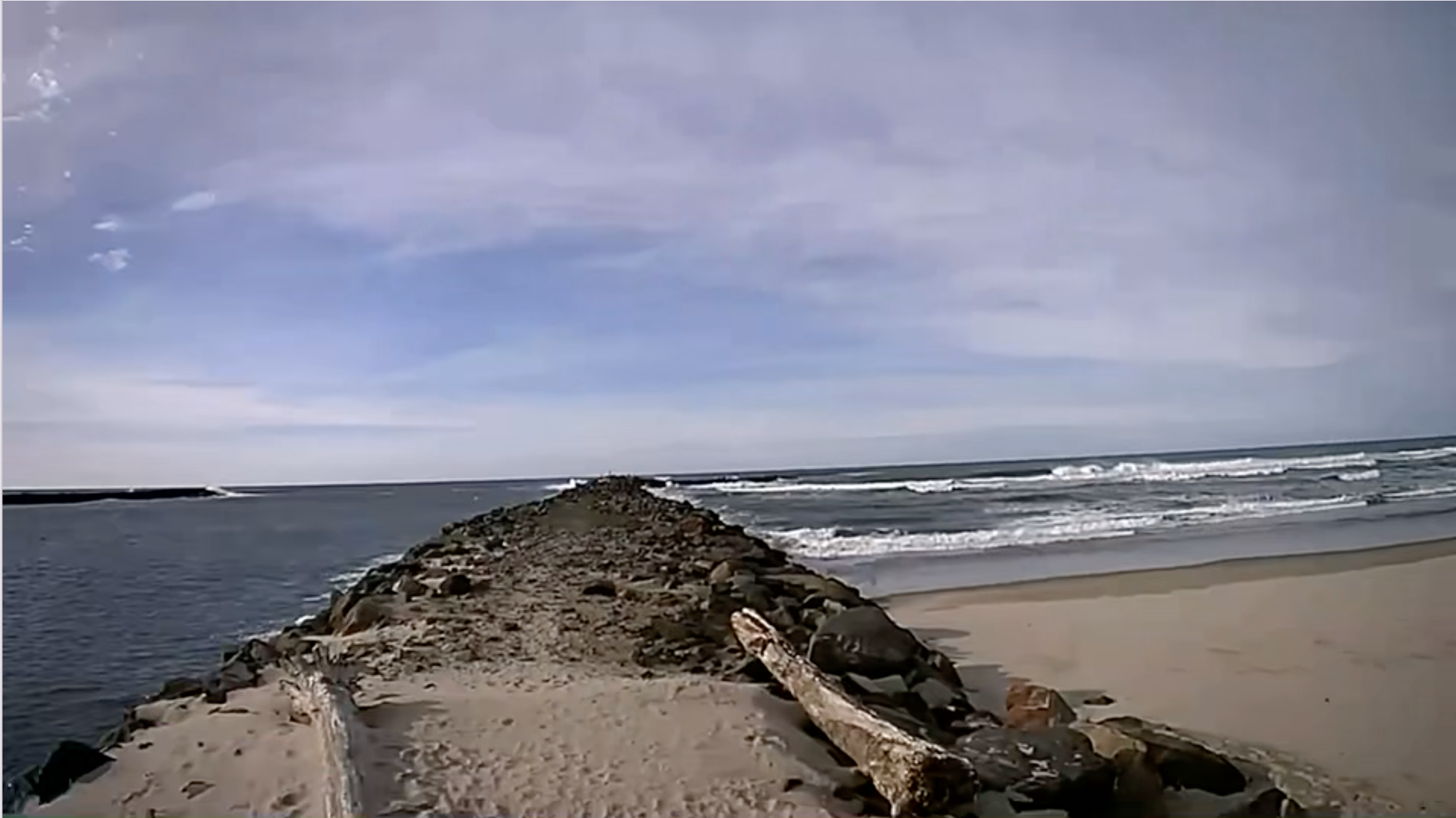
Siusla River, north jetty

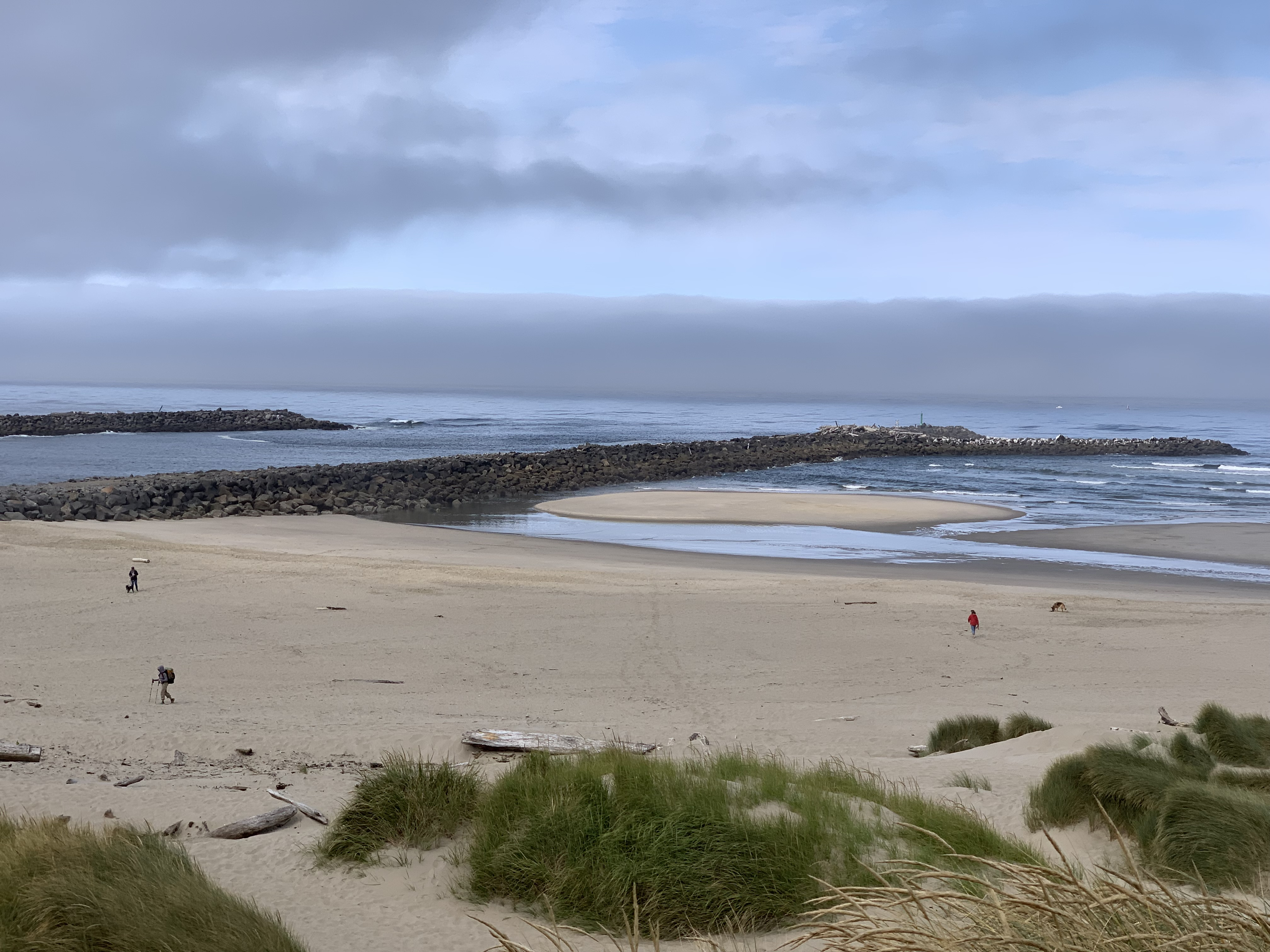
Siuslaw jetties at low tide, July 31, 2022.

The Siuslaw jetties (/saɪˈjuːslɔː/ sy-YOO-slaw) at Florence, Oregon, in the United States, are parallel rubble-mound structures at the entrance of the Siuslaw River, bounding the north and south banks and protecting the navigation channel. The jetties extend into the Pacific Ocean, with spur jetties designed to reduce breakers and shoaling across the sand bar.

The U.S. Army Corps of Engineers (USACE) completed the jetties in 1917, and completed reconstruction and lengthening projects in 1962. USACE lengthened the jetties again in 1985, and spur jetties were added at that time to reduce the need for annual dredging.

== Description ==
The Siuslaw River enters the Pacific Ocean about 250 km (155 miles) south of the Columbia River. The jetties and spurs at the entrance are randomly-placed rubble-mound structures of armor stone weighing from 10,885-to 17,235-kg (12- to 19-tons). The jetties border the river channel on the north and south, and were built originally between 1910 and 1917, with the north jetty originally 2,957 m (9,700 ft) long, and the south jetty 1,980 m (6,500 ft) in length.

A 1963 study described the jetty and channel system:

The principal harbor works at the mouth of the river consist of: (a) two quarrystone jetties 750 ft apart at their offshore extremities, the north jetty extending 3700 ft in a westerly direction along the edge of the north spit, and a south jetty extending 4300 ft in a westerly direction across the south spit; (b) an entrance channel 18 ft deep and 300 ft wide from deep water in the ocean to a point 1500 ft upstream from the seaward end of the existing north jetty; (c) a 5-mile-long channel 16 ft deep and 200 ft wide, with widening at the bends, extending from the entrance channel to Florence; (d) a turning basin 16 ft deep, 400 ft wide, and 600 ft long, opposite the Siuslaw docks at Florence; and (e) a channel 12 ft deep and 150 ft wide extending about 3 miles upstream from the turning basin... A reconstruction project is proposed for the south jetty which involves rebuilding the head and about 2250 ft of the trunk...

— U. S. Army Engineer Waterways Experiment Station, Corps of Engineers

By 1969, the north jetty had been rehabilitated and extended seaward 600 feet.

A later U.S. Army Corps of Engineers (USACE) inspection report said, "In 1985, the jetties at the mouth of the Siuslaw River were again extended seaward. The north jetty extension was 580 m (1,900 ft) long, and the south jetty extension was 670 m (2,200 ft)." Spurs were also added to the end of each jetty during the 1985 construction.

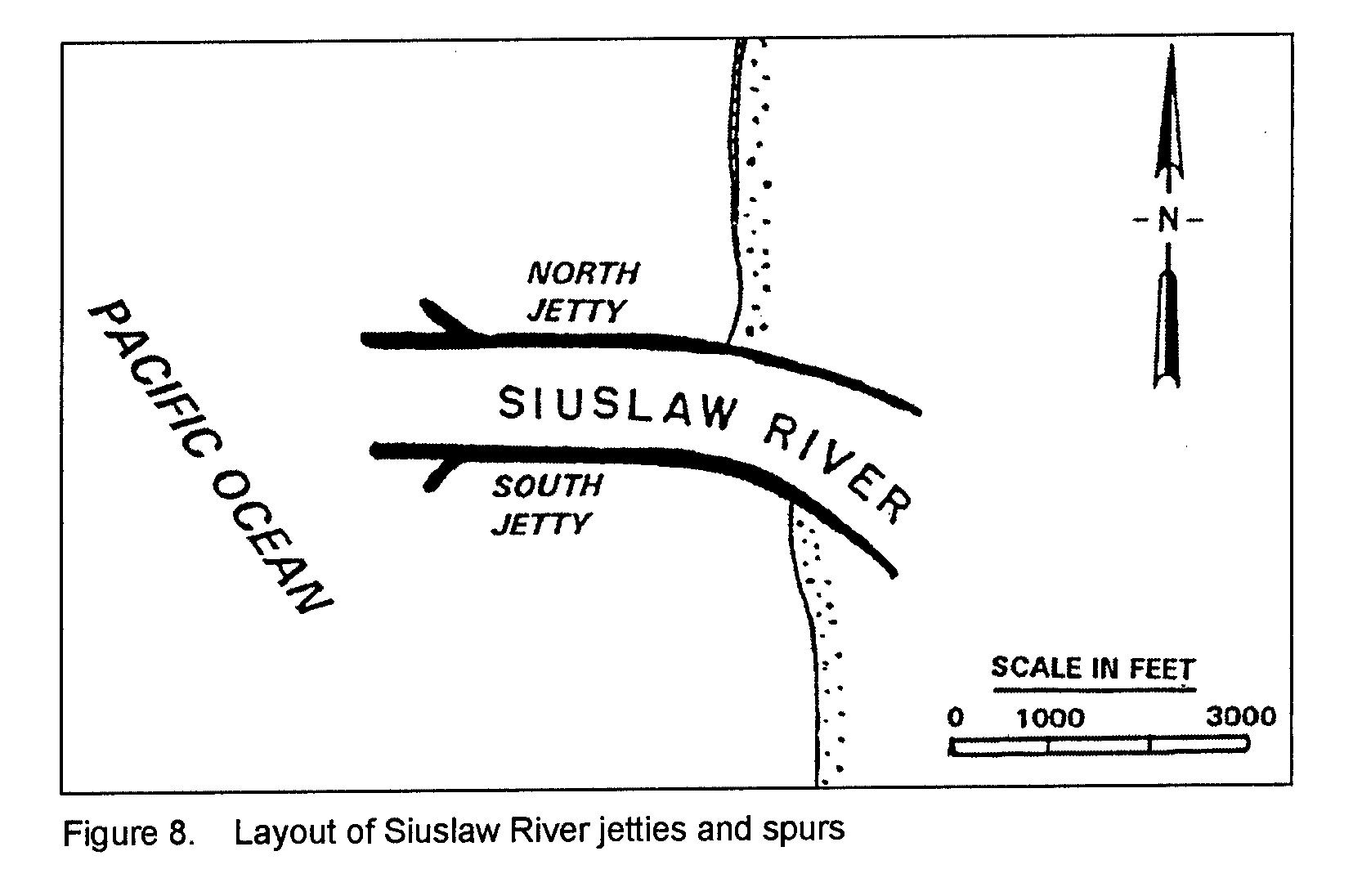
Diagram showing layout of Siuslaw jetties and spurs

The report described the 1985 construction of spurs:

...on the ocean sides of each jetty, 122-m-long (400-ft-long) spurs oriented 45 degrees to the main structure were constructed. The spurs originated 275 m (900 ft) shoreward of the jetty heads. The jetty heads were located in depths of about -7 m (-23 ft) mllw. (Note: Mean Lower Low Water (mllw) is the lowest of the two low tides per day (or the one low tide) averaged over a 19-year period called the National Tidal Datum Epoch.)

== History ==
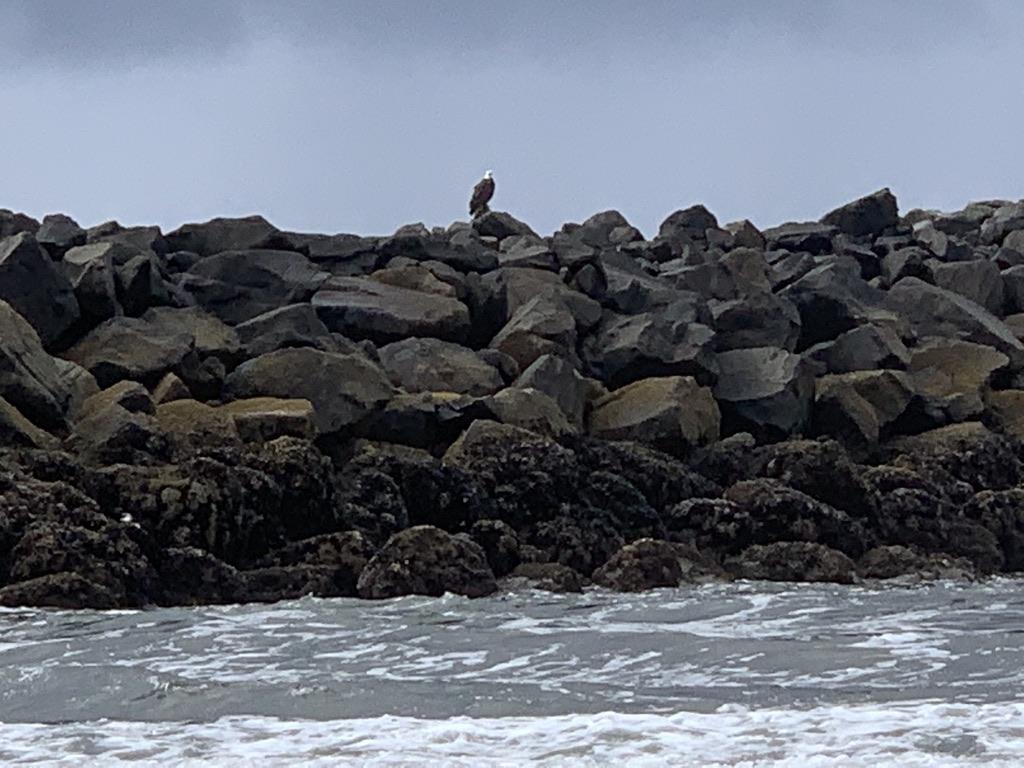
Bald eagle on north jetty

Prior to 1880, the Siuslaw River Valley was inhabited by the Siuslaw people, who used the river for transportation upstream by canoe for salmon runs or to reach hunting areas. The Coast Indian Reservation, including some Siuslaw lands, had been established in 1855, but from 1860 to 1875 the Siuslaw population declined from 129 to 45. Under the 1887 Dawes Act, land allotments were given in trust to the Siuslaws, but few were able to pay the property taxes. The decline in Siuslaw presence in the watershed brought the start of white settlement, and the expectation the river would be used by larger commercial craft to transport resources and goods.

=== 1879 to 1910 ===
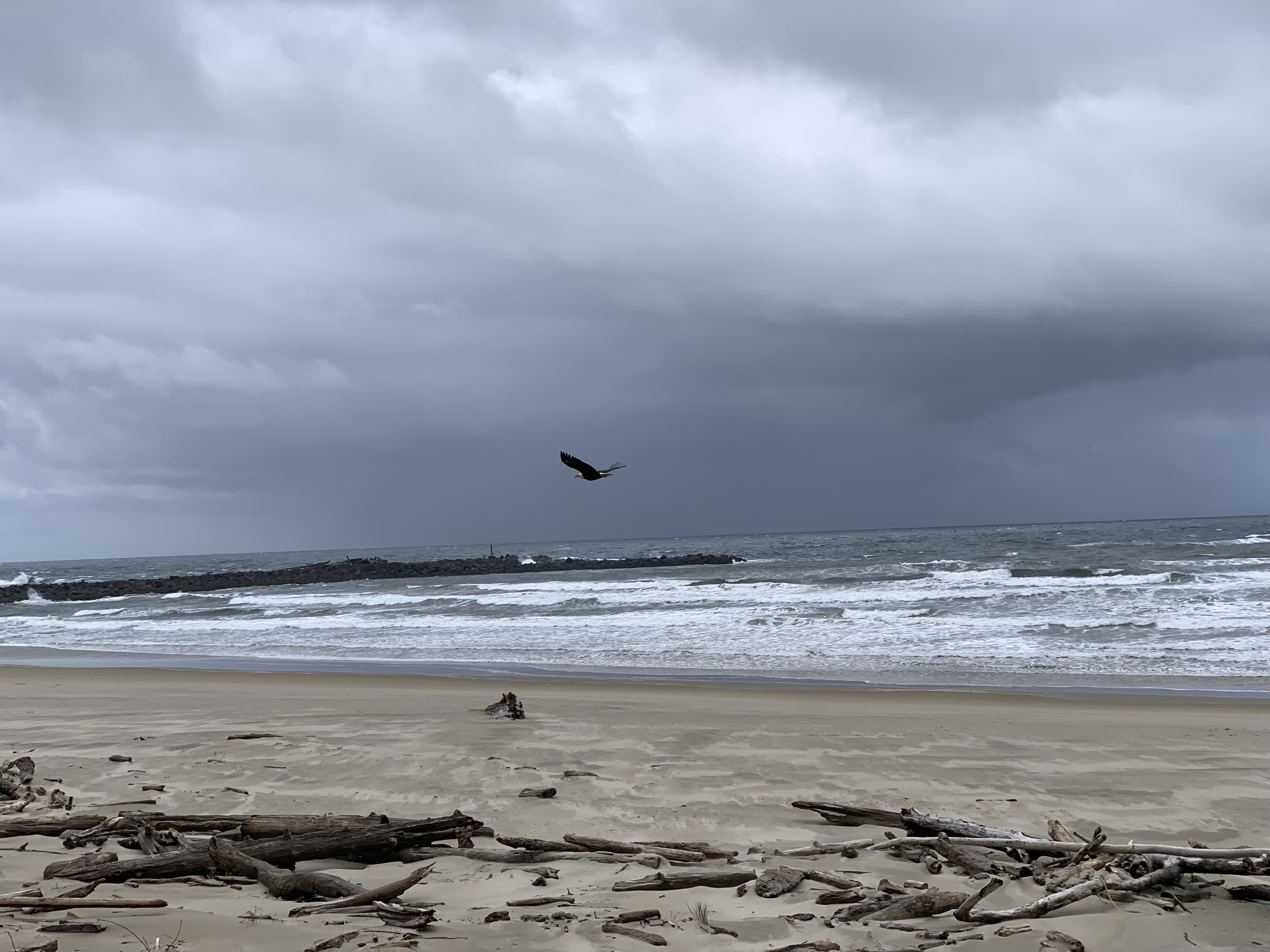
Bald eagle in flight over north jetty of Siuslaw River

The United States General Land Office Survey in 1879 (Florence area) rated the quality of the land along the coast as above average, and evaluated the resources available. Under the "Act to Improve Rivers and Harbors" of June 14, 1880, the USACE furnished reports on navigability of U.S. rivers. The 1880 report described Florence as "the name of the postoffice on the Siuslaw — a small settlement of five houses and about a dozen inhabitants". It said, "The river enters the ocean in a westerly direction, through an entrance 600 feet wide and 24 feet depth at low-water, between sandy shores. It has no headland on either side, and shifts from year to year north or south. Two years ago the mouth of the river was at least 1 mile north of its present position." It also reported one channel across the bar which was about a quarter mile from the entrance, with reported depth of "8 feet at low water". The report concluded, "The people living on the river... think that no improvement is required; all they ask is that an accurate survey be made and the depth on the bar be officially declared. When this is done and the entrance buoyed, it is thought small steamers and schooners can be induced to run into the river, and reasonable insurance can be obtained on their cargoes."

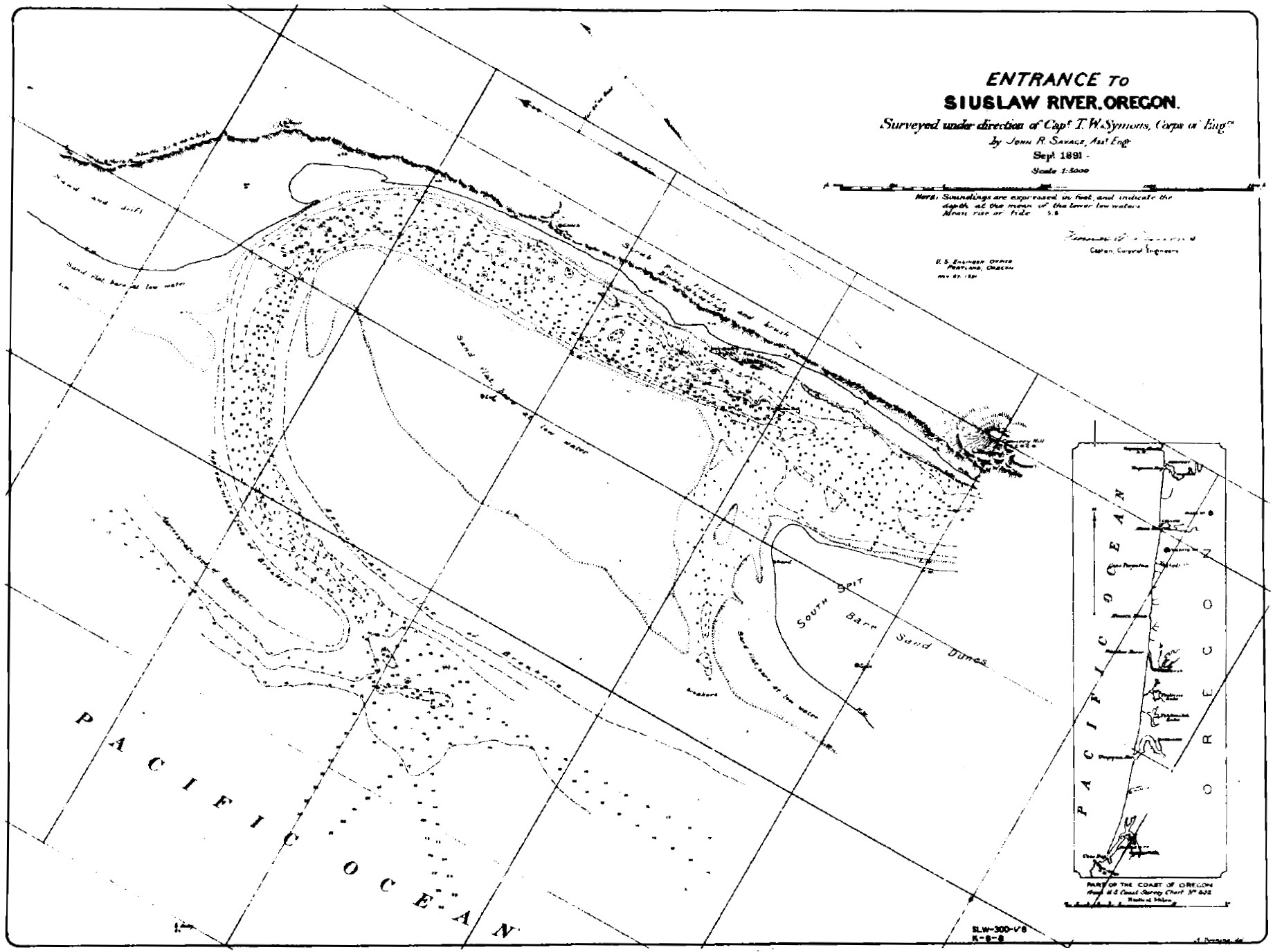
1891 Entrance survey of Siuslaw River showing multiple channels

The second survey, in 1887, reported a Florence population of about 250, and said,

The people claim that if the entrance were surveyed, buoyed, so as to furnish an outlet for the products of the country, that capital would come in to develop it, and reasonable rates of insurance could be had on cargoes. They would expect only the class of vessels that visit other coast harbors, with a draught of 12 feet, and think that these vessels could be induced to visit the river if the entrance were surveyed and buoyed, and if a jetty were built to hold the channel in one position.

In 1891, the USACE began work on the Siuslaw north jetty. By 1892, ships were crossing the bar to carry freight in and out of the harbor at Florence, Oregon. A local newspaper reported that the steamer Chance was carrying a load of railroad iron down the Siuslaw, "probably for the U.S. government to be used in the Siuslaw jetty work." At that time, there were two channels crossing the bar at the mouth of the river, with the south channel the deeper at 12 feet.

The USACE began constructing a tramway in late 1892, spending approximately $70,000 in the first two years to transport rock that had been brought down river by barge from a quarry in Mapleton. In 1894, Daniel Kern of Portland was contracted to build 1000 feet of jetty for $11,250.50 According to The World, "The fight to gain funds went on and although the jetties were unfinished and the bar crossing perilous, large boats still crossed the bar. During this period several boats were swamped on the bar or beached near the entrance." Rep. Binger Hermann secured funds in 1896 for "continuation of the work on the Siuslaw harbor".

By 1900, the jetties were still under construction, slowed by inadequate funding and the inherent difficulties of building underwater with active river and ocean currents. $20,000 had been spent in 1894, followed by $27,000 in 1896. The construction process involved setting pilings for the railway to support the tram, which was used to transport rock to the site of the jetty. A contractor commented to a reporter in 1900, while giving a tour of the building site via the tram, "...here is our trouble in a nutshell: we are dumping this rock into fifty feet of water; you can fancy how long it takes this filling to appear above the surface, and in the meantime the tide or rough water plays havoc with our piling. A few weeks ago we lost $1000 in timber and iron in a single night."

As of about 1903, pending acquisition of additional funding, jetty work was abandoned, with approximately 3,000 feet of the north jetty completed.

In 1909 I. B. Cushman of Cushman, Oregon, helped form the Port Commission and gained congressional approval of their bylaws. When the 1910 Rivers and Harbors Act required local interests to pay half the costs of federal construction projects, the Port Commission sold $324,000 in retirement bonds.

=== 1912 to 1929 ===
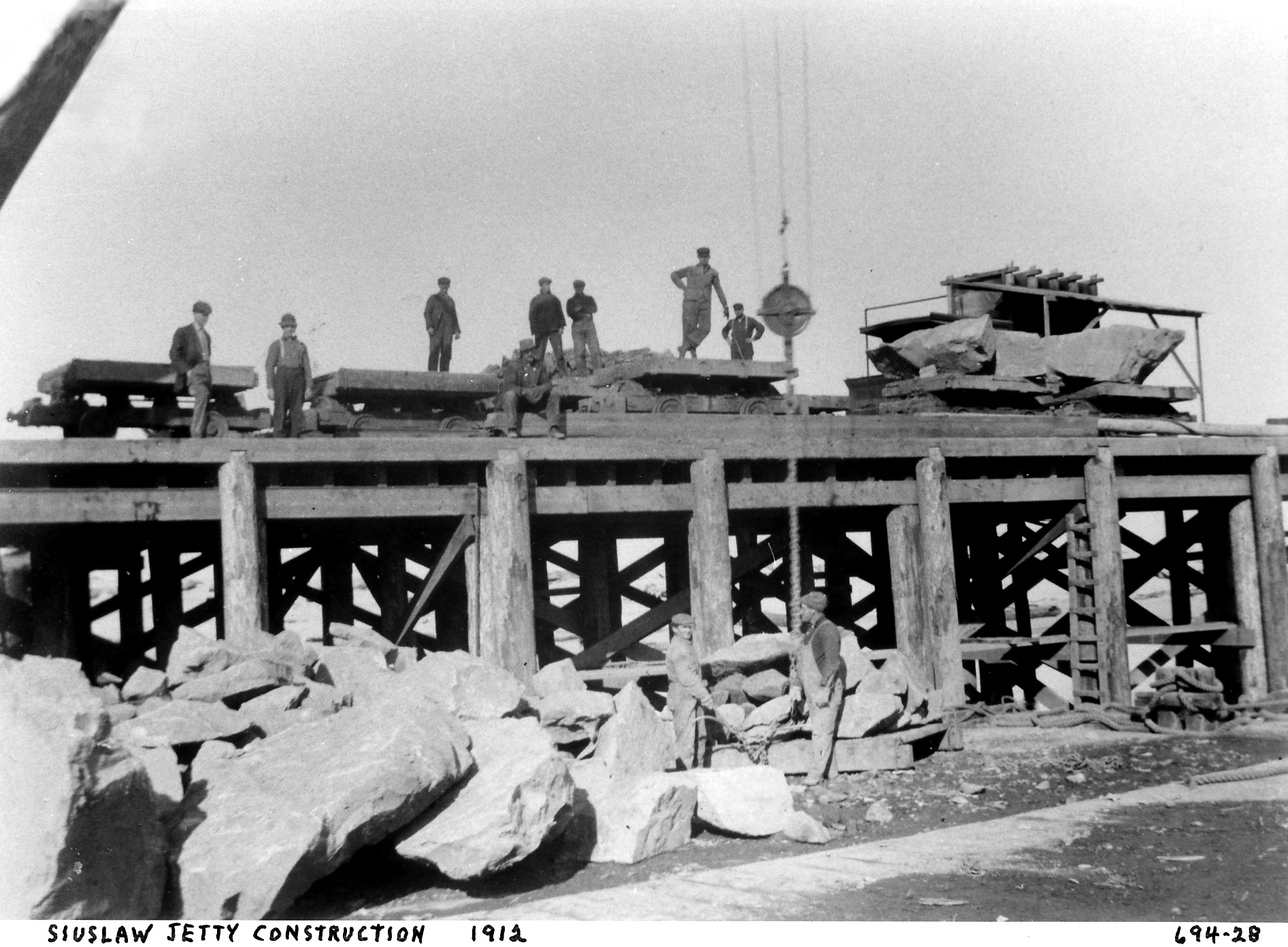
Siuslaw jetty construction, 1912.

By the beginning of 1912, a total of $100,000 had been spent constructing the south jetty and approximately 3,000 feet of the jetty on the north bank. However, the part of north jetty already built had deteriorated and needed to be rehabilitated. Assistant U.S. Engineer W.G.Carroll was appointed to take charge of the reconstruction and building an additional 3,000 feet of the north jetty, and also to supervise work on the south jetty to be completed by contractors Johnson, Anderson & Co. The federal government and the Port Commission of Siuslaw shared costs.

When the jetty work withstood a large storm in 1915, the Oregon Daily Journal said, "The fact that they stood up under the terrific pounding that they have been given for the past two weeks show that the work is of the most stable kind."

The jetties were completed in 1917, and further inner harbor improvements in 1929, at a total cost for the project of more than $1,00,000.

=== 1957 to 1969 ===
By 1957, Sen. Richard L. Neuberger and Rep. Charles O. Porter of Eugene supported a Florence jetty reconstruction project. After Lane County built up the Coast Guard Road next to the north jetty, rehabilitation and additional dredging projects in 1958 and 1962 added 600 feet to the north jetty, deepened the entrance channel to 18 feet and the channel to Florence to 16 feet, and widened and deepened a 12-foot channel from Florence to Mapleton. The Eugene Guard reported, "extension of the jetty will be about 100 feet less than originally planned", due to the expense of additional quarried rock at the end of the jetties, in deeper water than had been anticipated. These projects were completed in 1969.

=== 1982 to 1988 ===
Siuslaw River, NOAA Navigation Chart No. 18583

In December 1982, Congress approved $4 million to finance the first stage of a proposed $34-million extension of both jetties at the mouth of the Siuslaw River.

In 1983 the USACE contracted with Kiewit Pacific Company of Vancouver, Washington to lengthen the jetties "to keep sand from drifting into the estuary and clogging the port's boat channel". The $25 million project was to triple the length of the jetties, in an effort to eliminate 75 percent of the need for yearly dredging. Rock for the extensions was to be quarried near Mapleton.

Kiewit Pacific received a permit to use rock quarried on Siuslaw National Forest land near Mapleton, as well as use of the South Jetty Road in the Oregon Dunes National Recreation Area, as the access road for rock hauled to the south jetty. In use for a little more than a year, the quarry was closed in February 1985. In 1985, the project was completed, lengthening the jetties and adding the spurs.

== Studies ==
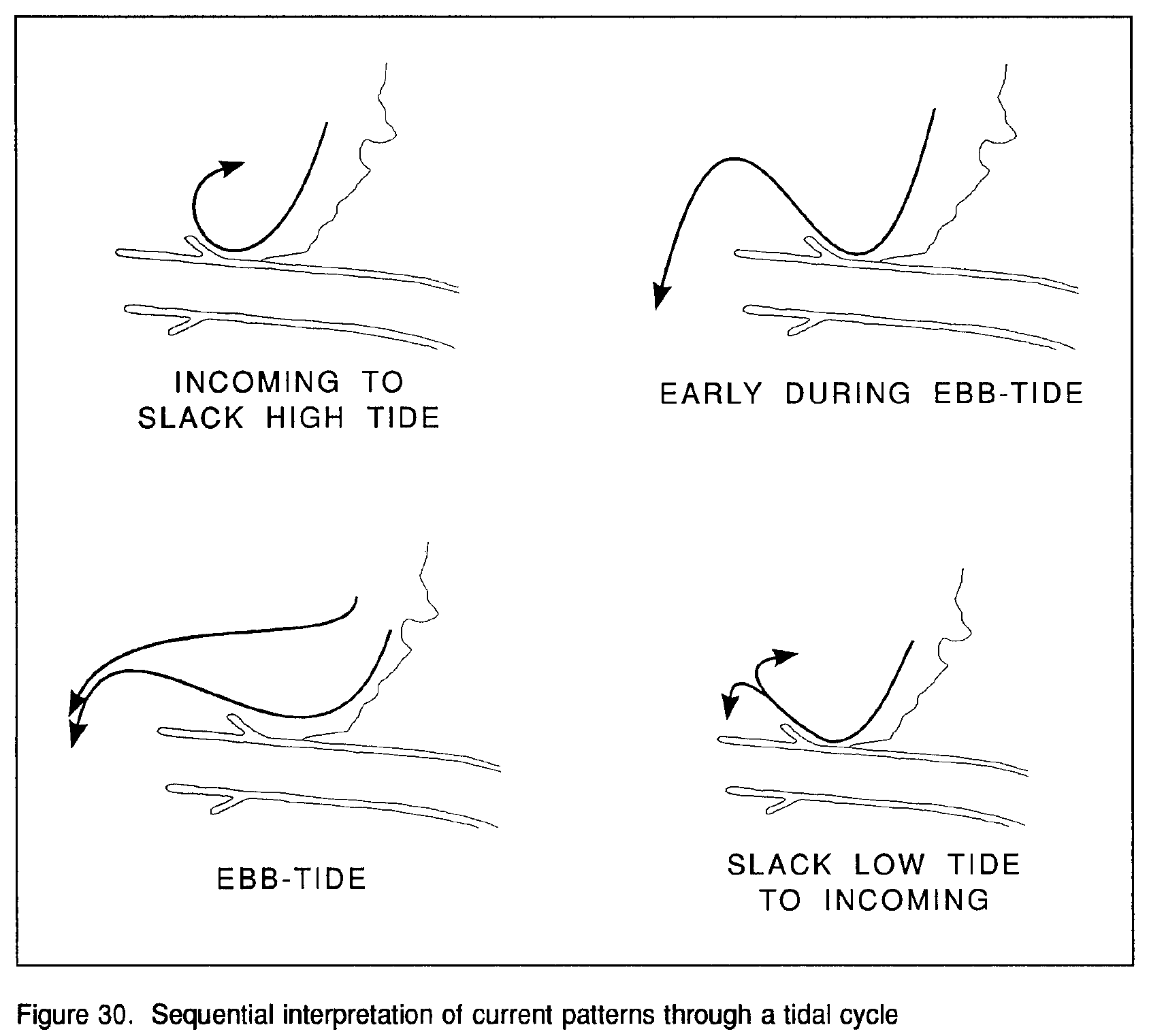
1995 current patterns around spur jetties on Siuslaw River

Following the 1962 reconstruction and extension of the north jetty, the USACE developed a scale model to investigate design criteria for rehabilitation of the south jetty. According to the report, "Three designs for the trunk section and two for the head section were tested under various stillwater depths for both high and low tide, and for a range of wave heights and periods with the waves attacking the jetty sections at angles of 90 and 0 deg." The report made specific design recommendations on the number of layers, shapes of armor stones, and placement of the rock to repair and construct different areas of the jetty's trunk and head section.

The question of how the jetties affect sand drift and beach erosion was studied in 1975. J.R. Lizarraga Arciniega found "a seasonal reversal in the sand drift, but with a zero or near zero net drift over a several years time span".

Lizarraga Arciniega described the drift:

In general, accretion of the shoreline took place adjacent to the jetties following their construction, both to the north and south. This accretion resulted mainly from the embayment formed between the jetty and the pre-jetty shoreline, the embayment becoming filled until the shoreline is straight and again in equilibrium with the waves such that there is a zero net sand drift.

Siuslaw River North Jetty survey mark, U.S. Army Corps of Engineers, 1988

Between 1981 and 1991 the Coastal Engineering Research Center of the USACE conducted studies on "the impact of the jetty design on the entire area, including sediment shoaling in the channel and beach erosion or build-up". The World of Coos Bay described the study:

The work is part of an ongoing process of monitoring the effectiveness of the unique Siuslaw jetty design. The jetties have unusual spurs which angle off from the main jetty near its outer end. These spurs are designed to trap sand and sediment moving along the shoreline, to keep it from entering the navigation channel and thus reduce the need for dredging... Beach profiles and dye studies have been used twice a year since 1981 to monitor the jetty area.

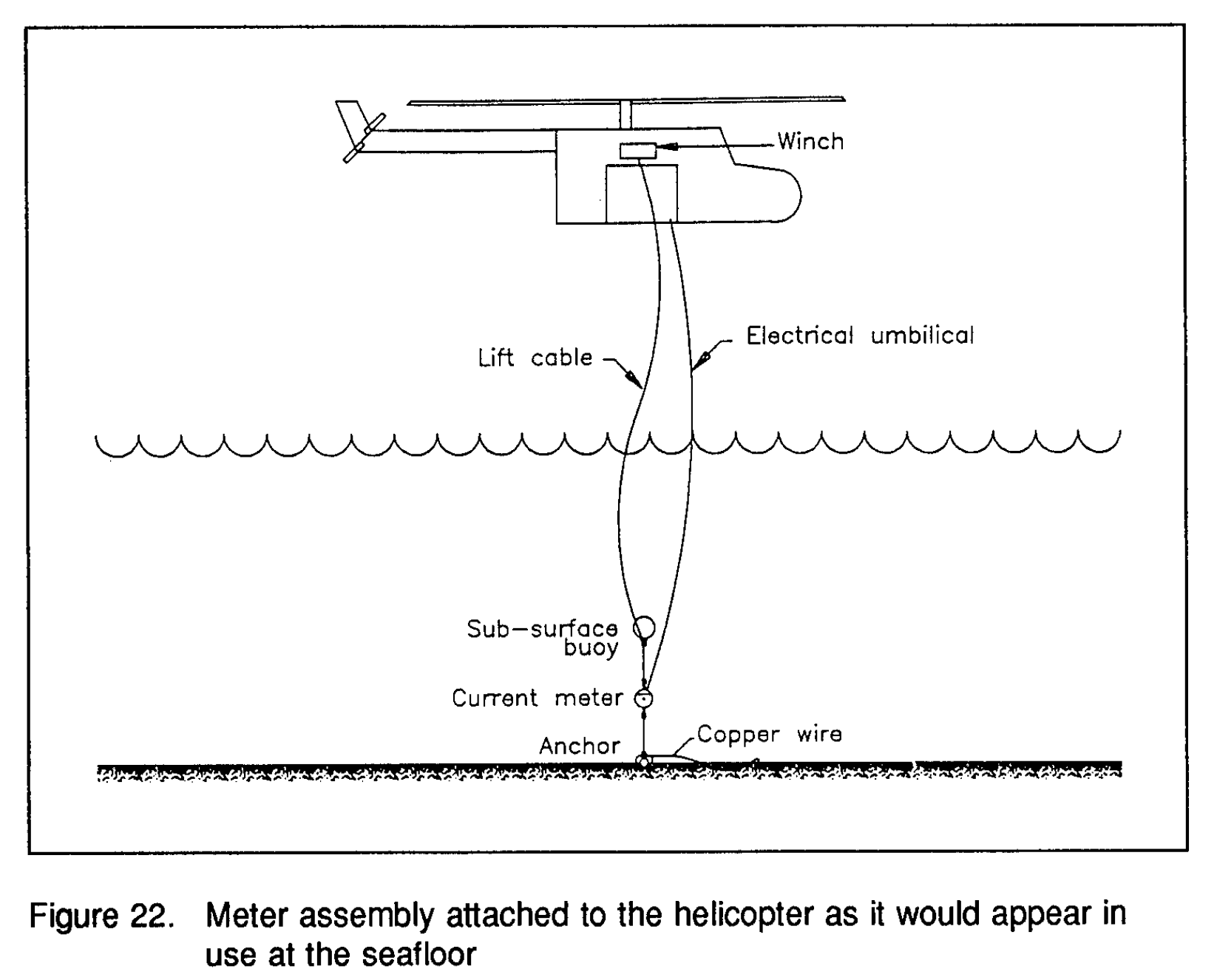
Diagram of 1995 data collection system

The USACE's 1995 study of the effectiveness of the spur jetties collected bathymetric data on currents around the jetties using "helicopter-borne near-shore survey system". The study concluded, "...the 1985 jetty improvements are a success... Navigability has been improved, construction cost of the spur system was estimated to be approximately $5 million less than the original design cost estimate for jetty extension... and annual maintenance dredging requirements have been reduced to approximately 100,000 cu yd".

== See also ==
- Breakwater (structure)
- Causeway
- Coastal engineering
- Groyne
- Mole (architecture)
