= Heceta Beach, Oregon =

Unincorporated community in the state of Oregon, United States

- Unincorporated community
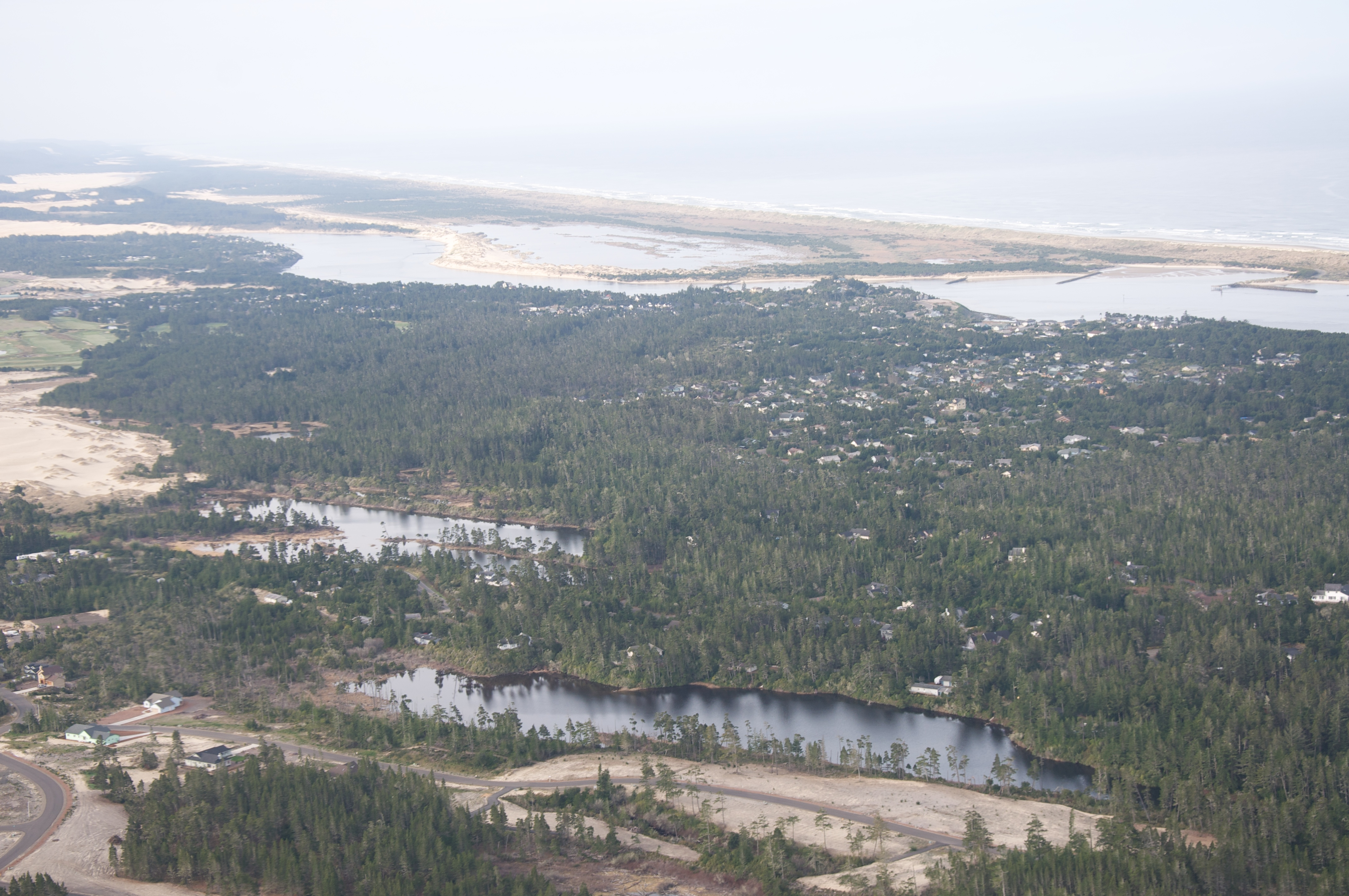
- Aerial view of Heceta Beach and surroundings

- Location within Oregon Location within the United States
- Coordinates: 44°01′25″N 124°07′52″W
- Country: United States
- State: Oregon
- County: Lane

Area
  - Total: 2.83 sq mi (7.33 km^{2})
  - Land: 2.34 sq mi (6.06 km^{2})
  - Water: 0.49 sq mi (1.27 km^{2})
- Elevation: 13 ft (4.0 m)

Population (2020)
  - Total: 1,912
  - Density: 817.5/sq mi (315.64/km^{2})
- Time zone: UTC-8 (Pacific (PST))
  - Summer (DST): UTC-7 (PDT)
- ZIP code: 97439
- Area codes: 458 and 541
- FIPS code: 41-33150
- GNIS feature ID: 2813314

Heceta Beach is an unincorporated community and census-designated place (CDP) in Lane County, Oregon, United States, located west of U.S. Route 101 next to the Pacific Ocean. As of the 2020 census, Heceta Beach had a population of 1,912. It is the next settlement north of the Siuslaw River and Florence and is within the Florence urban growth boundary. Heceta Beach was platted in 1915. Lane County maintains a small county park there, with beach access, as well as restrooms and picnic tables.

Driftwood Shores, a hotel and conference center in Heceta Beach, was annexed to Florence in 2008.

== Demographics ==
Historical population
Census	Pop.	Note	%±
2020	1,912		—
U.S. Decennial Census

== See also ==
- Heceta Head
