= Driftwood Beach State Recreation Site =

State park in Oregon, United States

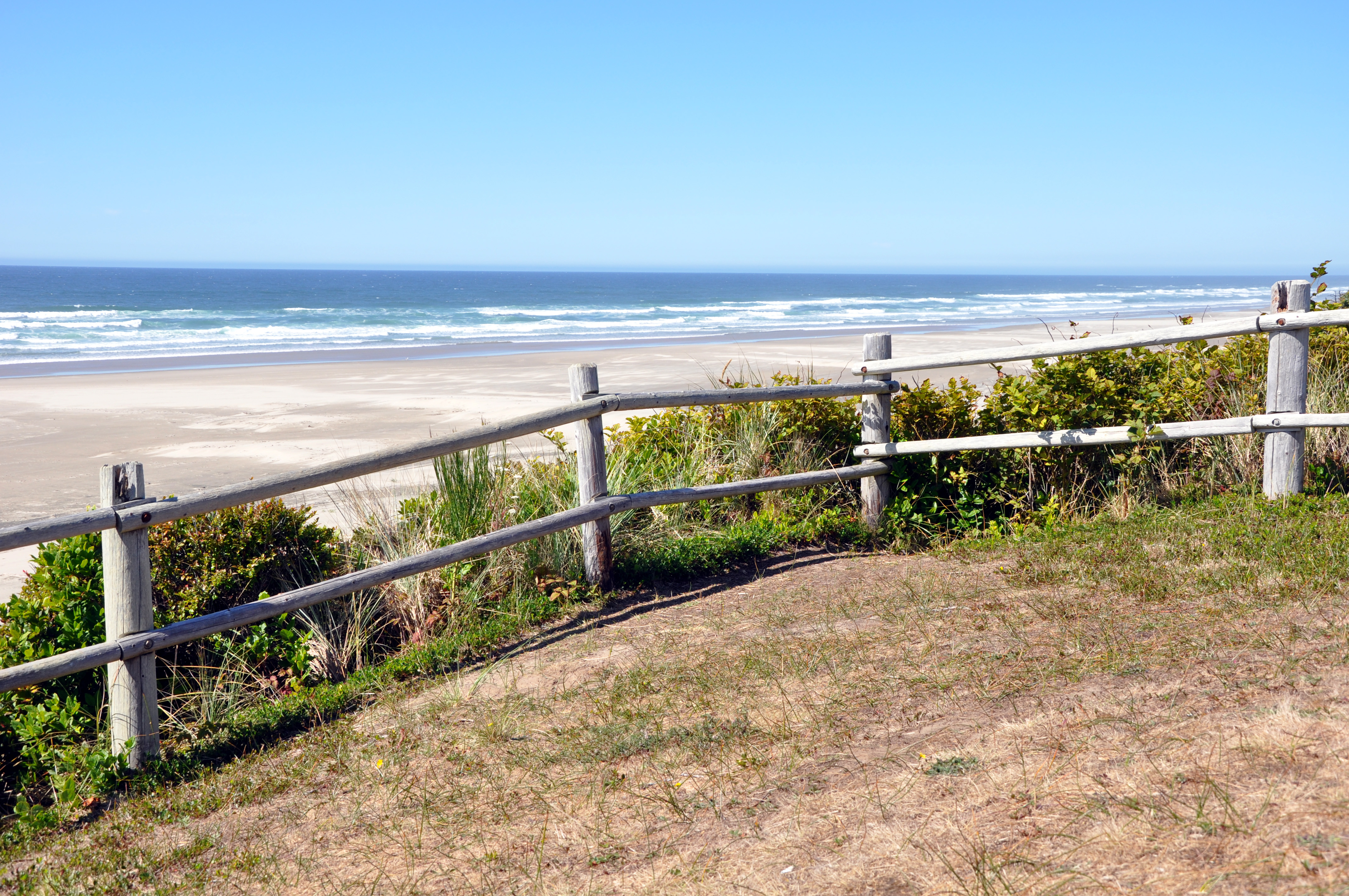
- Beach and Pacific Ocean from the park

- Location within Oregon Location within the United States
- Type: Public, state
- Location: Lincoln County, Oregon
- Nearest city: Waldport
- Coordinates: 44°27′49″N 124°04′44″W
- Area: 36.7 acres (14.9 ha)
- Operator: Oregon Parks and Recreation Department

Driftwood Beach State Recreation Site is a state park administered by the Oregon Parks and Recreation Department in the U.S. state of Oregon. Located 3 miles (5 km) north of Waldport along the Pacific Ocean, the park offers beach access, picnicking, and fishing in a setting of shore pines and sand. It is fee-free and open year-round.

The Oregon Parks and Recreation Department acquired 7.70 beachfront acres in 1968, and in 1986, L. Presley Gill gifted 29 additional acres. The 36.7-acre (14.9 ha) park between U.S. Highway 101 and the ocean has parking spaces from which visitors can watch winter-storm surf without leaving their cars. A path leads from the bluff to a wide beach with driftwood along the high-tide line. Kite flyers and beachcombers frequent the beach in sunny weather. The Oregon Coast Trail for long-distance hikers passes through the park.

It was used as a filming location for the upcoming 2023 film adaptation of the stage musical version of The Color Purple.

== See also ==
- List of Oregon state parks
