= Florence, Oregon =

- City
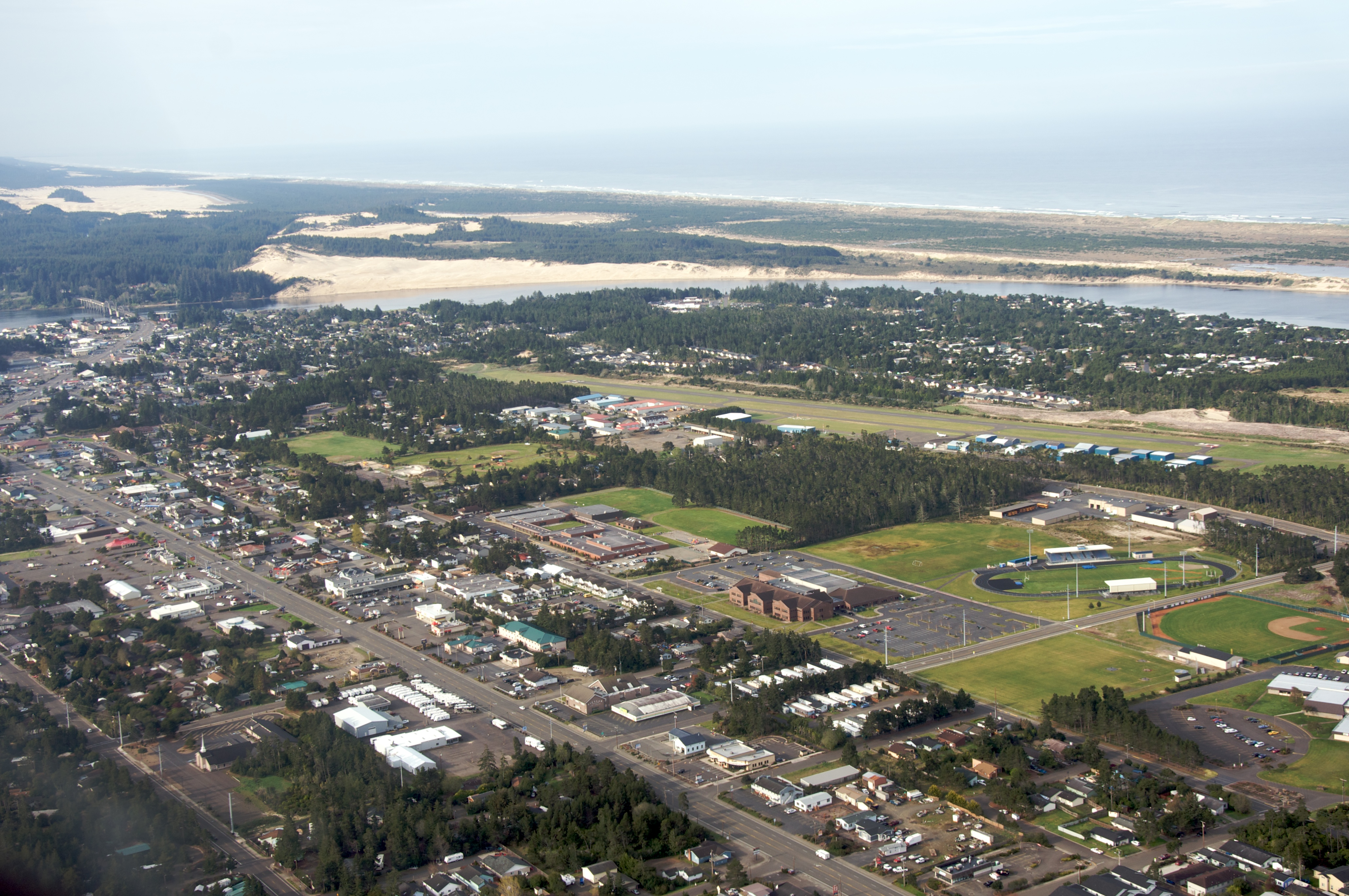
- Aerial view of Florence

- Location in Oregon
- Coordinates: 43°59′31″N 124°06′50″W
- Country: United States
- State: Oregon
- County: Lane
- Incorporated: 1893

Government
  - Mayor: Rob Ward

Area
  - Total: 6.22 sq mi (16.11 km^{2})
  - Land: 5.53 sq mi (14.33 km^{2})
  - Water: 0.69 sq mi (1.78 km^{2})
- Elevation: 66 ft (20 m)

Population (2020)
  - Total: 9,396
  - Density: 1,698.2/sq mi (655.68/km^{2})
- Time zone: UTC−8 (Pacific)
  - Summer (DST): UTC−7 (Pacific)
- ZIP Code: 97439
- Area codes: 458 and 541
- FIPS code: 41-26050
- GNIS feature ID: 2410511
- Website: www.ci.florence.or.us

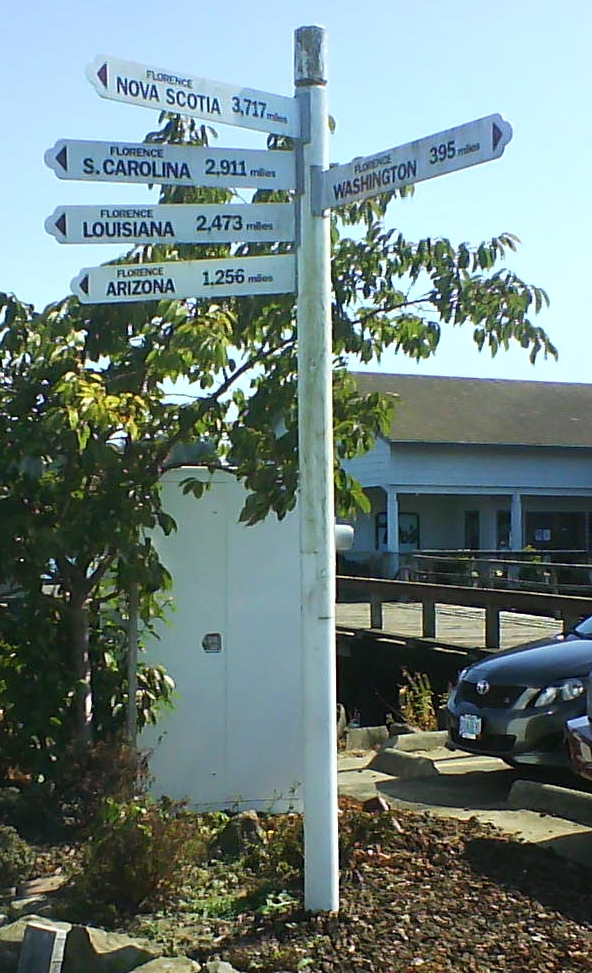
A sign in the Florence Old Town area denoting distances to other cities named "Florence" in North America

Florence is a coastal city in Lane County, in the U.S. state of Oregon. It lies at the mouth of the Siuslaw River on the Pacific Ocean and about midway between Newport to the north and Coos Bay to the south along U.S. Route 101. As of August 14, 2023, the city has a total population of 9,553.

== History ==
The Florence area was originally inhabited by the Siuslaw tribe of Native Americans. Some claim that the city was named after state senator A. B. Florence, who represented Lane County from 1858 to 1860; another claim is that Florence was named after a French vessel that was wrecked at the mouth of the Siuslaw River on February 17, 1875.

=== Exploding whale ===
On November 12, 1970, Florence was the site of a famous scene when the Oregon Department of Transportation used 20 cases of explosives to try to blow up a dead beached whale, with unintended consequences. The explosion was supposed to send pieces of whale flying towards the ocean, but many pieces were blown in the opposite direction, crushing a car over 0.25 miles (0.40 km) away and covering bystanders in small bits of whale. In 2020, residents voted to name a new park Exploding Whale Memorial Park.

=== Accidental ban on sex ===
The Florence City Council brought national attention to Florence after it approved a poorly-worded ordinance at its regular meeting on November 26, 1977. Intending to prevent people from having sexual intercourse in view of bystanders, the council approved a measure that made it illegal to have sex "while in or in view of a public or private place." Days later, a re-reading of the ordinance showed that it applied to sex in private. According to the United Press International report that followed days later, "City officials said they would not enforce the new ordinance until it could be amended."

== Geography ==
Florence is located on the Oregon Coast, at the mouth of the Siuslaw River, just north of Oregon Dunes National Recreation Area. It is situated at nearly the same latitude as Eugene, and is located roughly midway between the other main central-coast cities of Newport and Coos Bay. Florence annexed Driftwood Shores Hotel and Conference Center, north of town, in Heceta Beach, in 2008.

To the south of Florence, the unincorporated community of Glenada lies just across the Siuslaw River on U.S. Route 101; the city of Yachats is 23 miles (37 km) to the north.

According to the United States Census Bureau, the city has a total area of 5.87 square miles (15.20 km^{2}), of which 5.30 square miles (13.73 km^{2}) is land and 0.57 square miles (1.48 km^{2}) is water.

== Climate ==
Like most of Western Oregon, Florence has a Mediterranean climate (Köppen Csb) though cooler and wetter than usual for the type. The cooling effect of the Pacific makes summers as much as 9.4 °F or 5.2 °C cooler than Eugene by daily mean and 15.4 °F or 8.6 °C cooler by afternoon high. Outside of the short dry season in July and August, rainfall in Florence is generally frequent and heavy, totalling almost twice as much as in the Willamette Valley.

Climate data for Florence, Oregon, 1991–2020 normals, extremes 2006–2020
Month	Jan	Feb	Mar	Apr	May	Jun	Jul	Aug	Sep	Oct	Nov	Dec	Year
Record high °F (°C)	68 (20)	68 (20)	77 (25)	82 (28)	91 (33)	88 (31)	84 (29)	89 (32)	93 (34)	82 (28)	70 (21)	62 (17)	93 (34)
Mean daily maximum °F (°C)	49.1 (9.5)	51.1 (10.6)	52.9 (11.6)	55.5 (13.1)	60.1 (15.6)	63.5 (17.5)	67.9 (19.9)	67.4 (19.7)	66.3 (19.1)	60.7 (15.9)	53.4 (11.9)	47.5 (8.6)	58.0 (14.4)
Daily mean °F (°C)	43.9 (6.6)	44.1 (6.7)	45.7 (7.6)	47.7 (8.7)	51.8 (11.0)	54.9 (12.7)	58.7 (14.8)	58.3 (14.6)	56.4 (13.6)	52.3 (11.3)	46.9 (8.3)	42.5 (5.8)	50.3 (10.1)
Mean daily minimum °F (°C)	38.7 (3.7)	37.2 (2.9)	38.5 (3.6)	39.8 (4.3)	43.5 (6.4)	46.4 (8.0)	49.5 (9.7)	49.3 (9.6)	46.5 (8.1)	44.0 (6.7)	40.3 (4.6)	37.4 (3.0)	42.6 (5.9)
Record low °F (°C)	22 (−6)	22 (−6)	12 (−11)	27 (−3)	29 (−2)	35 (2)	37 (3)	39 (4)	34 (1)	27 (−3)	23 (−5)	17 (−8)	12 (−11)
Average precipitation inches (mm)	10.22 (260)	9.35 (237)	9.33 (237)	6.36 (162)	3.87 (98)	2.85 (72)	0.51 (13)	1.07 (27)	2.26 (57)	5.95 (151)	11.25 (286)	12.50 (318)	75.52 (1,918)
Average snowfall inches (cm)	0.3 (0.76)	0.1 (0.25)	0.0 (0.0)	0.1 (0.25)	0.0 (0.0)	0.0 (0.0)	0.0 (0.0)	0.0 (0.0)	0.0 (0.0)	0.0 (0.0)	0.1 (0.25)	0.0 (0.0)	0.6 (1.51)
Average precipitation days (≥ 0.01 in)	20.1	20.4	21.5	18.7	13.0	10.4	3.8	6.0	9.0	15.3	19.9	21.3	179.4
Average snowy days (≥ 0.1 in)	0.5	0.3	0.0	0.1	0.0	0.0	0.0	0.0	0.0	0.0	0.1	0.2	1.2
Source 1: NOAA
Source 2: National Weather Service

== Demographics ==
Historical population
Census	Pop.	Note	%±
1880	68		—
1900	222		—
1910	311		40.1%
1920	317		1.9%
1930	339		6.9%
1940	458		35.1%
1950	1,026		124.0%
1960	1,642		60.0%
1970	2,246		36.8%
1980	4,411		96.4%
1990	5,162		17.0%
2000	7,263		40.7%
2010	8,466		16.6%
2020	9,396		11.0%
U.S. Decennial Census

=== 2020 census ===
As of the 2020 census, Florence had a population of 9,396. The median age was 61.8 years. 12.8% of residents were under the age of 18 and 44.0% of residents were 65 years of age or older. For every 100 females there were 87.4 males, and for every 100 females age 18 and over there were 84.7 males.

99.3% of residents lived in urban areas, while 0.7% lived in rural areas.

There were 4,623 households in Florence, of which 15.1% had children under the age of 18 living in them. Of all households, 42.0% were married-couple households, 17.0% were households with a male householder and no spouse or partner present, and 33.7% were households with a female householder and no spouse or partner present. About 36.9% of all households were made up of individuals and 25.5% had someone living alone who was 65 years of age or older.

There were 5,310 housing units, of which 12.9% were vacant. Among occupied housing units, 65.5% were owner-occupied and 34.5% were renter-occupied. The homeowner vacancy rate was 2.0% and the rental vacancy rate was 5.3%.

Racial composition as of the 2020 census
Race	Number	Percent
White	8,239	87.7%
Black or African American	40	0.4%
American Indian and Alaska Native	109	1.2%
Asian	127	1.4%
Native Hawaiian and Other Pacific Islander	17	0.2%
Some other race	185	2.0%
Two or more races	679	7.2%
Hispanic or Latino (of any race)	565	6.0%

=== 2010 census ===
As of the census of 2010, there were 8,466 people, 4,226 households, and 2,374 families living in the city. The population density was 1,597.4 inhabitants per square mile (616.8/km^{2}). There were 5,103 housing units at an average density of 962.8 per square mile (371.7/km^{2}). The racial makeup of the city was 92.5% White, 1.4% Pacific Islander, 1.3% Native American, 1.0% Asian, 0.3% African American, 0.3%, Pacific Islander, 1.4% from other races, and 3.2% from two or more races. Hispanic or Latino of any race were 5.4% of the population.

There were 4,226 households, of which 15.8% had children under the age of 18 living with them, 43.7% were married couples living together, 9.2% had a female householder with no husband present, 3.3% had a male householder with no wife present, and 43.8% were non-families. 37.0% of all households were made up of individuals, and 21.9% had someone living alone who was 65 years of age or older. The average household size was 1.98 and the average family size was 2.51.

The median age in the city was 57 years. 13.9% of residents were under the age of 18; 5.9% were between the ages of 18 and 24; 15.5% were from 25 to 44; 28.4% were from 45 to 64; and 36.4% were 65 years of age or older. The gender makeup of the city was 46.4% male and 53.6% female.

=== 2000 census ===
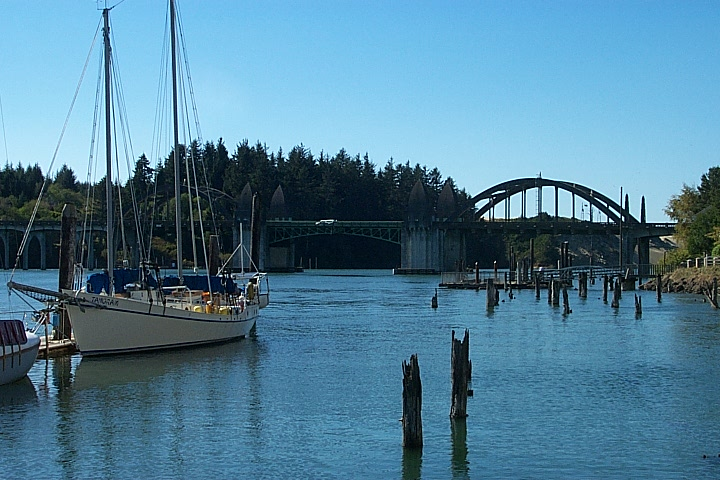
A sailboat on the Siuslaw River

Per the census of 2000, there were 7,263 people, 3,564 households, and 2,145 families living in the city. The population density was 1,476.3 people per square mile (570.0 people/km^{2}). There were 4,174 housing units at an average density of 848.4 per square mile (327.6/km^{2}). The racial makeup of the city was 95.88% White, 0.28% African American, 0.92% Native American, 0.55% Asian, 0.14% Pacific Islander, 0.56% from other races, and 1.67% from two or more races. 2.37% of the population were Hispanic or Latino of any race. There were 3,564 households, out of which 16.9% had children under the age of 18 living with them, 48.6% were married couples living together, 9.3% had a female householder with no husband present, and 39.8% were non-families. 34.4% of all households were made up of individuals, and 21.7% had someone living alone who was 65 years of age or older. The average household size was 2.02 and the average family size was 2.52.

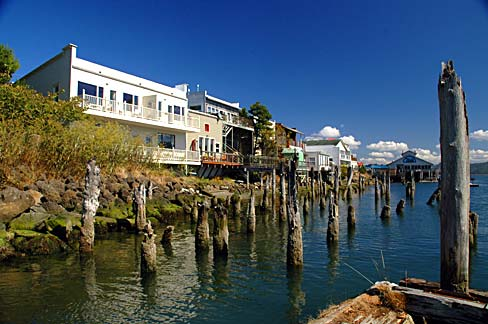
Florence Waterfront

In the city, the population dispersal was 16.8% under the age of 18, 5.0% from 18 to 24, 16.0% from 25 to 44, 23.9% from 45 to 64, and 38.2% who were 65 years of age or older. The median age was 56 years. For every 100 females, there were 84.8 males. For every 100 females age 18 and over, there were 82.1 males. The median income for a household in the city was $30,505, and the median income for a family was $36,784. Males had a median income of $30,962 versus $23,878 for females. The per capita income for the city was $18,008. 14.4% of the population and 10.0% of families were below the poverty line. 25.9% of those under the age of 18 and 8.3% of those 65 and older were living below the poverty line.

== Economy ==
The former mainstays of Florence's economy were logging, commercial fishing, and agriculture, but today tourism is increasingly significant. Some local businesses include Sand Master Park, Mo's Restaurants and Three Rivers Casino Resort, which is run by the Confederated Tribes of Coos, Lower Umpqua and Siuslaw Indians. The Port of Siuslaw promotes commercial fishing, shipping and tourism. About one-third of Florence's population consists of retirees.

== Arts and culture ==
=== Annual cultural events ===
Florence has held an annual Rhododendron festival, flower and garden show since 1908.

Florence has also hosted The Power of Florence, an annual volunteer event, since 2013. According to the group's Facebook page, the event is a "proclaimed city-wide day dedicated to volunteering and giving back".

=== Museums and other points of interest ===
The Siuslaw Pioneer Museum is located in a historic 1905 schoolhouse.

Old Town Florence is located on the Siuslaw riverfront. The Port of Siuslaw marina is to the east, and the Art Deco 1936 Siuslaw River Bridge is to the west. The boardwalk promenade was built along the marina to improve the area. Many businesses are on US101 itself, which runs through the town, north to south.

North of Florence on U.S. Route 101 are the Sea Lion Caves, a tourist attraction that features a sea cave that is the year-round home of a population of Steller sea lions.

=== Historic buildings ===
Historic buildings on the National Register of Historic Places in the Florence area include the Edwin E. Benedict House, a deteriorating house on the Siuslaw River that is said to have been Ken Kesey's inspiration for the Stamper House in his novel Sometimes a Great Notion, Heceta Head Lighthouse and Keepers Quarters, Jessie M. Honeyman Memorial State Park Historic District, the Siuslaw River Bridge, and the William Kyle and Sons Building in Old Town.

== Parks and recreation ==
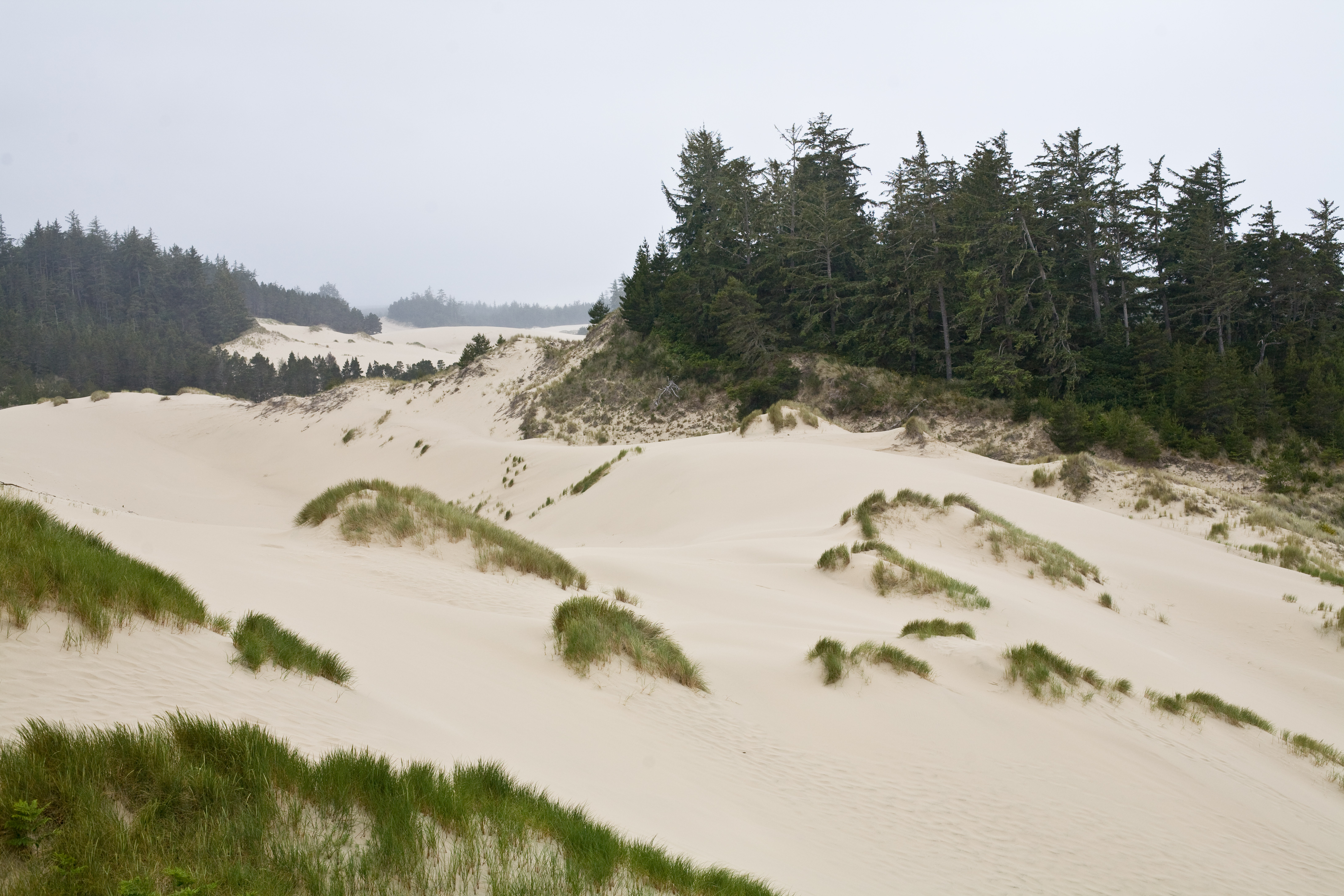
The Oregon Dunes National Recreation Area near Florence

There are several parks and other sites managed by the Oregon Parks and Recreation Department near Florence, including Darlingtonia State Natural Site and Heceta Head Lighthouse at Devil's Elbow to the north, and Jessie M. Honeyman Memorial State Park to the south. The Oregon Dunes National Recreation Area, managed as part of the Siuslaw National Forest, begins south of Florence.

== Education ==
Florence is served by the three-school Siuslaw School District, which includes Siuslaw Elementary School, Siuslaw Middle School, and Siuslaw High School. Lane Community College has a center in Florence.

== Media ==
- The Siuslaw News is a weekly newspaper published in Florence. The Register-Guard, published in Eugene, is also distributed in Florence.
- KXCR, 90.7 FM, is a 501(c)(3), non-profit, non-commercial, community radio station.
- Locally owned and operated radio stations KCST-FM and KCFM (AM) provide music, news, local and regional sports, and emergency public service programming 24 hours a day.
- Radio translator K211BP rebroadcasts KRVM-FM from Eugene.
- Non-profit organization West Lane Translator, Inc. maintains licenses and transmission facilities for five High Definition television translators, as well as 6 FM radio translators providing free over-the-air programming to the Florence area.

== Transportation ==
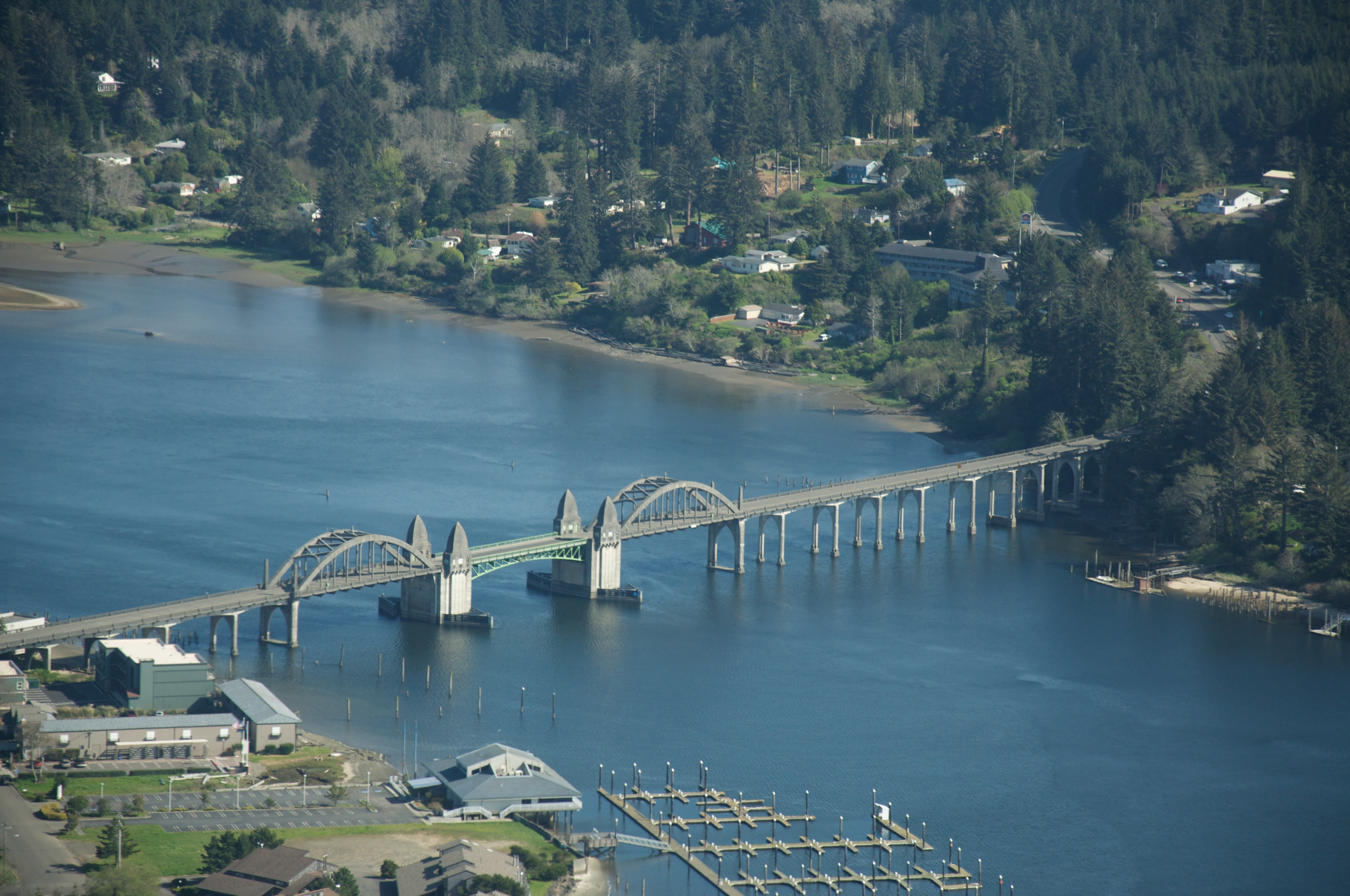
The Siuslaw River bridge in Florence

=== Highways ===
- U.S. Route 101
- Oregon Route 126

=== Air ===
- Florence Municipal Airport

== Healthcare ==
Peace Harbor Hospital serves western Lane County. It is also one of the area's largest employers.

== Sister city ==
Florence had one sister city:

- Yamagata, Japan: Yamagata-shi was established in 2003 by the merger of Ijira (Florence's former sister city), Takatomi, and Miyama.

== See also ==
- Kyllo v. United States, a Supreme Court case involving a Florence resident
