= Siuslaw River =

River in the United States of America

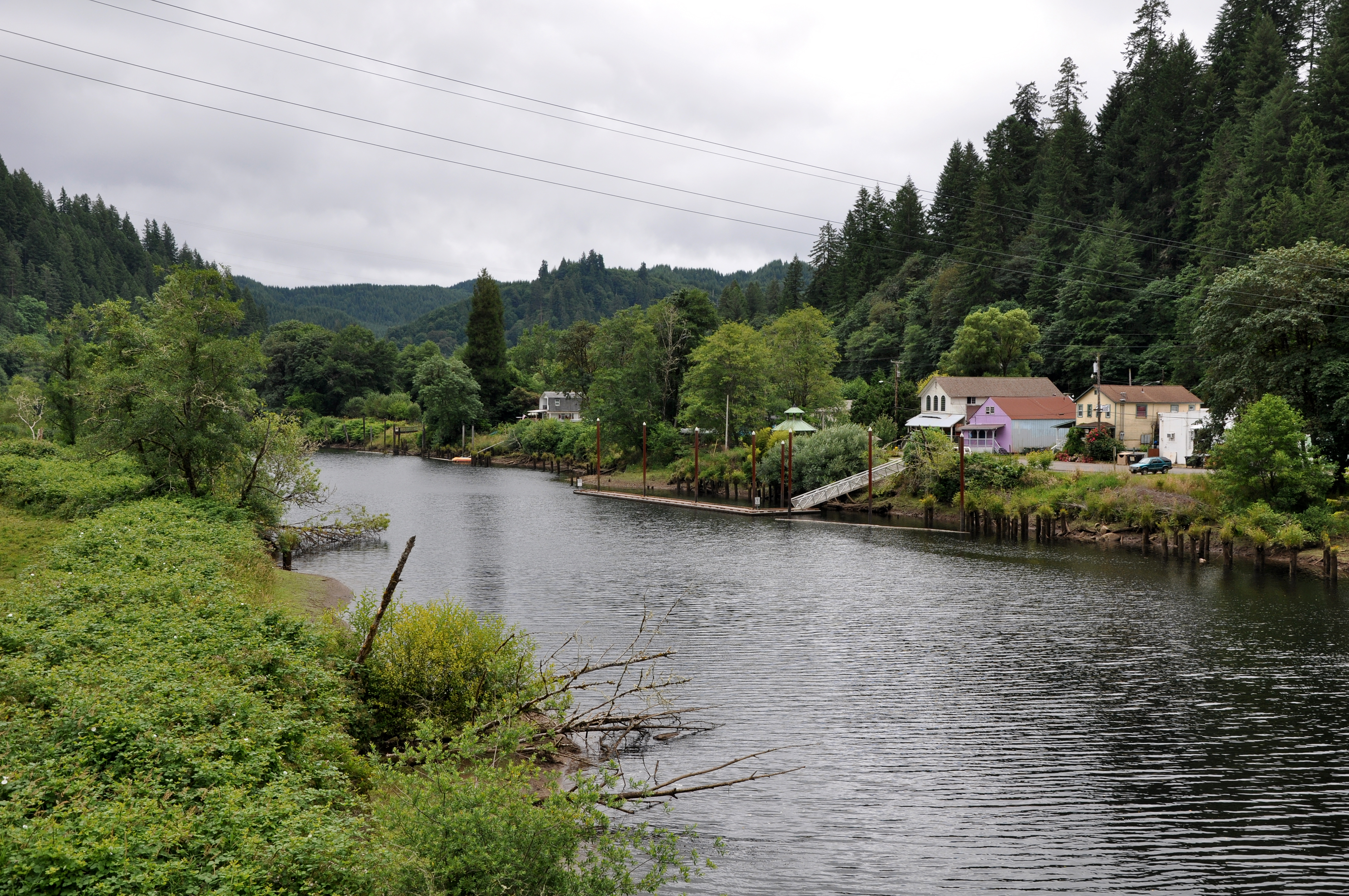
- Siuslaw River at Mapleton

- Location of the mouth of the Siuslaw River in Oregon
- Etymology: From a Yakonan name for a locality, tribe or chief

Location
- Country: United States
- State: Oregon
- County: Lane

Physical characteristics
- Source: Central Oregon Coast Range
  - location: about 10 miles (16 km) west of Cottage Grove
  - coordinates: 43°49′23″N 123°15′42″W
  - elevation: 636 ft (194 m)
- Mouth: Pacific Ocean
  - location: Florence
  - coordinates: 44°01′01″N 124°08′14″W
  - elevation: 0 ft (0 m)
- Length: 110 mi (177 km)
- Basin size: 773 sq mi (2,000 km^{2})
- Discharge
  - location: near Mapleton, 23.7 miles (38.1 km) from the mouth
  - average: 1,974 cu ft/s (55.9 m^{3}/s)
  - minimum: 45 cu ft/s (1.3 m^{3}/s)
  - maximum: 49,400 cu ft/s (1,400 m^{3}/s)

The Siuslaw River (/saɪˈjuːslɔː/ sy-YOO-slaw) is a river, about 110 miles (177 km) long, that flows to the Pacific Ocean coast of Oregon in the United States. It drains an area of about 773 square miles (2,000 km^{2}) in the Central Oregon Coast Range southwest of the Willamette Valley and north of the watershed of the Umpqua River.

It rises in the mountains of southwestern Lane County, about 10 miles (16 km) west of Cottage Grove. It flows generally west-northwest through the mountains, past Swisshome, entering the Pacific at Florence. The head of tide is 26 miles (42 km) upstream.

It is part of the homeland of the Siuslaw people, after whom it is named. Citizens of the Siuslaw nation lived in villages along the river until 1860 when they were forcibly removed to an Indian reservation in Yachats whereupon their homes, farms, gardens and villages were destroyed and occupied by U.S. settler-colonists.

The valley of the river has been one of the productive timber regions in Oregon. The lower course of the river passes through Siuslaw National Forest.

The Coos Bay branch of the Coos Bay Rail Link crosses many bridges as it follows the narrow, winding valley of the Siuslaw River to the swing bridge at Cushman.

The river has historically been a spawning ground for Chinook and coho salmon. Although the Chinook population is substantial, coho numbers have declined from an annual average of 209,000 fish between 1889 and 1896 to just over 3,000 fish between 1990 and 1995. The estuary of the river is surrounded by extensive wetlands that are a significant habitat for migratory birds along the coast. It is one of the very few Western Oregon rivers where all major forks are undammed. The river has a strong run of American shad.

== See also ==
- List of longest streams of Oregon
- List of rivers of Oregon
- North Fork Siuslaw River
- Siuslaw jetties
- Siuslaw River Bridge
