= Oregon Route 200 =

North-south state highway in Oregon, US

Oregon Route 200
- Territorial Highway

Route information
- Maintained by ODOT
- Length: 42.11 mi (67.77 km)
- Existed: 2002–present

Major junctions
- South end: Lane–Douglas county line
- North end: OR 99W in Monroe

Location
- Country: United States
- State: Oregon
- Counties: Benton, Lane

Highway system
- Oregon Highways; Interstate; US; State; Named; Scenic
← US 199	→ OR 201

Oregon Route 200 is an Oregon state highway running from OR 99W at Monroe to the Lane-Douglas County line near Anlauf. OR 200 is composed of most of the Territorial Highway No. 200 (see Oregon highways and routes). It is 40.64 miles (65.40 km) long, in two segments broken by a section of OR 36 and runs north–south.

OR 200 was established in 2002 as part of Oregon's project to assign route numbers to highways that previously were not assigned.

== Route description ==
OR 200 begins at an intersection with OR 99W in Monroe. It heads south through Bear Creek to an intersection with OR 36, at which point the Territorial Highway overlaps the Mapleton-Junction City Highway No. 229. The concurrency continues west for 1.48 miles (2.38 km) as OR 36, at which point OR 200 heads south through Elmira to Veneta. At Veneta, OR 200 crosses OR 126 and continues south through Crow and Lorane to the Lane-Douglas County line, where it ends. An old section of the Territorial Highway continues south as a Douglas County road to Anlauf, where it ends at an intersection with OR 99.

== History ==
The Territorial Highway is one of Oregon's oldest roads. It can be traced to at least 1851, and by 1947 was referred to in a judicial opinion as the "Old Territorial Highway".

OR 200 was assigned to the remaining part of the Territorial Highway, except that section which is part of OR 36, in 2002.

== Major intersections ==
County	Location	mi	km	Destinations	Notes
Lane–Douglas county line		42.11	67.77	End state maintenance	
Lane	Veneta	19.52	31.41	OR 126 – Eugene, Florence	
Lane		10.13	16.30	OR 36 west – Blachly, Triangle Lake	Southern end of OR 36 overlap
Lane	Cheshire	8.65	13.92	OR 36 east – Junction City, Eugene	Northern end of OR 36 overlap
Benton	Monroe	0.00	0.00	OR 99W – Junction City, Corvallis	
1.000 mi = 1.609 km; 1.000 km = 0.621 mi: Concurrency terminus
