= Lake Creek (Siuslaw River tributary) =

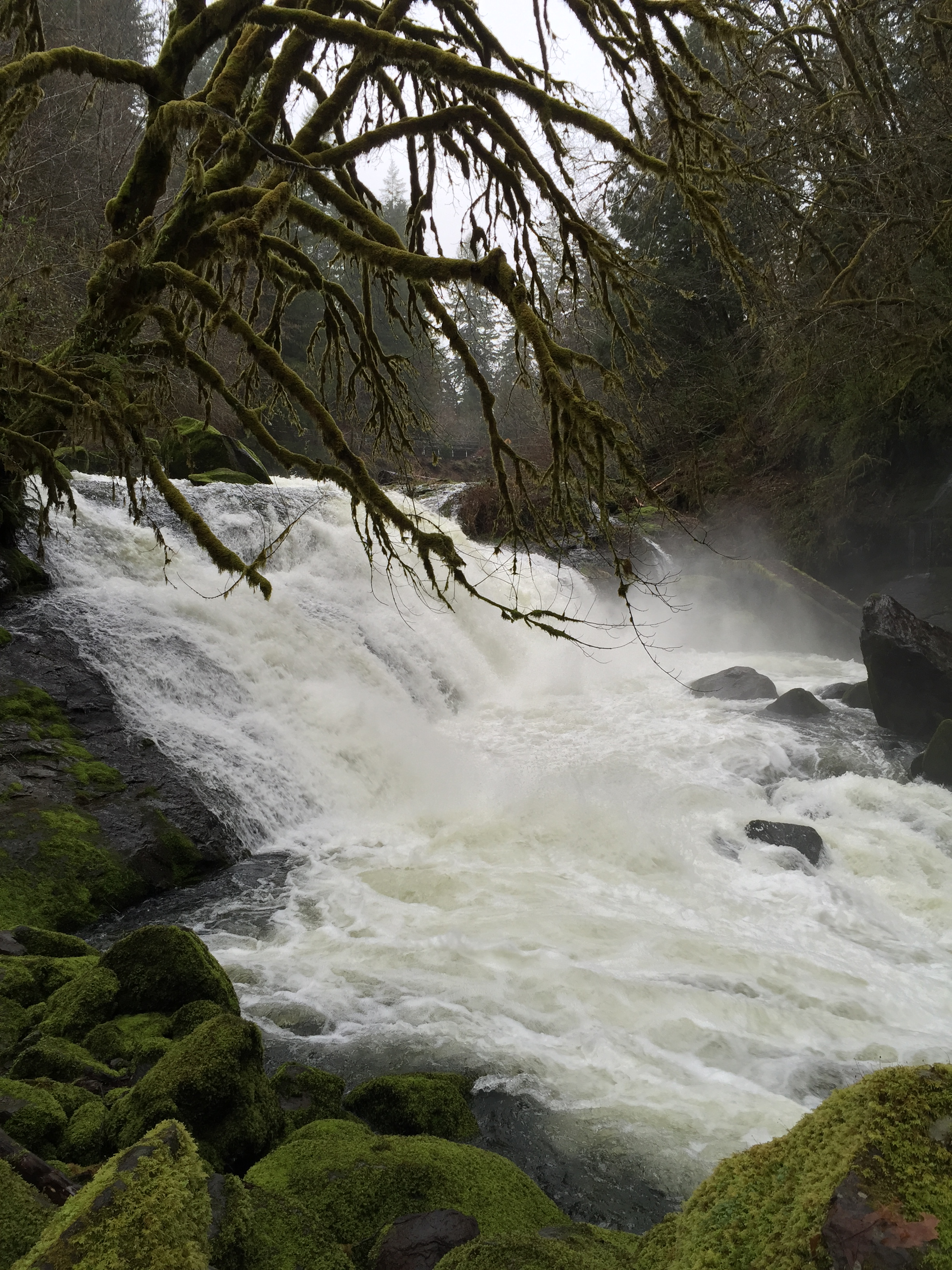
- Lake Creek Falls near Triangle Lake

- Location of the mouth of Lake Creek in Oregon
- Etymology: For Triangle Lake

Location
- Country: United States
- State: Oregon
- County: Lane

Physical characteristics
- Source: near Prairie Mountain
  - location: Central Oregon Coast Range, Siuslaw National Forest
  - coordinates: 44°16′43″N 123°34′18″W
  - elevation: 2,752 ft (839 m)
- Mouth: Siuslaw River
  - location: Swisshome
  - coordinates: 44°03′19″N 123°47′47″W
  - elevation: 112 ft (34 m)
- Length: 40 mi (64 km)
- Basin size: 223 sq mi (580 km^{2})
- Discharge
  - average: 706 cu ft/s (20.0 m^{3}/s)

Lake Creek is a major tributary of the Siuslaw River in Lane County in the U.S. state of Oregon. On average, the 40-mile (64 km) long creek contributes about a third of the lower Siuslaw's water volume.

Beginning near Prairie Mountain near the Lane–Benton county border in the Central Oregon Coast Range, Lake Creek flows generally southeast through the Siuslaw National Forest to the vicinity of Horton, then southwest through the communities of Blachly, Triangle Lake, Greenleaf, and Deadwood. It enters the Siuslaw River at Swisshome, 29 miles (47 km) by water from the larger stream's mouth on the Pacific Ocean at Florence.

== Transportation ==
Oregon Route 36 runs along the creek from Blachly to Swisshome. Near Greenleaf, a covered bridge known as Lake Creek Bridge or Nelson Mountain Bridge carries Nelson Mountain Road over the creek. Nelson Road meets Route 36 just north of the bridge. The bridge is on the National Register of Historic Places.

== Recreation ==
=== Picnicking ===
The Bureau of Land Management oversees the Lake Creek Falls recreation site downstream of Triangle Lake. Open all year, the site is used for picnicking, swimming, and viewing runs of steelhead and coho and Chinook salmon as they travel upstream to spawn. The BLM added a fish ladder at this site in 1989; it opened 110 miles (180 km) additional stream-miles to migrating fish.

The BLM also manages a site at Hult Reservoir, also known as Hult Pond, along Lake Creek upstream of Horton. Possible activities include picnicking, boating, and warm-water fishing. Amenities include a boat launch and toilets. Nearby is the Hult Equestrian Staging Area for horse riding on trails.

=== Whitewater boating ===
Whitewater enthusiasts sometimes run an 8-mile (13 km) stretch between Deadwood on Lake Creek and Tide on the Siuslaw River. Various parts of the run are rated from class I (novice) to class IV (advanced) on the International Scale of River Difficulty, depending on location and flow rates. Hazards include rapids called "The Horn" and "Bus Stop" with large waves and rocks. Along the river below the confluence with the creek, a sometimes-submerged human-made structure poses danger to boaters.

=== Fishing ===
Lake Creek supports populations of steelhead, Chinook salmon, and cutthroat trout that can be legally caught under certain conditions. Fishing for wild steelhead is catch and release, but some finclipped hatchery steelhead can be kept. Fishing for Chinook is allowed below Deadwood Creek. Cutthroat fishing is legal along the main stem but not the tributaries. Fishing for coho salmon, which also frequent the creek, is prohibited. Other regulations may apply depending on species, season, and location.

== Tributaries ==
Named tributaries of Lake Creek from source to mouth are Billy Tower Canyon followed by Congdon, Swartz, Village, Conrad, Pope, Post, and Swamp creeks. Then come Pontiss, Little Lake, Spring Canyon, Fish, Lamb, and Greenleaf creeks. Further downstream are Steinhauer, Wheeler, Nelson, Wilcut, Hollo, Johnston, Deadwood, and Indian creeks.

== See also ==
- List of rivers of Oregon
