= Low Pass, Oregon =

Unincorporated community in the state of Oregon, United States

- Unincorporated community
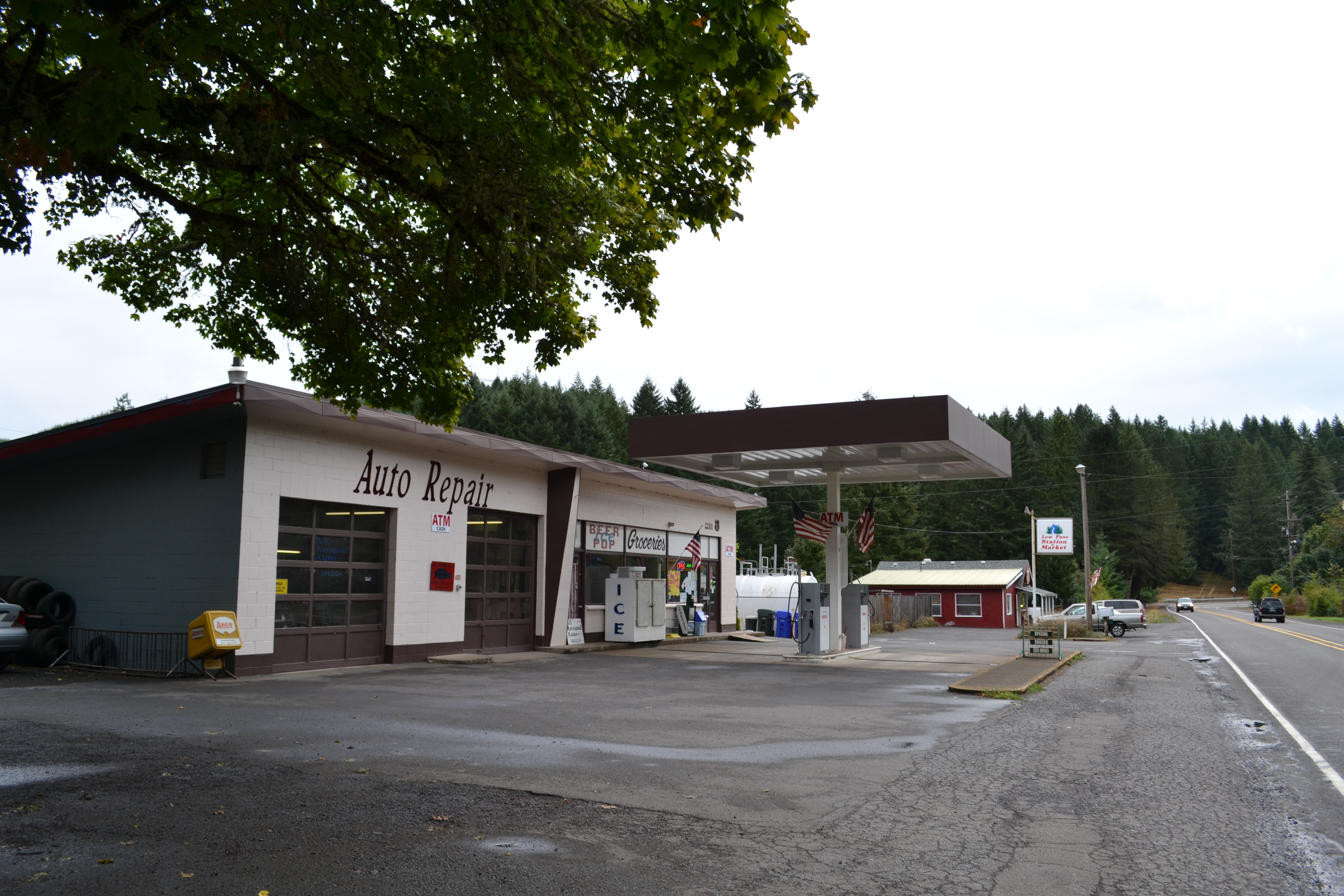
- Buildings in Low Pass

- Location within Oregon Location within the United States
- Coordinates: 44°11′19″N 123°27′14″W
- Country: United States
- State: Oregon
- County: Lane
- Elevation: 614 ft (187 m)
- Time zone: UTC-8 (Pacific (PST))
  - Summer (DST): UTC-7 (PDT)
- ZIP code: 97419
- Area codes: 458 and 541
- GNIS feature ID: 1136499

Low Pass is an unincorporated community in Lane County, Oregon, United States, on the Long Tom River, 5 miles (8 km) east of Blachly and 11 miles (18 km) west of Cheshire.

The settlement is centered on a small pullout on Oregon Route 36 with a gas station/convenience store and a diner that serves as an unofficial community center for rural residents.

The settlement is named for its location on a slight rise approaching the foothills of the Coast Range mountains, in contrast to the nearby mountain pass High Pass. Much of the land west of Low Pass consists of old-growth forest owned by the Bureau of Land Management.

The community has also been known as "Long Tom Station" after the nearby river; the name "Low Pass" was made official by a United States Board on Geographic Names decision of 1985.
