= Tide, Oregon =

Unincorporated community in the state of Oregon, United States

- Unincorporated community
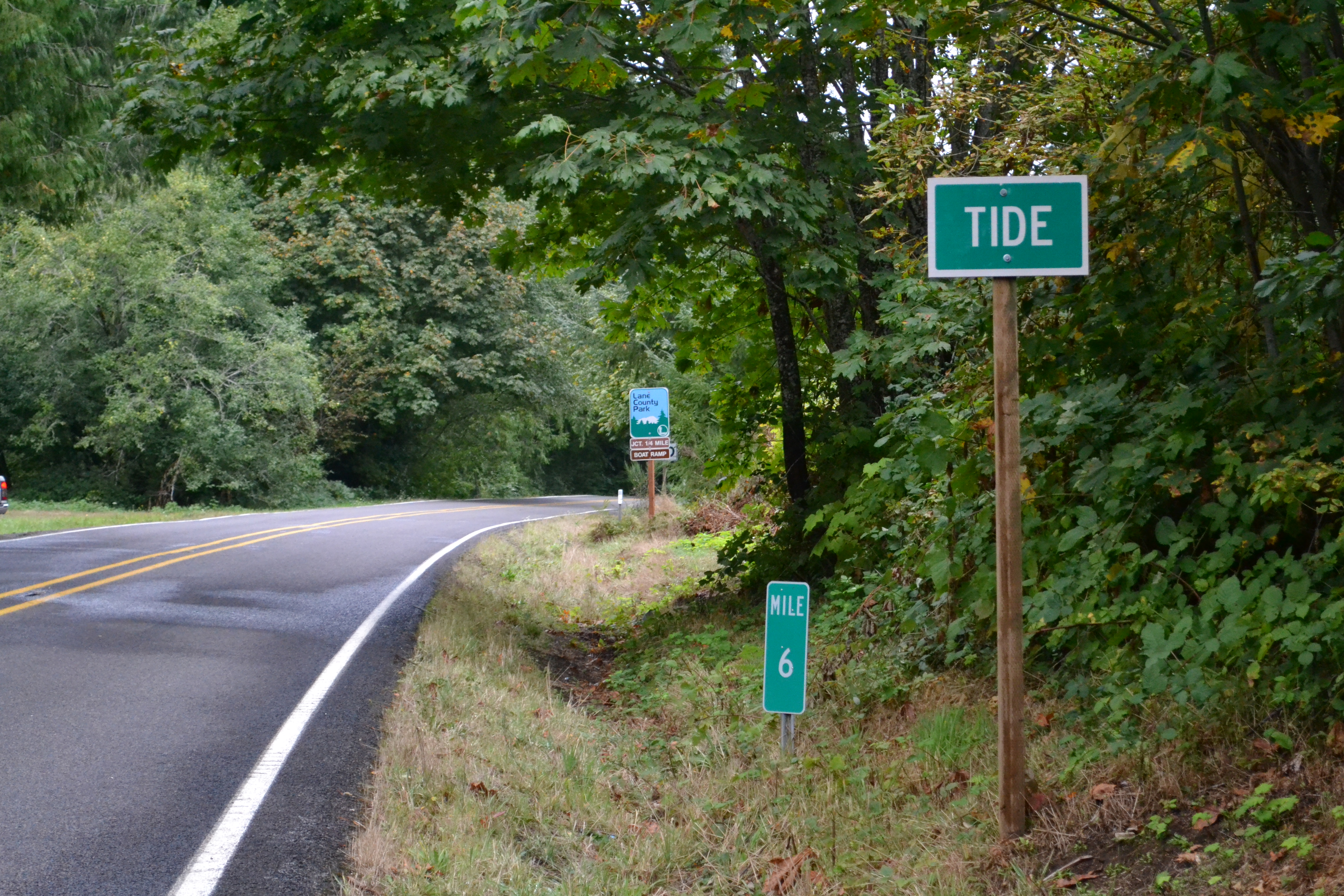

- Location within Oregon
- Coordinates: 44°03′59″N 123°50′24″W
- Country: United States
- State: Oregon
- County: Lane
- Elevation: 66 ft (20 m)
- Time zone: UTC-8 (Pacific (PST))
  - Summer (DST): UTC-7 (PDT)
- ZIP code: 97453
- GNIS feature ID: 1151210

Tide is an unincorporated community in Lane County, Oregon, United States,

== Geography ==
Tide is on Oregon Route 36, approximately six miles (10 km) east of its junction with Oregon Route 126 in Mapleton, near the Siuslaw River. It is located on the Mapleton-Junction City Highway, being one of the towns on a 49 miles (79 km)-stretch of road: "Blachly, Brickerville, Cheshire, Deadwood, Farnham Landing, Firo, Goldson, Greenleaf, Low Pass, Mapleton, Rainrock, Swain, Swisshome, [and] Tide." Tide is located between Rainrock and Swisshome. The community, according to the state of Oregon, is located along Cleveland Creek, where that body of water, a salmon-bearing stream, joins the Siuslaw River.

== History ==
The Assembly of God Church is located in Tide, and serves Tide and nearby Swisshome. This church has been active since at least the middle of the last century.

Tide Wayside County Park is located just west of Tide. The covered bridge there was installed in 1925. A primitive boat launching site exists between Tide and nearby Farnham. Activities allowed at the park include swimming, fishing, picnicking, and crawfishing.

In 2018, the state of Oregon proposed creating a 70 feet (21 m) bridge on Highway 36 in Tide, replacing an existing culvert that blocked salmon from reaching the Siuslaw River. The estimated expense for the project was around $1.3 million, and was intended to remediate the Tide culvert from being "a complete barrier to juvenile aquatic species passage, including ESA threatened Oregon Coast ESU Coho Salmon, Oregon Coast DPS steelhead, cutthroat trout, and Pacific lamprey."

== See also ==
- Saginaw, Oregon
