= Deadwood Creek (Oregon) =

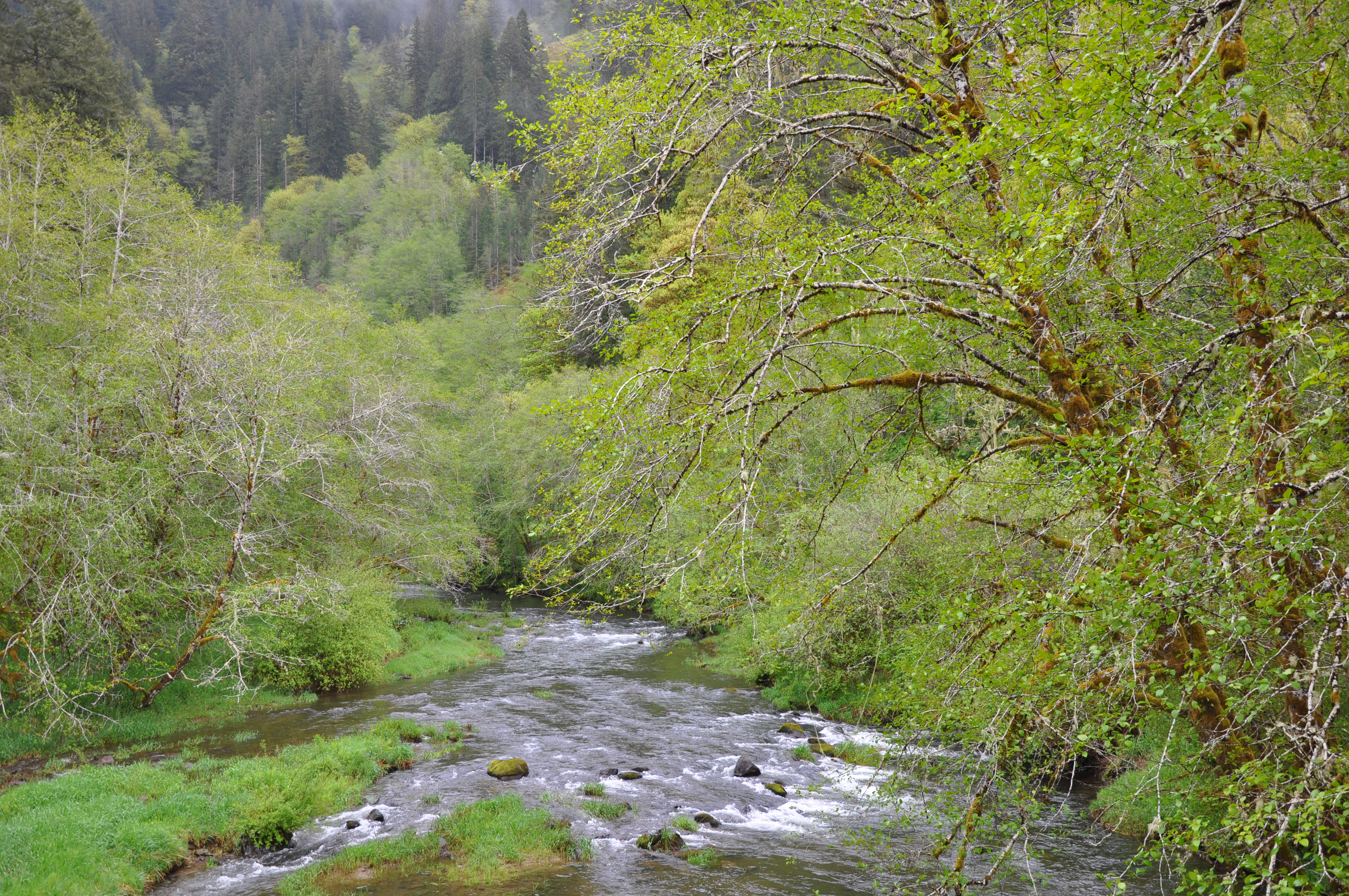
- Looking upstream about 3 miles (5 km) from Deadwood

- Location of the mouth of Deadwood Creek in Oregon
- Etymology: For dead timber snags along its banks in the 19th century

Location
- Country: United States
- State: Oregon
- County: Lane

Physical characteristics
- Source: near Taylor Butte
  - location: Central Oregon Coast Range, Siuslaw National Forest
  - coordinates: 44°15′32″N 123°41′30″W
  - elevation: 1,385 ft (422 m)
- Mouth: Lake Creek
  - location: Deadwood
  - coordinates: 44°05′40″N 123°45′34″W
  - elevation: 243 ft (74 m)

Deadwood Creek is a tributary of Lake Creek in the Siuslaw River basin in Lane County in the U.S. state of Oregon. Beginning near Taylor Butte in the Central Oregon Coast Range, it meanders generally southwest through the Siuslaw National Forest to meet the larger creek at the rural community of Deadwood. This is 5 miles (8 km) from Lake Creek's confluence with the river near Swisshome and 34 miles (55 km) by water from the Siuslaw River's mouth on the Pacific Ocean at Florence.

Upstream of Deadwood, the creek passes under Deadwood Creek Bridge, a covered bridge carrying Deadwood Loop Road. The bridge was added to the National Register of Historic Places in 1979.

== Fishing ==
The creek supports a population of wild winter steelhead for which catch and release fishing is allowed. However, fishing is not allowed for any species in Deadwood Creek from April 1 to December 31 to protect Chinook salmon while they are spawning.

== Tributaries ==
The creek's named tributaries from source to mouth are Fawn, Elk, Panther, Buck, Rock and Karlstrom creeks. Then come Alpha, Deer, Bear, Raleigh, and Swartz creeks followed by West Fork Deadwood Creek. Below that are Boyle and Green creeks.

== See also ==
- List of rivers of Oregon
