= High Pass =

High Pass may refer to:

- High Pass (Oregon), a mountain pass in the Coast Range mountains, Oregon, United States
- High Pass (Middle-earth), a mountain pass near Rivendell in J. R. R. Tolkien's fictional world of Middle-earth
- High-pass filter, an electronic filter

== See also ==
- High Pass Filter (band), electro-dub band formed in Melbourne, Australia
- High Passage, a gaming magazine first published in 1981
