= Goldson, Oregon =

Unincorporated community in the state of Oregon, United States

- Unincorporated community
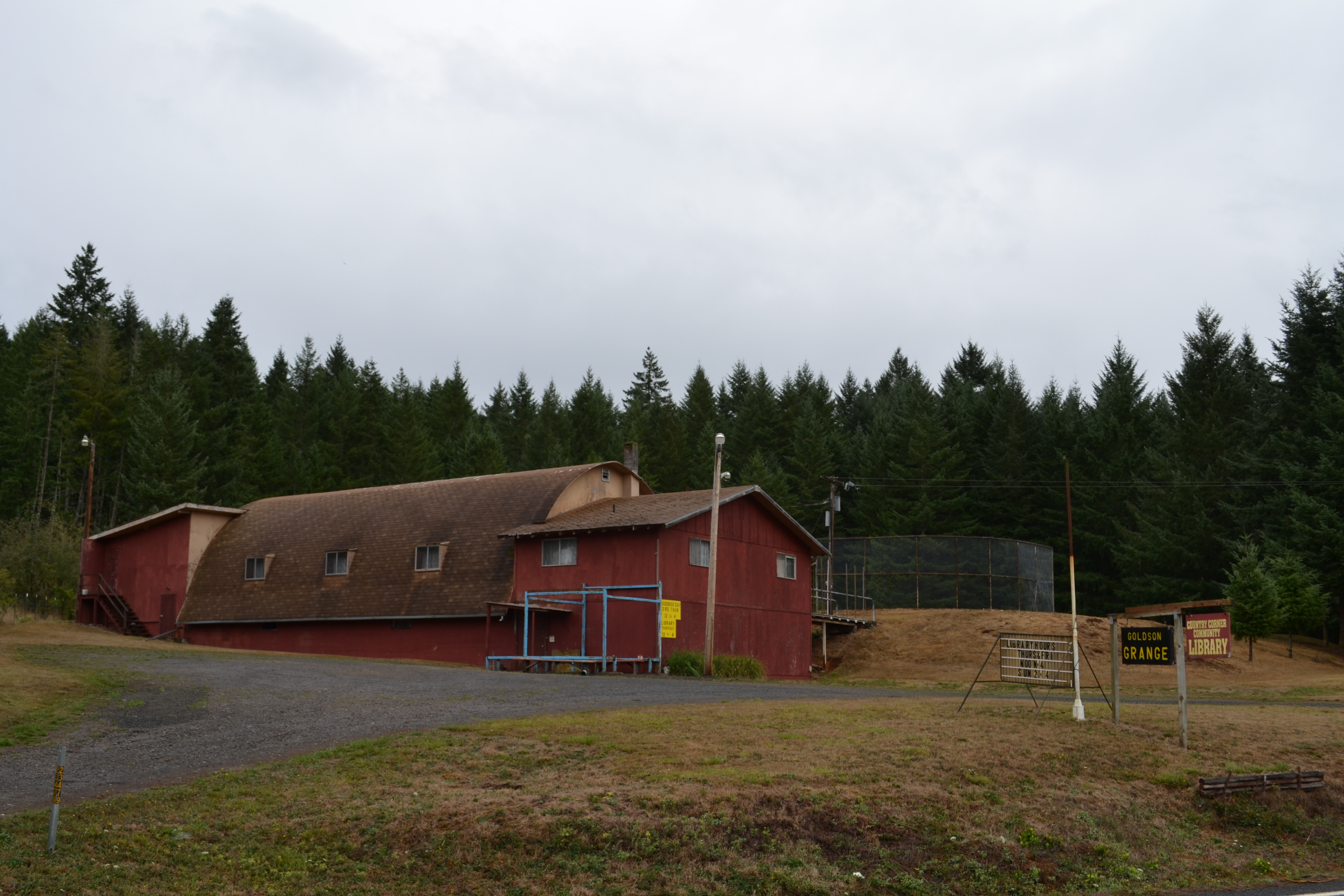
- Goldson library and grange

- Location within Oregon Location within the United States
- Coordinates: 44°09′47″N 123°20′33″W
- Country: United States
- State: Oregon
- County: Lane
- Elevation: 407 ft (124 m)
- Time zone: UTC-8 (Pacific (PST))
  - Summer (DST): UTC-7 (PDT)
- GNIS feature ID: 1136324

Goldson is an unincorporated community in Lane County, Oregon, United States on Oregon Route 36 near Bear Creek, about 3.5 miles (5.6 km) from Cheshire. Goldson post office was established in 1891 and named for the first postmaster, J. M. Goldson. It ran until 1934. The community's elevation is 404 feet (123 m).

As of 1990, there was no town center remaining at the site, but the Goldson Grange, 5 miles (8 km) to the west, remains active.
