= Greenleaf, Oregon =

Unincorporated community in Oregon, United States

- Unincorporated community
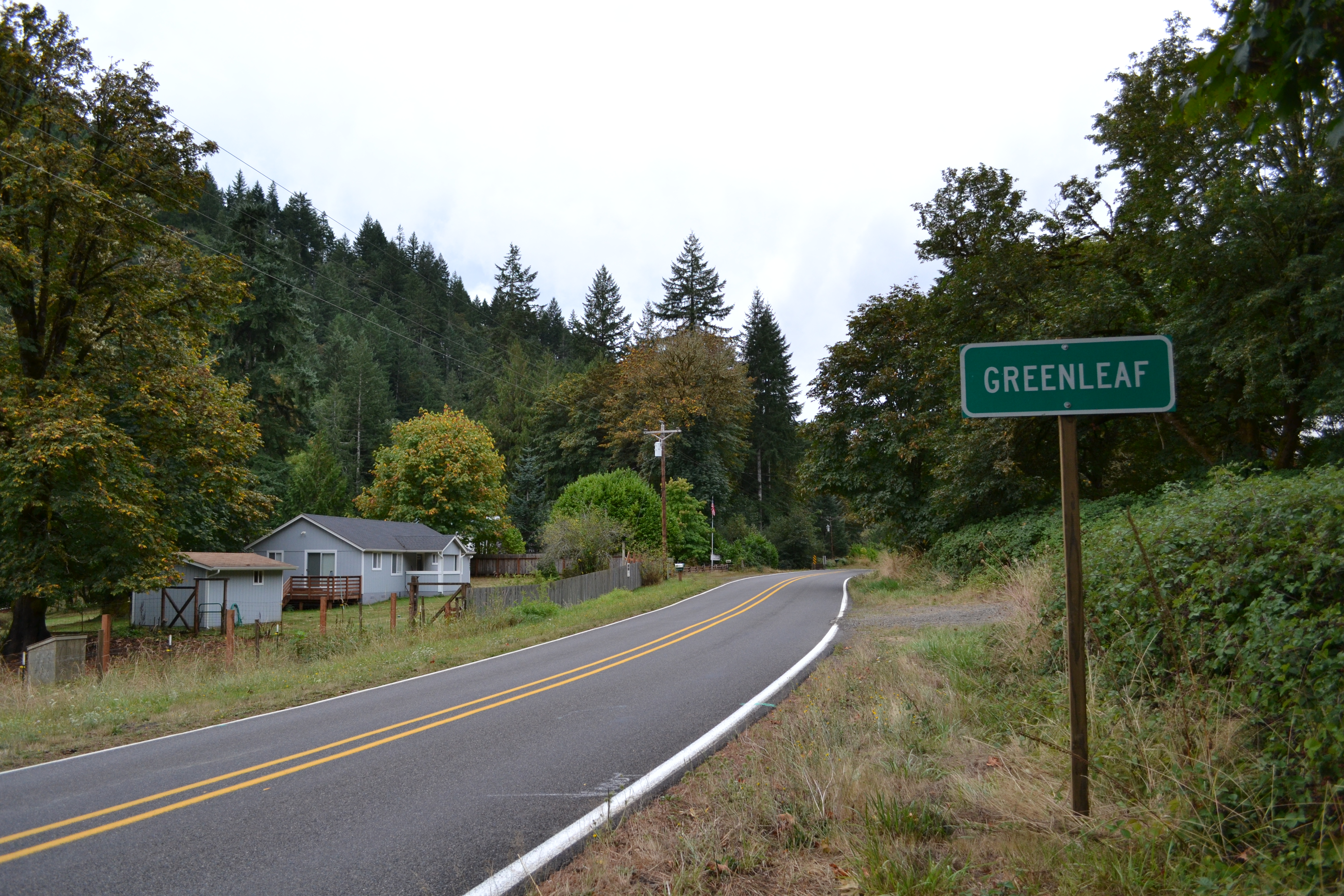
- Greenleaf highway marker

- Location within Oregon Location within the United States
- Coordinates: 44°06′49″N 123°40′01″W
- Country: United States
- State: Oregon
- County: Lane
- Elevation: 354 ft (108 m)
- Time zone: UTC-8 (Pacific (PST))
  - Summer (DST): UTC-7 (PDT)
- ZIP code: 97430
- GNIS feature ID: 1143064

Greenleaf is an unincorporated community in Lane County, Oregon, United States. Greenleaf lies on Oregon Route 36 east of Deadwood and west of Triangle Lake.

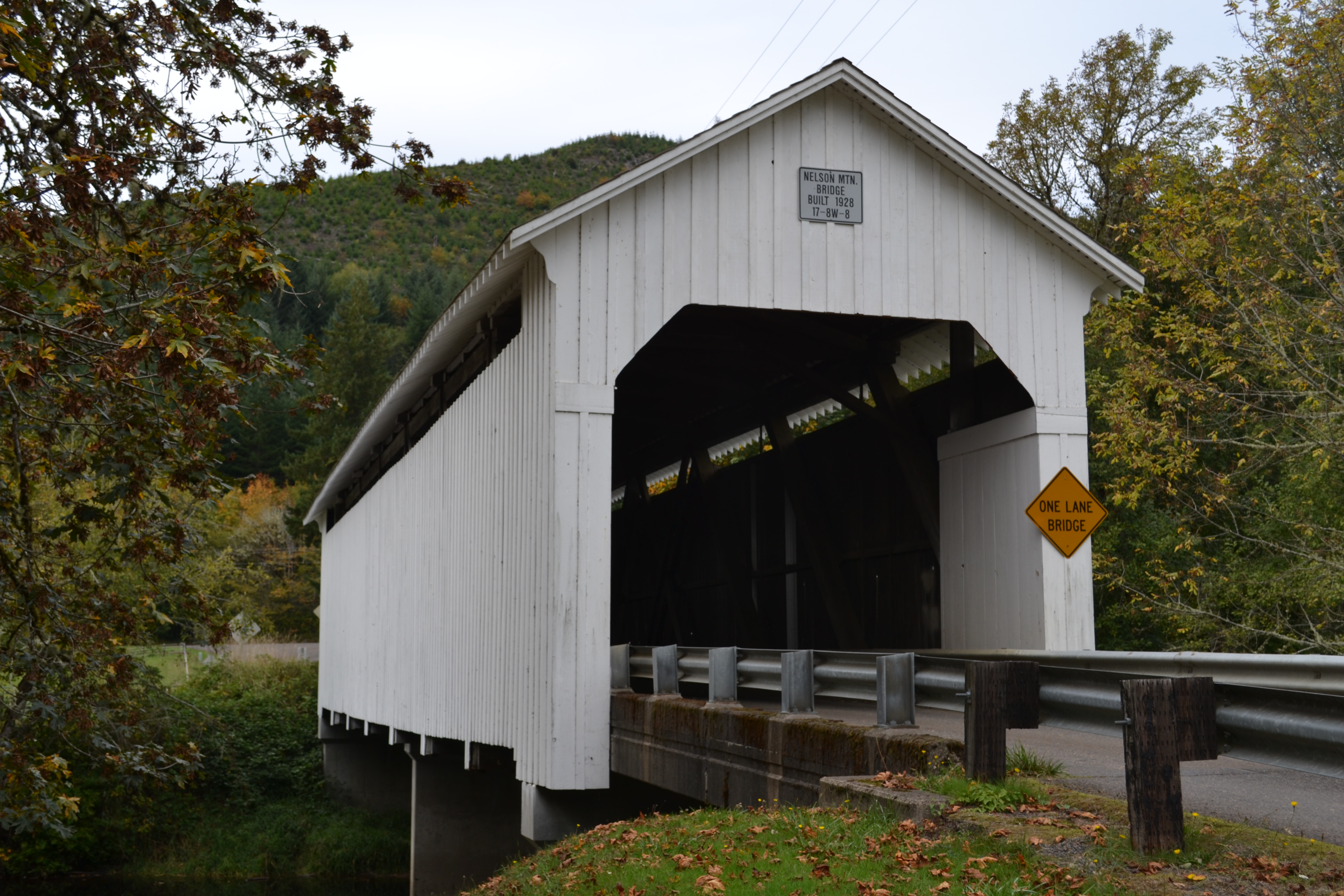
The Lake Creek Bridge near Greenleaf

The name Greenleaf was first applied to the community about 1885, and when a post office was established in the area in 1892, the same name was used. The name may refer to the abundance of bigleaf maple trees in the area. Greenleaf is also the name of a creek that flows into Lake Creek where the post office was first located. The post office was moved in 1908 about 3 miles (5 km) down Lake Creek. Greenleaf post office closed in 1987; Greenleaf now has a Deadwood mailing address.

The 1928 Lake Creek Bridge near Greenleaf is a covered bridge listed on the National Register of Historic Places.
