= High Pass (Oregon) =

Mountain pass in Oregon, United States

Coordinates: 44.228178°N 123.4528°W

High Pass is a mountain pass in the foothills of the Coast Range mountains in Lane County, Oregon, United States. High Pass Road connects the unincorporated community of Horton, on the west side of the pass, with Cheshire, Monroe, Junction City, and the other low-lying farm towns to the east. Oregon Route 36 provides an alternate route through the foothills over the nearby Low Pass.
