= Deadwood Creek Bridge =

Covered bridge in Oregon, US

- U.S. National Register of Historic Places
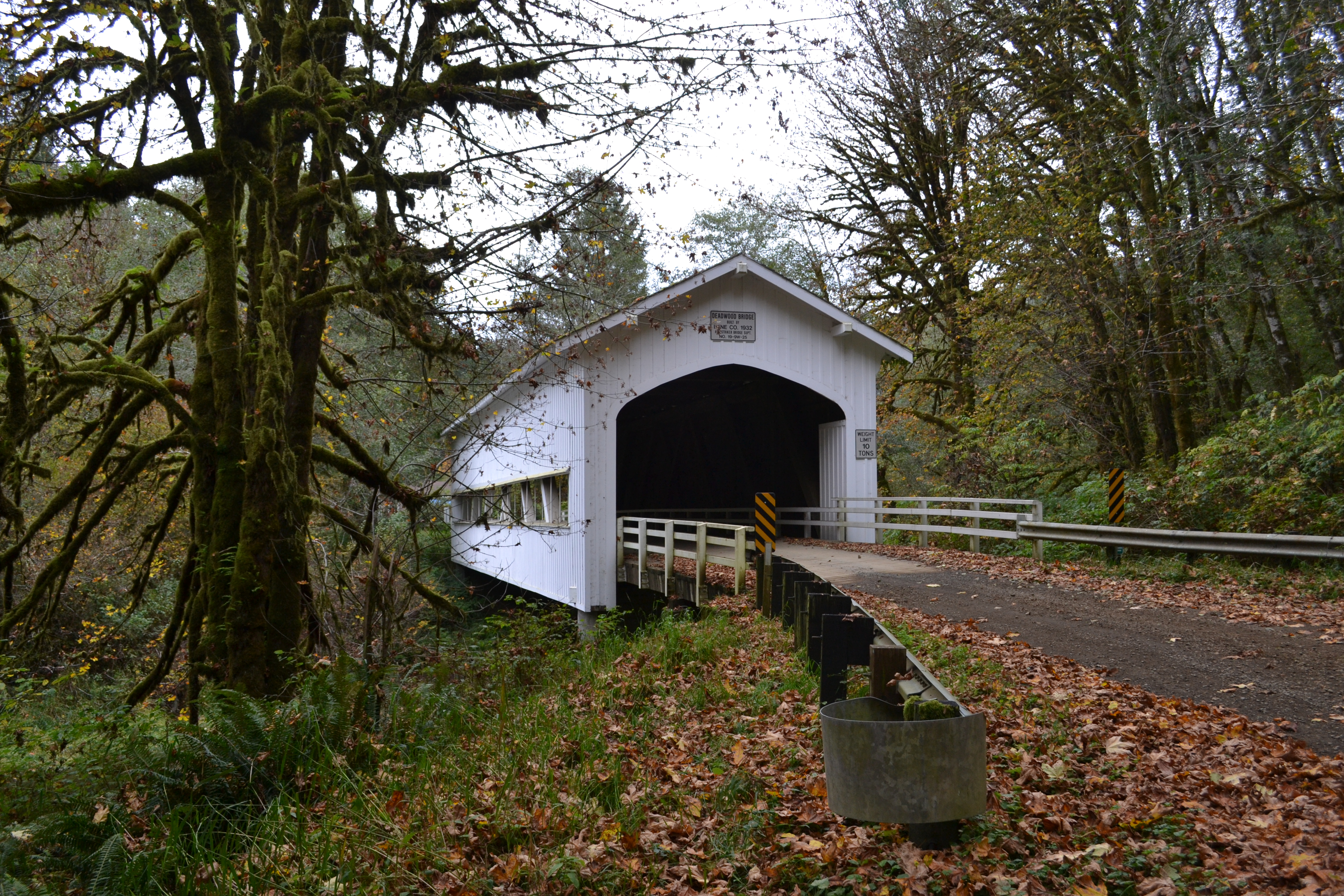
- The bridge carries Deadwood Loop Road over the creek.

- Location within Oregon Location within the United States
- Nearest city: Swisshome, Oregon
- Coordinates: 44°8′35″N 123°43′8″W
- Area: 0.2 acres (0.081 ha)
- Built: 1932
- Built by: Miller Sorenson
- Architectural style: Howe truss
- MPS: Oregon Covered Bridges TR
- NRHP reference No.: 79002099
- Added to NRHP: November 29, 1979

The Deadwood Creek Bridge is a covered bridge in western Lane County in the U.S. state of Oregon. Built in 1932, the 105-foot (32 m) Howe truss structure carries Deadwood Loop Road over Deadwood Creek. The crossing lies upstream of the rural community of Deadwood in the Siuslaw National Forest of the Central Oregon Coast Range. The bridge was added to the National Register of Historic Places in 1979.

A concrete bridge carrying Deadwood Road bypassed the covered bridge in the 1970s, and the older structure fell into disrepair. Lane County officials decided to pay for repairs, and by 1986 the bridge was fully restored.

== See also ==
- List of bridges on the National Register of Historic Places in Oregon
- National Register of Historic Places listings in Lane County, Oregon
