= Mary Lou Goertzen =

American artist (1929–2020)

- Born: 1929
- Died: 2020
- Known for: The Community Educates Its Children mural
- Spouse: Ernie Goertzen

Mary Lou Goertzen (1929–2020) was an American artist, peace activist and Mennonite.

Mary Lou and her late husband Ernie (1926–2004) are the subjects of the documentary Kind, True and Necessary (2006) by James Knight. The film documents their life of art, Christian pacifism and simple living. Ernie was a conscientious objector and, like his wife, an artist and Mennonite.

== Life ==
They lived in an old schoolhouse in Deadwood, Oregon from 1975. She was also a member of the Berkeley Friends Meeting (Quaker) and attended the Florence Worship Group, which is connected to the Eugene Friends Meeting. Mary Lou lived until her death in the spacious old schoolhouse and hosted Quaker meetings there every fifth Sunday of the month (if that month had a 5th Sunday).

Mary Lou painted the mural The Community Educates Its Children at the Henderson Community School in Henderson, Nebraska in 1955. The school, now known as the Heartland Community School, was in the media during 2009 due to the controversy between the school board and the citizens of Henderson to remove the mural. Initially, the school board canvassed the students, and determined that the midcentury modern work was "outdated." Then, the school board advised that a new mural would be a way to promote school spirit. After an outpouring of support from the community, the board took some time before determining the Goertzen mural's fate. Ultimately they chose to have her restore it.

Mary Lou became well known for her pen-and-ink drawings highlighted with splashes of watercolor, most often of flowers and plants. These were widely distributed as prints, note cards, stationery, and calendars. In 1980 her art drew the attention of Jay Block, CEO of Block China, and her designs were featured on Block Spal China from 1980 to 1990. She also published a book, "Lap and Nap Quilts and Comforters," that showcases 25 quilts she created from 1992 to 2013, along with handwritten notes about each.
