= Heartland Community School =

Location
- 1501 Front Street; Henderson, (York County), Nebraska 68371; United States
- Coordinates: 40°46′58″N 97°48′37″W

Information
- School type: Public school
- Motto: "Striving for excellence"
- Opened: 1954
- Principal: Tim Carr
- Staff: 13.75 (FTE)
- Enrollment: 156 (2022-23)
- Student to teacher ratio: 11.35
- Colors: Black, white and crimson
- Athletics conference: Southern Nebraska Conference
- Nickname: Bulldogs
- Website: www.heartlandschools.org

Heartland Community School is a public elementary and secondary education school located in Henderson, Nebraska, United States. Formerly known as Henderson Community School, its name was changed to encompass a school consolidation between Henderson and Bradshaw. The school has a total of 330 students.

== Mid-century modern architecture and art ==
Built in 1954, the school is an example of mid-century modern architecture. The entrance has a classic V-bar support and the exposed iron beams above the entry to the lobby. The entire lobby is host to the mural The Community Educates Its Children, painted in 1955 by Mary Lou Goertzen.

== Controversy ==
During the early 2009, a grassroots movement was started to save the mural. The school board canvassed the students and determined that the mid-century modern work was "outdated". While the mural was generating public support, it was disclosed that the school board was considering "modernizing" the front entrance and lobby, in particular, considering replacement of the classic mid-century modern architecture, unique to rural Nebraska.

== Extracurricular Activities ==
Heartland Community schools offers a variety of extracurricular activities including basketball, football, volleyball, track and field, golf, drama, and FBLA.

=== Athletic State Championships ===
Heartland Community schools teams won numerous state championships. The boys' basketball team won the state championship in 1986 and 1984. In 1983, 1989, 2000 and 2002 the boys track and field team won the state championship. The football team won the state championship in 1981 and 1983.

=== Marching Band Awards ===
The Heartland Community school's marching band led by Royce Schweitzer won Harvest of Harmony in 2013, 2014 and 2015.
