= Dick Shane =

American actor and stuntman

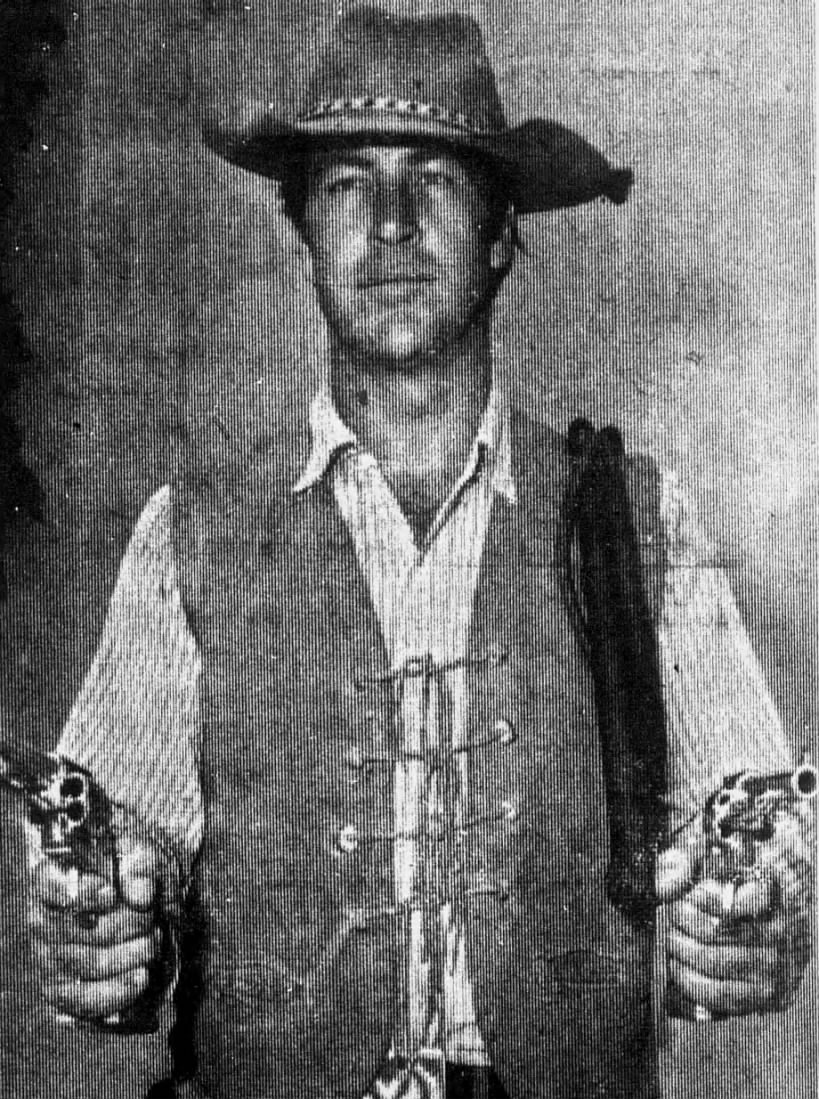
- Shane in 1967
- Born: Richard Lee Cheshire; July 22, 1932; Cheshire, Oregon, U.S.
- Died: June 29, 2014 (aged 81); Las Vegas, Nevada, U.S.
- Occupations: Actor, stuntman

Richard Lee Cheshire (July 22, 1932 – June 29, 2014) was an American actor and stuntman. He was best known for playing the recurring role of Dick, a ranch hand in the American western television series The Virginian.

== Life and career ==
Shane was born in Cheshire, Oregon. He was the brother of Choya Shane, a stuntman. At a young age, he worked for farmers, and in a logging company. He studied acting at the Jimmy Best Acting School. He began his screen career in 1960, becoming a stuntman for Anthony Mann's film Cimarron. He stunt doubled for actors Clu Gulager, Stewart Granger and Fernando Lamas.

Later in his career, Shane played the recurring role of Dick, a ranch hand in the NBC western television series The Virginian. Aside from his role, he served as a stunt double for James Drury in the television series. He guest-starred in television programs including Highway Patrol and Iron Horse, and appeared in the 1975 film Gone with the West.

== Death ==
Shane died on June 29, 2014, in Las Vegas, Nevada, at the age of 81.
