= Lorane, Oregon =

Unincorporated community in the state of Oregon, United States

- Unincorporated community
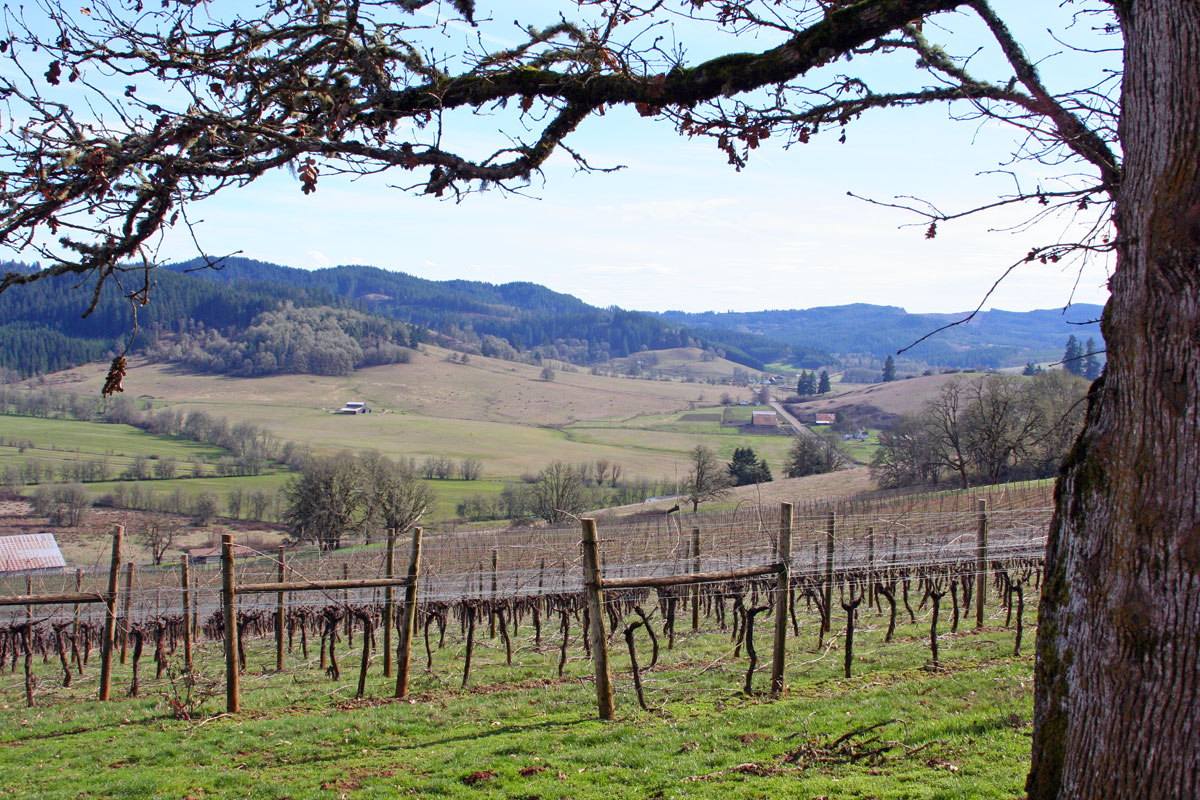
- Winery in and around Lorane

- Location within Oregon Location within the United States
- Coordinates: 43°50′15″N 123°14′20″W
- Country: United States
- State: Oregon
- County: Lane
- Elevation: 682 ft (208 m)
- Time zone: UTC-8 (Pacific (PST))
  - Summer (DST): UTC-7 (PDT)
- ZIP codes: 97451
- GNIS feature ID: 1136502

Lorane is an unincorporated community in Lane County, Oregon, United States. It is located on Territorial Road about 20 miles (32 km) southwest of Eugene; it is 13 miles (21 km) northwest of Cottage Grove. The community is near the headwaters of the North Fork Siuslaw River in a valley in the foothills of the Central Oregon Coast Range. Local businesses include several wineries, including the King Estate Winery, Chateau Lorane Winery and Iris Hill Winery, and two general stores.

Lorane is also home to several notable late-19th-century/early-20th-century buildings, including the Lorane Christian Church, built in 1889, the Lorane Rebekah Lodge, built in 1898, and the Lorane Grange hall, built in 1909.

Although Lorane is unincorporated, it has a post office; Lorane's ZIP code is 97451.

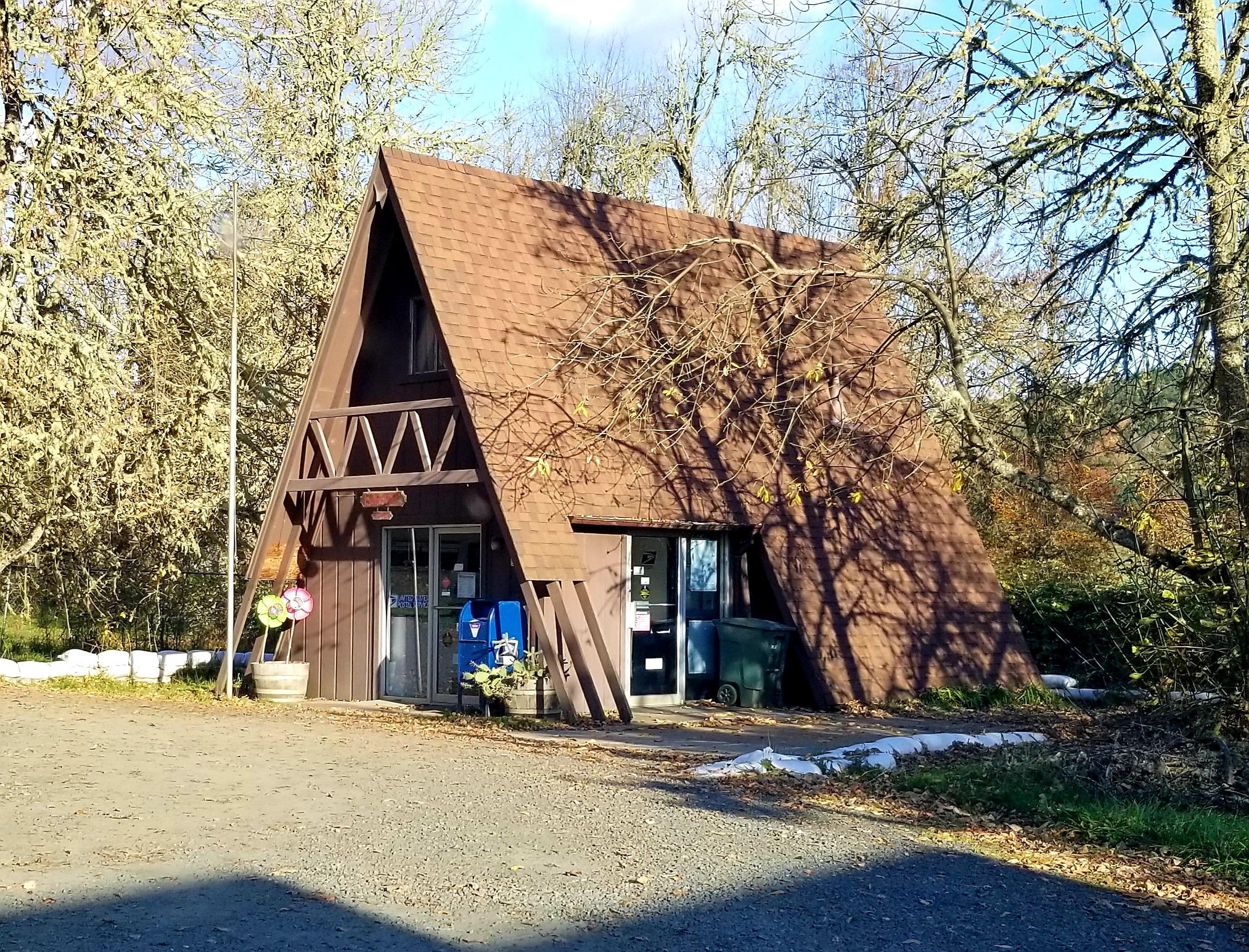
Lorane, Oregon post office, on the Territorial Highway

Lorane is served by the Crow-Applegate-Lorane School District, including Lorane Elementary School, which was established in 1892 but closed in 2011.

== History ==
Lorane was settled by white settlers who participated in the US expansion Westward to Oregon, encouraged by the Donation Land Claim Act of 1850, which gave 320 acres of free land to any unmarried white male citizen, or 640 acres to every married couple, who moved to the Oregon Territory before December 1, 1850. First settler contact in Lorane is thought to have occurred in the early 1850s, with significant colonial landmarks being the Applegate Trail, a stagecoach route, the Cartwright House (Mountain House Hotel), and the original landscape intended for the Southern Pacific Railroad. The Railroad was built in Cottage Grove, 12 miles east of Lorane.

The indigenous keepers of the land that Lorane occupies are the Siuslaw people, who are believed to have arrived to the Oregon coast over 9,000 years ago. They spoke the Siuslaw language, but the last documented speakers of Siuslawan were the Barrett family and Billy Dick of Florence, who were interviewed in the 1950s. However, there are ongoing language revitalization efforts, knowledge of which is exclusive to tribal members.

Today, knowledge of the indigenous inhabitants of Lorane has all but disappeared in the community of Lorane. Documented interaction with the first settler-colonizers of Lorane and the Siuslaw people is exceptionally rare, summed up by the statement "there is a tradition of a Siuslaw village in the Lorane Valley, southwest of Eugene." The land that Lorane rests on possesses a history that has been confined to the past due to the lack of Siuslaw people in the area of Lorane and the ease in which white settlers claim land as their own.
