= King Estate Winery =

Organic winery in Oregon, US

Coordinates: 43.853°N 123.237°W

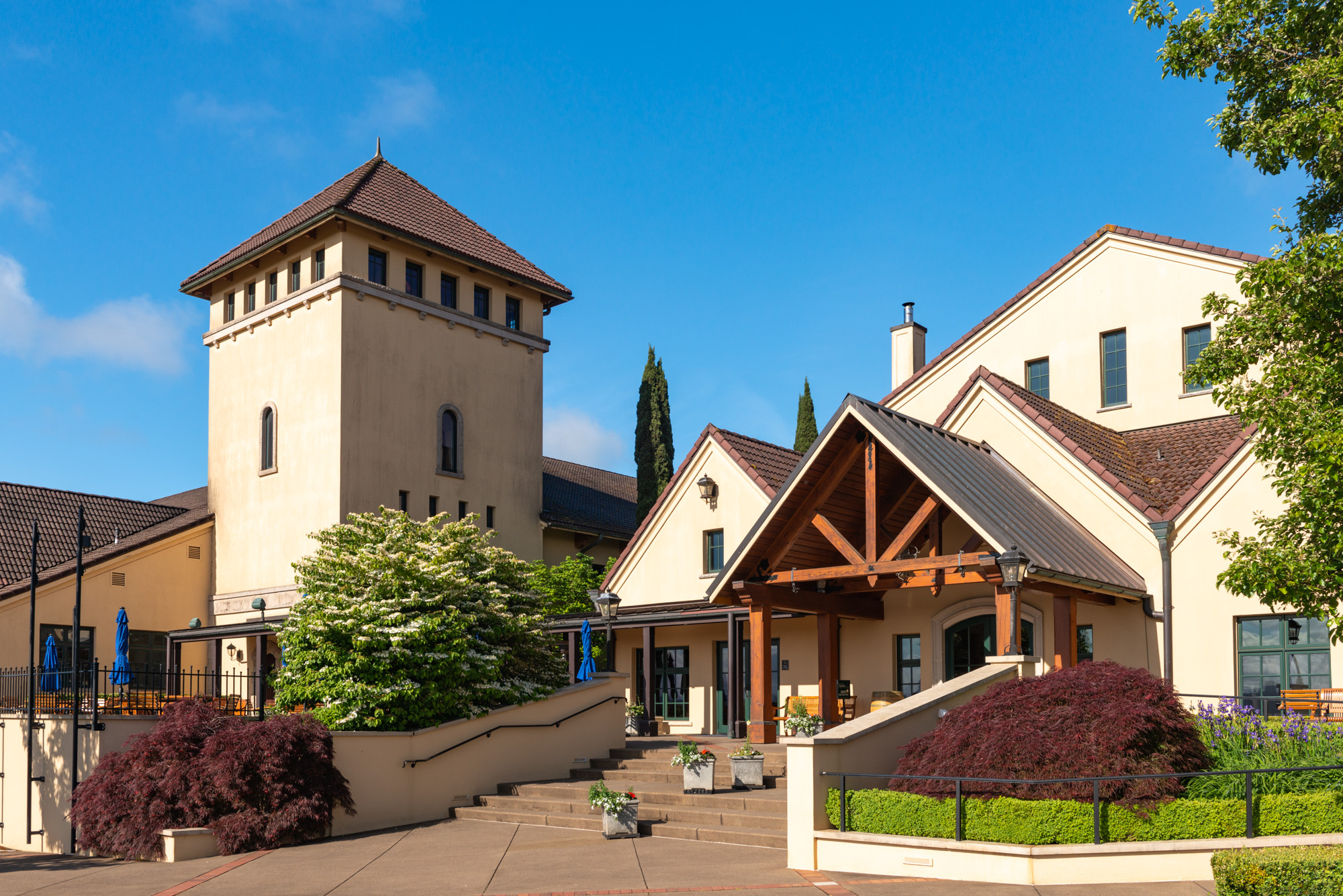
- Location: Eugene, Oregon, USA
- Appellation: Oregon
- Other labels: Domaine, Signature, Acrobat by King Estate, NxNW (North by Northwest), next: by King Estate, Lorane Valley
- Founded: 1991
- First vintage: 1992
- Key people: Ed King III, Ed King Jr.
- Known for: Pinot gris & Pinot noir
- Varietals: Pinot gris, Pinot noir, Chardonnay, Riesling, Cabernet Sauvignon, Syrah
- Distribution: Worldwide
- Website: www.kingestate.com

King Estate Winery is a family owned, Biodynamic® winery located southwest of Eugene, Oregon, United States near the community of Lorane. Matt Kramer of The Oregonian considers King Estate the benchmark producer of Pinot gris in the country. While the winery also makes Pinot noir and limited amounts of Chardonnay, it is mainly credited with bringing the Pinot gris grape varietal into national consciousness.

The winery was founded in 1991 by Ed King Jr. and his son, Ed King III. The estate is 1,033 acres with 450 planted to vine, plus another 70 acres of grapes at nearby Pfeiffer Vineyard, which King Estate acquired in 2022. In addition, the estate features 24 acres of gardens and orchards growing produce for its restaurant along with lavender and flowers.

In the 2007 edition of Wine & Spirits magazine's annual restaurant poll, a survey of only the top Zagat rated restaurants across the United States, King Estate Pinot gris was the number one ranked domestic wine in the Pinot gris/Pinot grigio category. It was also number two overall in the category, the highest rank for an Oregon producer in the 18-year history of the poll.

== Sustainability ==
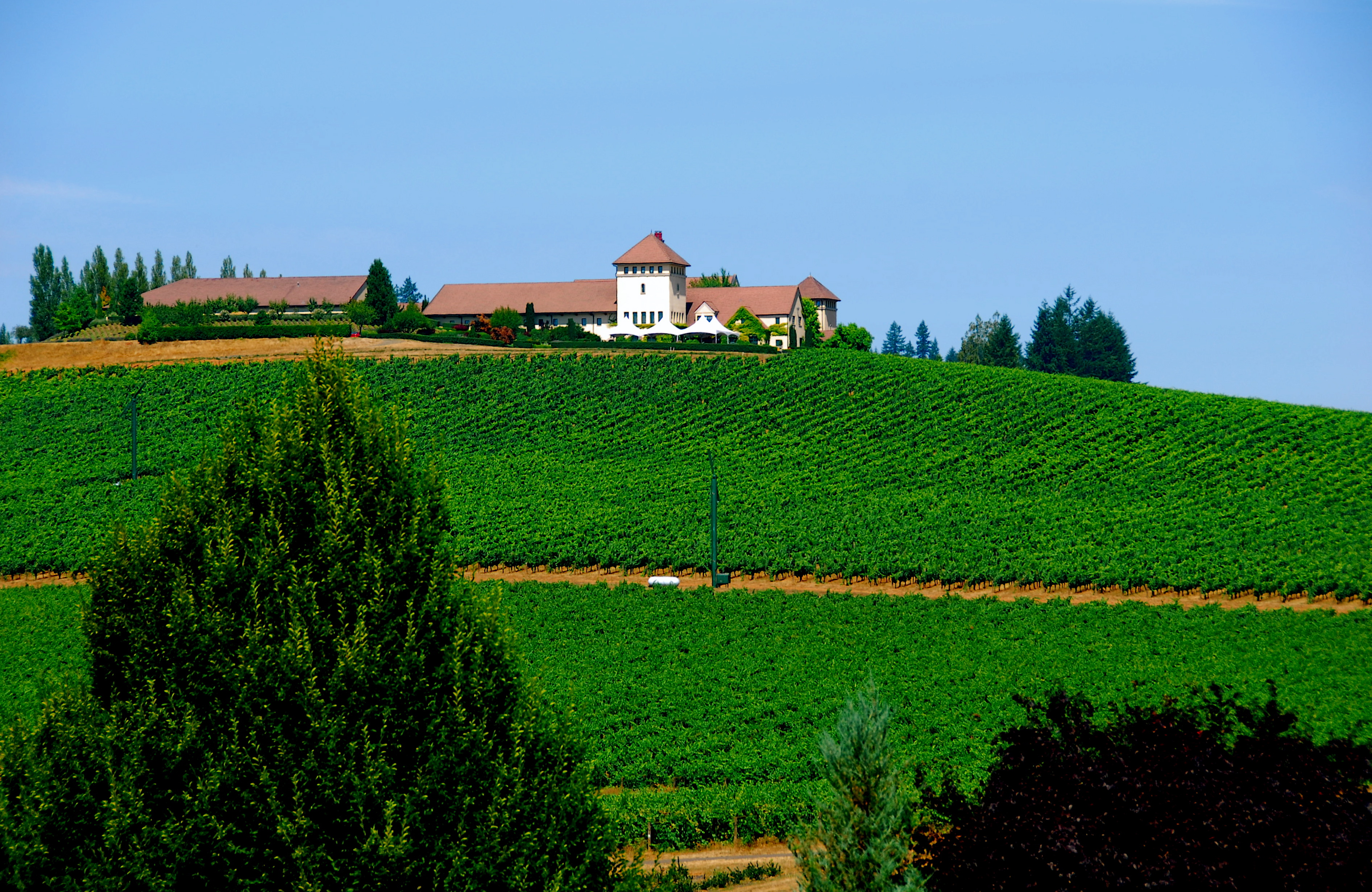
King Estate Winery and vineyards

King Estate Winery is Certified Organic by Oregon Tilth and in 2016 was certified as Biodynamic by Demeter USA, making it the largest Biodynamic vineyard in North America. In 2005, King Estate was recognized by Oregon Tilth as the Organic producer of the year.

== Culinary ==
During the 1990s, King Estate published two cookbooks: New American Cuisine King Estate Pinot Gris Cookbook and New American Cuisine King Estate Pinot Noir Cookbook. They were written in conjunction with the 13-part New American Cuisine television series broadcast by PBS and other public television stations nationwide. In 1997, New American Cuisine was nominated for the prestigious James Beard Award for best national cooking series. The cookbooks contain recipes contributed by chefs namely Alice Waters, Roy Yamaguchi, Charlie Trotter, and Jean-Georges Vongerichten.

== See also ==
- Oregon wine
