= Lake Creek Bridge =

Covered bridge in Oregon, US

- U.S. National Register of Historic Places
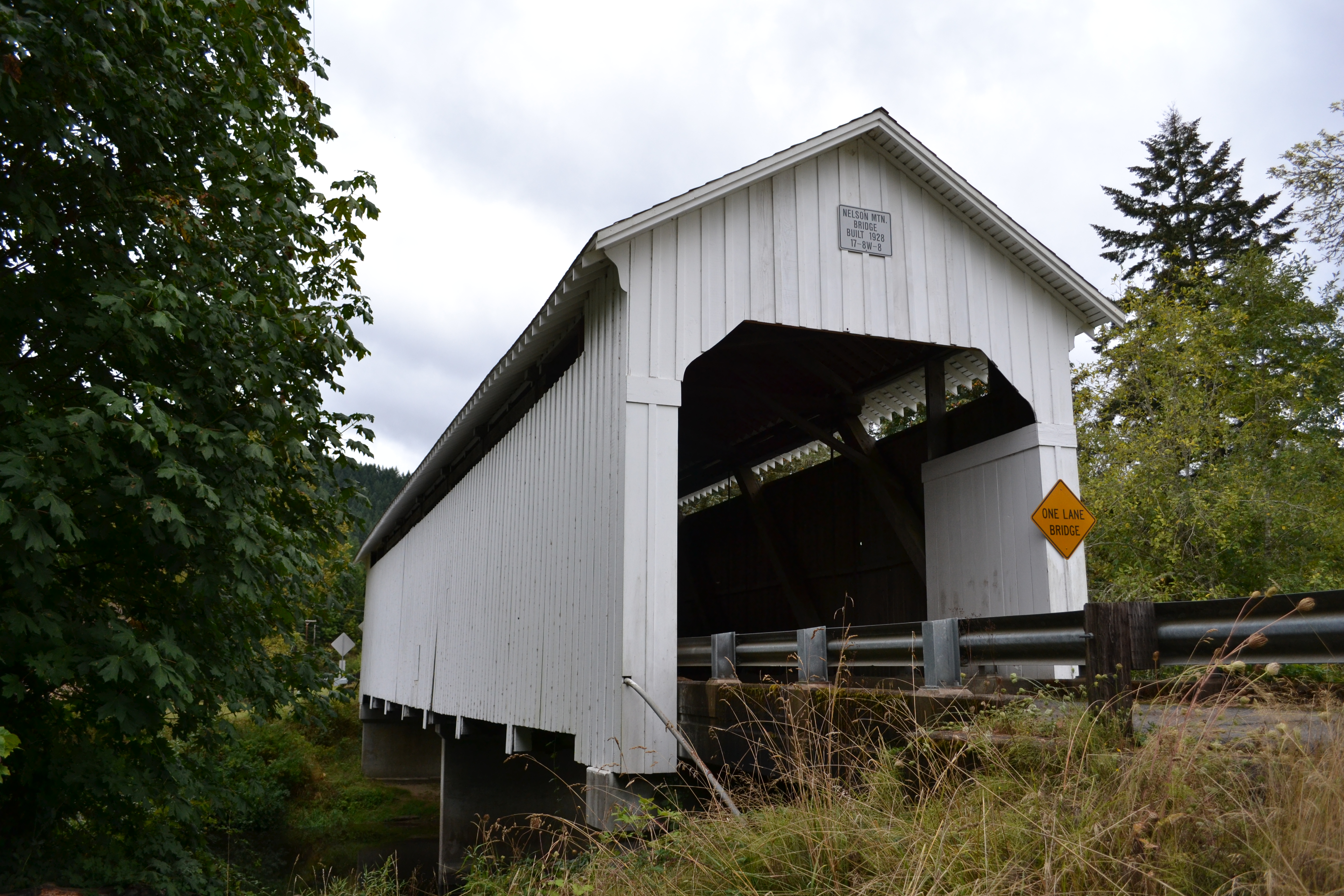
- The bridge carries Nelson Mountain Road.

- Location within Oregon Location within the United States
- Coordinates: 44°06′15.6″N 123°40′25.1″W
- Built: 1928
- Architectural style: Howe truss
- MPS: Oregon Covered Bridges TR
- NRHP reference No.: 79002091
- Added to NRHP: November 29, 1979

The Lake Creek Bridge also known as the Nelson Mountain Bridge, is a covered bridge near Greenleaf, in the U.S. state of Oregon, that is listed on the National Register of Historic Places. The 105-foot (32 m) covered bridge, built in 1928, carries Nelson Mountain Road over Lake Creek in Lane County.

Notable features of the bridge include upper and lower truss chords made of one-piece old-growth timbers, narrow ribbon windows at the eaves, and portals that are truncated rectangular arches. A renovation in 1984 added new reinforced concrete abutments, new flooring, and other alterations to increase the bridge's load capacity.

== See also ==
- List of bridges on the National Register of Historic Places in Oregon
- National Register of Historic Places listings in Lane County, Oregon
