= Alderwood State Wayside =

State park in Oregon, US

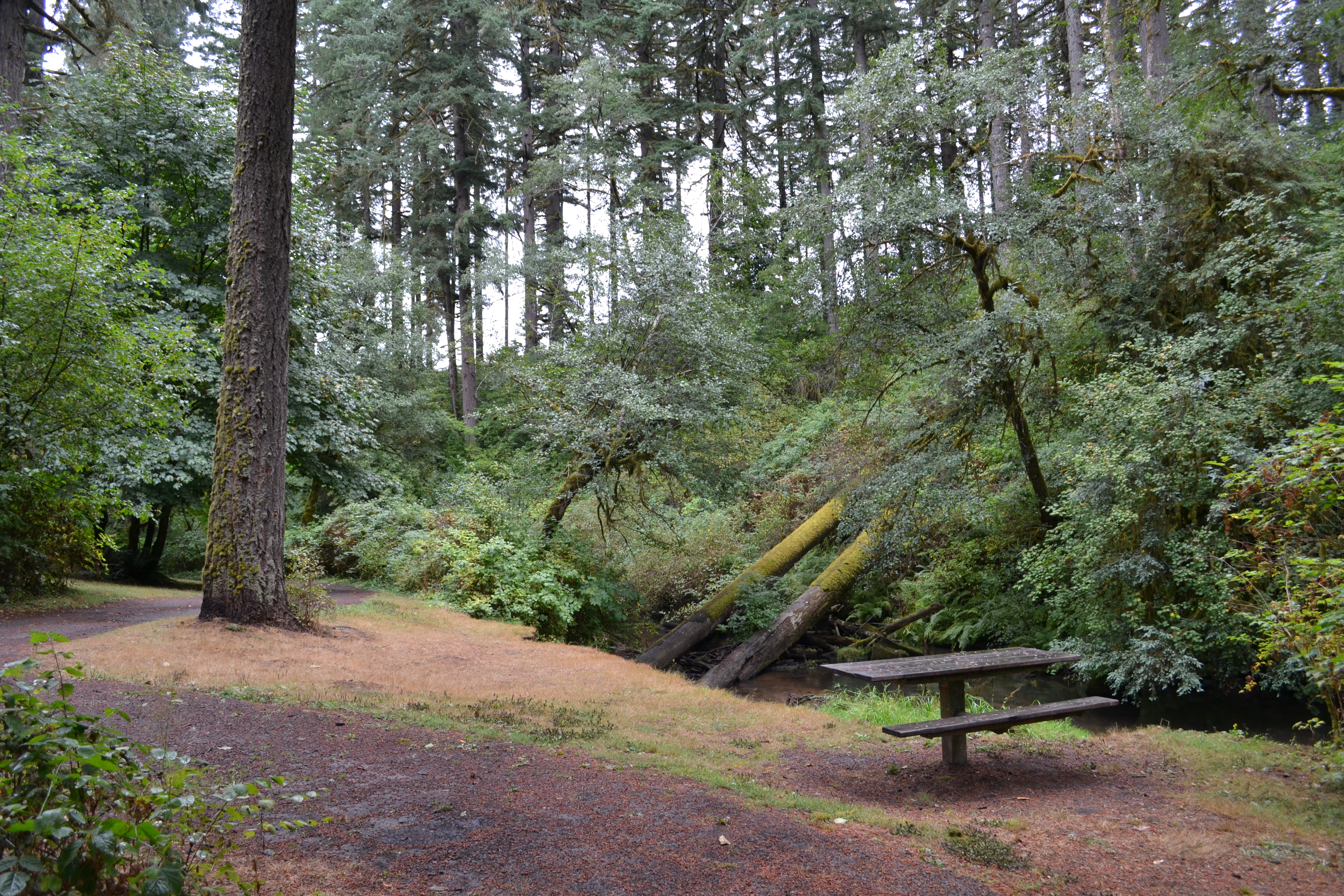

- Location within Oregon Location within the United States
- Interactive map of Alderwood State Wayside
- Type: Public, state
- Location: Lane County, Oregon
- Nearest city: Eugene
- Coordinates: 44°09′18″N 123°25′24″W
- Area: 76.4 acres (30.9 ha)
- Created: 1931–35
- Operator: Oregon Parks and Recreation Department
- Visitors: about 45,000 annually
- Open: Year-round

Alderwood State Wayside is a state park on Oregon Route 36 in the U.S. state of Oregon. Administered by the Oregon Parks and Recreation Department, the day-use wayside covers about 76 acres (31 ha). It is open year-round and attracts about 45,000 visitors annually.

The state acquired the land for the park from Lane County in 1931 and the Civilian Conservation Corps developed the picnic site in about 1935. Amenities include picnic tables, toilets, and a hiking trail along the Long Tom River, which flows through the park.

Flora at Alderwood includes big Douglas firs, Pacific dogwoods and bigleaf maples. Smaller plants, especially lush in spring, include trillium, yellow violets, bleeding hearts, ferns and mosses. Among the fauna observed here are kingfishers and cutthroat trout.

== See also ==
- List of Oregon state parks
