= Deadwood, Oregon =

Unincorporated community in the state of Oregon, United States

- Unincorporated community
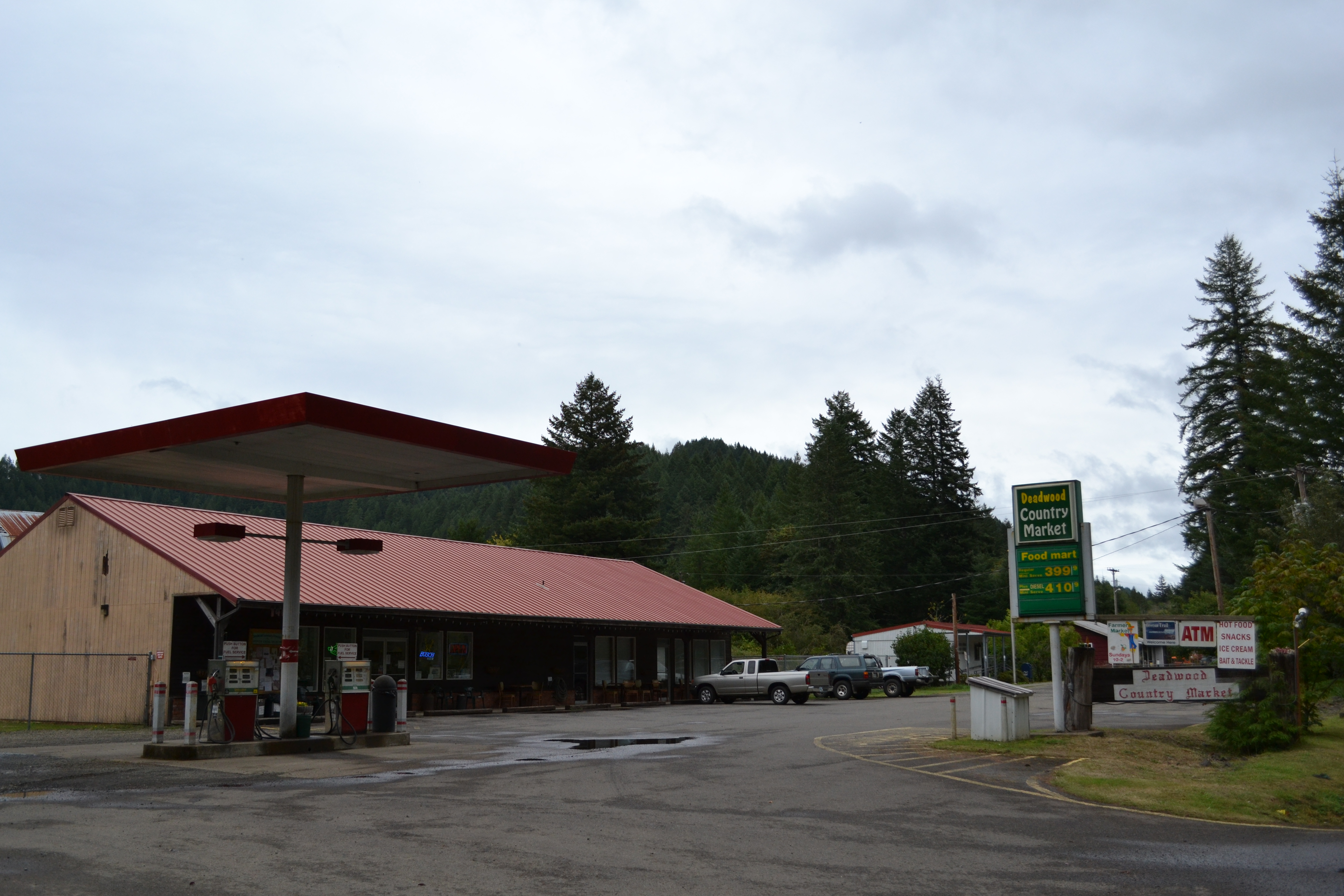
- Store and gas station in Deadwood

- Location within Oregon Location within the United States
- Coordinates: 44°05′44″N 123°45′48″W
- Country: United States
- State: Oregon
- County: Lane
- Elevation: 259 ft (79 m)
- Time zone: UTC-8 (Pacific (PST))
  - Summer (DST): UTC-7 (PDT)
- ZIP code: 97430
- Area codes: 458 and 541
- GNIS feature ID: 1140749

Deadwood is an unincorporated community in Lane County, Oregon, United States. It is located on Oregon Route 36, in the Oregon Coast Range.

Deadwood was named after Deadwood Creek, a tributary of Lake Creek in the Siuslaw River basin. Deadwood Creek was so-named because of the dead timber snags next to its banks, which had resulted from a series of wildfires in the area. Deadwood post office was established in 1884. The post office was discontinued to the community of Greenleaf in 1914, but was reestablished in 1950.

Deadwood is the home of Alpha Farm, an intentional community established in 1972. The farm owned the Alpha Bit, a café and book/gift store in Mapleton but was sold in 2018. Other residents include the artists Ernie and Mary Lou Goertzen who lived in the old Deadwood schoolhouse from 1975.
