= Triangle Lake School =

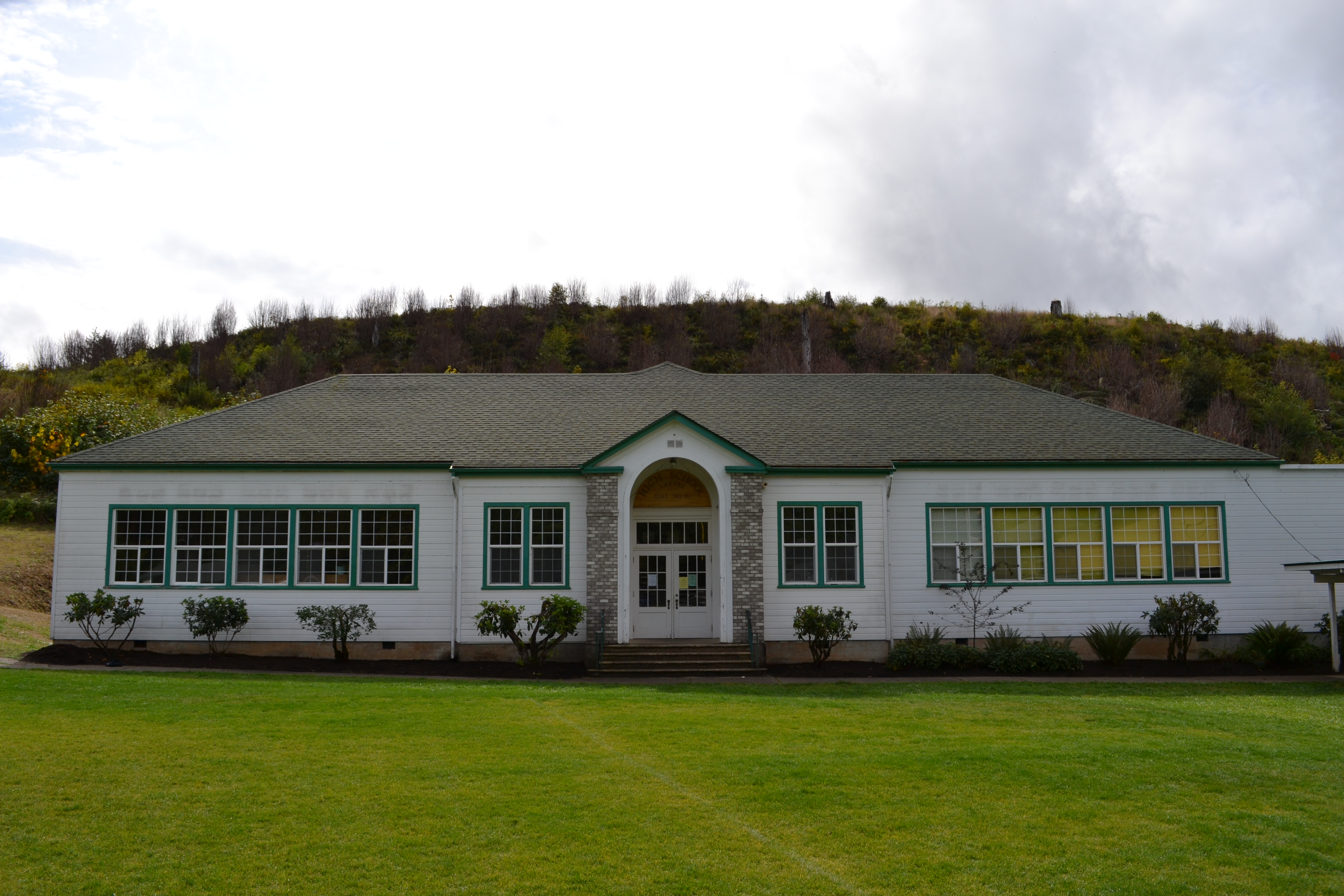

Location
- 20264 Blachly Grange Road; Blachly, (Lane County), Oregon 97412; United States; 44.195328°N 123.545417°W

Information
- Type: Public
- School district: Blachly School District
- Principal: Brittany Bottensek
- Grades: K-12
- Enrollment: 399 (2023–2024)
- Colors: Green and gold
- Athletics conference: OSAA Mountain West League 1A-3
- Mascot: Laker
- Team name: Lakers
- Newspaper: West Lane News
- Website: www.blachly.k12.or.us

Triangle Lake Charter School, formerly known as Triangle Lake School, is a K-12 public school in Blachly, Oregon, United States. It is the only school in the Blachly School District. In 2006 the school earned an "exceptional" rating from the Oregon Department of Education at all levels: elementary, middle school and high school. In April 2010, the Triangle Lake School Board of Directors voted to accept the proposal of the Triangle Lake Charter School Committee to make the school a charter school. From the 2010-11 school year, it has been Triangle Lake Charter School. The school has 14 students to every teacher, five students fewer than the state average.

== Academics ==
In 2008, of nine seniors, seven (78%) graduated and received a high school diploma, and two dropped out.

== Demographics ==
The school has 200 students and 11 teachers. In the 2009 school year, the Blachly School District had 11 students classified as homeless by the Department of Education, or 8.4% of students in the district. The student population is 88% white, 6% Hispanic, 2% American Indian/Native Alaskan, 1% Pacific Islander, <1% Black, and 2% multiracial.

== Going charter ==
Triangle Lake School became Triangle Lake Charter School in the 2010-11 school year. The charter allows students who live out-of-district to attend the school. More hands-on curriculum and field trips will be added to the school's education plan. The charter board hoped that the new status would allow the school to better support students in their chosen fields. Along with the Triangle Lake School Board of Directors, the Triangle Lake Charter School Board will make decisions concerning the future of the school. The charter school received a $500,000 grant to help install the new curriculum program, to be distributed over a period of three years. A new curriculum was to be based more on technology resource, natural resource, and health and fitness classes. A charter school is still a public school.
