= Triangle Lake, Oregon =

Unincorporated community in the state of Oregon, United States

- Unincorporated community
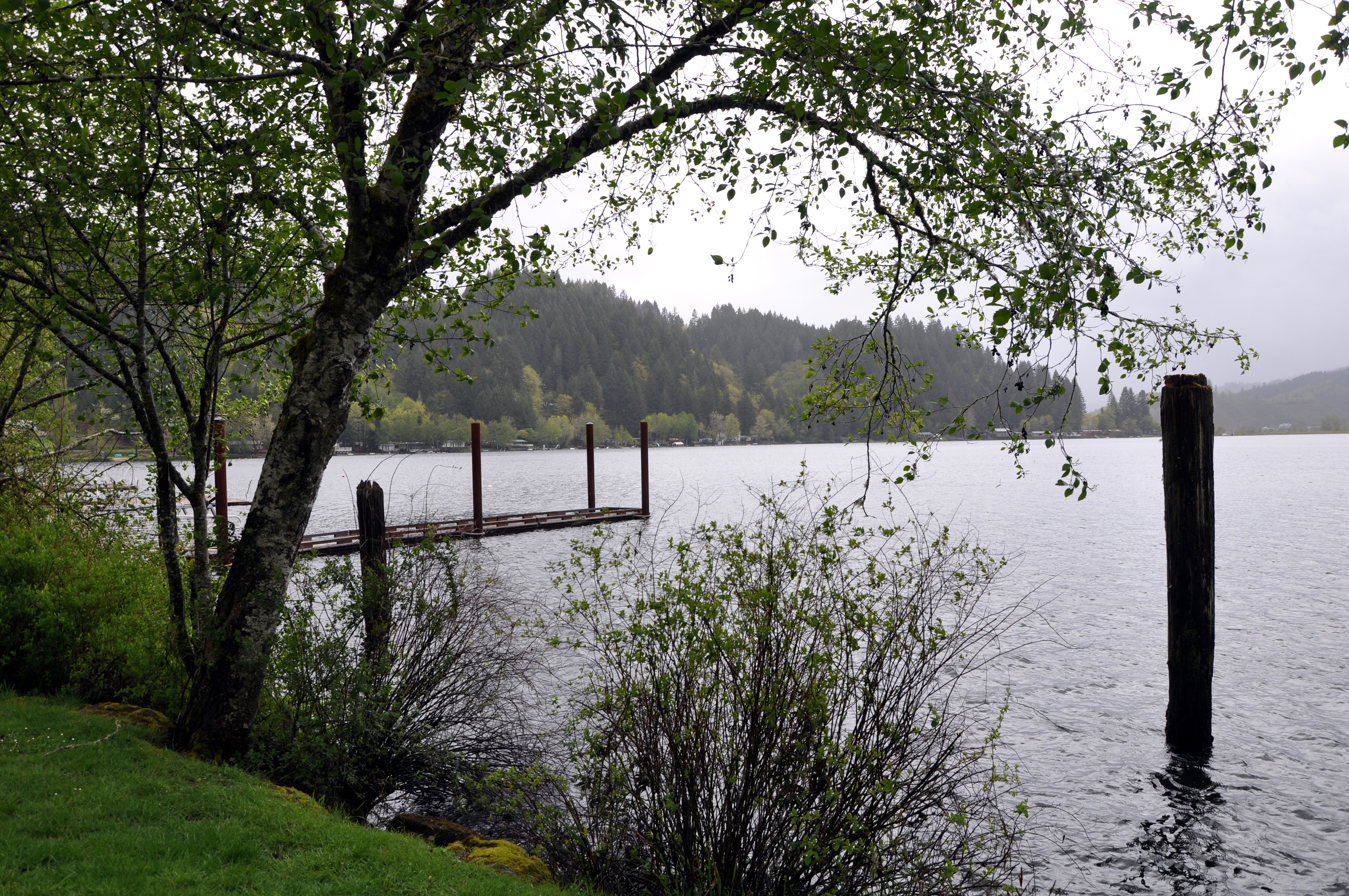
- View from the Lane County park at the lake

- Location within Oregon Location within the United States
- Coordinates: 44°10′14″N 123°34′44″W
- Country: United States
- State: Oregon
- County: Lane
- Elevation: 692 ft (211 m)
- Time zone: UTC-8 (Pacific (PST))
  - Summer (DST): UTC-7 (PDT)
- ZIP code: 97412
- Area codes: 458 and 541
- GNIS feature ID: 1130796

Triangle Lake is an unincorporated community in Lane County, Oregon, United States. The community is approximately 25 miles (40 km) west of Junction City on Oregon Route 36, on the southwest side of the lake of same name. Lake Creek, a tributary of the Siuslaw River, enters and exits the lake. Triangle Lake is closely linked to the unincorporated community of Blachly, on the northeast side of the lake, and the two communities share the K-12 Triangle Lake School, the only school in Blachly School District. Triangle Lake is served by the Blachly post office and the Pioneer Telephone Cooperative.

== Lake ==
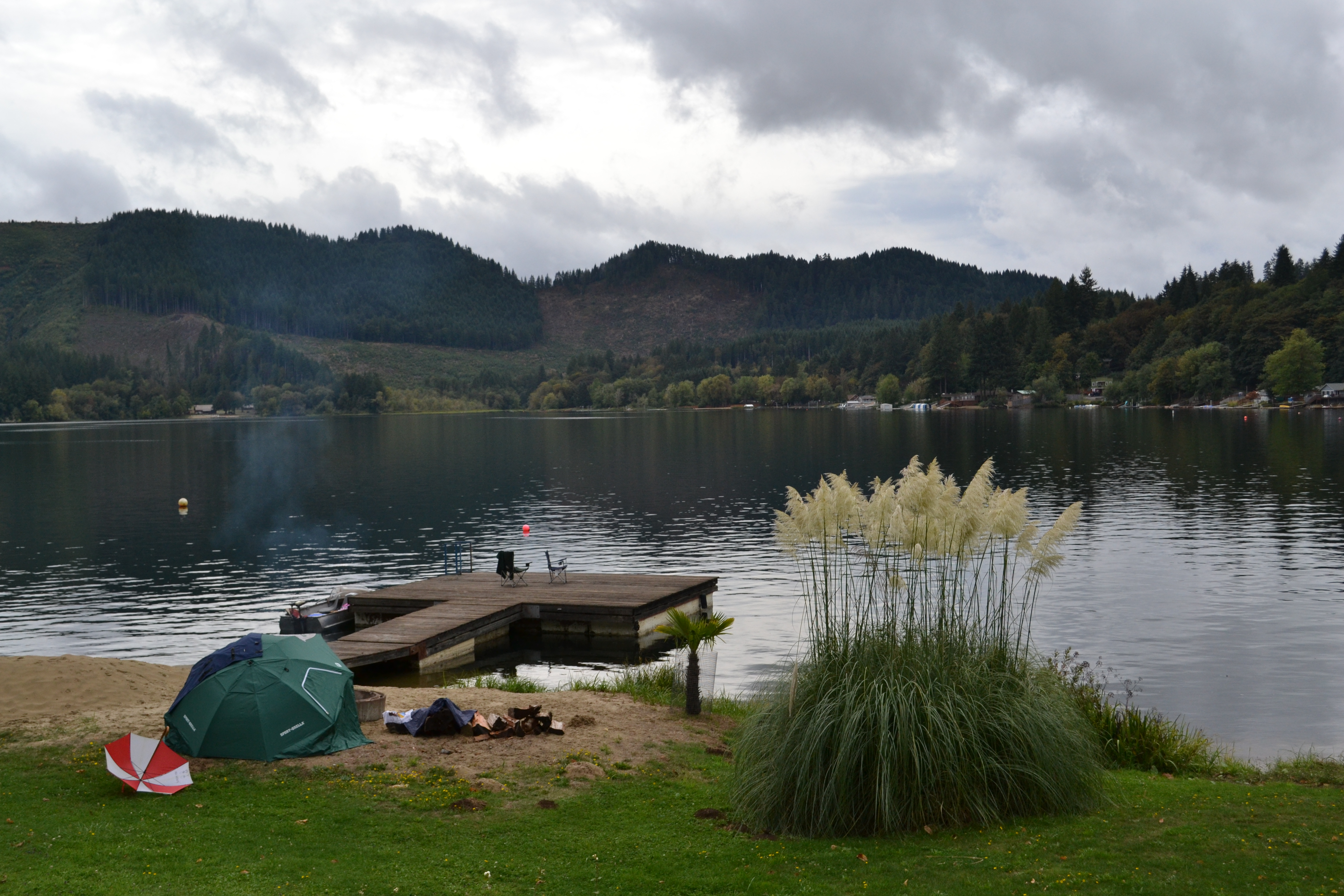
Lakeside campsite

The 293-acre (1.19 km^{2}) lake has had various names over the years, including Loon Lake, Lake of the Woods, and Echo Lake, but the name Triangle Lake (after the lake's shape) became the official name in the early 1900s. Before Fern Ridge Reservoir was completed in 1941, the lake was the most popular local spot for water sports.

Amenities at Triangle Lake County Park include two picnic tables, a boat dock, and toilets. Activities at the lake include boating, swimming, and fishing.

Fish species in the lake, which reaches a depth of 90 feet (27 m), include largemouth bass, Northern pike minnow, shad, bluegill, yellow perch, brown bullhead, kokanee, and cutthroat trout. The kokanee, landlocked sockeye salmon, thrive in the deep water.

== See also ==
- List of lakes in Oregon
