= Henderson, Nebraska =

City in York County, Nebraska, United States

- City
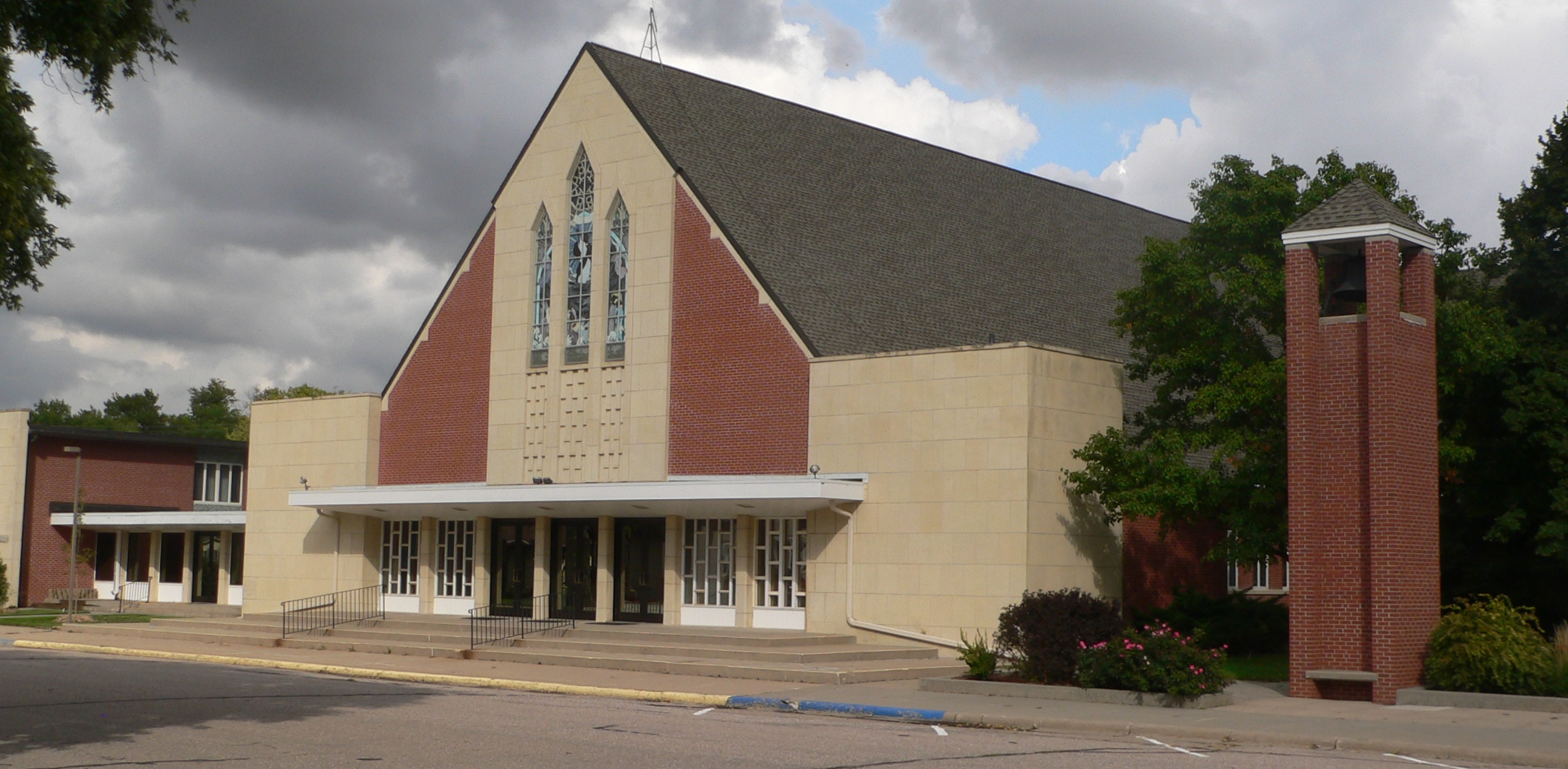
- Bethesda Mennonite Church in Henderson. The majority of the city's residents are descended from 35 Mennonite families who settled the area in 1874.

- Location of Henderson, Nebraska
- Coordinates: 40°46′48″N 97°48′43″W
- Country: United States
- State: Nebraska
- County: York

Area
  - Total: 0.66 sq mi (1.71 km^{2})
  - Land: 0.66 sq mi (1.71 km^{2})
  - Water: 0 sq mi (0.00 km^{2})
- Elevation: 1,719 ft (524 m)

Population (2020)
  - Total: 1,080
  - Density: 1,638.8/sq mi (632.73/km^{2})
- Time zone: UTC-6 (Central (CST))
  - Summer (DST): UTC-5 (CDT)
- ZIP code: 68371
- Area code: 402
- FIPS code: 31-22080
- GNIS feature ID: 2394349
- Website: www.cityofhenderson.org

Henderson is a city in York County, Nebraska, United States. As of the 2020 census, Henderson had a population of 1,080.

== History ==
Henderson was platted in 1887 when the Fremont, Elkhorn & Missouri Valley Railroad was extended to that point. It was named for David Henderson, a pioneer settler. Henderson was incorporated in 1899.

== Geography ==
According to the United States Census Bureau, the city has a total area of 0.56 square miles (1.45 km^{2}), all land.

== Demographics ==
Historical population
| Census | Pop. | Note | %± |
|---|---|---|---|
| 1900 | 208 | | — |
| 1910 | 391 | | 88.0% |
| 1920 | 485 | | 24.0% |
| 1930 | 480 | | −1.0% |
| 1940 | 495 | | 3.1% |
| 1950 | 536 | | 8.3% |
| 1960 | 730 | | 36.2% |
| 1970 | 901 | | 23.4% |
| 1980 | 1,072 | | 19.0% |
| 1990 | 999 | | −6.8% |
| 2000 | 986 | | −1.3% |
| 2010 | 991 | | 0.5% |
| 2020 | 1,080 | | 9.0% |
U.S. Decennial Census

=== 2010 census ===
At the 2010 census there were 991 people in 433 households, including 290 families, in the city. The population density was 1,769.6 inhabitants per square mile (683.2/km^{2}). There were 481 housing units at an average density of 858.9 per square mile (331.6/km^{2}). The racial makeup of the city was 98.2% White, 0.3% African American, 0.3% Native American, 0.1% Asian, 0.8% from other races, and 0.3% from two or more races. Hispanic or Latino of any race were 2.0%.

Of the 433 households 20.8% had children under the age of 18 living with them, 61.2% were married couples living together, 3.9% had a female householder with no husband present, 1.8% had a male householder with no wife present, and 33.0% were non-families. 31.4% of households were one person and 19% were one person aged 65 or older. The average household size was 2.18 and the average family size was 2.66.

The median age was 52.8 years. 20.6% of residents were under the age of 18; 4.5% were between the ages of 18 and 24; 17.3% were from 25 to 44; 25.1% were from 45 to 64; and 32.4% were 65 or older. The gender makeup of the city was 45.4% male and 54.6% female.

=== 2000 census ===
At the 2000 census, there were 986 people in 417 households, including 293 families, in the city. The population density was 1,791.4 inhabitants per square mile (691.7/km^{2}). There were 453 housing units at an average density of 823.0 per square mile (317.8/km^{2}). The racial makeup of the city was 99.49% White, 0.20% Native American and 0.30% Asian.

Of the 417 households 23.5% had children under the age of 18 living with them, 65.7% were married couples living together, 3.6% had a female householder with no husband present, and 29.7% were non-families. 29.0% of households were one person and 18.5% were one person aged 65 or older. The average household size was 2.18 and the average family size was 2.67.

The age distribution was 20.0% under the age of 18, 4.4% from 18 to 24, 18.3% from 25 to 44, 21.8% from 45 to 64, and 35.6% 65 or older. The median age was 50 years. For every 100 females, there were 84.6 males. For every 100 females age 18 and over, there were 80.5 males.

The median household income was $37,321, and the median family income was $43,333. Males had a median income of $31,950 versus $20,288 for females. The per capita income for the city was $19,689. About 3.1% of families and 5.7% of the population were below the poverty line, including 4.8% of those under age 18 and 5.0% of those age 65 or over.

== See also ==
- List of municipalities in Nebraska
