= Swisshome, Oregon =

Unincorporated community in the state of Oregon, United States

- Unincorporated community
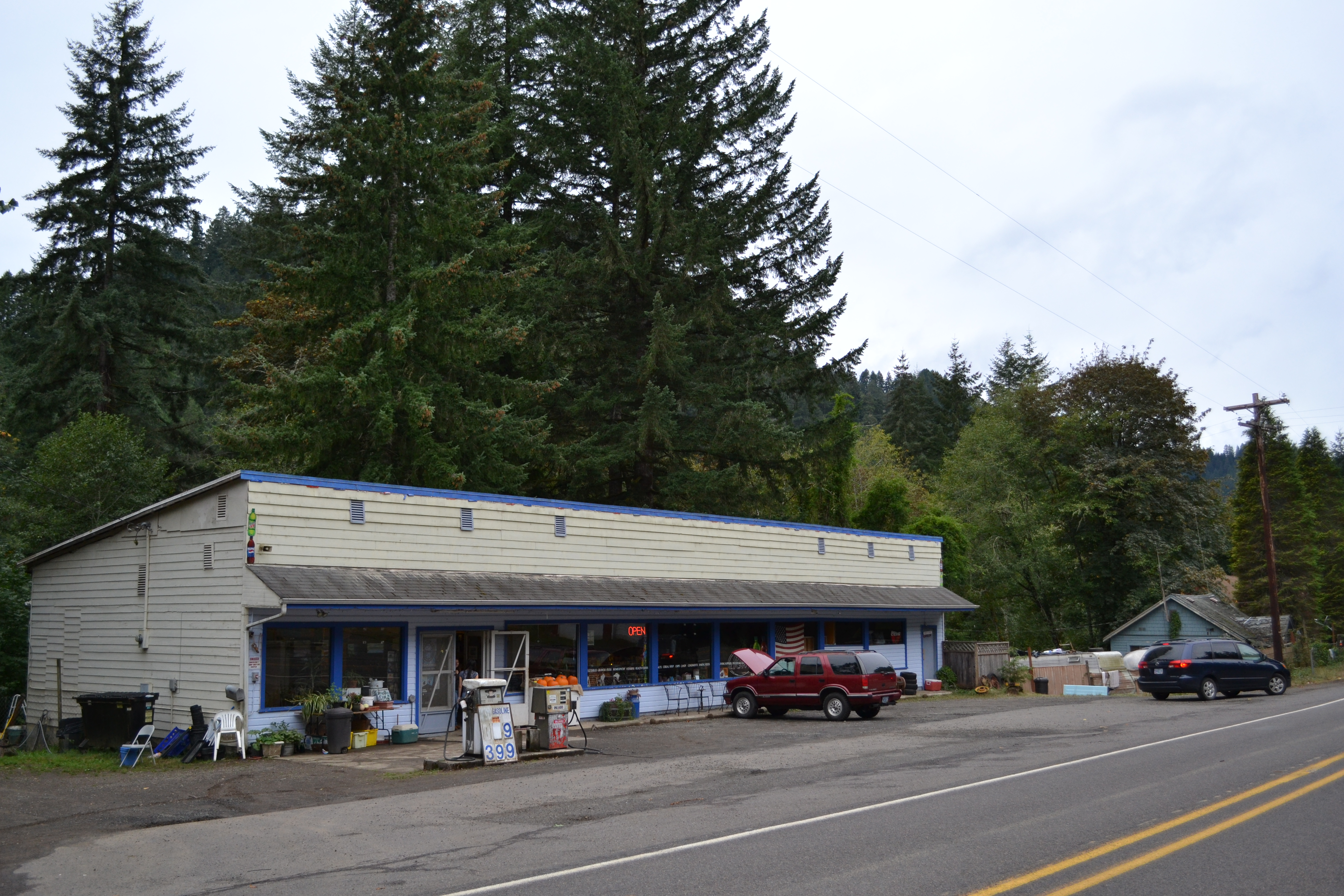
- General store/service station on Route 36

- Location within Oregon Location within the United States
- Coordinates: 44°03′28″N 123°47′57″W
- Country: United States
- State: Oregon
- County: Lane
- Elevation: 213 ft (65 m)
- Time zone: UTC-8 (Pacific (PST))
  - Summer (DST): UTC-7 (PDT)
- GNIS feature ID: 1150791

Swisshome is an unincorporated community in Lane County, in the U.S. state of Oregon. It is located along the Siuslaw River northeast of Mapleton, on Oregon Route 36.

The community's name was conferred in honor of a local Swiss family. Swisshome post office was established in 1902. The Coos Bay Rail Link passes through Swisshome.

The Deadwood Creek Bridge and the Wildcat Creek Bridge near Swisshome are two covered bridges that are on the National Register of Historic Places.
