= Blachly, Oregon =

Unincorporated community in the state of Oregon, United States

- Unincorporated community
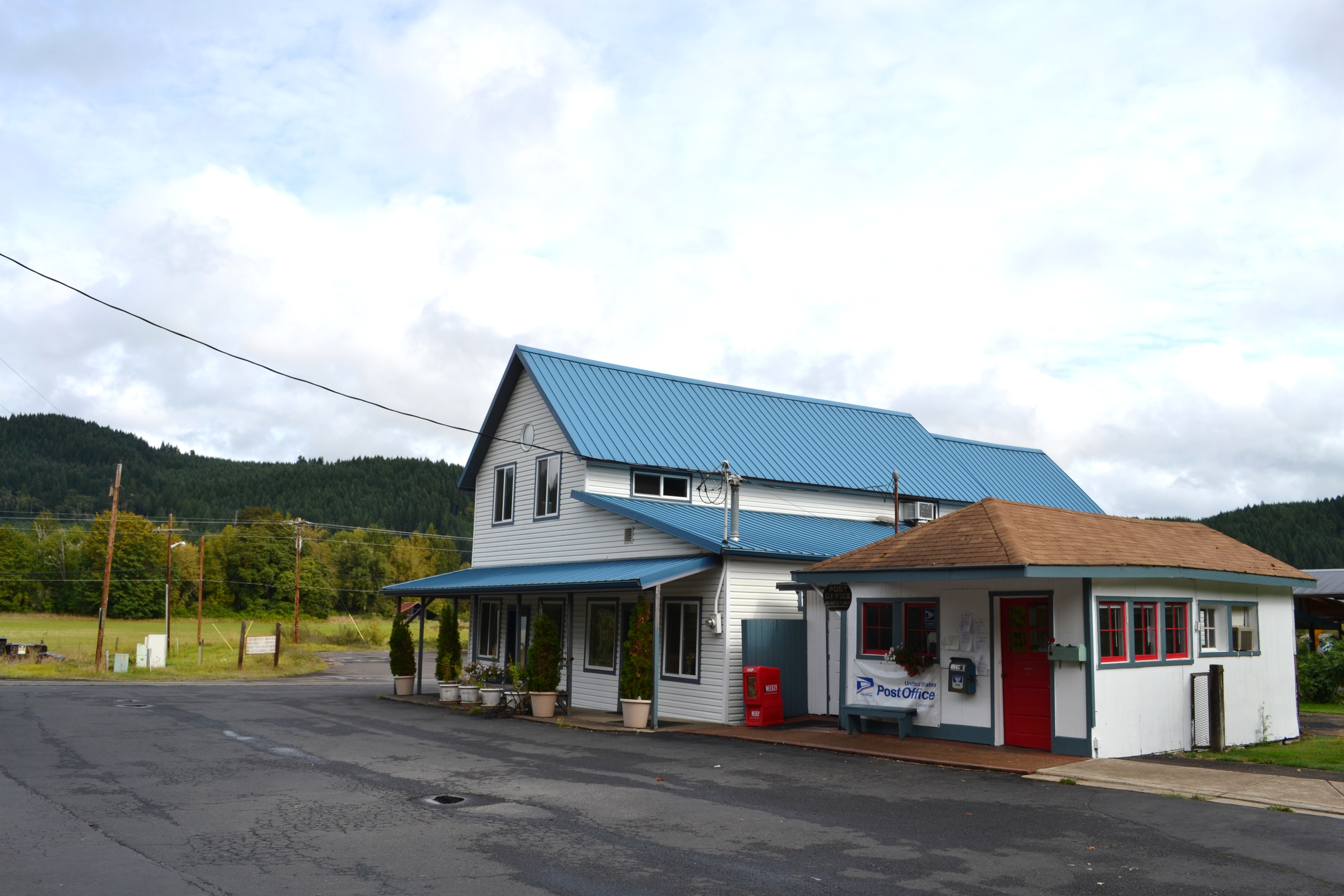

- Location within Oregon Location within the United States
- Coordinates: 44°11′41″N 123°32′06″W
- Country: United States
- State: Oregon
- County: Lane
- Elevation: 722 ft (220 m)
- Time zone: UTC-8 (Pacific (PST))
  - Summer (DST): UTC-7 (PDT)
- ZIP codes: 97412
- Area code: 541
- GNIS feature ID: 1136070

Blachly is an unincorporated community in Lane County, Oregon, United States, on Oregon Route 36 in the Coast Range. Blachly lies along Lake Creek, about 3 miles (5 km) from Triangle Lake.

Before the Blachly post office was established in 1892, area residents received their mail at the now-closed Franklin post office. The Blachly office was named for local resident William Blachly, who arrived in Oregon in 1854 from Illinois when he was 10 years old. He died on February 16, 1934.

Blachly is served by the K–12 Triangle Lake School, the only school in Blachly School District.

Marty Wilde, representative for District 11 in the Oregon House of Representatives as of 2021, grew up on a farm near Blachly.
