= Oregon Route 36 =

State highway in Lane County, Oregon, US

Oregon Route 36
- Route 36 highlighted in red

Route information
- Maintained by ODOT
- Length: 51.58 mi (83.01 km)
- Component highways: Mapleton–Junction City Highway No. 229

Major junctions
- West end: OR 126 in Mapleton
- East end: OR 99 near Junction City

Location
- Country: United States
- State: Oregon
- Counties: Lane

Highway system
- Oregon Highways; Interstate; US; State; Named; Scenic
← OR 35	→ OR 37

Oregon Route 36 is an Oregon state highway that runs between the city of Mapleton in the Oregon Coast Range, and the city of Junction City in the Willamette Valley. OR 36 traverses the Mapleton–Junction City Highway No. 229 of the Oregon state highway system. The entire route of the highway is located within Lane County.

== Route description ==
The western terminus of Oregon Route 36 is a junction with Oregon Route 126 in Mapleton. From Mapleton, the route heads due north through the Coast Range, then heads due east, following the course of the Siuslaw River. At the community of Swisshome it departs from the river, passing through the communities of Deadwood and Greenleaf, Triangle Lake, Blachly and Low Pass. As it emerges from the mountains, it passes through the Alderwood State Wayside, and descends into the Willamette Valley. It then passes through the communities of Goldson and Cheshire before ending just south of Junction City at an intersection with Oregon Route 99.

== History ==
The highway was originally part of U.S. Route 28 and was the primary route between the Oregon Coast and the Eugene area; however, because of its winding nature, it was not suitable for high volumes of traffic. The commercial importance of the highway diminished greatly when a more direct route between Mapleton and Eugene—the present day alignment of Oregon Route 126—was constructed.

== Major intersections ==
Milepoints are as reported by ODOT and do not necessarily reflect current mileage. Z indicates overlapping mileage due to construction longer than established route, and – indicates negative mileage behind established beginning point. Segments that are locally maintained may be omitted. For routes traversing multiple named state highways, each milepoint is preceded by the corresponding state highway number. The entire route is in Lane County.

Location	Milepoint	Destinations	Notes
	0.01	OR 126 – Veneta, Eugene, Florence	
	33.30	Low Pass summit, elevation 1,022 feet (312 m)	
Burp Hollow	37.86	Long Tom River	
	38.39	Long Tom River	
	45.95	Territorial Highway (OR 200 south) – Elmira, Veneta	Western end of concurrency with OR 200
Cheshire	47.41	Territorial Highway (OR 200 north)	Eastern end of concurrency with OR 200
	47.81	Long Tom River	
	51.59	OR 99 – Junction City, Eugene	
1.000 mi = 1.609 km; 1.000 km = 0.621 mi: Concurrency terminus
