= Mapleton, Oregon =

Unincorporated community in the state of Oregon, United States

- Census-designated place
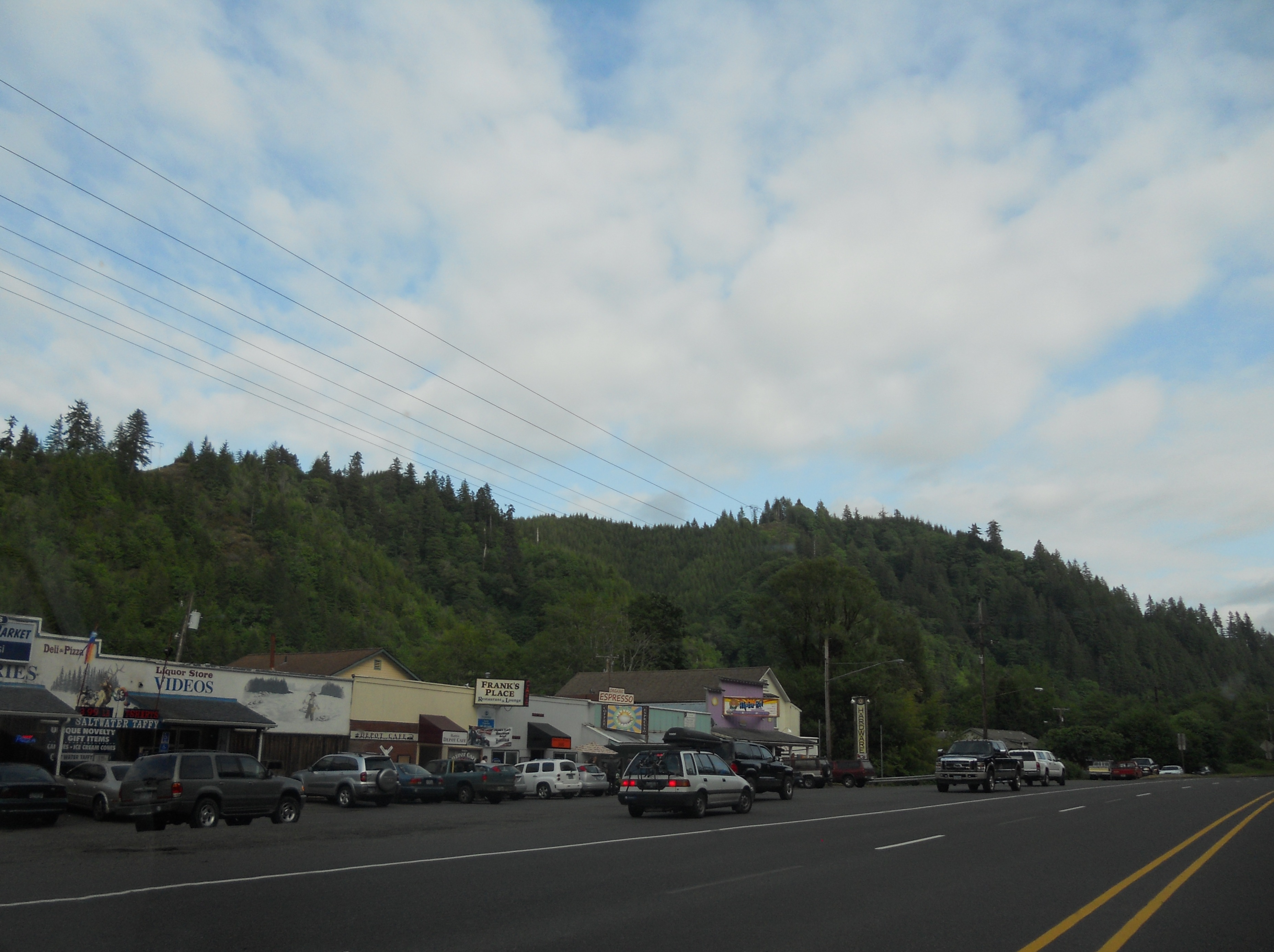

- Location within Oregon Location within the United States
- Coordinates: 44°01′57″N 123°51′40″W
- Country: United States
- State: Oregon
- County: Lane
- Established: 1886

Area
  - Total: 0.96 sq mi (2.49 km^{2})
  - Land: 0.90 sq mi (2.33 km^{2})
  - Water: 0.062 sq mi (0.16 km^{2})
- Elevation: 95 ft (29 m)

Population (2020)
  - Total: 493
  - Density: 548.2/sq mi (211.65/km^{2})
- Time zone: UTC-8 (Pacific (PST))
  - Summer (DST): UTC-7 (PDT)
- ZIP code: 97453
- Area codes: 541 and 458
- FIPS code: 41-45750
- GNIS feature ID: 2812886

Mapleton is an unincorporated community and census-designated place (CDP) in Lane County, Oregon, United States. It is located on Oregon Route 126 and the Siuslaw River, 45 miles (72 km) west of Eugene and 15 miles (24 km) east of Florence. It is also the western terminus of Oregon Route 36. As of the 2020 census, Mapleton had a population of 493.

== History ==
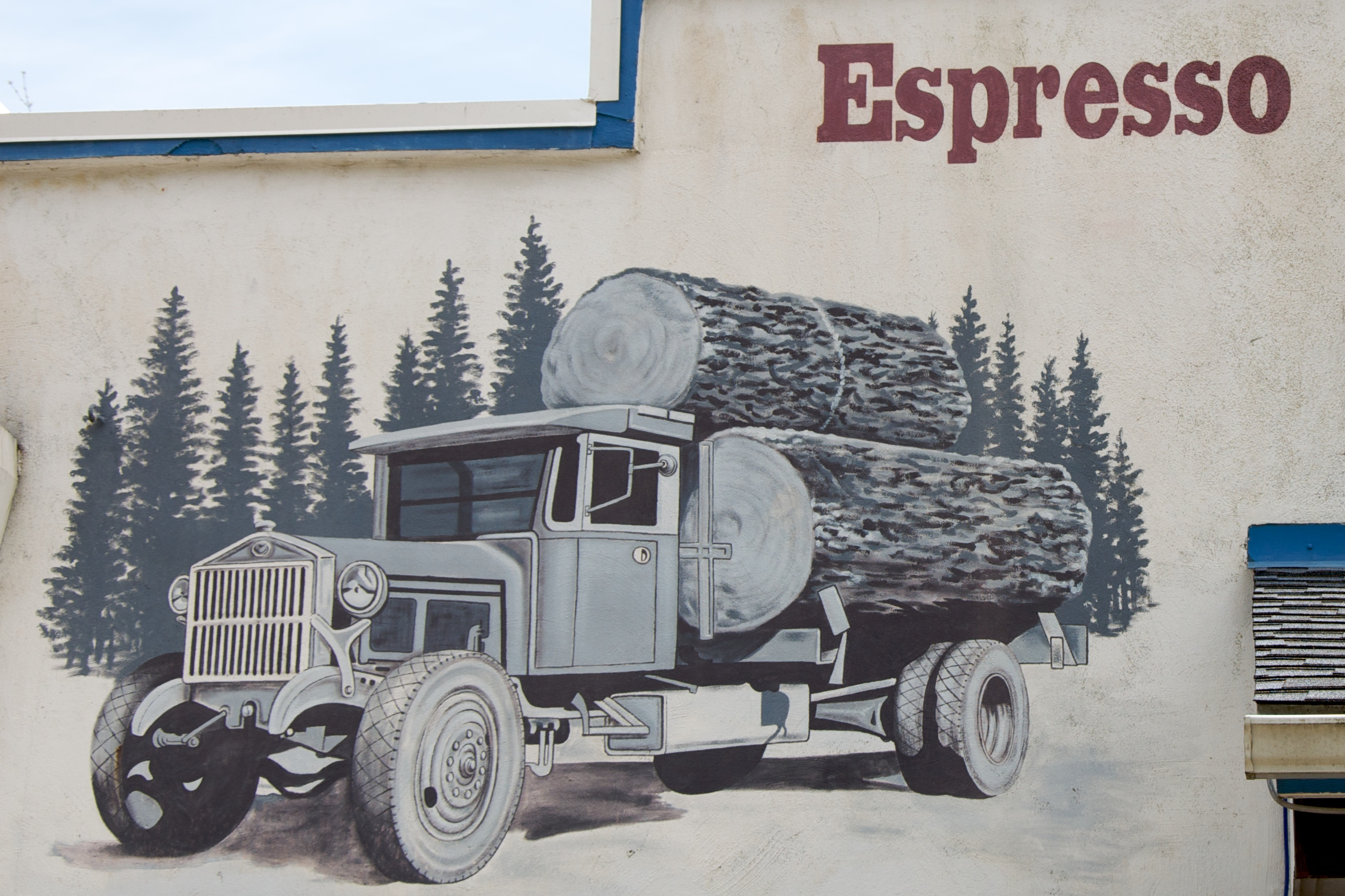
Sign on coffee shop in Mapleton

Mapleton was likely named by Julia Ann "Grandma" Bean for the abundance of Bigleaf Maple trees in the area. Grandma Bean's husband was Obediah Roberts Bean, and their eldest child was judge Robert S. Bean. Pioneers of 1852, the Beans moved to the Mapleton area in 1886 and the town was named shortly thereafter. There was a post office called Seaton established north of the locality in 1885, and when it moved to the Mapleton area in 1889, Mrs. Bean became postmaster. The post office was renamed Mapleton to match the town in 1896.

== Climate ==
This region experiences warm (but not hot) and dry summers. According to the Köppen Climate Classification system, Mapleton has a warm-summer Mediterranean climate, abbreviated Csb on climate maps.

Climate data for Mapleton, Oregon (1991–2020 normals, extremes 1924–present)
Month	Jan	Feb	Mar	Apr	May	Jun	Jul	Aug	Sep	Oct	Nov	Dec	Year
Record high °F (°C)	68 (20)	69 (21)	80 (27)	87 (31)	99 (37)	109 (43)	102 (39)	105 (41)	98 (37)	88 (31)	72 (22)	64 (18)	109 (43)
Mean maximum °F (°C)	59.5 (15.3)	63.8 (17.7)	69.5 (20.8)	78.7 (25.9)	86.2 (30.1)	87.3 (30.7)	93.7 (34.3)	95.5 (35.3)	91.0 (32.8)	76.0 (24.4)	65.7 (18.7)	59.6 (15.3)	97.5 (36.4)
Mean daily maximum °F (°C)	52.0 (11.1)	54.8 (12.7)	58.2 (14.6)	62.3 (16.8)	67.9 (19.9)	72.8 (22.7)	79.6 (26.4)	80.3 (26.8)	76.6 (24.8)	65.7 (18.7)	56.1 (13.4)	50.4 (10.2)	64.7 (18.2)
Daily mean °F (°C)	46.4 (8.0)	47.9 (8.8)	50.0 (10.0)	53.1 (11.7)	57.8 (14.3)	62.0 (16.7)	66.8 (19.3)	67.4 (19.7)	64.0 (17.8)	56.6 (13.7)	49.9 (9.9)	45.4 (7.4)	55.6 (13.1)
Mean daily minimum °F (°C)	40.9 (4.9)	41.1 (5.1)	41.8 (5.4)	43.9 (6.6)	47.8 (8.8)	51.1 (10.6)	53.9 (12.2)	54.5 (12.5)	51.3 (10.7)	47.4 (8.6)	43.8 (6.6)	40.4 (4.7)	46.5 (8.1)
Mean minimum °F (°C)	29.8 (−1.2)	30.3 (−0.9)	33.1 (0.6)	34.8 (1.6)	37.7 (3.2)	43.7 (6.5)	47.2 (8.4)	46.1 (7.8)	42.6 (5.9)	37.8 (3.2)	32.9 (0.5)	28.3 (−2.1)	25.1 (−3.8)
Record low °F (°C)	19 (−7)	17 (−8)	26 (−3)	27 (−3)	29 (−2)	38 (3)	40 (4)	39 (4)	34 (1)	22 (−6)	19 (−7)	8 (−13)	8 (−13)
Average precipitation inches (mm)	13.41 (341)	9.79 (249)	10.22 (260)	7.22 (183)	3.88 (99)	2.39 (61)	0.46 (12)	0.70 (18)	2.09 (53)	6.25 (159)	12.32 (313)	15.25 (387)	83.98 (2,133)
Average precipitation days (≥ 0.01 in)	20.0	18.5	24.2	19.6	13.7	13.0	3.3	3.6	6.6	13.6	21.1	19.8	177.0
Source: NOAA

== Demographics ==
Historical population
Census	Pop.	Note	%±
2020	493		—
U.S. Decennial Census
