= Cheshire, Oregon =

Unincorporated community in Oregon, United States

- Census-designated place
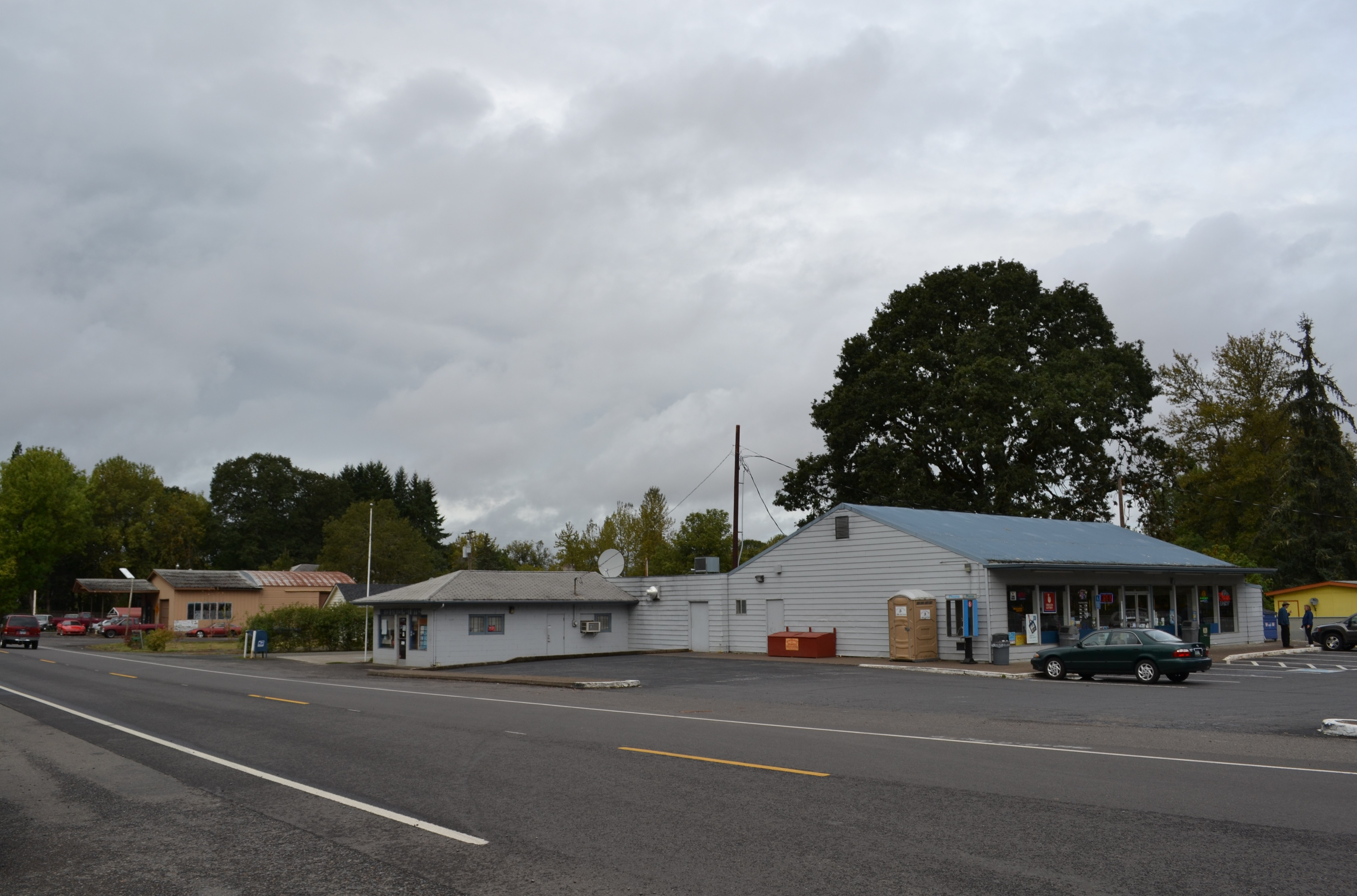
- Store and post office in Cheshire

- Location within Oregon Location within the United States
- Coordinates: 44°11′24″N 123°17′00″W
- Country: United States
- State: Oregon
- County: Lane

Area
  - Total: 0.47 sq mi (1.22 km^{2})
  - Land: 0.47 sq mi (1.22 km^{2})
  - Water: 0 sq mi (0.00 km^{2})
- Elevation: 325 ft (99 m)

Population (2020)
  - Total: 329
  - Density: 699.8/sq mi (270.18/km^{2})
- Time zone: UTC-8 (Pacific (PST))
  - Summer (DST): UTC-7 (PDT)
- FIPS code: 41-13000
- GNIS feature ID: 2812888

Cheshire is an unincorporated community and census-designated place (CDP) in Lane County, Oregon, United States. As of the 2020 census, Cheshire had a population of 329. It is located near the Long Tom River and is southwest of Junction City on Oregon Route 36.

== History ==
Cheshire was a station on the Southern Pacific Railroad line platted in 1913 and originally named Hubert. This name caused confusion with another station on the line, Huber, however, so the railroad company changed the name to Cheshire in 1914. The Cheshire post office was established the same year. Both "Hubert" and "Cheshire" were names chosen to honor James Hubert Cheshire, a favorite child of the people in the area.

== Demographics ==
Historical population
Census	Pop.	Note	%±
2020	329		—
U.S. Decennial Census

== Business ==
Today, Cheshire's principal landmarks are a Dari Mart convenience store and a post office serving the 97419 zip code.

== Notable people ==
- Dick Shane (1932–2014) – actor and stuntman
