= List of rivers of Oregon =

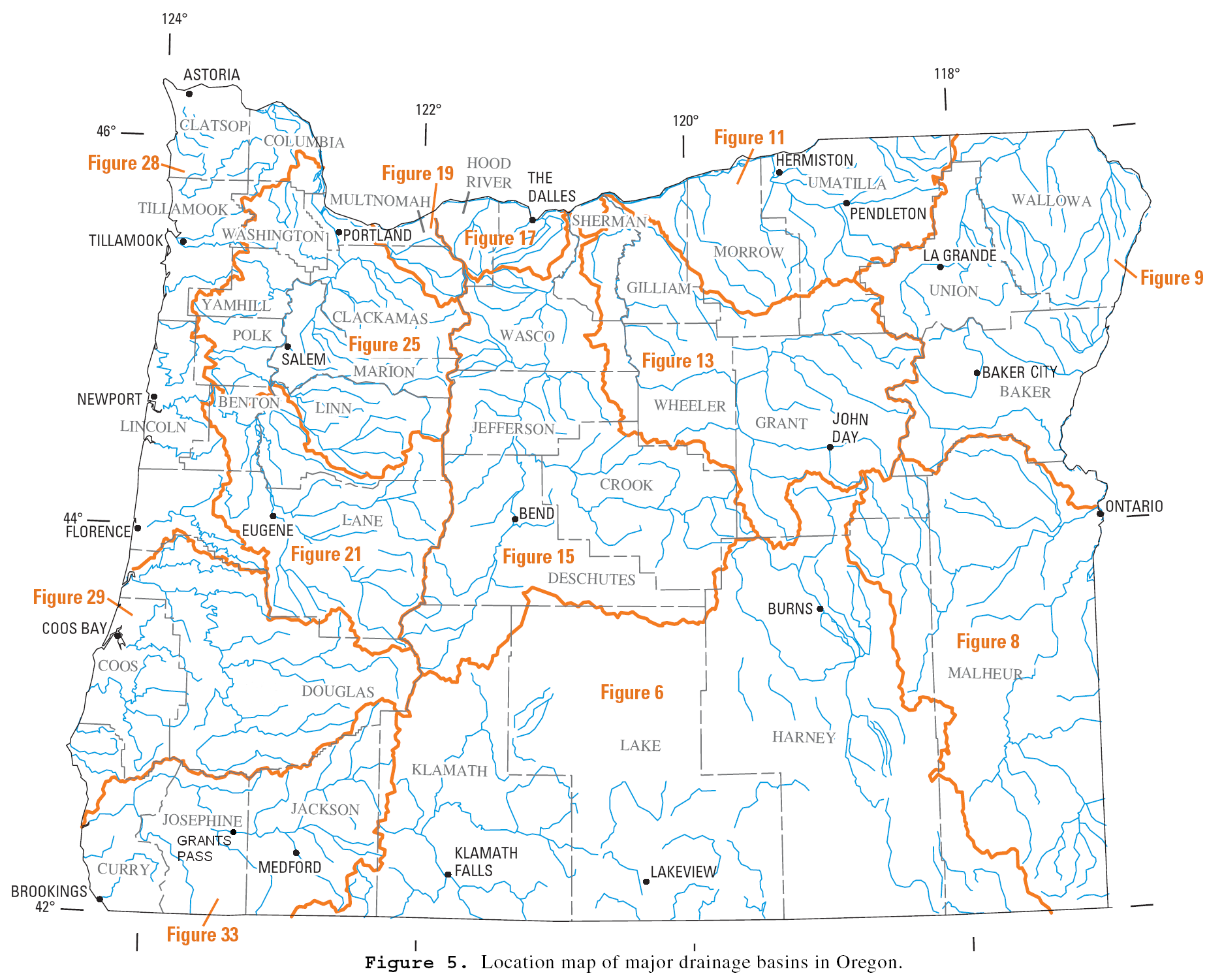
Overview of Oregon river drainage basins

This is a partial listing of rivers in the state of Oregon, United States. This list of Oregon rivers is organized alphabetically and by tributary structure. The list may also include streams known as creeks, brooks, forks, branches and prongs, as well as sloughs and channels.

A list of rivers of the Americas and a list of Pacific Ocean coast rivers of the Americas are also available, as is a list of Oregon lakes.

== Alphabetically ==
- Abiqua Creek
- Agency Creek (South Yamhill River)
- Alsea River
- Amazon Creek
- Ana River
- Applegate River
- Ash Creek
- Ashland Creek
- Balch Creek
- Bear Creek
- Big Butte Creek
- Big Marsh Creek
- Big River
- Birch Creek
- Blue River
- Breitenbush River
- Bridge Creek (John Day River)
- Buck Hollow River
- Bull Run River
- Bully Creek
- Burnt River
- Butte Creek
- Calapooia River
- Catherine Creek
- Chetco River
- Chewaucan River
- Clackamas River
- Clatskanie River
- Clear Fork
- Clearwater River
- Coast Fork Willamette River
- Collawash River
- Columbia River
- Columbia Slough
- Coos River
- Coquille River
- Crabtree Creek
- Crescent Creek
- Crooked River
- Cultus River
- D River
- Dead Indian Creek
- Dead River
- Deschutes River
- Dog River
- Donner und Blitzen River
- Dry River
- Dry Well Creek
- East Fork Coquille River
- East Fork Hood River
- East Fork Quinn River
- East Fork Salmon River
- East Fork Silvies River
- East Fork South Fork McKenzie River
- Elk River
- Elkhorn Creek
- Fall River
- Fanno Creek
- Five Rivers
- French Pete Creek
- Gales Creek
- Gilbert River
- Grande Ronde River
- Green River
- Hood River
- Illinois River
- Imnaha River
- John Day River (north central Oregon)
- John Day River (Clatsop County)
- Johnson Creek
- Joseph Creek
- Kellogg Creek
- Kiger Creek
- Kings River
- Kilchis River
- Klamath River
- Klaskanine River
- Lake Fork West Owyhee River
- Lewis and Clark River
- Link River
- Little Applegate River
- Little Blitzen River
- Little Butte Creek
- Little Chetco River
- Little Clatskanie River
- Little Deschutes River
- Little Luckiamute River
- Little Malheur River
- Little Minam River
- Little Nestucca River
- Little North Santiam River
- Little Owyhee River
- Little Pudding River
- Little River (Coast Fork Willamette River)
- Little River (North Umpqua River)
- Little Sandy River
- Little Walla Walla River
- Little Wallooskee River
- Little Wildhorse Creek
- Little Willamette River
- Little Yaquina River
- Long Tom River
- Lookingglass Creek
- Lost River
- Lostine River
- Luckiamute River
- Malheur River
- Marys River
- McKenzie River
- Metolius River
- Metolius Springs
- Miami River
- Middle Fork Coquille River
- Middle Fork Hood River
- Middle Fork John Day River
- Middle Fork Owyhee River
- Middle Fork Rogue River
- Middle Fork Willamette River
- Middle Santiam River
- Mill Creek
- Miller Creek
- Millicoma River
- Minam River
- Mohawk River
- Molalla River
- Muddy Fork
- Multnomah Channel
- Necanicum River
- Nehalem River
- Neskowin Creek
- Nestucca River
- New River
- North Fork Alsea River
- North Fork Breitenbush River
- North Fork Bull Run River
- North Fork Clackamas River
- North Fork Coquille River
- North Fork Crooked River
- North Fork John Day River
- North Fork Malheur River
- North Fork Middle Fork Willamette River
- North Fork Owyhee River
- North Fork Siuslaw River
- North Fork Smith River (Umpqua River)
- North Fork Smith River (California)
- North Fork Sprague River
- North Fork Umatilla River
- North Powder River
- North Santiam River
- North Umpqua River
- North Yamhill River
- Owyhee River
- Pistol River
- Powder River
- Pudding River
- Quartzville Creek
- Red River
- Roaring River (Clackamas River)
- Roaring River (Crabtree Creek)
- Roaring River (South Fork McKenzie River)
- Rogue River (Oregon)
- Rogue River (South Yamhill River)
- Row River
- Salmon River (Clackamas County, Oregon)
- Salmon River (Lincoln County, Oregon)
- Salmonberry River
- Salt Creek (Middle Fork Willamette River)
- Sandy River
- Santiam River
- Scoggins Creek
- Shitepoke Creek
- Shitten Creek
- Siletz River
- Siltcoos River
- Silver Creek (Oregon)
- Silvies River
- Siuslaw River
- Sixes River
- Skipanon River
- Smith River (McKenzie River)
- Smith River (Umpqua River)
- Snake River
- South Fork Alsea River
- South Fork Breitenbush River
- South Fork Bull Run River
- South Fork Burnt River
- South Fork Clackamas River
- South Fork Coos River
- South Fork Coquille River
- South Fork Crooked River
- South Fork John Day River
- South Fork Malheur River
- South Fork McKenzie River
- South Fork Roaring River
- South Fork Rogue River
- South Fork Salmon River
- South Fork Sprague River
- South Fork Umatilla River
- South Santiam River
- South Umpqua River
- South Yamhill River
- Succor Creek
- Sprague River
- Spring River (Deschutes River)
- Spring River (North Umpqua River)
- Steamboat Creek
- Sycan River
- Tenmile Creek (Coos County, Oregon)
- Three Rivers
- Tillamook River
- Trask River
- Treat River
- Tualatin River
- Tumalo Creek
- Tumtum River
- Umatilla River
- Umpqua River
- Walla Walla River
- Wallooskee River
- Wallowa River
- Warm Springs River
- Wenaha River
- West Fork Hood River
- West Fork Salmon River
- West Fork Silvies River
- West Fork Smith River
- West Little Owyhee River
- White River
- Whitewater River
- Whychus Creek
- Wildcat Creek (Siuslaw River)
- Wildhorse Creek
- Willamette River
- Williams River
- Williamson River
- Willow Creek
- Wilson River
- Winchuck River
- Wind River
- Wood River
- Yachats River
- Yamhill River
- Yaquina River
- Youngs River
- Zigzag River

== By tributary structure ==
=== Pacific Ocean ===
List order is north to south if draining into the Pacific Ocean. Tributary order is by increasing distance from the mouth of the river they feed.

- Columbia River
  - Alder Creek
    - Tansy Creek
  - Skipanon River
    - Skipannon Slough
    - Old Skipannon Creek
    - Cullaby Lake
      - Cullaby Slough
        - Cullaby Creek
  - Youngs River
    - Lewis and Clark River
    - Knowland Slough
    - Craig Creek
    - Brown Creek
    - Crosel Creek
    - Wallooskee River
      - Little Wallooskee River
    - Cook Slough
    - Binder Slough
    - Casey Slough
    - Tucker Slough
    - Battle Creek Slough
    - Cooperage Slough
    - Klaskanine River
      - North Fork Klaskanine River
        - North Fork of the North Fork Klaskanine River
        - Middle Fork of the North Fork Klaskanine River
      - South Fork Klaskanine River
        - South Fork of the South Fork Klaskanine River
    - Moosmoos Creek
    - Wawa Creek
    - Bayney Creek
    - Rock Creek
    - Osgood Creek
    - Fox Creek
    - South Fork Youngs River
    - Fall Creek
  - John Day River
    - Jack Creek
  - Eskeline Creek
  - Marys Creek
  - Hillcrest Creek
    - Ferris Creek
      - Little Ferris Creek
  - Big Creek
    - Little Creek
      - Carmen Creek
    - Mill Creek
    - Pigpen Creek
    - Mud Creek
    - Coon Creek
    - Elk Creek
  - Fertile Valley Creek
    - Dogwood Creek
  - Clatskanie River
    - Beaver Slough
    - Fall Creek
    - Conyers Creek
    - Merril Creek
    - Perkins Creek
    - Keystone Creek
    - Langfeld Creek
    - Vonberg Creek
    - Miller Creek
    - Page Creek
    - Carcus Creek
    - North Fork
    - Falls Creek
    - Buck Creek
    - Little Clatskanie River
  - Multnomah Channel
    - Cunningham Slough
    - Scappoose Creek
      - Milton Creek
        - Perry Creek
        - Dart Creek
        - Cox Creek
        - Salmon Creek
        - Smith Creek
        - Apilton Creek
          - Salmonberry Creek
      - McNulty Creek
        - North Fork McNulty Creek
      - Warren Creek
      - Honeyman Creek
        - Sly Creek
      - Crooked Creek
      - Teal Creek
      - North Scappoose Creek
        - Deep Creek
        - Fall Creek
        - Alder Creek
        - Brush Creek
        - Cedar Creek
        - Lizzie Creek
        - Mollenhour Creek
      - South Scappoose Creek
        - Alder Creek
        - Coal Creek
        - Raymond Creek
        - Salt Creek
          - Mud Creek
        - Wolf Creek
        - Gourlay Creek
        - Lazy Creek
        - Dooly Creek
        - McLafferty Creek
    - Jackson Creek
    - Gilbert River
      - Mud Slough
      - Jack Slough
      - Ash Slough
    - Crane Slough
    - Joy Creek
    - Johns Creek
    - McCarthy Creek
    - Ennis Creek
    - Miller Creek
  - Gee Creek
  - Willamette River
    - Columbia Slough
      - Wilkes Creek
      - Fairview Creek
      - Osborn Creek
    - Doane Creek
    - Saltzman Creek
      - Rocking Chair Creek
    - Balch Creek
    - Tanner Creek
    - Stephens Creek
    - Lewis & Clark Ravine
    - Johnson Creek
      - Crystal Springs Creek
      - Veterans Creek
      - Kelley Creek
        - Mitchell Creek
      - Butler Creek
      - North Fork Johnson Creek
      - Sunshine Creek
      - Badger Creek
    - Kellogg Creek
      - Mount Scott Creek
    - Tryon Creek
      - Nettle Creek
      - Palatine Hill Creek
      - Red Fox Creek
      - Paget Creek
      - Park Creek
      - High Creek
      - East Fork Tryon Creek
      - Fourth Avenue Creek
      - Arnold Creek
      - Falling Creek
    - Oswego Creek
      - Springbrook Creek
        - Three Sisters Creek
      - Lamont Creek
    - Clackamas River
      - Eda Creek
      - Johnson Creek
      - Rock Creek
      - Clear Creek
        - Hattin Creek
        - Bargfeld Creek
        - Little Clear Creek
          - Mosier Creek
        - Tennys Creek
        - Swagger Creek
        - Little Clear Creek
      - Richardson Creek
      - Foster Creek
      - Deep Creek
        - Noyer Creek
        - North Fork Deep Creek
          - Doane Creek
          - Dolan Creek
        - Tickle Creek
          - South Fork Tickle Creek
      - Goose Creek
      - Eagle Creek
        - Currin Creek
          - Saling Creek
        - North Fork Eagle Creek
          - Bear Creek
          - Kasch Creek
          - Little Eagle Creek
          - Trout Creek
        - Delph Creek
        - South Fork Eagle Creek
      - Dubois Creek
      - Lingleback Creek
      - North Fork Clackamas River
        - Fall Creek
        - Bee Creek
        - Bedford Creek
        - Whiskey Creek
        - Boyer Creek
        - Dry Creek
      - South Fork Clackamas River
        - Memaloose Creek
        - Oscar Creek
        - East Fork of the South Fork Clackamas River
      - Moore Creek
      - Hellion Creek
      - Fish Creek
      - Murphy Creek
      - Roaring River
        - Grouse Creek
        - South Fork Roaring River
        - Shining Creek
        - Squaw Creek
        - Plaza Creek
        - Splintercat Creek
        - Cougar Creek
      - Pup Creek
      - Dinner Creek
      - Cat Creek
      - Deer Creek
      - Three Lynx Creek
      - Cripple Creek
      - Whale Creek
      - Sandstone Creek
      - Big Creek
      - Oak Grove Fork Clackamas River
        - Pint Creek
        - Station Creek
        - Butte Creek
        - Canyon Creek
        - Skunk Creek
        - Sam Creek
        - Kelley Creek
        - Cat Creek
        - Shellrock Creek
        - Peavine Creek
        - Buck Creek
        - Stone Creek
        - Anvil Creek
        - Dinger Creek
        - Cooper Creek
        - Crater Creek
      - Tag Creek
      - Trout Creek
      - Collawash River
        - Jack Davis Creek
        - Cap Creek
        - Sluice Creek
        - Slide Creek
        - Hot Springs Fork
        - Paste Creek
        - Farm Creek
        - Peat Creek
        - Buckeye Creek
        - Dickey Creek
        - Happy Creek
        - Blitzen Creek
        - Russ Creek
        - Jazz Creek
        - Dunno Creek
        - Elk Lake Creek
        - East Fork Collawash River
      - Switch Creek
      - Granite Creek
      - Lost Creek
      - Cabin Creek
      - Kansas Creek
      - Campbell Creek
      - Pinhead Creek
      - Wall Creek
      - Lowe Creek
      - Rhododendron Creek
      - Fawn Creek
      - Hunter Creek
      - Sisi Creek
      - Cub Creek
      - Lemiti Creek
      - Squirrel Creek
    - Tanner Creek
    - Tualatin River
      - Fields Creek
      - Wilson Creek
        - Shipley Creek
      - Pecan Creek
      - Athey Creek
      - Oswego Canal (outflow)
      - Saum Creek
      - Nyberg Creek
      - Hedges Creek
      - Fanno Creek
        - Ball Creek
          - Carter Creek
        - Red Rock Creek
        - Summer Creek
        - Ash Creek
        - Hiteon Creek
        - Woods Creek
        - Vermont Creek
        - Sylvan Creek
        - Bridlemile Creek
        - Ivey Creek
      - Spring Creek
      - Rock Creek
      - Chicken Creek
        - Cedar Creek
          - Goose Creek
          - Bell Road Creek
        - West Fork Chicken Creek
      - McFee Creek
        - Heaton Creek
          - Baker Creek
          - Fir Clearing Creek
            - Schmeltzer Creek
        - Ayers Creek
        - Graver Creek
      - Burris Creek
        - Messinger Creek
      - Christensen Creek
      - Butternut Creek
      - Gordon Creek
      - Rock Creek
        - Abbey Creek
        - Holcomb Creek
        - Beaverton Creek
          - Bronson Creek
            - Bannister Creek
            - Ward Creek
          - Willow Creek
            - Waterhouse Creek
          - Cedar Mill Creek
            - Johnson Creek
          - Johnston Creek
          - Messinger Creek
          - Hall Creek
            - Golf Creek
        - Dawson Creek
      - Davis Creek
      - Jackson Slough
      - Dairy Creek
        - McKay Creek
          - Storey Creek
          - Jackson Creek
          - Neil Creek
            - East Fork McKay Creek
        - Council Creek
        - East Fork Dairy Creek
          - Bledsoe Creek
            - Bausch Creek
          - Gumm Creek
            - Baker Creek
          - Big Canyon
          - Murtaugh Creek
          - Meadow Brook Creek
          - Plentywater Creek
          - Denny Creek
          - Rock Creek
          - Panther Creek
          - Roundy Creek
          - Campbell Creek
        - West Fork Dairy Creek
          - Lousignont Canal
          - Cedar Canyon Creek
          - Garrigus Creek
          - Kuder Creek
          - Whitcher Creek
          - Mendenhall Creek
          - Burgholzer Creek
          - Williams Creek
          - Cummings Creek
      - Gales Creek
        - Prickett Creek
        - Roderick Creek
        - Godfrey Creek
        - Kelley Creek
        - Clear Creek
        - Iller Creek
        - Fir Creek
        - Little Beaver Creek
        - White Creek
        - Lyda Creek
        - Bateman Creek
        - Beaver Creek
        - Coffee Creek
        - Finger Creek
        - South Fork Gales Creek
        - North Fork Gales Creek
        - Low Divide Creek
      - Dilley Creek
      - O'Neill Creek
      - Scoggins Creek
        - Sain Creek
        - Tanner Creek
        - Wall Creek
        - Parsons Creek
        - Fisher Creek
      - Wapato Creek
        - Hill Creek
        - Ayers Creek
        - Goodin Creek
          - Little Russell Creek
      - Black Jack Creek
      - Mercer Creek
      - Hering Creek
      - Roaring Creek
      - Patten Creek
      - Lee Creek
      - Sunday Creek
      - Maple Creek
    - Beaver Creek
      - Parrott Creek
    - Molalla River
      - Pudding River
        - Rock Creek
          - Bear Creek
          - Cedar Creek
          - Kaiser Creek
          - Garrett Creek
          - Thomas Creek
        - Butte Creek
          - Coal Creek
            - Little Coal Creek
          - Fall Creek
          - Looney Creek
          - Kirk Creek
          - South Fork Butte Creek
          - Fibre Creek
          - Rhody Creek
          - Fill Creek
          - Camp Creek
        - Zollner Creek
        - Little Pudding River
          - Carnes Creek
          - Lake Labish Ditch
          - Woods Creek
          - West Fork
        - Abiqua Creek
          - Powers Creek
          - Echo Creek
          - Hammond Creek
          - Goober Creek
          - Johnson Creek
          - Homestead Creek
          - Bucket Creek
          - Trinity Falls Creek
          - Wildcat Creek
          - Sweet Spring Creek
        - Silver Creek
          - Brush Creek
          - North Fork Silver Creek
            - Little North Fork Silver Creek
          - South Fork Silver Creek
            - Howard Creek
              - Smith Creek
        - Drift Creek
      - Gribble Creek
        - Dove Creek
      - Milk Creek
      - Woodcock Creek
      - Dickey Creek
      - Cedar Creek
      - Russell Creek
      - North Fork Molalla River
      - Trout Creek
      - Pine Creek
      - Shotgun Creek
      - Bear Creek
      - Cow Creek
      - Gawley Creek
      - Horse Creek
      - Table Rock Fork
      - Bull Creek
      - Avalanche Creek
      - Dungeon Creek
      - Minette Creek
      - Hay Barn Creek
      - Scorpion Creek
      - Lake Creek
      - Mining Iron Creek
      - Ogle Creek
      - Henry Creek
    - Newland Creek
    - Boeckman Creek
    - Coffee Lake Creek
    - Corral Creek
      - Mill Creek
      - North Fork Corral Creek
      - Middle Fork Corral Creek
      - South Fork Corral Creek
    - Ryan Creek
    - Champoeg Creek
      - Mission Creek
      - Case Creek
      - Murphy Creek
      - East Fork Champoeg Creek
      - West Fork Champoeg Creek
    - Spring Brook
    - High Water Slough
    - Chehalem Creek
      - Harvey Creek
      - Bryan Creek
    - Yamhill River
      - Palmer Creek
      - Henry Creek
      - Millican Creek
      - Hawn Creek
      - North Yamhill River
        - Panther Creek
        - Yamhill Creek
        - Rowland Creek
        - Salt Creek
        - Hutchcroft Creek
        - Turner Creek
        - Cedar Creek
        - Haskins Creek
        - Fairchild Creek
        - Petch Creek
        - Hanna Creek
        - Maroney Creek
        - Perkins Creek
      - South Yamhill River
        - Cozine Creek
        - Salt Creek
        - Deer Creek
        - Rock Creek
        - Mill Creek
        - Ash Creek
        - Willamina Creek
          - Tinkle Creek
          - Coast Creek
          - East Creek
          - Cedar Creek
        - Cockerham Creek
        - Doane Creek
        - Lady Creek
        - Gold Creek
        - Klees Creek
        - Casper Creek
        - Rowell Creek
        - Rock Creek
        - Rogue River
        - Agency Creek
          - Wind River
        - Elmer Creek
        - Crooked Creek
        - Cedar Creek
        - Ead Creek
        - Pierce Creek
        - Kitten Creek
        - Hanchet Creek
    - Lambert Slough
    - Eldridge Slough
    - King Creek
    - Spring Valley Creek
    - Glenn Creek
    - Mill Creek
      - Mill Race
      - Shelton Ditch
      - Battle Creek
      - Perrin Lateral
      - Beaver Creek
      - Porter Creek
      - Salem Ditch
      - North Fork Mill Creek
      - South Fork Mill Creek
    - Rickreall Creek
      - Hayden Slough
        - Oak Point Creek
      - McNary Creek
      - Baskett Slough
        - Mud Slough
          - McNary Branch
          - Goodwin Branch
          - McMahan Branch
      - Ellendale Creek
      - Canyon Creek
      - Applegate Creek
      - Skid Creek
      - Rockhouse Creek
      - Laurel Creek
      - South Fork Rickreall Creek
    - Fuller Creek
    - Ash Creek
      - South Fork Ash Creek
      - Middle Fork Ash Creek
      - North Fork Ash Creek
    - Rock Creek
      - Bashaw Creek
        - Miller Creek
          - Neil Creek
    - Luckiamute River
      - Soap Creek
      - Little Luckiamute River
        - Cooper Creek
        - Fern Creek
        - Teal Creek
        - Waymire Creek
        - Berry Creek
        - Dutch Creek
        - Sam's Creek
        - Black Rock Creek
        - Camp Creek
        - Lost Creek
      - Jont Creek
      - Dry Creek
      - Link Creek
      - McTimmonds Creek
      - Pedee Creek
      - Ritner Creek
        - Kinsey Creek
        - Clayton Creek
        - Love Creek
        - Sheythe Creek
      - Bump Creek
      - Maxfield Creek
      - Price Creek
        - Woods Creek
      - Plunkett Creek
        - Watson Creek
      - Vincent Creek
        - Burgett Creek
        - Alexander Creek
      - Bonner Creek
      - Jones Creek
      - Foster Creek
      - Hull Creek
      - Harris Creek
      - Slide Creek
      - Cougar Creek
      - Slick Creek
      - Rock Pit Creek
      - Wolf Creek
      - Miller Creek
      - Beaver Creek
      - Boulder Creek
    - Santiam River
      - Chehulpum Creek
      - Morgan Creek
      - North Santiam River
        - Smallman Creek
        - Logan Slough
        - Cold Creek
        - Valentine Creek
        - Alder Creek
        - Stout Creek
        - Trusk Creek
        - Little North Santiam River
          - Polly Creek
          - Cox Creek
          - Jeeter Creek
          - Beaver Creek
          - Kiel Creek
          - Canyon Creek
          - Bear Creek
          - Cougar Creek
          - Big Creek
          - Moorehouse Creek
          - Sinker Creek
          - Fish Creek
          - Elkhorn Creek
            - Buck Creek
          - Fawn Creek
          - Evans Creek
          - Henline Creek
          - Dry Creek
          - Little Cedar Creek
          - Cedar Creek
          - Stack Creek
            - East Stack Creek
          - Cold Creek
          - Tincup Creek
          - Horn Creek
          - Gold Creek
            - East Gold Creek
          - Opal Creek
          - Battle Ax Creek
        - Alder Creek
        - Manis Creek
        - Cherry Creek
        - Snake Creek
        - Rock Creek
        - Turnidge Creek
        - Mad Creek
        - Minto Creek
        - Packsaddle Creek
        - Bad Banks Creek
        - Niagara Creek
        - Sevenmile Creek
        - Little Washout Creek
        - Big Washout Creek
        - Little Sardine Creek
        - Big Sardine Creek
        - Mayflower Creek
        - Cumley Creek via Detroit Lake
        - Whitman Creek via Detroit Lake
        - M&M Creek via Detroit Lake
        - Heater Creek via Detroit Lake
        - Box Canyon Creek via Detroit Lake
        - Blowout Creek via Detroit Lake
        - Sauers Creek via Detroit Lake
        - Tumble Creek via Detroit Lake
        - Breitenbush River via Detroit Lake
          - North Fork Breitenbush River
            - Rapidan Creek
            - Mink Creek
            - South Fork North Fork Breitenbush River
          - South Fork Breitenbush River
            - Lake Creek
        - Mackey Creek via Detroit Lake
        - Hansen Creek via Detroit Lake
        - Dry Creek via Detroit Lake
        - Tom Creek via Detroit Lake
        - Loy Creek via Detroit Lake
        - Boulder Creek
        - Cabin Creek
        - Rainbow Creek
        - McCoy Creek
        - Bear Lake Creek
        - Marys Creek
        - Misery Creek
        - Tunnel Creek
        - Spring Creek
        - Whitewater Creek
        - Pamelia Creek
          - Woodpecker Creek
        - Minto Creek
        - Bruno Creek
        - Marion Creek
          - Horn Creek
        - Bugaboo Creek
        - Parkett Creek
        - Downing Creek
        - Straight Creek
        - Lynx Creek
        - Camp Creek
        - Swede Creek
      - South Santiam River
        - Mill Creek
        - Thomas Creek
          - Sucker Slough
          - Mill Creek
          - South Fork
          - Jordan Creek
          - Criminal Creek
          - Indian Prairie Creek
          - Ella Creek
          - Hall Creek
        - Crabtree Creek
          - Beaver Creek
          - Roaring River
            - Milky Fork
          - Church Creek
          - Hunter Creek
          - Green Mountain Creek
          - Rock Creek
          - Bald Peter Creek
          - South Fork Crabtree Creek
          - Dorgan Creek
          - White Rock Creek
          - Bonnie Creek
        - Spring Branch
        - Onehorse Creek
        - Hamilton Creek
        - McDowell Creek
        - Roaring Creek
        - Ames Creek
        - Wiley Creek
        - Gadney Creek
        - Ralston Creek
        - Middle Santiam River
          - Lewis Creek
          - Coal Creek
          - Alder Creek
          - Little Bottom Creek
          - Green Peter Creek
          - Thistle Creek
          - Rumbaugh Creek
          - Whitcomb Creek
          - Quartzville Creek
            - Fool's Canyon
            - Moose Creek
            - Trout Creek
            - Panther Creek
            - Four Bit Creek
            - Yellowstone Creek
            - Boulder Creek
            - Packers Gulch
            - Yellowbottom Creek
            - Canal Creek
              - Dry Gulch
              - Beverly Creek
              - Cedar Creek
              - Elk Creek
            - Galena Creek
            - Savage Creek
            - Green Creek
            - Gold Creek
            - McQuade Creek
            - Gregg Creek
            - Little Meadow Creek
            - Beabe Creek
            - Freezeout Creek
            - Bruler Creek
            - Butte Creek
          - Tally Creek
          - Cave Creek
          - Knickerbocker Creek
          - Elk Creek
          - Maple Creek
          - Crash Creek
          - Cougar Creek
          - Twin Falls Creek
          - Bear Creek
          - Sixes Creek
          - Chimney Creek
          - Fitt Creek
          - Egg Creek
          - Jude Creek
          - Donaca Creek
          - Pyramid Creek
          - Bachelor Creek
          - South Pyramid Creek
          - Lake Creek
          - Holman Creek
          - Cougar Creek
        - Shot Pouch Creek
        - Deer Creek
        - Mouse Creek
        - Bucksnort Creek
        - Cabin Creek
        - Soda Creek
        - Dobbin Creek
        - Wolf Creek
        - Canyon Creek
        - Moose Creek
        - Falls Creek
        - Trout Creek
        - Little Boulder Creek
        - Boulder Creek
        - Keith Creek
        - Stewart Creek
        - Soda Fork
        - Elk Creek
        - Sheep Creek
        - Three Creek
        - Squaw Creek
        - Sevenmile Creek
    - Calapooia River
      - Oak Creek
      - Lake Creek
      - Butte Creek
      - Warren Creek
      - Brush Creek
      - Sawyer Creek
      - Pugh Creek
      - Cedar Creek
      - Sweet Honey Creek
      - Fox Creek
      - Bigs Creek
      - Blue Creek
      - McKinley Creek
      - Washout Creek
      - Barrett Creek
      - Potts Creek
      - King Creek
      - North Fork Calapooia River
      - United States Creek
      - Treadwall Creek
        - Keeney Creek
          - East Fork Keeney Creek
          - West Fork Keeney Creek
      - Eighteen Creek
    - Little Willamette River
      - Coon Creek
    - Bowers Slough
    - Dead River
      - Owl Creek
    - Marys River
      - Oak Creek
        - Lamprey Creek
        - Mulkey Creek
        - Skunk Creek
        - Alder Creek
      - Squaw Creek
      - Muddy Creek
      - Newton Creek
      - Greasy Creek
      - Woods Creek
      - Blakesley Creek
      - Read Creek
      - La Bare Creek
      - Gellatly Creek
      - Tumtum River
      - Norton Creek
      - Devitt Creek
      - East Fork Marys River
      - West Fork Marys River
    - Muddy Creek
      - Little Muddy Creek
      - Dry Muddy Creek
    - Long Tom River
      - Miller Creek
      - Shafer Creek
      - Ferguson Creek
      - Amazon Creek
      - Bear Creek
      - Lingo Slough
      - Squaw Creek
      - Inman Creek at Fern Ridge Reservoir
      - Coyote Creek at Fern Ridge Reservoir
        - Spencer Creek
        - Sturtevant Creek
        - Battle Creek
        - Nighswander Creek
        - Jordan Creek
          - Health Springs Branch
        - Hayes Branch
        - Powell Creek
        - Beaver Creek
        - Bear Creek
        - Fox Hollow
          - Preacher Creek
        - Doak Creek
        - Jackson Creek
        - Rebel Creek
      - Hannavan Creek at Fern Ridge Reservoir
      - Indian Creek
      - Wilson Creek
      - Noti Creek
      - Gold Creek
      - Green Creek
      - Sweet Creek
      - Hayes Creek
      - Board Creek
      - Dusky Creek
      - Swamp Creek
      - Jones Creek
      - Michaels Creek
    - Ingram Slough
    - Curtis Slough
    - Spring Creek
    - McKenzie River
      - Mohawk River
        - Sister Creek
        - Stafford Creek
        - Spores Creek
        - Alder Branch
        - McGowan Creek
        - Parsons Creek
        - Cartwright Creek
        - Mill Creek
          - Wolf Creek
          - Oshkosh Creek
          - Deer Creek
          - Nebo Creek
          - Straight Creek
        - Polly Creek
        - Shotgun Creek
        - Drury Creek
        - Bette Creek
        - Log Creek
        - North Fork Mohawk River
        - South Fork Mohawk River
      - Blue River
        - Simmond Creek
        - Quartz Creek via Blue River Reservoir
        - North Fork Quartz Creek via Blue River Reservoir
        - Scott Creek via Blue River Reservoir
        - Lookout Creek
          - McRae Creek
          - Nostoc Creek
          - Saddle Creek
          - Mack Creek
        - Mona Creek
        - Tidbits Creek
          - Ore Creek
        - Flunky Creek
        - Cook Creek
        - Quentin Creek
          - Slipout Creek
        - Mann Creek
        - Wolf Creek
      - South Fork McKenzie River
        - East Fork South Fork McKenzie River
        - Walker Creek
        - Tipsoo Creek
        - French Pete Creek
          - Pat Creek
          - Olallie Creek
        - Roaring River
          - Moss Creek
          - McBee Creek
      - Horse Creek
        - West Fork Horse Creek
          - Drury Creek
          - Taylor Creek
        - East Fork Horse Creek
        - King Creek
        - Owl Creek
        - Wilelada Creek
        - Cedar Swamp Creek
        - Avenue Creek
        - Spring Creek
        - Halfinger Creek
        - Separation Creek
        - Castle Creek
        - Roney Creek
        - Pothole Creek
        - Mosquito Creek
        - Eugene Creek
      - Lost Creek
        - White Branch
      - Smith River
        - Bunchgrass Creek
        - Browder Creek
        - Gate Creek
    - Dodson Slough
    - Dedrick Slough
    - Coast Fork Willamette River
      - Bear Creek
      - Gettings Creek
      - Row River
        - Mosby Creek
          - Champion Creek
          - Kizer Creek
          - Perkins Creek
          - Smith Creek
          - Kennedy Creek
          - Fall Creek
          - Short Creek
          - Blue Creek
          - Simpson Creek
          - Lewis Creek
          - Rock Creek
          - Palmer Creek
          - Cow Creek
          - Clearing Creek
          - Cedar Creek
          - Allen Creek
          - Stell Creek
          - Bark Shanty Creek
          - Dry Creek
          - Little Dry Creek
          - Dahl Creek
          - Norwegian Creek
          - Gray Creek
          - Shea Creek
          - Brownie Creek
          - Lilly Creek
          - Tones Creek
          - Miles Creek
          - Tom Creek
          - Cove Creek
          - West Fork Mosby Creek
          - East Fork Mosby Creek
        - Hann's Creek
        - Baker Creek
        - Rat Creek
        - Bluff Creek
        - Smith Creek
        - Vaughn Creek
        - Anderson Creek
        - King Creek
        - Pitcher Creek
        - Cedar Creek
        - Hawley Creek
        - Culp Creek
        - Sharps Creek
          - Boulder Creek
          - Damewood Creek
          - Table Creek
          - Pony Creek
          - Staples Creek
          - Lick Creek
          - Buck Creek
          - Walker Creek
          - White Creek
          - Martin Creek
          - Sailors Creek
          - Fairview Creek
          - Judson Rock Creek
          - Bohemia Creek
        - Hunt Creek
        - Gleason Creek
        - Layng Creek
        - Brice Creek
      - Big River
        - Martin Creek
        - Bar Creek
        - Edward Creek
        - Boulder Creek
        - Box Canyon
      - Little River
        - Dennis Creek
        - Blood Creek
        - Garoutte Creek
          - Carlson Creek
        - Trail Creek
        - Cinnabar Creek
        - Weyerhaeuser Creek
    - Middle Fork Willamette River
      - Pudding Creek
      - Wallace Creek
      - Hills Creek
      - Rattlesnake Creek
      - Alder Creek
      - Fall Creek
        - Little Fall Creek
          - Norton Creek
          - Sturdy Creek
        - Winberry Creek via Fall Creek Lake
          - Nelson Creek
          - Alder Creek
          - Brush Creek
          - North Fork Winberry Creek
            - Minnehaha Creek
            - Blanket Creek
            - Traverse Creek
          - South Fork Winberry Creek
            - Monterica Creek
            - Cabin Creek
        - North Fork Fall Creek
        - Little Gold Creek
        - Boundary Creek
        - Timber Creek
        - Slick Creek
        - Bedrock Creek
        - Andy Creek
        - Portland Creek
          - Bubble Creek
          - Gales Creek
          - Logan Creek
            - PK Creek
        - Jones Creek
        - Puma Creek
        - Alder Creek
          - Zog Creek
        - Gibraltar Creek
        - Small Creek
        - Hehe Creek
          - Sunshine Creek
          - Pernot Creek
        - Marine Creek
        - Tiller Creek
        - Pacific Creek
        - Gold Creek
        - Ninemile Creek
        - Delp Creek
        - Saturn Creek
          - Platt Creek
          - Platt Creek
        - Briem Creek
        - Buzzard Creek
      - Lost Creek
        - Wagner Creek
        - Anthony Creek
        - Middle Creek
        - Carr Creek
        - Gossage Creek
          - East Gossage Creek
        - Guiley Creek
      - Noisy Creek (via Dexter Reservoir)
      - Minnow Creek (via Lookout Point Reservoir)
      - Rolling Riffle Creek (via Lookout Point Reservoir)
      - Hazel Creek (via Lookout Point Reservoir)
      - Bannister Creek (via Lookout Point Reservoir)
      - Fern Creek (via Lookout Point Reservoir)
      - Goodman Creek (via Lookout Point Reservoir)
      - Crale Creek (via Lookout Point Reservoir)
      - Rhodes Creek (via Lookout Point Reservoir)
      - School Creek (via Lookout Point Reservoir)
      - Cain Creek (via Lookout Point Reservoir)
      - Harper Creek (via Lookout Point Reservoir)
      - Armet Creek (via Lookout Point Reservoir)
      - North Creek (via Lookout Point Reservoir)
      - South Creek (via Lookout Point Reservoir)
      - Schweitzer Creek (via Lookout Point Reservoir)
      - Carpet Hill Creek (via Lookout Point Reservoir)
      - Duval Creek (via Lookout Point Reservoir)
      - Hospital Creek
      - Rock Creek
      - Whitehead Creek
      - Tire Creek
      - Bridge Creek
      - Buckhead Creek
      - Dell Creek
      - Deception Creek
      - North Fork Middle Fork Willamette River
      - Chillo Creek
      - Spot Creek
      - Gray Creek
      - Shortridge Creek
      - Salmon Creek
      - Salt Creek
      - Hills Creek (via Hills Creek Reservoir)
        - TNT Creek
      - Larlson Creek (via Hills Creek Reservoir)
      - Modoc Creek (via Hills Creek Reservoir)
      - Packard Creek (via Hills Creek Reservoir)
      - Bull Creek (via Hills Creek Reservoir)
      - Stony Creek (via Hills Creek Reservoir)
      - Little Willow Creek (via Hills Creek Reservoir)
      - Big Willow Creek (via Hills Creek Reservoir)
      - Coffeepot Creek (via Hills Creek Reservoir)
      - Snow Creek (via Hills Creek Reservoir)
      - Windfall Creek
      - Gold Creek
      - Buck Creek
      - Cone Creek
      - Bills Creek
      - Bohemia Creek
      - Estep Creek
      - Fy Creek
      - Snake Creek
      - Butcherknife Creek
      - Boulder Creek
      - Spring Butte Creek
      - Dry Creek
      - Indian Creek
      - What Creek
      - Youngs Creek
      - Coal Creek
      - Jims Creek
      - Deadhorse Creek
      - Gravel Creek
      - Simpson Creek
      - Maple Creek
      - Staley Creek
      - Echo Creek
      - Mac Creek
      - Swift Creek
      - Skunk Creek
      - Found Creek
      - Indigo Creek
      - Fizz Creek
      - Royal Creek
      - Tumblebug Creek
      - Beaver Creek
  - Sandy River
    - Beaver Creek
    - Big Creek
    - Buck Creek
    - Gordon Creek
    - Trout Creek
    - Bear Creek
    - Walker Creek
    - Bull Run River
      - Deer Creek
      - Laughing Water Creek
      - Bowman Creek
      - Little Sandy River
        - Sievers Creek
        - Arrow Creek
        - Bow Creek
      - South Fork Bull Run River
        - Cedar Creek
        - Fox Creek
      - Camp Creek
      - Bear Creek
      - Cougar Creek
      - Deer Creek
      - North Fork Bull Run River
      - Fir Creek
      - Falls Creek
        - West Branch Falls Creek
      - Log Creek
      - Blazed Alder Creek
        - County Creek
        - Nanny Creek
        - Bedrock Creek
        - Hickman Creek
    - Cedar Creek
      - Beaver Creek
    - Badger Creek
    - Whisky Creek
    - Alder Creek
    - Spring Creek
    - Wildcat Creek
    - Little Joe Creek
    - Salmon River
      - Boulder Creek
      - Cheeney Creek
      - South Fork Salmon River
        - Mack Hall Creek
      - Bighorn Creek
      - Goat Creek
      - Kinzel Creek
      - Iron Creek
        - Tumbling Creek
      - Linney Creek
      - Draw Creek
        - String Creek
      - Wolf Creek
      - Fir Tree Creek
      - Mud Creek
      - Ghost Creek
      - East Fork Salmon River
      - West Fork Salmon River
    - North Boulder Creek
    - Hackett Creek
    - Zigzag River
    - Clear Fork
    - Horseshoe Creek
    - Lost Creek
    - Muddy Fork
    - Rushing Water Creek
  - Rainbow Creek
  - Latourell Creek
    - Young Creek
    - Henderson Creek
  - Bridal Veil Creek
    - Donahue Creek
  - Coopey Creek
  - Wahkeena Creek
    - Multnomah Creek
  - Oneonta Creek
    - Horsetail Creek
  - Tumalt Creek
  - McCord Creek
  - Moffett Creek
    - Hamilton Island Reach
  - Tanner Creek
  - Eagle Creek
    - Sorenson Creek
    - Tish Creek
    - Opal Creek
    - Wy'East Creek
    - East Fork Eagle Creek
  - Ruckel Creek
  - Moody Creek
  - Dry Creek
  - Herman Creek
    - Little Herman Creek
    - Camp Creek
    - East Fork Herman Creek
      - Casey Creek
      - Hazel Creek
      - Slide Creek
      - Mullinix Creek
      - Whisky Creek
  - Grays Creek
  - Gorton Creek
  - Harphan Creek
  - Summit Creek
  - Lindsey Creek
    - Warren Creek
      - Wonder Creek
  - Cabin Creek
  - Starvation Creek
  - Viento Creek
  - Perham Creek
  - Mitchell Creek
  - Phelps Creek
    - Flume Creek
  - Henderson Creek
  - Hood River
    - Indian Creek
    - Cedar Creek
    - Whiskey Creek
    - Neal Creek
      - Lenz Creek
      - Shelly Creek
      - Shelley Creek
      - West Fork Neal Creek
      - Snakehead Creek
      - Beaver Creek
    - Odell Creek
    - Spring Creek
      - Ditch Creek
    - Pine Creek
      - South Pine Creek
        - Cedar Branch
    - Collins Creek
    - West Fork Hood River
    - East Fork Hood River
      - Dog River
    - Middle Fork Hood River
  - Deschutes River
    - Elder Creek
    - Winterwater Creek
    - White River
    - Oak Springs Creek
    - Spring Creek
    - Bakeoven Creek
    - Wapinitia Creek
    - Nena Creek
    - Eagle Creek
    - Cove Creek
    - Antoken Creek
    - Oak Creek
    - Skookum Creek
    - Swamp Creek
    - Warm Springs River
      - Beaver Creek
        - Butte Creek
      - Mill Creek
      - Badger Creek
      - South Fork Warm Springs River
      - Bunchgrass Creek
      - Dry Creek
    - Trout Creek
    - Shitike Creek
    - Campbell Creek
    - Dry Hollow
    - Willow Creek
      - Dry Canyon
      - McMeen Creek
      - Newbill Creek
      - Coon Creek
      - Higgins Creek
    - Metolius River
      - Whitewater River
      - Metolius Springs
    - Crooked River
      - Dry River
      - Ochoco Creek
        - Mill Creek
        - Polly Creek
        - Lawson Creek
        - Veasle Creek
        - Salmon Creek
        - Camp Branch
        - Wolf Creek
        - Duncan Creek
        - Douthit Creek
        - Garden Creek
        - Metal Creek
        - Coyle Creek
        - Canyon Creek
        - Fisher Creek
        - Judy Creek
        - McAllister Creek
        - Aholt Creek
        - Camp Creek
      - North Fork Crooked River
      - South Fork Crooked River
        - Twelvemile Creek
        - Sand Hollow Creek
        - Buck Creek
      - Beaver Creek
        - Drift Canyon
        - Profanity Gulch
        - Alkali Creek
        - Paulina Creek
        - Wolf Creek
        - Grindstone Creek
        - Sugar Creek
    - Whychus Creek
    - Tumalo Creek
    - Spring River
    - Little Deschutes River
      - Paulina Creek
      - Crescent Creek
        - Big Marsh Creek
      - Hemlock Creek
        - Spruce Creek
          - Rabbit Creek
        - Swamp Creek
        - Basin Creek
      - Clover Creek
      - Burn Creek
    - Fall River
      - Indian Creek
    - Deer Creek
    - Cultus Creek
    - Cultus River
    - Snow Creek
  - John Day River
    - Rock Creek
    - Thirtymile Creek
      - Dry Fork Thirtymile Creek
      - East Fork Thirtymile Creek
      - Lost Valley Creek
      - Salmon Fork Thirtymile Creek
      - Searcy Creek
        - Little Searcy Creek
    - Bridge Creek
    - North Fork John Day River
      - Middle Fork John Day River
    - South Fork John Day River
  - Umatilla River
    - Butter Creek
    - Birch Creek
    - North Fork Umatilla River
      - Coyote Creek
      - Woodward Creek
      - Johnson Creek
    - South Fork Umatilla River
      - Buck Creek
      - Thomas Creek
      - Shimmiehorn Creek
  - Walla Walla River
  - Snake River
    - Grande Ronde River
      - Wenaha River
        - Crooked Creek
        - Burnt Canyon Creek
        - Fairview Creek
        - Cross Canyon
        - Weller Creek
        - Swamp Creek
        - Butte Creek
        - Big Hole Canyon
        - Rock Creek
        - Slick Ear Creek
        - Beaver Creek
        - North Fork Wenaha River
          - Deep Saddle Creek
        - South Fork Wenaha River
          - Elk Creek
          - Jaussard Creek
          - Cougar Canyon
          - Trapper Creek
          - Milk Creek
      - Courtney Creek
      - Mud Creek
      - Wildcat Creek
      - Grossman Creek
      - Elbow Creek
      - Bear Creek
      - Wallowa River
        - Howard Creek
          - Wise Creek
        - Fisher Creek
        - Minam River
          - Squaw Creek
          - Gunderson Creek
          - Cougar Creek
          - Trout Creek
          - Murphy Creek
          - Eagle Creek
          - Lobo Creek
          - Faun Creek
          - Little Minam River
            - Black Creek
            - Grouse Creek
            - Big Canyon
            - Boulder Creek
            - Huckleberry Creek
            - Threemile Creek
            - Grizzly Creek
            - Horseshoe Creek
            - Fireline Creek
            - Dobbin Creek
          - Horse Basin Creek
          - Horseheaven Creek
          - Wallowa Creek
          - Chaparral Creek
          - Whoopee Creek
          - Garwood Creek
          - Threemile Creek
          - Jerry Creek
          - Little Pot Creek
          - North Minam River
          - Pot Creek
          - Pole Creek
          - Lackey Creek
          - Rock Creek
          - Cap Creek
          - Last Chance Creek
          - Elk Creek
          - Granite Gulch
          - Wild Sheep Creek
          - Lowry Gulch
          - Trail Creek
          - Pop Creek
        - Deer Creek
          - Sage Creek
        - Rock Creek
          - Dry Creek
            - Spring Creek
            - Boyd Creek
        - Bear Creek
          - Little Bear Creek
          - Doc Creek
          - Fox Creek
          - Goat Creek
            - McCubbin Creek
          - Dobbin Creek
          - Lake Basin Creek
          - Saddle Basin Creek
          - Blowout Basin Creek
          - Twin Basin Creek
          - Miner Basin Creek
          - Granite Creek
        - Lostine River
      - Lookingglass Creek
      - Catherine Creek
        - Mill Creek
        - McAlister Slough
        - Ladd Creek
        - Little Creek
        - Pyles Creek
        - Little Catherine Creek
        - Milk Creek
        - Scout Creek
        - North Fork Catherine Creek
        - South Fork Catherine Creek
    - Imnaha River
      - Toomey Gulch
      - Trough Gulch
      - Vance Draw
      - Cow Creek
      - Lightning Creek
      - Tulley Creek
      - Corral Creek
      - Little Basin Creek
      - Buck Creek
      - Packsaddle Creek
      - Kettle Creek
      - Log Creek
      - Fall Creek
      - Fence Creek
      - Bare Creek
      - Burcher Canyon
      - Weaver Canyon
      - Bailey Canyon
      - Adams Canyon
      - Sheep Creek
      - Deer Creek
      - High Camp Creek
      - Dead Horse Creek
      - Rippleton Creek
      - Dunlap Creek
      - Thorn Creek
      - Jody Creek
      - Keeler Creek
      - Loyd Creek
      - Snell Creek
      - Spring Creek
      - Schleur Creek
      - Adams Creek
      - College Creek
      - Double Creek
      - Blackmore Creek
      - Turner Creek
      - Indian Creek
      - Freezeout Creek
      - Dunn Creek
      - Campbell Creek
      - Chalk Creek
      - Beeler Creek
      - Park Creek
      - Winston Creek
      - Line Creek
      - Balter Creek
      - Musty Creek
      - Grouse Creek
      - Shin Creek
      - Johnson Creek
      - Neil Canyon
      - Trail Creek
      - Leggett Creek
      - Grizzly Creek
      - Keener Gulch
      - Henry Creek
      - Crazyman Creek
      - Spring Creek
      - Nine Point Creek
      - Mahogany Creek
      - Gumboot Creek
      - Blackhorse Creek
      - Dry Creek
      - Beaverdam Creek
      - Skookum Creek
      - Rock Creek
      - Deadman Canyon
      - South Fork Imnaha River
      - North Fork Imnaha River
    - Powder River
      - Timber Canyon
      - Little Timber Canyon
      - Foster Gulch
      - Ruth Gulch
      - Long Hollow
      - Daly Creek
      - Squaw Creek
      - Spring Creek
      - Cherry Spring Creek
      - Eagle Creek
        - Summit Creek
        - Barnard Creek
        - Skull Creek
        - Town Gulch
        - Trouble Creek
        - Little Eagle Creek
        - Holcomb Creek
        - Six Dollar Gulch
        - Shanghai Creek
        - Puzzle Creek
        - Dempsey Creek
        - Basin Creek
        - Empire Gulch
        - Paddy Creek
        - Torchlight Gulch
        - Blue Canyon
        - East Fork Eagle River
        - Bradley Creek
        - O'Brien Creek
        - Bennet Creek
        - Dixie Creek
        - Excelsior Gulch
        - Skookum Creek
        - West Eagle Creek
        - Two Color Creek
        - Little Boulder Creek
        - Boulder Creek
        - Copper Creek
        - Bench Canyon
        - Cached Creek
      - Myers Gulch
      - Kirby Creek
      - Chalk Creek
      - Rock Gulch
      - Waterbury Gulch
      - Deep Gulch
      - Deer Gulch
      - Three Canyon
      - Reed Gulch
      - Lower Timber Canyon
      - Goodwin Gulch
      - Upper Timber Gulch
      - Canyon Creek
      - Rattlesnake Gulch
      - Maiden Gulch
      - Hole-in-the-Wall Gulch
      - Murray Gulch
      - Rich Creek
      - Pittsburgh Gulch
      - Corral Gulch
      - Crystal Palace Gulch
      - Fivemile Creek
      - Bacher Creek
      - Spring Creek
      - Love Creek
      - Goose Creek
      - Ritter Creek
      - Balm Creek
      - Bulldozer Creek
      - Clover Creek
      - Ruckles Creek
      - Tucker Creek
      - Table Creek
      - Houghton Creek
      - Crews Creek
      - Salt Creek
      - Big Creek
      - Magpie Creek
      - Cusick Creek
      - Antelope Creek
      - Jimmy Creek
      - Wolf Creek
      - North Powder River
        - Pilcher Creek
        - Anthony Creek
        - Gorham Gulch
        - Little Antone Creek
        - Antone Creek
        - Dutch Flat Creek
        - Lawrence Creek
        - Jimmy Creek
        - Twin Mountain Creek
        - North Fork North Powder River
        - Horse Creek
      - Warms Springs Creek
      - Gentry Creek
      - Muddy Creek
      - Sand Creek
      - Fish Creek
      - Rock Creek
      - Willow Creek
      - Pine Creek
      - Old Settlers Slough
      - Baldock Slough
      - Sutton Lodge Creek
      - Shaffner Creek
      - Timber Gulch
      - Spring Creek Gulch
      - Juniper Gulch
      - Beaver Creek
      - Blue Canyon
      - Trail Creek
      - Rancheria Creek
      - Donny Creek
      - Lake Creek
      - Poker Creek
      - Sheep Creek
      - California Gulch
      - Union Creek
      - Bridge Creek
      - Dean Creek
      - Smith Creek
      - Miners Creek
      - Crevice Creek
      - Clear Creek
      - Cook Gulch
      - Worley Creek
      - Hawley Gulch
      - Huckleberry Creek
      - Bear Gulch
      - Spruce Gulch
      - Sawmill Gulch
      - Cracker Creek
      - McCully Fork
    - Burnt River
      - Durbin Creek
      - Cavenaugh Creek
      - Goodman Creek
      - Marble Creek
      - Bragg Creek
      - Jett Creek
      - Powell Creek
      - Reiber Creek
      - Dixie Creek
      - Chimney Creek
      - Jordan Creek
      - Sisley Creek
      - Swayze Creek
      - Pritchard Creek
      - Powell Creek
      - Sinker Creek
      - Deer Creek
      - Cave Creek
      - Clarks Creek
      - Marble Creek
      - Auburn Creek
      - McClellan Creek
      - Mahogany Creek
      - Stack Creek
      - Koontz Creek
      - Mill Creek
      - Garnet Creek
      - Steep Creek
      - Reed Creek
      - Indian Creek
      - Pine Creek
      - Deer Creek
      - Independence Creek
      - Flint Creek
      - Big Creek
      - Rock Creek
      - Camp Creek
      - Beaverdam Creek
      - Pine Creek
      - North Fork Burnt River
      - West Fork Burnt River
      - Middle Fork Burnt River
      - South Fork Burnt River
        - Powell Gulch
        - Pole Creek
        - Bullrun Creek
        - Steep Creek
        - Amelia Creek
        - Barney Creek
        - Stevens Creek
        - Rail Gulch
        - Elk Creek
        - Spring Creek
        - Bear Creek
        - Lookout Creek
    - Malheur River
      - Willow Creek
        - Mud Creek
        - Little Willow Creek
        - Turner Creek
        - Lick Creek
          - Gum Creek
        - Phipps Creek
          - West Fork Phipps Creek
        - Black Creek
      - Bully Creek
      - North Fork Malheur River
        - Little Malheur River
      - South Fork Malheur River
        - Granite Creek
        - Hot Springs Creek
        - McEwen Creek
        - Buck Creek
        - Visher Creek
        - Cobb Creek
        - Coyote Creek
        - Coleman Creek
        - Swamp Creek
        - Crane Creek
        - Pole Creek
        - Deadman Creek
        - Indian Creek
        - Camp Creek
    - Owyhee River
      - Crooked Rattlesnake Creek
      - Jordan Creek
        - Boney Canyon
        - Dry Creek
        - Rock Creek
        - Cow Creek
        - Jack Creek
        - Downey Creek
        - Hooker Creek
        - Sheep Spring Creek
        - Baxter Creek
        - Trout Creek
      - North Fork Owyhee River
        - Middle Fork Owyhee River
          - Pole Creek
          - Field Creek
          - Berry Gulch
          - Summit Springs Creek
        - Cherry Creek
        - Squaw Creek
        - Juniper Creek
        - Pleasant Valley Creek
        - Noon Creek
      - West Little Owyhee River
        - Cave Creek
        - Toppin Creek
        - Little Spring Creek
        - Jack Creek
        - Lake Fork West Owyhee River
    - Succor Creek (originates and drains into Snake River outside Oregon)
- Necanicum River
  - Neawanna Creek
    - Neacoxie Creek
      - East Fork Neacoxie Creek
    - Thompson Creek
      - Mill Creek
  - Shangri-La Creek
  - Little Muddy Creek
  - Circle Creek
  - Beerman Creek
  - Williamson Creek
  - Meyer Creek
  - Volmer Creek
  - Klootchy Creek
  - Johnson Creek
  - Mail Creek
  - South Fork Necanicum River
    - Brandis Creek
  - Lindsley Creek
  - Alder Creek
  - North Fork Necanicum River
  - Wolf Creek
  - Little Humbug Creek
  - Warner Creek
  - Charlie Creek
  - Bergsvik Creek
    - Joe Creek
    - Little Joe Creek
  - Grindy Creek
- Indian Creek
- Canyon Creek
- Ecola Creek
  - Logan Creek
  - North Fork Ecola Creek
  - West Fork Ecola Creek
- Chisana Creek
- Clayton Creek
- Red Rock Creek
- Griffin Creek
- Fall Creek
- Austin Creek
- Asbury Creek
  - Shark Creek
- Arch Cape Creek
- Short Sand Creek
  - Necarney Creek
- Nehalem River
  - Jetty Creek
  - Messhouse Creek
  - Cheviot Creek
  - Japanese Creek
  - Alder Creek
    - Neahkahnie Creek
  - Vosburg Creek
  - Fisher Creek
    - Zimmerman Creek
  - Bobs Creek
  - North Fork Nehalem River
    - Anderson Creek
    - Coal Creek
      - West Fork Coal Creek
    - Gravel Creek
    - Rackheap Creek
      - Big Rackheap Creek
      - Little Rackheap Creek
    - Fall Creek
    - Acey Creek
    - Henderson Creek
    - Boykin Creek
    - Grassy Lake Creek
    - Cougar Creek
    - Trail Creek
    - Buchanan Creek
      - Soapstone Creek
        - Jack Horner Creek
    - Gods Valley Creek
      - Gray Creek
      - Crawford Creek
      - Hanson Creek
      - Hobsen Creek
      - Roberson Creek
      - Picket Creek
    - Lost Creek
    - Sweet Home Creek
    - Fall Creek
    - Little North Fork Nehalem River
  - Kebbe Creek
  - Foley Creek
    - Crystal Creek
    - East Foley Creek
    - Dry Creek
  - Roy Creek
  - Peterson Creek
  - School Creek
  - Anderson Creek
  - Batterson Creek
  - Skink Creek
  - Cook Creek
    - Dry Creek
    - Clammer Creek
    - Harliss Creek
    - Hanson Creek
    - McKenny Creek
    - South Fork Cook Creek
      - Starr Creek
    - Strahm Creek
    - East Fork Cook Creek
    - Granite Creek
    - Hoevet Creek
      - Forks Creek
  - McPherson Creek
  - Lost Creek
    - Sibley Creek
  - Fall Creek
    - West Fall Creek
    - Bidwell Creek
  - Helloff Creek
    - Pickens Creek
    - Rector Creek
      - Wooley Creek
  - Bastard Creek
  - Snark Creek
  - Salmonberry River
    - Hatchery Creek
    - Brix Creek
    - Belfort Creek
    - Preston Creek
    - Tank Creek
    - Tunnel Creek
    - Clay Creek
    - South Fork Salmonberry River
    - Bathtub Creek
    - North Fork Salmonberry River
    - Belding Creek
    - Sappington Creek
    - Kinney Creek
    - Wolf Creek
    - Little Baldwin Creek
    - Baldwin Creek
    - Pennoyer Creek
  - Cronin Creek
    - North Fork Cronin Creek
    - Middle Fork Cronin Creek
    - South Fork Cronin Creek
  - Spruce Run Creek
    - South Fork Spruce Run Creek
  - Lost Lake Creek
  - George Creek
  - Humbug Creek
    - McClure Creek
    - Larsen Creek
    - Big Creek
    - Alder Creek
      - Cedar Creek
    - East Humbug Creek
    - West Humbug Creek
      - Beaver Creek
        - Destruction Creek
  - Quartz Creek
    - North Fork Quartz Creek
    - South Fork Quartz Creek
  - Osweg Creek
  - George Creek
  - Cow Creek
  - Klines Creek
  - Moores Creek
  - Furtado Creek
  - Buster Creek
    - Walker Creek
    - Stanley Creek
  - Beneke Creek
    - Fishhawk Creek
      - Little Fishhawk Creek
      - Hamilton Creek
    - Gilmore Creek
    - Walker Creek
      - Trailover Creek
    - Bull Heifer Creek
  - Slaughters Creek
  - Crawford Creek
  - Strum Creek
  - Squaw Creek
    - West Branch Squaw Creek
  - Northrup Creek
    - Cow Creek
  - Sager Creek
  - Lousignont Creek
  - Nelson Creek
  - Grub Creek
  - Deep Creek
    - Cougar Creek
    - Lane Creek
  - Fishhawk Creek
    - Warner Creek
    - Boxler Creek
    - McCoon Creek
    - North Fork Fishhawk Creek
      - Wrong Way Creek
  - Beaver Creek
  - Adams Creek
  - Calvin Creek
  - Lindgren Creek
    - Lyons Creek
  - Battle Creek
    - Johnson Creek
    - Mud Fork
    - South Fork Battle Creek
  - Deer Creek
    - Little Deer Creek
  - Gus Creek
  - Cedar Creek
  - Oak Ranch Creek
    - Archibald Creek
  - Fall Creek
  - Crooked Creek
  - Cook Creek
  - East Fork Nehalem River
    - Dog Creek
    - Elk Creek
    - Kenusky Creek
    - Jim George Creek
  - Knickerson Creek
  - Coon Creek
  - Pebble Creek
    - Swamp Creek
    - Coal Creek
    - Dell Creek
    - West Fork Pebble Creek
  - Rock Creek
    - Bear Creek
    - Ivy Creek
    - Maynard Creek
    - Selder Creek
    - Fall Creek
    - Ginger Creek
    - Martin Creek
    - Weed Creek
    - Olson Creek
    - North Fork Rock Creek
    - Military Creek
    - South Fork Rock Creek
      - Bear Creek
  - Beaver Creek
  - Cedar Creek
  - Weed Creek
  - Clear Creek
    - South Prong Clear Creek
    - Green Timber Creek
      - North Fork Green Timber Creek
      - South Fork Green Timber Creek
    - Lower North Fork
    - Upper North Fork
    - South Fork Clear Creek
  - Kist Creek
  - Robinsom Creek
  - Wolf Creek
    - North Fork Wolf Creek
  - Lousignont Creek
    - North Fork Lousignont Creek
    - Carlson Creek
  - Castor Creek
  - Step Creek
  - Derby Creek
  - Reliance Creek
  - South Fork Nehalem River
- Crescent Creek
  - Steinhilber Creek
  - Spring Creek
- Saltair Creek
- Heitmiller Creek
- Brimmer Creek
  - Rock Creek
  - Watseco Creek
- Miami River
  - Electric Creek
  - Hobson Creek
    - Struby Creek
  - Illingsworth Creek
  - Moss Creek
  - Minich Creek
  - Peterson Creek
  - Prouty Creek
- Kilchis River
  - Murphy Creek
  - Myrtle Creek
  - Clear Creek
  - Little South Fork Kilchis River
  - Washout Creek
  - School Creek
  - Sharp Creek
  - North Fork Kilchis River
  - South Fork Kilchis River
- Wilson River
  - Hall Slough
  - Slide Creek
  - Beaver Creek
  - Hughey Creek
    - Donaldson Creek
  - Tillison Creek
  - Little North Fork Wilson River
    - White Creek
    - George Creek
    - Shadow Creek
    - Blowout Creek
    - Berry Creek
      - Klahn Creek
- Trask River
  - Nolan Slough
  - Hoquarten Slough
  - Mill Creek
  - Green Creek
  - Hanenkrat Creek
  - Gold Creek
  - Cedar Creek
  - Panther Creek
  - Little Rock Creek
  - Trowbridge Creek
  - Hatchery Creek
  - Blue Ridge Creek
  - Burton Creek
  - Bill Creek
  - Samson Creek
  - Rowe Creek
  - North Fork Trask River
  - South Fork Trask River
- Tillamook River
  - Dick Creek
  - Memaloose Creek
  - Tomlinson Creek
  - Esther Creek
  - Fagan Creek
  - Anderson Creek
  - Beaver Creek
    - Bear Creek
  - Sutton Creek
  - Beasley Creek
  - Killam Creek
  - Fawcett Creek
  - Simmons Creek
  - Joe Creek
  - Munson Creek
  - Mills Creek
- Larson Creek
- Short Creek
- Baughman Creek
- Fall Creek
  - North Branch Fall Creek
- Hodgdon Creek
- O'Hara Creek
- Rice Creek
- Yager Creek
- Whiskey Creek
- Austin Creek
- Hathaway Creek
- Jackson Creek
- Jackson Creek
- Cape Creek
- Rover Creek
  - Big Medwine Creek
- Allen Creek
- Sand Creek
  - Reneke Creek
    - Beltz Creek
  - Gurtis Creek
  - Jewel Creek
  - Davis Creek
  - Andy Creek
- Miles Creek
- Nestucca River
  - Three Rivers
- Little Nestucca River
- Commons Creek
- Neskowin Creek
  - Kiwanda Creek
    - Hawk Creek
    - Butte Creek
  - Fall Creek
  - Prospect Creek
  - Jim Creek
  - Lewis Creek
  - Sloan Creek
  - Kingston Creek
  - Sutton Creek
- Chitwood Creek
- Cliff Creek
- Salmon River
  - Teal Creek
  - Crowley Creek
  - Rowdy Creek
  - Frazer Creek
  - Salmon Creek
  - Deer Creek
  - Willis Creek
  - Panther Creek
  - Bear Creek
    - Morton Creek
    - Southman Creek
    - Tarry Creek
    - McMullen Creek
  - Slick Rock Creek
  - Widow Creek
  - Alder Brook
  - Treat River
  - Deer Creek
  - Sulphur Creek
  - Prairie Creek
  - Indian Creek
  - Boulder Creek
  - Little Salmon River
- Logan Creek
- D River
  - Rock Creek
  - Thompson Creek
  - Devil River
- Agnes Creek
- Baldy Creek
- Schooner Creek
  - Fall Creek
  - North Fork Schooner Creek
  - South Fork Schooner Creek
- Drift Creek
  - Anderson Creek
  - Gordey Creek
  - Bluff Creek
  - Odell Creek
  - Quarry Creek
  - North Creek
  - Wildcat Creek
  - Sampson Creek
  - Smith Creek
  - Barn Creek
  - Fowler Creek
  - Nelson Creek
- Millport Slough
  - George Creek
  - Tony Creek
  - Bones Creek
- Siletz River
  - Anderson Creek
  - Barhaven Creek
  - Skunk Creek
  - Bear Creek
  - Reed Creek
  - Foster Creek
  - Butterfield Creek
  - Scare Creek
  - Stemple Creek
  - Townsend Creek
  - Skalada Creek
  - Roots Creek
  - Roy Creek
  - Misac Creek
  - Jaybird Creek
  - Cedar Creek
  - Wade Creek
  - Hough Creek
  - Reed Creek
  - Euchre Creek
  - Ojalla Creek
  - Thompson Creek
  - Spencer Creek
  - Tangerman Creek
  - Dewey Creek
  - Mill Creek
  - Baker Creek
  - Bentilla Creek
  - Scott Creek
  - Sam Creek
  - Rock Creek
  - Mill Creek
  - Baker Creek
  - Palmer Creek
  - Wildcat Creek
  - Wolfer Creek
  - Buck Creek
  - Sunshine Creek
  - Holman Creek
  - Elk Creek
  - Blind Creek
  - Gravel Creek
  - North Fork Siletz River
  - South Fork Siletz River
- Schoolhouse Creek
- Fogarty Creek
  - Salmon Creek
- Depoe Bay Creek
  - North Depoe Bay Creek
  - South Depoe Bay Creek
- Deadhorse Creek
- Rocky Creek
- Dope Creek
- Miner Creek
- Johnson Creek
- Spencer Creek
  - North Fork Spencer Creek
  - South Fork Spencer Creek
- Wade Creek
- Coal Creek
- Moolack Creek
- Schooner Creek
- Little Creek
  - Lucky Gap Creek
  - Big Creek
    - Jeffries Creek
      - Anderson Creek
    - Blattner Creek
- Yaquina River
  - Sallys Slough
  - King Slough
  - Parker Slough
  - McCaffery Slough
  - Poole Slough
  - Johnson Slough
  - Flesher Slough
  - Blind Slough
  - Boone Slough
  - Nute Slough
  - Montgomery Creek
  - Babcock Creek
  - Depot Slough
  - Olalla Slough
  - Mill Creek
  - Abbey Creek
  - Blair Creek
  - Big Elk Creek
  - Carlisle Creek
  - Little Carlisle Creek
  - Bear Creek
  - Martin Creek
  - Sloop Creek
  - Simpson Creek
  - Trapp Creek
  - Thornton Creek
  - Cougar Creek
  - Crystal Creek
  - Whitney Creek
  - Hayes Creek
  - Peterson Creek
  - Eddy Creek
  - Little Elk Creek
  - Trout Creek
  - Bales Creek
  - Buttermilk Creek
  - Bryant Creek
  - Stony Creek
  - Randall Creek
  - Davis Creek
  - Felton Creek
  - Young Creek
  - Humphrey Creek
  - Splide Creek
  - Little Yaquina River
    - Cedar Creek
  - Bailey Creek
- Henderson Creek
- Grant Creek
- Moore Creek
- Thiel Creek
- Lost Creek
- Beaver Creek
  - Tracy Creek
    - Pumphouse Creek
  - South Beaver Creek
    - Oliver Creek
    - Graves Creek
  - Simpson Creek
  - Bunnel Creek
  - Worth Creek
  - Elkhorn Creek
    - North Fork Elkhorn Creek
  - North Fork Beaver Creek
    - Bowers Creek
    - Peterson Creek
    - Lewis Creek
- Deer Creek
- Hill Creek
- Little Creek
- Squaw Creek
- Collins Creek
  - South Fork Collins Creek
- Fox Creek
- Buckley Creek
  - Friday Creek
  - Thursday Creek
- Alsea River
  - Lint Creek
    - Red River
  - Eckman Creek
  - Drift Creek
  - Constantine Creek
  - Southworth Creek
  - Arnold Creek
  - Risley Creek
  - Canal Creek
  - Squaw Creek
  - Mill Creek
  - Line Creek
  - Hatchery Creek
  - Slide Creek
  - Scott Creek
  - Schoolhouse Creek
  - Brush Creek
  - Grass Creek
  - Lake Creek
  - Five Rivers
    - Bear Creek
    - Elk Creek
    - Lobster Creek
      - Taylor Creek
      - McGlynn Creek
      - Crooked Creek
      - Phillips Creek
      - Camp Creek
      - Wilkinson Creek
      - Little Lobster Creek
        - Briar Creek
      - Preacher Creek
      - Martha Creek
      - Meadow Creek
      - Coal Bank Creek
      - Cook Creek
      - Bear Creek
      - East Fork Lobster Creek
      - South Fork Lobster Creek
    - Swamp Creek
    - Cascade Creek
    - Cherry Creek
    - Buck Creek
    - Cougar Creek
    - Crab Creek
    - Alder Creek
    - Crazy Creek
    - Green River
      - Ryan Creek
      - East Fork Green River
    - Fendall Creek
    - Cedar Creek
    - Summers Creek
    - Lord Creek
    - Prindel Creek
  - Butter Creek
  - Cedar Creek
  - Wolf Creek
  - Minotti Creek
  - Cow Creek
  - Fall Creek
  - Digger Creek
  - Benner Creek
  - Salmonberry Creek
  - Maltby Creek
  - Narrows Creek
  - Birch Creek
  - Schoolhouse Creek
  - Mill Creek
  - Roberts Creek
  - Cathcart Creek
  - North Fork Alsea River
    - Kiger Creek
    - Honey Grove Creek
    - Ryder Creek
    - Hayden Creek
    - Seeley Creek
    - Crooked Creek
    - Bailey Creek
    - Gravel Creek
    - Easter Creek
    - Slide Creek
    - Sweethome Creek
    - Klickitat Creek
    - Lake Creek
  - South Fork Alsea River
    - Bummer Creek
    - Headrick Creek
    - Cedar Creek
    - Table Creek
    - Dubuque Creek
    - Rock Creek
    - Blackberry Creek
    - Peak Creek
    - Fall Creek
    - Coleman Creek
    - Williams Creek
- Patterson Creek
- Little Creek
- Reynolds Creek
  - Big Creek
    - Dicks Fork
    - South Fork Big Creek
- Vingie Creek
- Starr Creek
- Mitchell Creek
- Yachats River
  - Salmon Creek
  - Reedy Creek
  - Marks Creek
  - South Beamer Creek
  - Beamer Creek
  - Dawson Creek
  - Carson Creek
  - Clear Creek
  - Bend Creek
  - Werner Creek
  - Helms Creek
  - Axtell Creek
  - North Fork Yachats River
  - Neiglick Creek
  - Stump Creek
  - Keller Creek
  - School Fork
  - Grass Creek
- North Cape Creek
- Cape Creek
- Gwynn Creek
- Cummins Creek
  - Little Cummins Creek
- Nancy Creek
- Bob Creek
- Agate Creek
- Tenmile Creek
  - Mill Creek
  - McKinney Creek
  - South Fork
  - Wildcat Creek
- Tokatee Creek
- Nancy Creek
- Rock Creek
- Big Creek
  - Fryingpan Creek
  - Panther Creek
- China Creek
- Blowout Creek
- Cape Creek
  - Wapiti Creek
  - North Fork Cape Creek
- Horse Creek
- Berry Creek
  - Quarry Creek
- Sutton Creek
  - Mercer Creek
    - Levage Creek
    - Dahlin Creek
    - Bailey Creek
  - Mitchell Creek
  - Rath Creek
- Siuslaw River
  - South Slough
    - Demming Creek
  - North Fork Siuslaw River
    - Lindsley Creek
    - Slover Creek
    - Haring Creek
    - Morris Creek
    - Bellstrom Canyon
    - Culver Creek
    - Condon Creek
    - Jim Dick Creek
    - South Russell Creek
    - Russell Creek
    - Shumard Creek
    - Stout Creek
    - Stout Canyon
    - South Johns Creek
    - McLeod Creek
    - Cataract Creek
    - Drew Creek
    - Wilhelm Creek
    - Porter Creek
    - Deadman Creek
    - Taylor Creek
    - Cedar Creek
    - West Branch Sam Creek
    - Sam Creek
  - Skunk Hollow
  - Saubert Creek
  - Cox Creek
  - Prosser Slough
    - Schulte Creek
  - Duncan Inlet
    - Bernhardt Creek
    - Karnowski Creek
    - Peterson Creek
  - Wendson Canyon
  - Olsen Creek
  - Schoolhouse Creek
  - Hanson Creek
  - Hoffman Creek
  - David Creek
  - Mason Creek
  - Sweet Creek
    - Ellingson Creek
    - Cedar Creek
    - Elk Wallow Creek
    - Fall Creek
    - Beaver Creek
      - Deer Creek
    - South Canyon
    - Sheep Ranch Creek
    - Hand Creek
    - Lloyd Creek
    - South Fork Sweet Creek
  - Neilson Creek
  - Saunders Creek
  - Martin Creek
  - Hadsell Creek
    - Rice Creek
  - Rice Creek
  - Knowles Creek
    - Jackson Creek
    - Bridge Creek
    - Dinner Creek
    - Hood Creek
    - Sulphur Creek
  - Hollenbeck Creek
  - Lacey Creek
  - Snell Creek
  - Slide Gulch
  - Berkshire Creek
  - Walker Creek
  - Shoemaker Creek
  - Spencer Creek
  - Barber Creek
  - Wilson Creek
  - Thompson Creek
  - La Bar Creek
  - Cleveland Creek
  - Rock Canyon
  - Old Man Creek
  - Lake Creek
    - Indian Creek
      - Velvet Creek
      - Elk Creek
      - Cremo Creek
      - West Fork Indian Creek
      - Snoot Creek
      - Gibson Creek
      - Taylor Creek
      - Herman Creek
      - North Fork Indian Creek
    - Deadwood Creek
      - Green Creek
      - Boyle Creek
      - West Fork Deadwood Creek
      - Swartz Creek
      - Raleigh Creek
      - Bear Creek
        - South Fork Bear Creek
      - Deer Creek
      - Alpha Creek
      - Karlstrom Creek
      - Rock Creek
      - Buck Creek
      - Panther Creek
      - Elk Creek
      - Fawn Creek
    - Johnston Creek
    - Hollo Creek
    - Almasie Creek
    - Wilcut Creek
    - Nelson Creek
    - Wheeler Creek
    - Steinhauer Creek
    - Greenleaf Creek
    - Lamb Creek
    - Fish Creek
    - Spring Canyon Creek
    - Little Lake Creek
    - Pontiss Creek
    - Swamp Creek
    - Post Creek
    - Pope Creek
    - Conrad Creek
    - Village Creek
    - Swartz Creek
    - Congdon Creek
    - Billy Turner Canyon
  - Brush Creek
    - East Fork Brush Creek
  - Tilden Creek
  - Barber Creek
  - Pat Creek
  - Little Beecher Creek
  - Beecher Creek
  - San Antone Creek
  - Sharon Creek
  - Dry Creek
  - Smith Creek
  - Meadow Creek
  - Rock Creek
  - Preston Creek
  - School House Creek
  - Turner Creek
  - Waite Creek
  - Sutherland Creek
  - Wildcat Creek
    - Fowler Creek
    - Pataha Creek
    - Schultz Creek
    - Kirk Creek
    - Walker Creek
    - Chickahominy Creek
    - Fish Creek
    - Bulmer Creek
    - Salt Creek
    - Warden Creek
  - Whittaker Creek
  - Wolf Creek
  - Leopold Creek
  - Cedar Creek
  - Fawn Creek
  - Pugh Creek
  - Trail Creek
  - North Creek
  - Mill Creek
  - Collins Creek
  - Haskins Creek
  - Larue Creek
  - Clay Creek
  - Edris Creek
  - Burntwood Creek
  - Bierce Creek
  - Johnson Creek
  - Layne Creek
  - Oxbow Creek
  - Bear Creek
  - Haight Creek
    - Shitten Creek
  - Camp Creek
  - Conger Creek
  - Pheasant Creek
  - Dogwood Creek
  - Holland Creek
  - Jeans Creek
  - Doe Hollow Creek
  - Fryingpan Creek
  - Bottle Creek
  - Buck Creek
  - Doe Creek
  - Russell Creek
  - Simpson Creek
  - Shaw Creek
  - Smith Creek
  - Little Sisuslaw Creek
  - Fawn Creek
  - Letz Creek
  - Douglas Creek
  - North Fork Siuslaw River
    - Farman Creek
    - Crow Creek
    - Norris Creek
    - Hawley Creek
  - South Fork Siuslaw River
    - Gardner Creek
    - Lucas Creek
    - Sandy Creek
    - Kelley Creek
    - Tucker Creek
    - Maxwell Creek
- Siltcoos River
  - Woahink Creek
    - Miller Creek
  - Lane Creek
  - Silver Creek
  - Fiddle Creek
    - Young Creek
    - King Creek
    - Alder Creek
    - Bear Creek
      - Deer Creek
    - Morris Creek
  - Maple Creek
    - Mills Creek
      - Johns Creek
    - Schrum Creek
    - Carle Creek
    - Roache Creek
    - Grant Creek
    - Carter Creek
    - Jordan Creek
    - Starks Creek
    - Stokes Creek
    - Ryder Creek
    - Buckwheat Creek
    - Henderson Creek
    - Coleman Creek
    - Shultz Creek
- Tahkenitch Creek
  - Elbow Lake Creek
  - Leitel Creek
    - Mallard Creek
  - John Sims Creek
  - Fivemile Creek
    - Perkins Creek
      - Patterson Creek
    - Harry Creek
    - Bell Creek
- Threemile Creek
- Umpqua River
  - Winchester Creek
  - Providence Creek
  - Scholfield Creek
  - Smith River
    - Butler Creek
    - Frantz Creek
    - Hudson Slough
    - Camp Seven Gulch
    - Otter Slough
    - Brainard Creek
    - Black Creek
    - Joyce Creek
    - Cassidy Creek
    - Noel Creek
    - Eslick Creek
    - Russian John Gulch
    - North Fork Smith River
      - Railroad Creek
      - Straddle Creek
      - Dry Creek
      - Johnson Creek
      - Edmonds Creek
      - McKinney Creek
      - Georgia Creek
      - Chapman Creek
      - Sulphur Creek
      - Harlan Creek
      - Paxton Creek
      - West Branch North Fork Smith River
      - Middle Fork North Fork Smith River
      - Kentucky Creek
      - Sheep Herder Creek
      - Jump Creek
    - Murphy Creek
    - Wasson Creek
    - Taylor Creek
    - Spencer Creek
    - Dailey Creek
    - Doe Creek
    - Fawn Creek
    - Buck Creek
    - Little Buck Creek
    - Bear Creek
    - Johnson Creek
    - Rachel Creek
    - Vincent Creek
    - West Fork Smith River
      - Coon Creek
      - Crane Creek
      - Moore Creek
      - Beaver Creek
      - Gold Creek
    - Scare Creek
    - Blackwell Creek
    - Clearwater Creek
    - Carpenter Creek
    - Beaver Creek
    - North Sister Creek
    - South Sister Creek
    - Devils Club Creek
    - Marsh Creek
    - Rock Creek
    - Blind Creek
    - Mosetown Creek
    - Halfway Creek
    - Clabber Creek
    - Slideout Creek
    - Johnson Creek
    - Cleghorn Creek
    - Hardenbrook Creek
    - Yellow Creek
    - Deer Creek
    - Huckleberry Creek
    - Haney Creek
    - Panther Creek
    - Amberson Creek
    - Salmonberry Creek
    - South Fork Smith River
    - Arthur Jones Creek
    - Elk Creek
    - Beaver Creek
    - Clevenger Creek
    - Plank Creek
    - Hefty Creek
    - Summit Creek
    - Hall Creek
    - Redford Creek
    - Peterson Creek
    - Tip Davis Creek
    - Sleezer Creek
    - Watering Trough Creek
    - Alder Creek
    - Whiskey Creek
    - Spring Creek
  - Dean Creek
  - Harvey Creek
  - Indian Charlie Creek
  - Franklin Creek
  - Charlotte Creek
  - Luder Creek
  - Mill Creek
  - Little Mill Creek
  - Wells Creek
  - Golden Creek
  - Burchard Creek
  - Weatherly Creek
  - Lutsinger Creek
  - Butler Creek
  - Scott Creek
  - Little Stony Brook Creek
  - Stony Brook Creek
  - Paradise Creek
  - Sawyer Creek
  - Gould Creek
  - Beener Creek
  - Hart Creek
  - Grubbe Creek
  - Elk Creek
    - Little Tom Folley Creek
    - Hancock Creek
    - Big Tom Folley Creek
      - Saddle Butte Creek
      - North Fork Tom Folley Creek
    - Brush Creek
    - Indian Creek
    - Lancaster Creek
    - Parker Creek
    - Jack Creek
      - Johney Creek
    - Hardscrabble Creek
    - Billy Creek
      - Bear Creek
      - East Fork Billy Creek
      - Andrews Creek
      - South Fork Billy Creek
        - Flagler Creek
    - Post Creek
    - Pass Creek
      - Hedrick Creek
      - Krewson Creek
      - Johnson Creek
      - Fitch Creek
      - Ellenburg Creek
        - Little Sand Creek
        - Sand Creek
      - Rock Creek
      - Buck Creek
      - Pheasant Creek
      - Bear Creek
      - Ward Creek
    - Yoncalla Creek
      - Hanlon Creek
      - Halo Creek
      - Cowan Creek
      - Huntington Creek
      - Wilson Creek
    - Wise Creek
    - McClintock Creek
    - Asker Creek
    - Dodge Canyon
    - Wehmeyer Creek
    - Salt Creek
    - Cox Creek
      - Thief Creek
        - Curtis Creek
          - South Fork Curtis Creek
          - North Fork Curtis Creek
        - Lees Creek
    - Bennet Creek
    - Adams Creek
    - Walker Creek
    - Shingle Mill Creek
  - Heddin Creek
  - Fitzpatrick Creek
  - Mehl Creek
  - Whitehorse Creek
  - Williams Creek
  - Brads Creek
  - Martin Creek
  - Waggoner Creek
  - McGee Creek
  - Deep Gulch
  - Yellow Creek
  - Galagher Canyon
  - Lost Creek
  - Basin Creek
  - Leonard Creek
  - Powell Creek
  - Wolf Creek
  - Cougar Creek
  - Bottle Creek
  - Rock Creek
  - Hubbard Creek
  - Mill Creek
  - Calapooya Creek
    - Burke Creek
    - Coon Creek
    - Dodge Canyon Creek
    - Cook Creek
    - Cabin Creek
    - Pollock Creek
    - Oldham Creek
    - Foster Creek
    - Banks Creek
    - Long Valley Creek
    - Pelland Creek
    - Cantell Creek
    - Gassy Creek
    - Gilbreath Creek
    - Hinkle Creek
    - Jeffers Creek
    - Filler Creek
    - Cooper Creek
    - Buzzard Roost Creek
    - Timothy Creek
    - Coon Creek
    - White Creek
    - North Fork Calapooya Creek
    - South Fork Calapooya Creek
  - Hidden Valley Creek
  - North Umpqua River
    - Sutherlin Creek
    - Dixon Creek
    - Clover Creek
    - Oak Creek
    - Cooper Creek
    - Huntley Creek
    - Fordice Creek
    - Little River
      - Buckthorn Creek
      - Fall Creek
      - Williams Creek
      - Rattlesnake Creek
      - Eagles Creek
      - Jim Creek
      - Cavitt Creek
        - Evans Creek
        - McKay Creek
        - Buckshot Creek
        - Buck Peak Creek
          - Boulder Creek
        - Copperhead Creek
        - White Rock Creek
        - Mill Creek
        - Springer Creek
        - Tuttle Creek
        - Liveoak Creek
        - Cultus Creek
          - Plusfour Creek
        - Withrow Creek
      - Bond Creek
      - Boundary Creek
      - Greenman Creek
      - Wolf Creek
        - Egglestron Creek
        - West Fork Wolf Creek
      - Little Creek
      - Shivigny Creek
      - Emile Creek
      - Negro Creek
      - White Creek
      - Poore Creek
      - Little Taft Creek
      - Black Creek
        - Dutch Creek
      - Clover Creek
        - Flat Rock Branch
      - Taft Creek
      - Cedar Creek
      - Pinnacle Creek
      - Junction Creek
      - Hemlock Creek
    - French Creek
    - Old Hatchery Creek
    - Britt Creek
    - Rock Creek
    - Hill Creek
    - Clay Creek
    - Honey Creek
    - Bob Creek
    - Hogback Creek
    - Susan Creek
    - Cole Creek
    - Fox Creek
    - Swamp Creek
    - Burnt Creek
    - Thunder Creek
    - Fall Creek
    - Fairview Creek
    - Raspberry Creek
    - Wright Creek
    - John Creek
    - Bogus Creek
    - Cougar Creek
    - Archie Creek
    - Timber Creek
    - Williams Creek
    - Fisher Creek
    - Alder Creek
    - Steamboat Creek
    - Redman Creek
    - Jack Creek
    - Apple Creek
    - Limpy Creek
    - Dog Creek
    - Calf Creek
    - Happy Creek
    - Dry Creek
    - Dry Gulch
    - Deception Creek
    - Wilson Creek
    - Dark Canyon
    - Copeland Creek
    - Eagle Creek
    - Boulder Creek
    - Medicine Creek
    - Fish Creek
    - Clearwater River
    - Deer Creek
    - Loafer Creek
    - Charlia Creek
    - Alvin Creek
    - Patricia Creek
    - Barkenburger Creek
    - Nurse Creek
    - Potter Creek
    - Sally Creek
    - Dorothy Creek
    - Norma Creek
    - Helen Creek
    - Beverly Creek
    - Nancy Creek
    - Warm Spring Creek
    - White Mule Creek
    - Poole Creek
    - Lake Creek
      - Thielsen Creek
      - Sheep Creek
      - Two Bear Creek
      - Spruce Creek
      - Rabbit Creek
      - Porcupine Creek
      - Camp Creek
      - Short Creek
      - Silent Creek
    - Spring River
      - Thirsty Creek
    - Bradley Creek
    - Tolo Creek
  - South Umpqua River
    - Champagne Creek
      - Elgarose Creek
        - Callahan Creek
          - Doerner Creek
          - Dysert Creek
        - Willow Creek
    - Stockel Creek
    - Newton Creek
    - Deer Creek
      - DaMotta Branch
      - Shick Creek
      - North Fork Deer Creek
        - Livingston Creek
        - Rose Creek
      - South Fork Deer Creek
        - Tucker Creek
          - Melton Creek
        - Middle Fork of South Fork Deer Creek
    - Parrott Creek
    - Roberts Creek
      - North Fork Roberts Creek
    - Marsters Creek
    - Lookingglass Creek
      - Applegate Creek
      - Morgan Creek
        - Flourny Creek
        - Rock Creek
      - Larson Creek
      - Olalla Creek
        - Perron Creek
        - McNabb Creek
          - Weaver Creek
        - Berry Creek
          - Coarse Gold Creek
          - Bear Creek
        - Byron Creek
          - East Fork Byron Creek
          - North Fork Byron Creek
        - Bushnell Creek
        - Thompson Creek
        - Wildcat Creek
        - Willingham Creek
      - Tenmile Creek
        - Porter Creek
        - Irwin Creek
        - Shields Creek
          - Suicide Creek
            - Little Muley Creek
            - Muns Creek
        - Bear Creek
        - Wilson Creek
    - Brockway Creek
    - Kent Creek
      - Squaw Creek
      - Adams Creek
      - Alberson Creek
    - Rice Creek
      - Porter Creek
      - Barrett Creek
    - Willis Creek
      - East Willis Creek
      - West Willis Creek
    - Clark Branch
      - Richardson Creek
    - Van Dine Creek
    - Myrtle Creek
      - North Myrtle Creek
        - Bilger Creek
        - Little Lick Creek
        - Big Lick Creek
        - Frozen Creek
          - West Fork Frozen Creek
        - Slide Creek
        - Lee Creek
        - Buck Fork Creek
      - South Myrtle Creek
        - Cedar Hollow
        - School Hollow
        - Ben Branch
        - Louis Creek
        - Short Wiley Creek
        - Long Wiley Creek
        - Letitia Creek
        - Weaver Creek
        - Lally Creek
        - Johnson Creek
        - Curtin Creek
    - Cow Creek
      - Shoestring Creek
        - Mitchell Creek
          - Veatch Creek
          - Copper Creek
      - Jerry Creek
      - Russell Creek
      - Catching Creek
      - Council Creek
      - Crawford Branch
      - Squaw Creek
      - Beatty Creek
      - Rattlesnake Creek
      - Alder Creek
      - Island Creek
      - Salt Creek
      - Doe Creek
        - Cookhouse Creek
        - Little Doe Creek
      - Buck Creek
      - Minnie Creek
      - Polan Creek
      - Smith Creek
      - Iron Mountain Creek
      - Table Creek
      - Little Dads Creek
      - Cattle Creek
      - Calf Creek
      - Corral Creek
      - Union Creek
        - Staircase Creek
        - Dribble Creek
        - Live Oak Creek
          - Manzanita Creek
      - Short Creek
      - Stanchion Creek
      - Darby Creek
        - North Fork Darby Creek
        - West Fork Darby Creek
      - Dutchman Creek
      - West Fork Cow Creek
        - Jacob Creek
        - Bear Creek
        - Goat Trail Creek
        - Honeysuckle Creek
        - Slotted Pen Creek
        - Hayes Creek
        - Soldier Creek
        - Sweat Creek
        - No Sweat Creek
        - Bobby Creek
        - Elk Valley Creek
        - Panther Creek
        - Gold Mountain Creek
          - Lipp Creek
          - Johnston Creek
          - Smith Creek
          - Kleiner Creek
        - Walker Creek
          - Wallace Creek
        - Slide Creek
        - Stanley Creek
        - Black Creek
        - Grant Creek
        - Bear Creek
        - Wilson Creek
        - Bolivar Creek
        - Fuller Creek
- Tenmile Creek
  - Saunders Creek
  - Eel Creek
    - Clear Creek
  - Big Creek
    - Blacks Creek
      - Parker Creek
    - Murphy Creek
    - Wilkins Creek
    - Noble Creek
  - Adams Creek
    - Shutter Creek
  - Johnson Creek
    - Robertson Creek
    - Roberts Creek
    - Hatchery Creek
  - Copple Creek
  - Benson Creek
- Coos River
  - Catching Slough
  - Lillian Creek
  - Vogel Creek
  - Noah Creek
  - Millicoma River
    - Matt Davis Creek
    - Hendrickson Creek
    - Deton Creek
    - Woodruff Creek
    - East Fork Millicoma River
      - Nowlit Creek
      - Marlow Creek
      - Hodges Creek
      - Rodine Creek
      - Glenn Creek
      - Fox Creek
      - Little Matson Creek
      - Beulah Creek
    - West Fork Millicoma River
      - Rainy Creek
      - Daggett Creek
      - Totten Creek
      - Schumacher Creek
      - Trout Creek
      - Buck Creek
      - Joes Creek
      - Otter Creek
      - Deer Creek
      - Knife Creek
      - Elk Creek
      - Fish Creek
      - Panther Creek
      - Kelly Creek
      - Cougar Creek
  - South Fork Coos River
    - Morgan Creek
    - Rogers Creek
    - Bessey Creek
    - McKnight Creek
    - Salmon Creek
    - West Creek
    - East Creek
    - Big Creek
    - Cox Creek
    - Burma Creek
    - Rock Crusher Creek
    - Elk Creek
    - Fannin Creek
    - Coal Creek
    - Fall Creek
    - Mink Creek
    - Tioga Creek
    - Williams River
      - Bottom Creek
      - Skip Creek
      - Cedar Creek
      - Cabin Creek
      - Fall Creek
      - Gooseberry Gulch
      - Bear Gulch
      - Panther Creek
      - Fivemile Creek
      - Wilson Creek
      - Little Cow Creek
      - Lost Creek
- Miner Creek
- Big Creek
- First Creek
- Cave Creek
- Mussel Creek
- Fivemile Creek
- Threemile Creek
- Twomile Creek
- Whisky Run
- Cut Creek
  - South Branch Cut Creek
  - Polly Creek
- Coquille River
  - Ferry Creek
  - Simpson Creek
  - Spring Creek
  - Peterson Gulch
  - Fahys Creek
  - Sevenmile Creek
  - Offield Creek via Randolph Slough
  - Bear Creek
  - Lowe Creek
  - Lampa Creek
  - Alder Creek
  - Hatchet Slough
  - Iowa Slough
  - Beaver Slough
  - China Creek
  - Calloway Creek
  - Fat Elk Creek
  - Rink Creek
  - Pulaski Creek
  - Glen Aiken Creek
  - Fishtrap Creek
  - Gray Creek
  - Hall Creek
  - Grady Creek
- North Fork Coquille River
  - Llewellyn Creek
  - Carey Creek
  - Kessler Creek
  - Johns Creek
  - East Fork Coquille River
    - Weekly Creek
    - Elk Creek
    - Yankee Run
    - Hantz Creek
    - Steel Creek
    - Bills Creek
    - China Creek
    - Brummit Creek
    - Camas Creek
    - Dead Horse Creek
    - Lost Creek
    - Knapper Creek
  - Wimer Creek
  - Wood Creek
  - Garage Creek
  - Schoolhouse Creek
  - Lost Creek
  - Blair Creek
  - Steele Creek
  - Evans Creek
  - Swayne Creek
  - Hudson Creek
  - Moon Creek
  - Whilley Creek
  - Neeley Creek
  - Giles Creek
  - North Fork Creek
  - Little North Fork Coquille River
- South Fork Coquille River
  - Middle Fork Coquille River
    - Mill Creek
    - Indian Creek
    - Endicott Creek
    - McMullen Creek
    - King Creek
    - Big Creek
    - Salmon Creek
    - Myrtle Creek
    - Belieu Creek
    - Tanner Creek
    - Frenchie Creek
    - Sandy Creek
      - Fetter Creek
    - Slide Creek
    - Upper Rock Creek
    - Lake Creek
    - Panther Creek
    - Slater Creek
    - Bear Creek
    - Twelvemile Creek
    - Mystic Creek
    - Bingham Creek
    - Mill Creek
    - Day Creek
    - Jim Belieu Creek
    - Reed Creek
    - Bar Creek
    - Wildcat Creek
    - Lang Creek
    - Cole Creek
    - Lake Creek
    - Estes Creek
- Tupper Creek
- Johnson Creek
  - Rosa Creek
- Crooked Creek
- China Creek
- Twomile Creek
  - South Twomile Creek
    - Lower Twomile Creek
  - Redibaugh Creek
- New River
  - Fourmile Creek
    - Spring Creek
    - Jenny Creek
    - South Fork Fourmile Creek
      - Long Creek
    - Little Creek
    - North Fourmile Creek
  - Davis Creek
    - Conner Creek
  - Butte Creek
    - Bethel Creek
    - Mill Creek
  - Morton Creek
  - Langlois Creek
  - Floras Creek
    - Willow Creek
    - Jim Creek
    - Joe Cox Creek
    - Jenny Creek
    - Johnson Creek
    - Clear Creek
    - West Fork Floras Creek
    - North Fork Floras Creek
      - Horner Creek
      - Guerin Creek
      - East Fork Floras Creek
        - Huff Creek
        - Crutchfield Creek
        - White Rock Creek
      - Williams Creek
    - South Fork Floras Creek
      - Dwyer Creek
  - Boulder Creek
- Sixes River
  - Sullivan Gulch
  - Crystal Creek
  - Beaver Creek
  - Jenny Creek
  - Koch Creek
  - Edson Creek
  - Dry Creek
    - Duvall Creek
    - Grassy Creek
    - North Fork Dry Creek
  - Pipeline Creek
  - Little Dry Creek
  - Elephant Rock Creek
  - South Fork Sixes River
  - Otter Creek
  - Big Creek
  - Middle Fork Sixes River
  - Sucker Creek
  - Sugar Creek
  - North Fork Sixes River
  - Haines Creek
  - Murphy Canyon
- Elk River
  - Indian Creek
  - Bagley Creek
  - Small Creek
  - Rock Creek
  - Champman Creek
  - Coon Creek
  - Anvil Creek
  - Bear Creek
    - Bald Mountain Creek
      - South Fork Bald Mountain Creek
  - Platinum Creek
  - State Creek
  - Red Cedar Creek
    - Stan Creek
  - Sunshine Creek
  - Panther Creek
    - West Fork Panther Creek
    - East Fork Panther Creek
    - Mid Fork Panther Creek
  - Lost Creek
  - Butler Creek
  - Milbury Creek
  - Bungalow Creek
  - Blackberry Creek
  - McCurdy Creek
  - North Fork Elk River
    - Slide Creek
  - South Fork Elk River
- Gold Run Creek
- Hubbard Creek
  - North Fork Hubbard Creek
- Rocky Creek
- Rocky Point Creek
- Retz Creek
- Brush Creek
  - Dry Run Creek
  - Bear Creek
  - Beartrap Creek
- Reinhart Creek
- Mussel Creek
  - Myrtle Creek
- O'Brien Creek
- Euchre Creek
  - Cedar Creek
    - Rock Creek
    - Miller Creek
  - Boulder Creek
  - Crew Canyon Creek
  - Crooked Bridge Creek
- Greggs Creek
- Parker Creek
- Rogue River
  - Dean Creek
  - Indian Creek
  - Edson Creek
  - Squaw Creek
  - Jim Hunt Creek
  - Libby Creek
  - Kimball Creek
  - Abe Creek
  - Lobster Creek
    - Deadline Creek
    - Fall Creek
    - Lost Valley Creek
    - North Fork Lobster Creek
    - South Fork Lobster Creek
      - Iron Creek
      - Boulder Creek
  - William Miller Creek
  - Quosantana Creek
  - Silver Creek
  - Little Silver Creek
  - Bill Moore Creek
  - Slide Creek
  - Dog Creek
  - Wakeup Rilea Creek
  - Auberry Creek
  - Tom East Creek
  - Schoolhouse Creek
  - Nail Keg Creek
  - Bridge Creek
  - Sundown Creek
  - Stonehouse Creek
  - Painted Rock Creek
  - Morris Rodgers Creek
  - Blue Jay Creek
  - Rilea Creek
  - Tom Fry Creek
  - Illinois River
  - Snout Creek
  - Shasta Costa Creek
  - Waters Creek
  - Slide Creek
  - Walker Creek
  - Twomile Creek
  - Lone Tree Creek
  - Billy Creek
  - Billings Creek
  - Watson Creek
  - Dans Creek
  - Slide Creek
  - Hicks Creek
  - Flora Dell Creek
  - Fall Creek
  - Clay Hill Creek
  - Tate Creek
  - Brushy Bar Creek
  - East Creek
  - Jackson Creek
  - Paradise Creek
  - Blossom Bar Creek
  - Burns Creek
  - Stair Creek
  - Mule Creek
  - Long Gulch
  - Quail Creek
  - Missouri Creek
  - Hewitt Creek
  - Slide Creek
  - Ditch Creek
  - Corral Creek
  - Dulog Creek
  - Meadow Creek
  - Cowley Creek
  - Copsey Creek
  - Francis Creek
  - Shady Creek
  - Jenny Creek
  - Little Windy Creek
  - Big Windy Creek
  - Bunker Creek
  - Bronco Creek
  - Howard Creek
  - Montgomery Creek
  - Russian Creek
  - Wildcat Creek
  - Alder Creek
  - Whisky Creek
  - Rum Creek
  - China Gulch
  - Singletree Gulch
  - Ajax Gulch
  - Grave Creek
    - Reuben Creek
    - Rock Creek
    - McNair Creek
    - McNabe Creek
    - Poorman Creek
    - Fall Creek
    - Reservoir Creek
    - Panther Creek
    - Butte Creek
    - Wolf Creek
    - Tom East Creek
    - Brushy Gulch
    - Brimstone Gulch
    - Flume Gulch
    - Dog Creek
    - Mackin Gulch
    - Rat Creek
    - Salmon Creek
    - Schoolhouse Gulch
    - Shanks Creek
    - Benjamin Gulch
    - Tom East Creek
    - Quartz Mill Gulch
    - Eastman Gulch
    - Clark Creek
    - Boulder Creek
    - Baker Creek
    - Slate Creek
    - Little Boulder Creek
    - Big Boulder Creek
    - Last Chance Creek
    - Swamp Creek
    - Panther Creek
  - Smith Gulch
  - Mouse Creek
  - Smith Creek
  - Argo Creek
  - Bailey Creek
  - Yew Wood Creek
  - Centennial Gulch
  - Ash Gulch
  - North Star Gulch
  - Belknap Gulch
  - Hooks Gulch
  - Maple Gulch
  - Rocky Gulch
  - Rich Gulch
  - Galice Creek
  - Spangler Gulch
  - Paint Creek
  - Delta Creek
  - Taylor Creek
  - Stratton Creek
  - Little Zigzag Creek
  - Zigzag Creek
  - Serpentine Gulch
  - Hog Creek
  - Jumpoff Joe Creek
  - Pickett Creek
  - Rickett Creek
  - Shan Creek
  - Pass Creek
  - Applegate River
    - Slate Creek
      - Minnie Creek
      - Round Prairie Creek
        - South Fork Round Prairie Creek
      - Elliott Creek
      - Waters Creek
        - Salt Creek
        - Bear Creek
      - Welter Creek
      - Butcherknife Creek
        - Knight Creek
        - Love Creek
      - Ramsey Creek
      - Cedar Log Creek
      - Buckeye Creek
    - Cheney Creek
      - Little Cheney Creek
    - Bull Creek
    - Jackson Creek
    - Stringer Creek
    - Skunk Creek
    - Panther Creek
      - Mathiasen Creek
    - Iron Creek
    - Onion Creek
    - Murphy Creek
      - Dry Creek
      - Case Creek
      - Spencer Creek
    - Grays Creek
    - Board Shanty Creek
    - Wildcat Gulch
    - Johnston Creek
    - Oscar Creek
    - Black Canyon Creek
    - Dales Bluff Creek
    - Caris Creek
      - Miller Creek
      - Rocky Creek
      - Miners Creek
    - Hog Eye Creek
    - Slagle Creek
      - Wooldridge Creek
    - Williams Creek
      - Pennington Creek
      - Powell Creek
        - Camp Meeting Creek
        - Honeysuckle Creek
        - Wallow Creek
      - Water Gap Creek
    - Cove Creek
    - Ferris Gulch
    - Thompson Creek
    - Little Applegate River
      - Sterling Creek
      - Yale Creek
      - Glade Creek
      - McDonald Creek
    - Elliot Creek
  - Vannoy Creek
  - Sand Creek
  - Allen Creek
  - Fruitdale Creek
  - Jones Creek
  - Greens Creek
  - Rich Gulch
  - Savage Creek
  - Little Savage Creek
  - Evans Creek
    - Fielder Creek
      - Right Fork Fielder Creek
      - Left Fork Fielder Creek
    - Bear Branch
    - Pleasant Creek
    - Sykes Creek
    - May Creek
      - Faun Creek
    - West Fork Evans Creek
    - Spignet Creek
    - Morrison Creek
      - Musty Creek
    - Canon Creek
    - Chapman Creek
    - Coal Creek
    - Wolf Creek
    - Railroad Gap Creek
  - Ward Creek
  - Birdseye Creek
  - Foots Creek
  - Sardine Creek
  - Galls Creek
  - Water Gulch
  - Sams Creek
  - Middough Creek
  - Bear Creek
    - Jackson Creek
      - Dean Creek
      - Cantrall Creek
    - Griffin Creek
      - Murphy Creek
    - Crooked Creek
    - Lazy Creek
    - Larson Creek
    - Coleman Creek
    - Payne Creek
    - Anderson Creek
      - North Fork Anderson Creek
      - South Fork Anderson Creek
    - Kenutchen Creek
    - Wagner Creek
      - Holton Creek
      - Arrastra Creek
      - Goose Creek
    - Myer Creek
    - Butler Creek
    - Wrights Creek
    - Ashland Creek
      - East Fork Ashland Creek
      - West Fork Ashland Creek
    - Gaerky Creek
    - Clay Creek
    - Emigrant Creek
      - Walker Creek
        - Cove Creek
          - Dosier Creek
          - North Branch Cove Creek
            - Big Creek
          - South Branch Cove Creek
            - Prairie Branch Cover Creek
        - Frog Creek
          - Ice House Creek
            - Babe Creek
      - Hill Creek
        - Barron Creek
        - Slide Creek
        - Wall Creek
          - Viaduct Creek
      - Sampson Creek
        - Right Fork Sampson Creek
      - Carter Creek
      - Tyler Creek
        - Schoolhouse Creek
      - Baldy Creek
      - Green Mountain Creek
      - Porcupine Creek
    - Neil Creek
      - Tolman Creek
      - Clayton Creek
      - Y Creek
  - Whetstone Creek
    - Swanson Creek
  - Snider Creek
    - Molby Creek
  - Little Butte Creek
    - Antelope Creek
      - Dry Creek
      - Quarter Branch
      - Yankee Creek
        - Spring Creek
        - Hawkins Creek
    - Lick Creek
    - Salt Creek
    - Joint System Canal
    - Lake Creek
    - South Fork Little Butte Creek
      - Lost Creek
        - Coon Creek
      - Dead Indian Creek
      - Beaver Dam Creek
    - North Fork Little Butte Creek
  - Constance Creek
  - Hog Creek
  - Reese Creek
    - North Fork Reese Creek
    - South Fork Reese Creek
      - Bull Run Creek
      - Neil Creek
  - Dry Creek
  - Langel Creek
  - Branch Creek
  - Long Branch
  - Indian Creek
    - Deer Creek
  - Cricket Creek
  - Trail Creek
    - Canyon Creek
    - West Fork Trail Creek
      - Kendale Creek
      - Paradise Creek
      - Romine Creek
      - Walpole Creek
      - Chicago Creek
    - Buck Rock Creek
    - Wall Creek
      - Dead Horse Creek
    - Clear Creek
  - Lewis Creek
  - Brush Creek
  - Bush Creek
  - Elk Creek
    - Berry Creek
    - West Branch Elk Creek
      - Spot Creek
      - Morine Creek
        - Hungry Creek
    - Alco Creek
    - Middle Creek
    - Flat Creek
    - Shell Creek
    - Jones Creek
    - Sugarpine Creek
      - Hawk Creek
        - Elkhorn Creek
          - Pelt Creek
        - Timber Creek
      - Kettle Creek
      - Coalmine Creek
    - Dodes Creek
    - Button Creek
      - Squaw Creek
      - Alder Creek
    - Bitter Lick Creek
    - Swanson Creek
    - Brush Creek
  - Big Butte Creek
    - Vine Creek
    - Clark Creek
      - North Fork Clark Creek
      - South Fork Clark Creek
    - McNeil Creek
      - Neil Creek
        - Quartz Creek
      - Cattail Creek
      - Geppert Creek
    - Dog Creek
    - Box Creek
    - North Fork Big Butte Creek
      - Eighty Acre Creek
      - Friese Creek
      - Jackass Creek
      - Mule Creek
        - Horseshoe Creek
      - Camp Creek
      - Phillips Creek
      - Cedar Springs Creek
    - Hukill Creek
    - Ginger Creek
    - Doubleday Creek
    - Bowen Creek
      - Richard Creek
    - Willow Creek
      - Ash Creek
        - East Fork Ash Creek
        - West Fork Ash Creek
      - Horse Creek
      - Skeeters Creek
      - Duel Creek
        - Bieberstedt Creek
          - North Fork Bieberstedt Creek
          - South Fork Bieberstedt Creek
      - East Branch Willow Creek
      - West Branch Willow Creek
        - Walch Creek
        - Buck Point Creek
          - Nork Creek
        - Farva Creek
    - South Fork Big Butte Creek
      - Fourbit Creek
        - North Fork Fourbit Creek
          - Buck Basin Fork
            - Gypsy Fork
        - South Fork Fourbit Creek
          - Beaver Fork
      - Clarks Fork Creek
        - South Fork Clarks Fork Creek
      - Rancheria Creek
        - Fireline Creek
          - Deception Creek
        - Titanic Creek
      - Twincheria Creek
        - Misfit Creek
  - Lost Creek
  - Rumley Creek
  - Blue Gulch
  - Floras Creek
    - Diamond Creek
  - Knighten Creek
  - Taggarts Creek
  - Tie Creek
  - Hole in the Ground Creek
  - Cold Spring Creek
  - Middle Creek
  - Hurd Creek
  - South Fork Rogue River
    - Smith Creek
    - Ash Creek
    - Beaver Dam Creek
      - Round Mountain Creek
      - Crane Creek
      - Parsnip Creek
        - Cur Creek
      - Vine Maple Creek
        - South Fork Vine Maple Creek
    - Middle Fork Rogue River
      - Red Blanket Creek
        - Lick Creek
        - Varmint Creek
      - Daniel Creek
      - Svinth Creek
      - Twentynine Creek
      - Gyppo Creek
        - Bessie Creek
          - Fire Creek
          - Fall Creek
          - Kerby Creek
      - Foot Creek
      - Halifax Creek
      - Honeymoon Creek
    - Buck Creek
      - Geppert Creek
    - Imnaha Creek
      - Sumpter Creek
        - Wallowa Creek
          - North Fork Wallowa Creek
          - South Fork Wallowa Creek
        - Whitman Creek
          - Spring Creek
    - Lodgepole Creek
    - Green Creek
    - Nichols Creek
    - Big Ben Creek
      - Frey Creek
      - Fantail Creek
    - Sam Creek
    - Wickiup Creek
    - Little Billie Creek
    - Parker Creek
  - Skookum Creek
  - Barr Creek
  - Mill Creek
    - Ginkgo Creek
      - Coffee Creek
      - Dead Soldier Creek
    - North Fork Mill Creek
      - Pipeline Creek
  - Schoolma'am Creek
  - Graham Creek
  - Lund Creek
  - Deep Creek
  - Larson Creek
  - Kiter Creek
    - Needle Creek
    - Cedar Creek
  - Jim Creek
    - Hop Creek
      - Top Creek
    - Littlemile Creek
  - Abbott Creek
    - Woodruff Creek
    - Little Sunshine Creek
      - Red Fir Creek
    - Sunshine Creek
    - McCall Creek
    - North Fork Abbott Creek
    - West Fork Abbott Creek
      - DeWitt Creek
  - Flat Creek
    - Travail Creek
  - Union Creek
    - Crawford Creek
    - Grouse Creek
  - Castle Creek
    - North Fork Castle Creek
    - Little Castle Creek
    - Trapper Creek
    - Dutton Creek
  - Bybee Creek
    - Rock Creek
      - Deer Creek
  - Browns Creek
  - Bridge Creek
  - Prairie Creek
  - Foster Creek
    - Hershberger Creek
      - Rabbitear Creek
    - Wiley Creek
    - Log Creek
  - Copeland Creek
    - North Fork Copeland Creek
    - Middle Fork Copeland Creek
    - South Fork Copeland Creek
  - Wizard Creek
    - Crater Creek
      - Bert Creek
        - Bill Creek
  - National Creek
    - Falls Creek
    - Beartree Creek
    - South Fork National Creek
    - Middle Fork National Creek
  - Lost Creek
  - Meadow Creek
  - Hurryon Creek
  - Muir Creek
    - Rock Creek
    - Alkali Creek
    - East Fork Muir Creek
      - Sherwood Creek
    - Ice Creek
    - West Fork Muir Creek
  - Hamaker Creek
  - Minnehaha Creek
  - Mazama Creek
  - Cascade Creek
- Riley Creek
  - North Fork Riley Creek
  - Middle Fork Riley Creek
    - South Fork Riley Creek
- Cunniff Creek
  - East Fork Cunniff Creek
  - West Fork Cunniff Creek
- Thompson Creek
- Antone Creek
- Hunter Creek
  - Turner Creek
  - Taylor Creek
  - Yorke Creek
  - Smith Creek
  - Crossen Creek
  - Conn Creek
    - Hafner Creek
  - Little South Fork Hunter Creek
  - Big South Fork Hunter Creek
  - North Fork Hunter Creek
  - Elko Creek
- Daniels Creek
- Egans Creek
- Myers Creek
  - North Fork Myers Creek
- Pistol River
  - McKinley Creek
  - Crook Creek
  - Glade Creek
  - Deep Creek
  - South Fork Pistol River
  - Sunrise Creek
  - North Fork Pistol River
  - East Fork Pistol River
  - Meadow Creek
- Sand Creek
  - Hidden Creek
- Burnt Hill Creek
- Whiskey Creek
- Hooskanaden Creek
- Miner Creek
- Wridge Creek
- Dunning Creek
- Horse Prairie Creek
- Spruce Creek
- China Creek
- Thomas Creek
- Bruces Bones Creek
- Whalehead Creek
  - South Fork Whalehead Creek
- Coon Creek
- Bowman Creek
- House Rock Creek
- Lone Ranch Creek
  - Duley Creek
- Ram Creek
- Taylor Creek
- Shy Creek
- Harris Creek
- Eiler Creek
- Ransom Creek
- Macklyn Creek
- Chetco River
  - North Fork Chetco River
  - South Fork Chetco River
  - Boulder Creek
  - Tincup Creek
  - Box Canyon Creek
  - Babyfoot Creek
  - Little Chetco River
    - Henry Creek
    - Ditch Creek
    - Copper Creek
    - Henry Creek
- Tuttle Creek
- Stack Creek
- O'Loughlin Gulch
- Johnson Creek
- McVay Creek
- Cooley Creek
- Winchuck River

→ North Fork Smith River (originates in Oregon and drains into Smith River in California)

  - Stony Creek
  - Still Creek
  - Diamond Creek
  - Cedar Creek
  - Fall Creek
  - Baldface Creek
  - Packsaddle Creek
  - Hardrock Creek
  - Chrome Creek
  - Horse Creek
- Klamath River (enters the Pacific Ocean in California)
  - Lost River
  - Link River
    - Wood River
      - Crooked Creek
      - Fort Creek
      - Annie Creek
        - Sun Creek
          - Vidae Creek
        - East Fork
        - Middle Fork
        - Pole Bridge Creek
        - Munson Creek
        - Goodbye Creek
    - Fourmile Creek
      - Seldom Creek
      - Lost Creek
        - Long Creek
      - Horse Creek
      - Swan Creek
    - Recreation Creek
    - Crystal Creek
      - Rock Creek
        - Penn Creek
    - Thomason Creek
      - West Fork Thomason Creek
      - Fourmile Creek
        - Crane Creek
          - Threemile Creek
        - Cherry Creek
          - Nannie Creek
      - Sevenmile Creek
        - Short Creek
    - Williamson River
      - Sprague River
        - Sycan River
          - Snake Creek
          - Blue Creek
          - Merritt Creek
          - Long Creek
          - Paradise Creek
          - Currier Creek
          - Skull Creek
          - Rifle Creek
          - Cummings Creek
          - Nixon Creek
          - Kelly Creek
          - Rock Creek
          - South Fork Sycan River
          - Boulder Creek
        - North Fork Sprague River
        - South Fork Sprague River

=== Alvord Lake ===
List is of rivers that flow into Alvord Lake, a lake with no outflows.

- Wildhorse Creek
  - Miranda Creek
  - Juniper Creek
  - Buttes Creek
  - Andrews Creek
  - Wilson Creek
  - Spring Creek
  - Stonehouse Creek
  - Deppy Creek
  - Willow Spring Creek
  - Willow Creek
  - Little Wildhorse Creek

=== Carter Lake ===
List is of rivers that flow into Carter Lake, a lake with no outflows.

- Carter Lake Creek

=== Cleawox Lake ===
List is of rivers that flow into Cleawox Lake, a lake with no outflows.

- Buck Creek

=== Hart Lake ===
List is of rivers that flow into Hart Lake, a lake with no outflows. Order of mouths is alphabetical while tributary structures are of increasing distance from the mouth.

- Deep Creek
  - Squaw Creek
  - Drake Creek
    - Parsnip Creek
      - Peddlers Creek
  - Camas Creek
    - Sage Hen Creek
      - Crane Creek
    - Little Parsnip Creek
    - Blue Creek
    - Mud Creek
      - Porcupine Creek
  - Horse Creek
  - Burnt Creek
  - Willow Creek
  - Polander Creek
  - Dismal Creek
  - North Fork Deep Creek
  - Middle Fork Deep Creek
    - Mosquito Creek
  - South Fork Deep Creek
- Honey Creek
  - Twelvemile Creek
    - McDowell Creek
      - Suipe Creek
      - North Fork McDowell Creek
      - South Fork McDowell Creek
  - Deppy Creek
  - Snyder Creek
    - Colvin Creek
    - South Fork Snyder Creek
  - Clover Creek
  - Dent Creek
  - Little Honey Creek
  - First Swale Creek
  - Second Swale Creek
  - Long John Creek
  - Sage Creek

=== Lake Abert ===
List is of rivers that flow into Lake Abert, a lake with no outflows. Order of tributary structure is of increasing distance from the mouth.

- Chewaucan River
  - Crooked Creek
    - Moss Creek
    - Jones Creek
      - Dicks Creek
    - Loveless Creek
    - Parker Creek
    - Little Cove Creek
    - Big Cove Creek
    - North Fork Crooked Creek
    - South Fork Crooked Creek
      - Middle Fork Crooked Creek

=== Lake Marie ===
List is of rivers that flow into Lake Marie, a lake with no outflows.

- Marie Creek

=== Malheur Lake ===
List is of rivers that flow into Malheur Lake, a lake with no outflows. Order of mouths is alphabetical while tributary structures are of increasing distance from the mouth.

- Donner und Blitzen River
  - Swamp Creek
    - Kiger Creek
      - Cucamonga Creek
      - Poison Creek
      - Little Kiger Creek
      - Mud Creek
      - Big Pasture Creek
  - Little Blitzen River
- East Fork Silvies River
- West Fork Silvies River
  - Silvies River

=== Quinn River Sink (Nevada) ===
List is of rivers in Oregon that drain into Nevada's Quinn River, which drains into the Quinn River Sink in the Black Rock Desert, also in Nevada. Order is by increasing distance from the mouth of the Quinn River.

- Kings River
- East Fork Quinn River

=== Summer Lake ===
List is of rivers that flow into Summer Lake, a lake with no outflows.

- Ana River

== See also ==
- List of canals in Oregon (A-L) and List of canals in Oregon (M-Z)
- List of lakes in Oregon
- List of longest streams of Oregon
- List of National Wild and Scenic Rivers#Oregon
- Lists of Oregon-related topics
- List of rivers in the United States
- List of rivers of the Americas by coastline
- List of shoals of Oregon
