= Wind River (Oregon) =

- Location of the mouth of Wind River in Oregon

Location
- Country: United States
- State: Oregon
- County: Yamhill

Physical characteristics
- Source: Northern Oregon Coast Range
  - location: near Cherry Mountain
  - coordinates: 45°09′41″N 123°38′07″W
  - elevation: 1,097 ft (334 m)
- Mouth: Agency Creek
  - location: near Spirit Mountain
  - coordinates: 45°06′40″N 123°37′39″W
  - elevation: 404 ft (123 m)
- Length: 4 mi (6.4 km)

The Wind River is a stream in Yamhill County in the U.S. state of Oregon. The stream, about 4 miles (6 km) long, runs generally north–south through the Grand Ronde Community. Wind River enters Agency Creek, a tributary of the South Yamhill River, west of Spirit Mountain and north of Grand Ronde.

== See also ==
- List of rivers of Oregon
