= Shitten Creek =

- Location within Oregon

Location
- Country: United States
- State: Oregon
- County: Lane

Physical characteristics
- Source: Central Oregon Coast Range
  - location: Alma (vicinity)
  - coordinates: 43°52′00″N 123°28′40″W
- Mouth: Haight Creek (empties to Siuslaw River)
  - location: Alma (vicinity)
  - coordinates: 43°51′41″N 123°29′39″W
  - elevation: 574 ft (175 m)

Shitten Creek is a stream in Lane County, Oregon, in the United States.

According to one source, Shitten Creek's name may originally have been intended to warn of untreated sewage in the waters.

== See also ==
- List of rivers of Oregon
