= Little Willamette River =

- Location of the mouth of the Little Willamette River in Oregon

Location
- Country: United States
- State: Oregon
- County: Linn

Physical characteristics
- Source: Wetlands west of Albany
  - location: Gravel pit near the Willamette River
  - coordinates: 44°36′58″N 123°10′37″W
  - elevation: 199 ft (61 m)
- Mouth: Willamette River
  - location: Bowers Rock State Park
  - coordinates: 44°38′12″N 123°09′04″W
  - elevation: 177 ft (54 m)
- Length: 3 mi (4.8 km)

The Little Willamette River is a minor tributary of the Willamette River in Linn County in the U.S. state of Oregon. It begins in a gravel pit slightly east of the main stem in a bend of the larger river west of Albany. Flowing generally northeast and roughly parallel to the main stem for about 3 miles (5 km), it enters the Willamette about 121.5 miles (195.5 km) from the larger river's mouth on the Columbia River.

Along its lower course, the Little Willamette flows through Bowers Rock State Park, a 568-acre (230 ha) tract in a riparian forest. The park, largely undeveloped, with primitive trails and no amenities, is part of the Willamette Greenway. The only named tributary of the Little Willamette is Coon Creek, which enters from the left.

== See also ==
- List of rivers of Oregon
- Willamette Riverkeeper
