= Shitepoke Creek =

- Location of the mouth of Shitepoke Creek in Oregon

Location
- Country: United States
- State: Oregon
- County: Lane

Physical characteristics
- Source: Cascade Range
  - location: near Dead Mountain, Willamette National Forest
  - coordinates: 43°47′43″N 122°22′02″W
  - elevation: 2,972 ft (906 m)
- Mouth: Salmon Creek (Oregon)
  - location: east of Oakridge
  - coordinates: 43°46′41″N 122°21′36″W
  - elevation: 1,611 ft (491 m)

Shitepoke Creek is a short tributary of Salmon Creek, which is a tributary of the Middle Fork Willamette River in Lane County, Oregon, in the United States. Arising between Dead Mountain and Eagle Butte in the Cascade Range, it flows south into the creek about 7 miles (11 km) east of Oakridge. Its entire course lies within the Willamette National Forest.

Shitepoke is said by the author of From Squaw Tit to Whorehouse Meadow: How Maps Name, Claim, and Inflame to refer to a heron's tendency to defecate while flying. Merriam-Webster says that the word, a combination of shite and poke, refers to a heron's tendency to defecate when startled. Noting that the word shite "is not now in decent use", The Compact Edition of the Oxford English Dictionary (OED) of 1971 defines shitepoke as "the small green heron of North America", Butorides virescens. The OED's usage example is: "gulls, shitepokes, cranes".

== See also ==
- List of rivers of Oregon
