= Three Rivers (Oregon) =

Location
- Country: United States
- State: Oregon
- County: Yamhill

Three Rivers is a stream in the U.S. state of Oregon, located in Yamhill County.

== See also ==
- List of rivers of Oregon
