= Smith River (McKenzie River tributary) =

- Location of the mouth of Smith River in Oregon

Location
- Country: United States
- State: Oregon
- County: Linn

Physical characteristics
- Source: Cascade Range
  - location: Willamette National Forest
  - coordinates: 44°22′41″N 122°04′20″W
  - elevation: 4,456 ft (1,358 m)
- Mouth: McKenzie River
  - location: Trail Bridge Reservoir
  - coordinates: 44°16′22″N 122°02′58″W
  - elevation: 2,090 ft (640 m)
- Discharge
  - location: above Smith Reservoir, 4.4 miles (7.1 km) from the mouth

Smith River is a tributary of the McKenzie River in Linn County in the U.S. state of Oregon. It begins near Browder Ridge in the Cascade Range and flows generally south through the Willamette National Forest to meet the larger river at Trail Bridge Reservoir, about 82 miles (132 km) upstream of the McKenzie's mouth on the Willamette River.

Three named tributaries enter Smith River, all from the right. From source to mouth, they are Gate, Browder, and Bunchgrass creeks.

== Lakes End campground ==
About halfway through its course, Smith River enters Smith Reservoir, which covers 170 acres (69 ha) when filled to capacity. A United States Forest Service campground near the head of the lake is accessible only by boat from a launch at the south end of the reservoir, 1.8 miles (2.9 km) away. The primitive campground, Lakes End, has 17 sites for tents. Amenities include toilets and picnic tables but no drinking water. The campground is generally open from May through September.

== Power plants ==
Smith Reservoir functions as a holding tank for water used to generate electricity at two power plants along the McKenzie River. The Carmen–Smith Hydroelectric Project, owned by the Eugene Water and Electric Board, shunts water through a tunnel from the Carmen Diversion Reservoir on the upper McKenzie to Smith Reservoir, which has a bigger holding capacity. From there, water is piped from Smith Reservoir to the Carmen Power Plant. Water from the plant discharges into the Trail Bridge Reservoir then generates more electricity at the Trail Bridge Power Plant before returning to the McKenzie below Trail Bridge Dam. The project, about 70 miles (110 km) east of Eugene, has a generating capacity of 114 megawatts (MW).

== See also ==
- List of rivers of Oregon
