= Dog River (Oregon) =

River in Oregon, United States

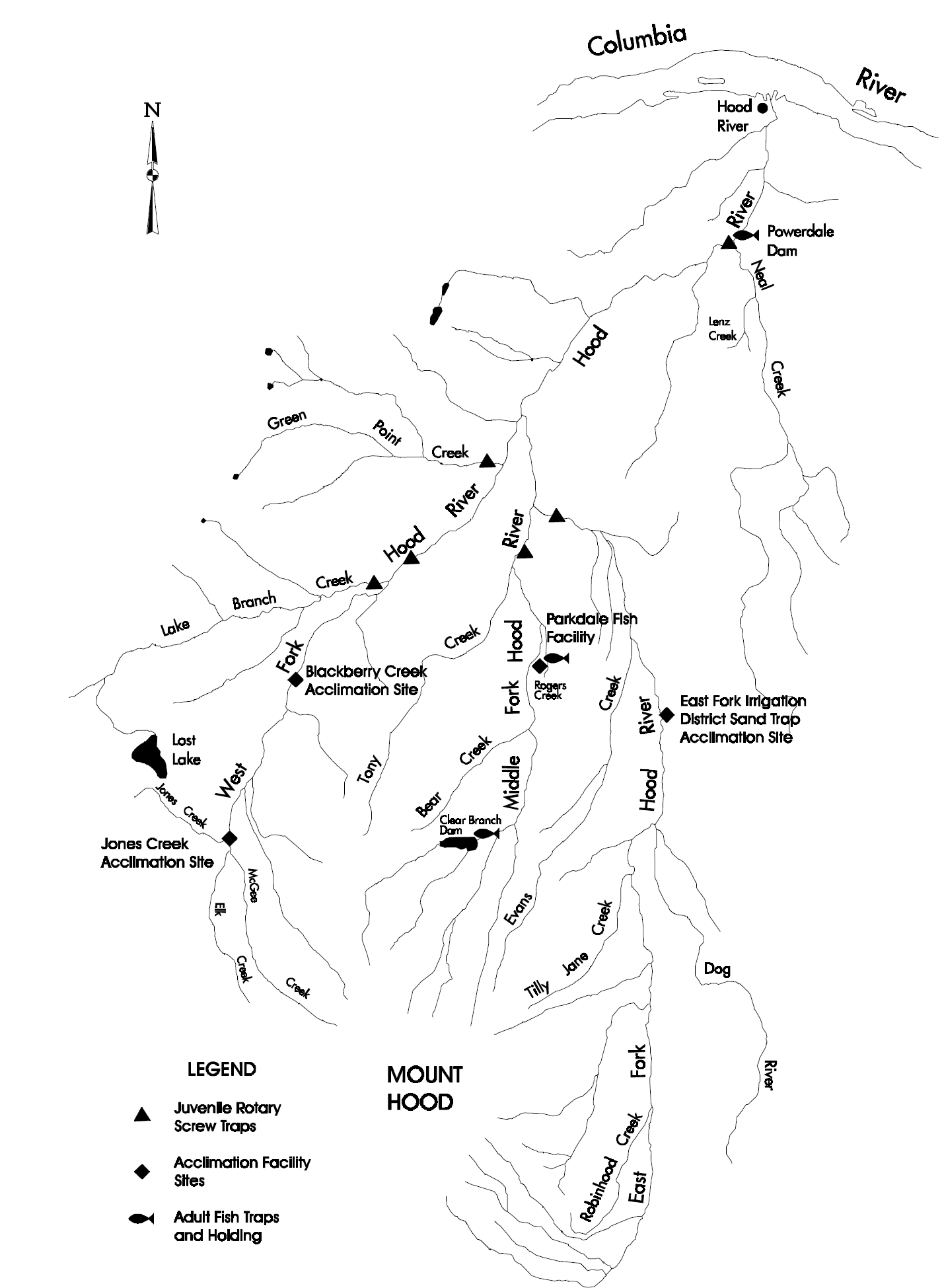
Diagram of Hood River watershed, the Dog River is at lower right

The Dog River is a small river in Oregon's Cascade Range and drains a few eastern foothills of Mount Hood. It is a tributary of East Fork Hood River and also contributes water for The Dalles and Hood River water systems. It is approximately 8 miles (14 km) long and drains the most southeastern portion of the Hood River watershed.

It arises at High Prairie Spring at 6200 ft (1890 m) elevation at the foot of Lookout Mountain (45.3473°N 121.5281°W) and flows northward. It joins with Dog River Springs at 5080 ft (1545 m) and continues surprisingly straight northward considering the mountainous terrain. It meets The Dalles city waterworks gauging station and its diversionary aqueduct intake at 4260 ft (1300 m) then turns NW to Cooks Meadow then turns directly westward. There are several half mile long zigzags north and west before turning straight northward again through steep mountainous forest. It meets the East Fork Hood River at Highway 35 where it also meets Puppy Creek at elevation 2120 (45.4662°N 121.5666°W), which is less than a mile upstream from Cat Creek.

The Dog River appears unsuitable for whitewater sports due to its low volume and restricted access for drinking water purposes.

The river's name comes from an early name for the Hood River, which was called the Dog River after a party of starving travelers resorting to eating dog meat.

== See also ==
- List of Oregon rivers
