= Clear Fork (Oregon) =

Location
- Country: United States
- Location: Clackamas County, Oregon

Physical characteristics
- Mouth
  - location: Sandy River
  - coordinates: 45°23′27″N 121°51′51″W

Clear Fork is a stream in Clackamas County, in the U.S. state of Oregon.

== See also ==
- List of rivers of Oregon
