= West Fork Salmon River (Clackamas County, Oregon) =

- Location of the mouth of the West Fork Salmon River in Oregon

Location
- Country: United States
- State: Oregon
- County: Clackamas

Physical characteristics
- Source: Mount Hood
  - location: Cascade Range
  - coordinates: 45°19′26″N 121°42′47″W
  - elevation: 5,497 ft (1,675 m)
- Mouth: Salmon River
  - location: near Red Top Meadow
  - coordinates: 45°16′50″N 121°42′47″W
  - elevation: 3,552 ft (1,083 m)

The West Fork Salmon River is a tributary of the Salmon River in Clackamas County in the U.S. state of Oregon. Beginning near Timberline Lodge at the base of Mount Hood in the Cascade Range, it flows generally south to meet the main stem Salmon near Red Top Meadow, slightly south of the intersection of U.S. Route 26 and Oregon Route 35. The entire course of the river, which has no named tributaries, lies within the Mount Hood National Forest.

Alpine Campground is about halfway between the West Fork and the main stem to the east. The highest campground in the Mount Hood National Forest, it is near Timberline Lodge and offers access to trails for hiking and mountain biking. Open from early June through early September, the campground sometimes has snow in mid-summer.

== See also ==
- List of rivers of Oregon
