= Red River (Oregon) =

- Location of the mouth of Red River in Oregon

Location
- Country: United States
- State: Oregon
- County: Lincoln

Physical characteristics
- Source: Waldport
  - coordinates: 44°25′04″N 124°04′02″W
  - elevation: 134 ft (41 m)
- Mouth: Alsea River
  - location: downtown Waldport
  - coordinates: 44°25′41″N 124°03′57″W
  - elevation: 13 ft (4.0 m)

The Red River is a stream approximately 1 mile (2 km) long in Lincoln County in the northwestern U.S. state of Oregon. It rises south of downtown Waldport and flows through the city to meet the Alsea River near the larger river's mouth on the Pacific Ocean.

== See also ==
- List of rivers of Oregon
