= Gettings Creek =

- Location of the mouth of Gettings Creek in Oregon
- Etymology: After Samuel A. Gettings, who lived along the creek in 1888

Location
- Country: United States
- State: Oregon
- County: Lane

Physical characteristics
- Source
  - location: Prune Hill
  - coordinates: 43°50′27″N 122°55′53″W
  - elevation: 2,438 ft (743 m)
- Mouth: Coast Fork Willamette River
  - location: near Cottage Grove
  - coordinates: 43°51′14″N 123°01′03″W
  - elevation: 581 ft (177 m)

Gettings Creek is a tributary of the Coast Fork Willamette River in Lane County, in the U.S. state of Oregon. Flowing generally west from near Prune Hill, it turns sharply north as it nears Interstate 5 (I-5). It enters the larger stream near Walker, between Cottage Grove to the south and Creswell to the north. The I-5 rest area called Gettings Creek lies next to the creek.

The creek and a tributary, North Fork Gettings Creek, were named for Samuel A. Gettings, an early settler. Gettings lived near the creek in 1888.

== See also ==
- List of rivers of Oregon
