= Cultus River =

Coordinates: 43.771785°N 121.803918°W

- Location within Oregon

Location
- Country: United States
- Location: Deschutes County, Oregon

Physical characteristics
- Source
  - location: Cascade range
  - elevation: 4,470'
- Mouth
  - location: Crane Prairie Reservoir
  - elevation: 4,452'
- Length: 2 miles
- Discharge
  - average: 105.5 ft 3 /s

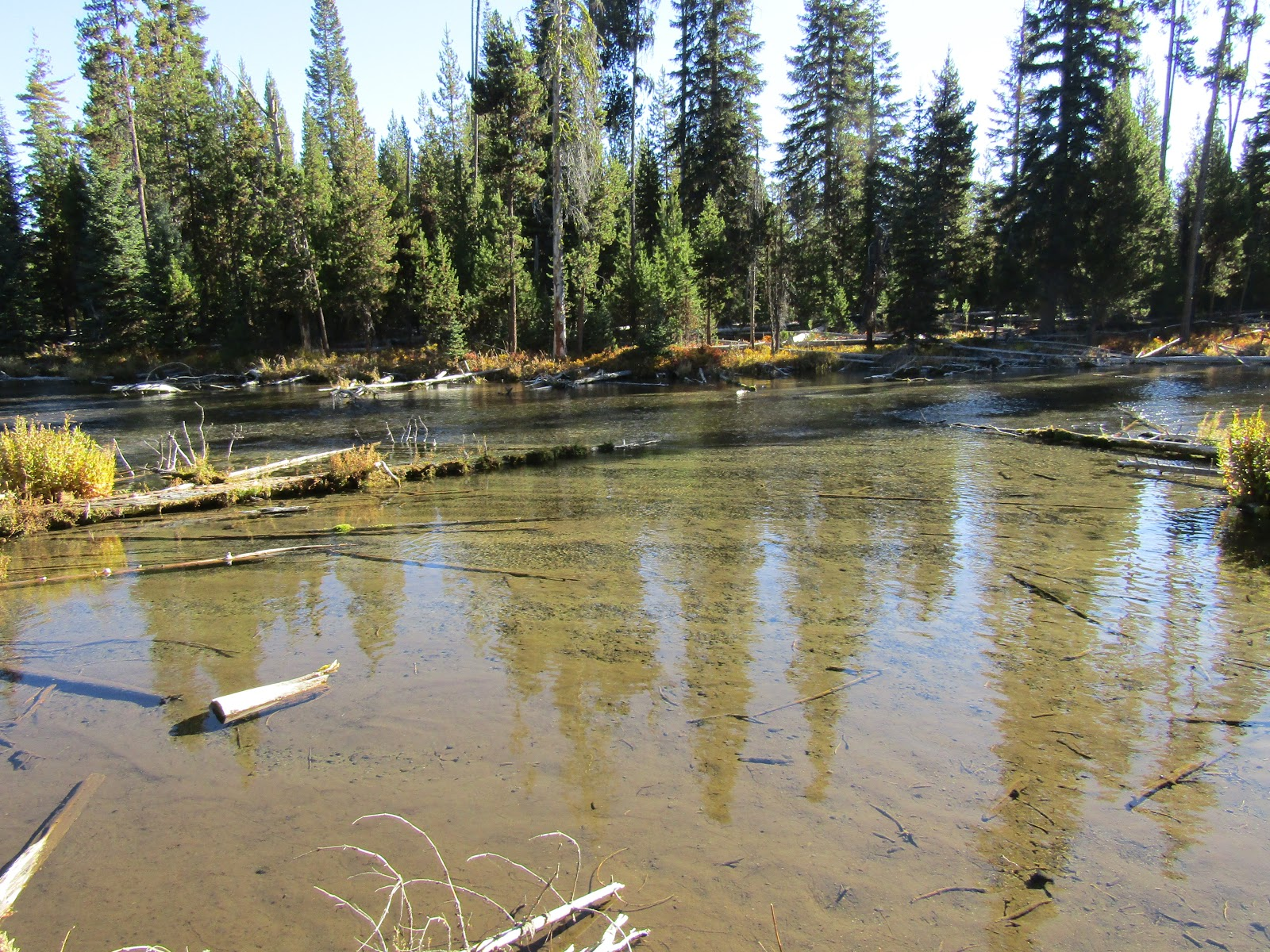
cultus river near the cultus corral horse camp

The Cultus River is a stream in the U.S. state of Oregon, located in Deschutes County, originating in the cascade mountains and flowing two miles through Deschutes National Forest into Crane Prairie Reservoir.

== See also ==
- List of rivers of Oregon
