= Dead River (Oregon) =

- Location of the mouth of the Dead River in Oregon

Location
- Country: United States
- State: Oregon
- County: Linn, Benton

Physical characteristics
- Source: Colorado Lake
  - location: east of Corvallis, Linn County
  - coordinates: 44°35′01″N 123°12′48″W
- Mouth: Willamette River
  - location: Half Moon Bend, Benton County
  - coordinates: 44°35′11″N 123°11′03″W
  - elevation: 207 ft (63 m)

The Dead River is a short tributary of the Willamette River east of Corvallis in the U.S. state of Oregon. It begins at the lower end of Colorado Lake in Linn County and flows generally east along the south side of Truax Island, which separates the Dead River from the main stem Willamette. The Dead River then turns north and enters the larger river after crossing into Benton County at Half Moon Bend northeast of Orleans.

The only named tributary of the Dead River is Owl Creek, which feeds Colorado Lake.

== See also ==
- List of rivers of Oregon
