= Limpy Creek =

- Location of the mouth of Limpy Creek in Oregon

Location
- Country: United States
- State: Oregon
- County: Douglas

Physical characteristics
- Source: Limpy Mountain
  - location: Umpqua National Forest
  - coordinates: 43°14′38″N 122°41′12″W
  - elevation: 3,300 ft (1,000 m)
- Mouth: North Umpqua River
  - coordinates: 43°18′07″N 122°40′50″W
  - elevation: 1,342 ft (409 m)

Limpy Creek is a tributary of the North Umpqua River in Douglas County, in the U.S. state of Oregon.

Limpy Creek was named for a local Native American who walked with a limp. Oregon Geographic Names says that Limpy Creek, Limpy Prairie, and other natural features in the area are all named for the same man, who lived along the Little River, another tributary of the North Umpqua River.

There is another Limpy Creek, which is a tributary of the Rogue River, in Josephine County, Oregon.

== See also ==
- List of rivers of Oregon
