= Swagger Creek =

Stream in Clackamas County, Oregon, U.S.

Coordinates: 45.22778°N 122.36801°W

Swagger Creek is a stream in Clackamas County, Oregon, in the United States. It is a tributary of Clear Creek.

== See also ==
- List of rivers of Oregon
