= Spring River (Deschutes River tributary) =

- Location of the mouth of the Spring River in Oregon

Location
- Country: United States
- State: Oregon
- County: Deschutes

Physical characteristics
- Source: spring near Anns Butte
  - location: west of Sunriver
  - coordinates: 43°51′55″N 121°29′01″W
  - elevation: 4,247 ft (1,294 m)
- Mouth: Deschutes River
  - location: near Sunriver Airport
  - coordinates: 43°52′22″N 121°27′55″W
  - elevation: 4,176 ft (1,273 m)
- Length: 1 mi (1.6 km)

The Spring River is a tributary, only about 1 mile (1.6 km) long, of the Deschutes River in Deschutes County in the U.S. state of Oregon. Arising near Anns Butte, it flows generally northeast into the Deschutes at Sunriver, about 190 miles (310 km) from the larger stream's confluence with the Columbia River. The Spring River has no named tributaries.

The creek has few resident fish but provides spawning and rearing habitat for the rainbow and brown trout and other species from the Deschutes. The lower river is accessible through United States Forest Service land.

== See also ==
- List of rivers of Oregon
