= Bieberstedt Creek =

Stream in Oregon, U.S.

Coordinates: 42°27′36″N 122°28′08″W

Bieberstedt Creek is a stream in the U.S. state of Oregon. It empties into Willow Lake.

Bieberstedt Creek has the name of one Carl Bieberstedt.
