= Steamboat Creek (Oregon) =

Steamboat Creek is the name of several creeks in the U.S. state of Oregon:

| name | type | elevation | coordinate | USGS Map | GNIS ID |
|---|---|---|---|---|---|
| Steamboat Creek (Snake River) | Stream | 1,686 ft (514 m) | 45°14′13″N 116°42′20″W | White Monument | 1150373 |
| Steamboat Creek (Umpqua River) | Stream | 1,112 ft (339 m) | 43°20′42″N 122°44′08″W | Steamboat | 1150374 |
| Steamboat Creek (Cow Creek) | Stream | 1,926 ft (587 m) | 42°49′39″N 123°06′59″W | Cedar Springs Mountain | 1154518 |
| Steamboat Creek (Bully Creek) | Stream | 3,927 ft (1,197 m) | 44°04′29″N 118°02′07″W | Hunter Mountain | 1637934 |
