= Snider Creek =

Stream in Oregon, U.S.

Coordinates: 42°26′28″N 122°56′30″W

Snider Creek is a stream in the U.S. state of Oregon. It is a tributary to Rogue River.

The name "Snider Creek" was assigned in 1937 by United States Forest Service officials.
