= Agency Creek (South Yamhill River tributary) =

River in Oregon, United States of America

Coordinates: 45.0745570°N 123.6217775°W

Location
- Location: Yamhill County, Oregon

Agency Creek is a stream in the U.S. state of Oregon, located in Yamhill County. Agency Creek is a tributary to the South Yamhill River.

== See also ==
- List of rivers of Oregon
