= Bybee Creek =

Stream in Oregon, U.S.

Coordinates: 42.955026°N 122.336146°W

Bybee Creek is a stream in the U.S. state of Oregon. It is a tributary to the Rogue River.

Bybee Creek was named after one William Bybee.
