= Lake Marie =

Lake in Oregon, United States

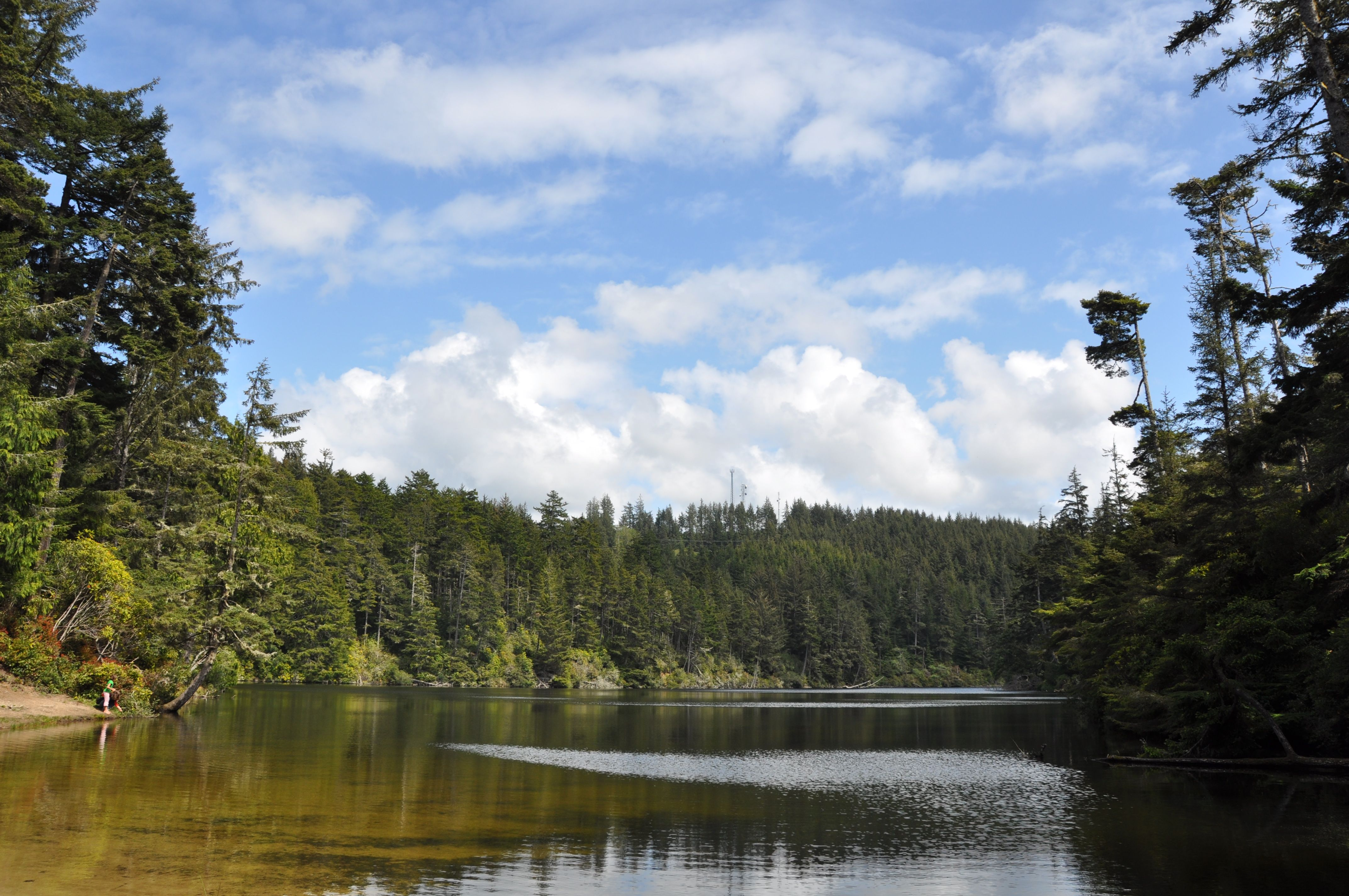

- Location within Oregon Location within the United States
- Location: Douglas County, Oregon
- Coordinates: 43.6601°N 124.1959°W
- Primary inflows: Marie Creek
- Basin countries: United States
- Surface elevation: 27 m (89 ft)

Lake Marie is a small freshwater lake in Umpqua Lighthouse State Park, near Winchester Bay, Oregon, United States. It has a sandy beach at one end for swimming and day use, hiking trails surrounding it, and is overlooked by a couple of log cabins which can be rented.
