= Gaerky Creek =

Stream in Oregon, U.S.

Coordinates: 42°12′01″N 122°41′21″W

Gaerky Creek is a stream in the U.S. state of Oregon. It is a tributary to Bear Creek.

Gaerky Creek received its name in 1854, and the stream's name possibly is a corruption of the last name of one William Gerke.
