= Tyler Creek =

Stream in Oregon, U.S.

Coordinates: 42°06′55″N 122°32′24″W

Tyler Creek is a stream in the U.S. state of Oregon. It is a tributary to Emigrant Creek.

Tyler Creek was named in the 1870s after James M. Tyler.
