= Railroad Gap Creek =

Stream in Oregon, U.S.

Coordinates: 42°44′05″N 122°56′59″W

Railroad Gap Creek is a stream in the U.S. state of Oregon. It is a tributary to Evans Creek.

Railroad Gap Creek was named in the 1870s for a mountain pass in its headwaters.
