= Kerby Creek =

Stream in Oregon, U.S.

Coordinates: 42°44′36″N 122°20′38″W

Kerby Creek is a stream in the U.S. state of Oregon. It is a tributary to Bessie Creek.

Kerby Creek was named in honor of Ed Kerby, a US Forest Service ranger.
