= Skeeters Creek =

Stream in Oregon, U.S.

Coordinates: 42°29′22″N 122°25′51″W

Skeeters Creek is a stream in the U.S. state of Oregon.

Skeeters Creek was named in the 1850s after Isaac Skeeters, a pioneer settler. A variant name is "Skeeter Creek".
