= Birdseye Creek =

Stream in Oregon, U.S.

Coordinates: 42°24′24″N 123°09′09″W

Birdseye Creek is a stream in the U.S. state of Oregon. It is a tributary to the Rogue River.

Birdseye Creek was named in 1855 for one David Birdseye.
