= Alma, Oregon =

Unincorporated community in the state of Oregon, United States

- Unincorporated community
- Location within Oregon Location within the United States
- Coordinates: 43°53′27″N 123°28′29″W
- Country: United States
- State: Oregon
- County: Lane
- Elevation: 584 ft (178 m)
- Time zone: UTC-8 (Pacific (PST))
  - Summer (DST): UTC-7 (PDT)
- Area codes: 541 & 458
- GNIS feature ID: 1116888

Alma is a former unincorporated community. It was the location of a work camp for the county Department of Corrections in Lane County, Oregon, United States until 2008. The camp was purchased by a non-profit called Veterans Legacy Oregon to create a residential facility treatment site for veterans. Alma is located on Siuslaw River Road near the Siuslaw River, 22 miles (35 km) west-southwest of Eugene.

== History ==
Alma was named in 1886 for a local woman. A post office was established at Alma in 1888, and remained in operation until it was discontinued in 1933.
