= Coast Range (EPA ecoregion) =

Coastal ecoregion in the Western United States

Coast Range ecoregion
- From Ecola State Park, Oregon, a view of coastal uplands (foreground) and volcanic mountains (background)

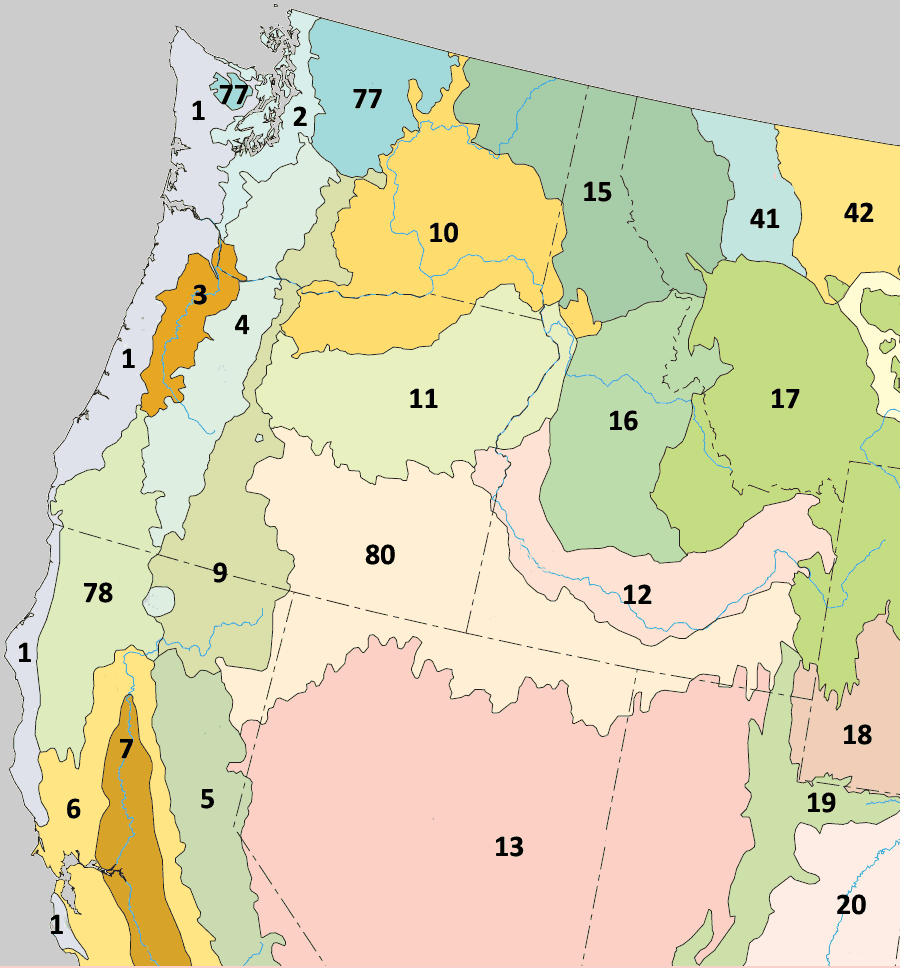
- Level III ecoregions in the Pacific Northwest, with the Coast Range ecoregion marked as (1)

Ecology
- Realm: Nearctic
- Biome: Temperate coniferous forests
- Borders: List: Puget Lowland (2); Willamette Valley (3); Southern and Central California Chaparral and Oak Woodlands (6); North Cascades (77); Klamath Mountains (78)

Geography
- Country: United States
- States: Washington; Oregon; California
- Coordinates: 43.0°N 123.8°W

The Coast Range ecoregion is a Level III ecoregion designated by the Environmental Protection Agency (EPA) in the U.S. states of Washington, Oregon, and California. It stretches along the Pacific Coast from the tip of the Olympic Peninsula in the north to the San Francisco Bay in the south, including Grays Harbor, Willapa Bay, and the Long Beach Peninsula in Washington, the entire length of the Oregon Coast, and the Northern California Coast. Named for the Coast Range mountains, it encompasses the lower elevations of the Olympic Mountains, the Oregon Coast Range, the Californian North Coast Ranges, and surrounding lowlands.

The low mountains of the ecoregion are covered by highly productive, rain-drenched evergreen forests that are home to the three tallest conifer species in the world: Coast redwood, Coast Douglas-fir, and Sitka spruce. Historically, Sitka spruce forests dominated the fog-shrouded coast, while a mosaic of western redcedar, western hemlock, and seral Douglas-fir blanketed the inland areas. Today, Douglas-fir plantations are prevalent on the intensively logged and managed landscape. Lithology influences land management strategies; slopes underlain by sedimentary rock are more susceptible to failure following clearcutting and road building than those underlain by volcanic rock.

The Coast Range ecoregion has been subdivided into fifteen Level IV ecoregions.

== Level IV ecoregions ==
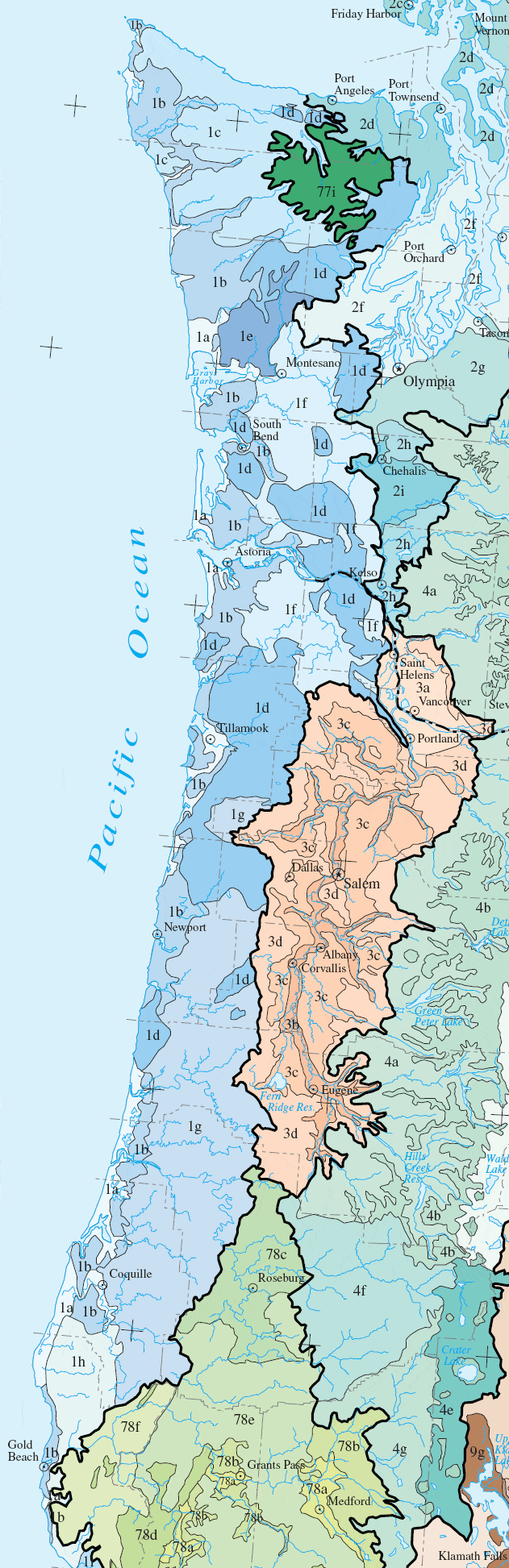
Level IV ecoregions in the Coast Range in Washington and Oregon. (Full map).

=== Coastal Lowlands (1a) ===
The Coastal Lowlands ecoregion contains beaches, sand dunes and spits, and low marine terraces below 400 feet (122 m) elevation. Characteristic features include wet forests, shallow freshwater lakes, estuarine marshes, and low-gradient, meandering tannic streams and rivers. Residential, commercial, and recreational developments are expanding in the coastal corridor. Many wetlands in the floodplains of the region's streams have been drained and converted into pastures for dairy farms, and associated stream degradation has occurred. Mature forests in the region are dominated by a canopy of Sitka spruce, western hemlock, and Douglas-fir, with salal, sword fern, vine maple, and Oregon grape in the shrub layer. The riparian zone supports red alder, western redcedar, and bigleaf maple with an understory of salmonberry; California bay-laurel is common in the south.

Estuaries and coastal wetlands may feature Baltic rush, Lyngby's sedge, tufted hairgrass, Pacific silverleaf, and seaside arrowgrass with shore pine, sweet gale, and Hooker's willow. Stabilized dunes support shore pine over salal, rhododendron, and evergreen blueberry, with dune wildrye, Chilean strawberry, and dune bentgrass. Soil textures range from silty clay loam to sandy loam.

The region covers 633 square miles (1,639 km^{2}) in Oregon and 353 square miles (914 km^{2}) in Washington, with the largest contiguous areas found near Grays Harbor, Willapa Bay, the mouth of the Columbia River, Tillamook Bay, and along the southern Oregon Coast. Public lands include the Grays Harbor, Willapa, Nestucca Bay, Siletz Bay, and Bandon Marsh National Wildlife Refuges, the Oregon Dunes National Recreation Area, and numerous state parks.

=== Coastal Uplands (1b) ===
The Coastal Uplands ecoregion includes the headlands, high marine terraces, hills, and low mountains surrounding the Coastal Lowlands, with medium to high gradient tannic streams. Elevation varies from 400 to 2500 feet (120 to 760 m). The climate is marine-influenced with an extended winter rainy season and minimal seasonal temperature extremes. Abundant fog during the summer dry season reduces vegetation moisture stress. The Uplands region roughly corresponds with the historic distribution of Sitka spruce.

After extensive logging, most of the Sitka spruce is gone, and today the forests are dominated by Douglas-fir and western hemlock, with a shrub layer of salal, sword fern, vine maple, Oregon grape, rhododendron, and evergreen blueberry. Wetter slopes and riparian areas feature red alder, bigleaf maple, and western redcedar, with a salmonberry and currant understory. The headlands are covered by grasslands. The region is nearly three times the size of the Coastal Lowlands, covering 1,431 square miles (3,706 km^{2}) in Washington and 1,117 square miles (2,893 km^{2}) in Oregon. Public lands include the Drift Creek Wilderness, the Siuslaw National Forest, and the Lewis and Clark and Cape Meares national wildlife refuges.

=== Low Olympics (1c) ===
The Low Olympics ecoregion contains foothills and lower mountains of the Olympic Range, with U-shaped valleys and high gradient streams. It rises to an elevation of approximately 4,000 feet (1,219 m). Higher areas were glaciated. Copious precipitation (up to 200 inches (5,080 mm) a year) supports a lush, epiphyte-rich rainforest of western hemlock, western red cedar, and Douglas-fir, with Pacific silver fir at higher elevations.

Riparian zones support red alder and bigleaf maple forests. Much of the region is in the third rotation of logging, including land within the Olympic National Forest. However, a portion of the region lies within Olympic National Park and contains ancient forests with extremely high biomass. The region covers 1,685 square miles (4,364 km^{2}), entirely on the Olympic Peninsula of Washington. The higher elevations of the Olympic Mountains to the east are designated as part of the North Cascades ecoregion.

=== Volcanics (1d) ===
The Volcanics ecoregion consists of steeply sloping mountains and capes underlain by fractured basaltic rocks. Elevation generally varies from 600 to 4100 feet (180 to 1250 m), although in some places the volcanic rock extends down to sea level. The region is marked by columnar and pillow basalt outcrops. Its mountains may have been offshore seamounts engulfed by continental sediments about 200 million years ago. High gradient, cascading streams and rivers occur, and the basaltic substrate preserves summer flows that are more consistent than streams on the sedimentary rocks in surrounding ecoregions. The streams still support runs of spring chinook salmon and summer steelhead. The region's Douglas-fir plantations are heavily logged. Mature forests consist of Douglas-fir, western hemlock, salal, sword fern, vine maple, Oregon grape, and rhododendron.

Wetter slopes and riparian areas may support western redcedar, bigleaf maple, red alder, salmonberry, and oxalis. Grassy coastal headlands and mountaintop balds feature Roemer's fescue, thin bentgrass, California oatgrass, and diverse forbs. This large but disjunct ecoregion covers 2,043 square miles (5,291 km^{2}) in Oregon and 1,542 square miles (3,994 km^{2}) in Washington, including parts of the Olympic and Siuslaw National Forests and the Cummins Creek and Rock Creek Wildernesses, as well as higher elevations in the Cape Meares National Wildlife Refuge.

=== Outwash (1e) ===
The Outwash ecoregion is a gently sloping fan of glacial outwash material that forms a series of undulating terraces and plateaus. Elevation varies from 20 to 1000 feet (6 to 300 m). The region lies outside the zone of marine influence, and its medium gradient streams and rivers have lower summer flow than most other parts of the Coast Range. Mature forest types include Douglas-fir, western hemlock, red alder, bigleaf maple, and western red cedar, but today the region is largely dominated by industrial timber plantations. It is the smallest of the Coast Range subregions, covering 354 square miles (917 km^{2}) in Grays Harbor County north of Aberdeen, Washington.

=== Willapa Hills (1f) ===
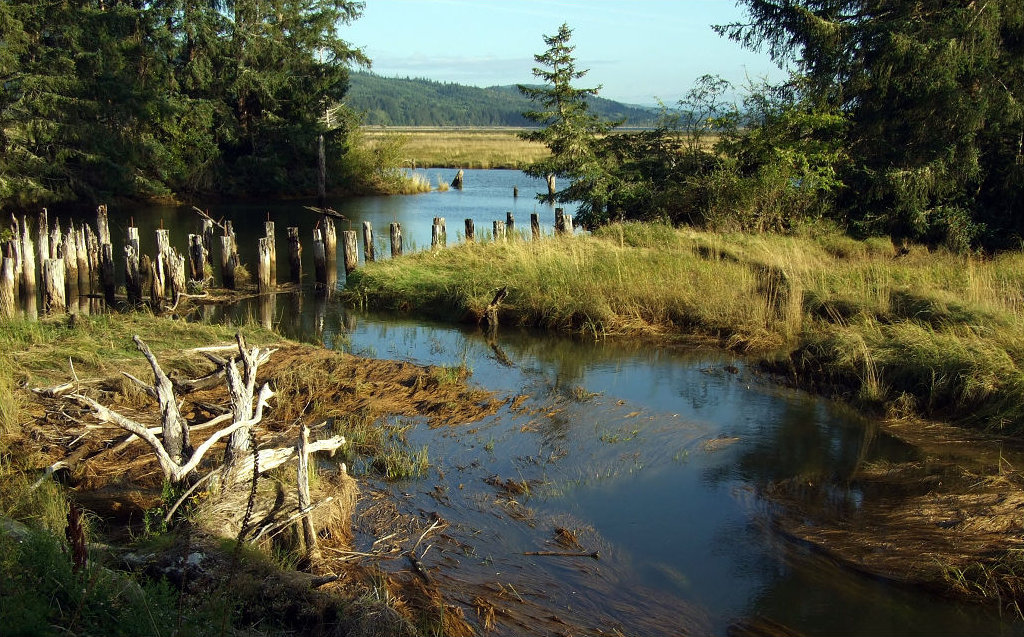
Willapa bay and hills

The Willapa Hills ecoregion (named for the Willapa Hills) consists of low, rolling hills and low, gently sloping mountains with medium gradient streams and rivers. It rises to an elevation of approximately 1,300 feet (396 m). This region has a lower drainage density than other upland areas in the Coast Range. Logging is relatively easy and less expensive in this accessible terrain, and industrial timberland has almost completely replaced the historic forests. When disturbed, the silt- and clay-textured soils are easily eroded, thereby degrading stream quality. The vegetation consists of Douglas-fir and western hemlock forests, with sword fern, vine maple, salal, Oregon grape, and rhododendron shrub layer. Wetter slopes and riparian areas support red alder, western redcedar, bigleaf maple, salmonberry, and oxalis. Large herds of Roosevelt elk winter in the region. The region covers 1,277 square miles (3,307 km^{2}) in southwestern Washington and 751 square miles (1,945 km^{2}) in northwestern Oregon, inland from the coast.

=== Mid-Coastal Sedimentary (1g) ===
The mountainous Mid-Coastal Sedimentary ecoregion lies outside of the coastal fog zone and is typically underlain by massive beds of sandstone and siltstone. Elevation varies from 300 to 3000 feet (90 to 900 m). The region is more rugged than the geologically similar Willapa Hills. Its Douglas-fir forests are intensively managed for logging, and the slopes are prone to failure when disturbed, particularly south of the Siuslaw River. Stream sedimentation is higher than in the Volcanics ecoregion. The mature forest consists of Douglas-fir and western hemlock, with salal, sword fern, vine maple, Oregon grape, and rhododendron; tanoak may be found on drier slopes to the south. Wetter slopes and riparian areas support bigleaf maple, western redcedar, grand fir, red alder, salmonberry, and oxalis, with California bay-laurel in the south. This is the largest of the Coast Range subregions, covering 3,739 square miles (9,684 km^{2}) in the Central and Southern Oregon Coast Range.

=== Southern Oregon Coastal Mountains (1h) ===
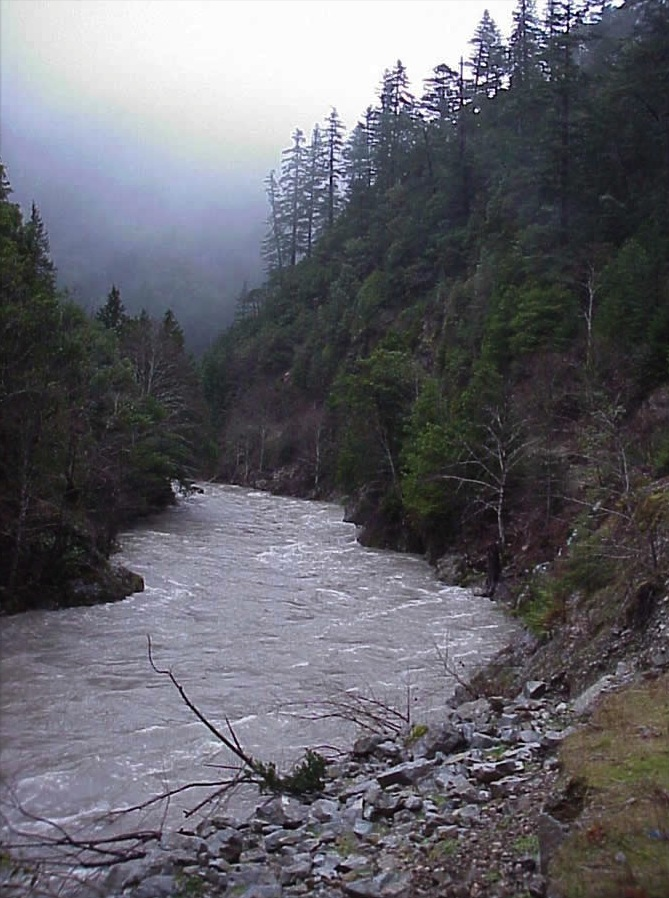
Elk River

The Southern Oregon Coastal Mountains ecoregion is a geologically and botanically diverse ecoregion that is a transition zone between the Coast Range and the Siskiyou Mountains, which form part of the Klamath Mountains ecoregion to the east. Rising to an elevation of approximately 4,000 feet (1,219 m), this region has the climate of the Coast Range but the varied lithology of the higher, more dissected Siskiyou Mountains, underlain by Jurassic sandstone, metamorphosed sediments, granite, and serpentinite. Distributions of northern and southern vegetation blend together here and species diversity is high. Douglas-fir, western hemlock, tanoak, Port Orford cedar, and western redcedar are present, along with salal, sword fern, vine maple, Oregon grape, rhododendron, California bay-laurel, bigleaf maple, grand fir, red alder, salmonberry, and oxalis. The region covers 692 square miles (1,792 km^{2}) in a remote area of Curry County in southwestern Oregon containing the Sixes and Elk River drainages. It includes Grassy Knob Wilderness within the Siskiyou National Forest.

=== Northern Franciscan Redwood Forest (1i) ===
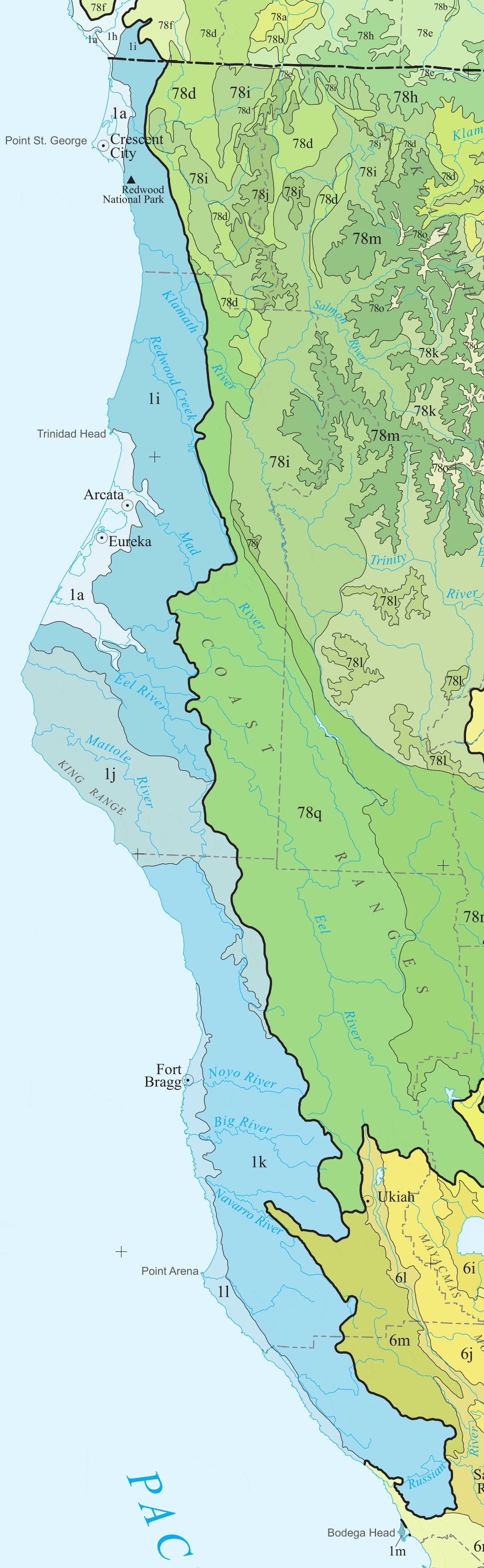
Map of Coast Range ecoregion in California

The low mountains of the Northern Franciscan Redwood Forest ecoregion lie entirely in the coastal fog zone and are characteristically covered by fog-dependent coast redwood and Douglas-fir. Historically, unbroken redwood forests occurred and moderated local climate by trapping coastal fog and producing shade. The combination of shade, root competition, young soils with a deep organic debris layer on the soil surface, occasional fire, and silting by floods limits the number of plant species. The region extends north only about 10 miles (16 km) into Oregon near Brookings. In some factors, this region has more similarities to the temperate rain forests of the Oregon and Washington Coast Ranges than to redwood forest regions to the south. Dominated by conifers, the region also includes western hemlock, western redcedar, Port Orford cedar, grand fir, and some Sitka spruce near the coast. Hardwoods such as red alder and tanoak occur. Fine and fine-loamy, isomesic, Ultisols and Alfisols are typical soils.

=== King Range / Mattole Basin (1j) ===
In contrast to the redwood forests to the north and south, the vegetation of the King Range/Mattole Basin ecoregion includes a mixed evergreen forest of Douglas-fir, tanoak, and madrone, as well as areas of grassland. Prairies and coastal scrub cover many of the headlands. Although this is one of the wettest spots in California, the King Range rises above the coastal fog. In summer, warm, dry, offshore winds also help keep the fog away, making the King Range too dry to support the redwood forests that surround it on three sides.

The King Range thrusts 4,000 feet (1,200 m) above the Pacific, making this area one of the more spectacular and remote stretches of coastline in the continental United States. In the northern part of the region, the Bear and Mattole Rivers drain a hilly-to-steep landscape of mixed evergreen forest, with a land cover that includes a relatively greater amount of annual grasslands than in Ecoregions 1i to the north or 1k to the south. Timber production, livestock grazing, and recreation are primary land uses.

=== Coastal Franciscan Redwood Forest (1k) ===
The main part of the Coastal Franciscan Redwood Forest ecoregion extends through Mendocino County from just south of the King Range to just south of the Russian River in Sonoma County. Unlike the conifer-dominated forests of Ecoregion 1i to the north, these central redwood forests typically are more a mixture of conifers and hardwoods. Vegetation includes a multi-story canopy of redwood, Douglas-fir, tanoak, bigleaf maple, evergreen shrubs, and various grasses. In the southern parts of the region, there are more coast live oaks and grassland savannas that are intermixed with denser areas of forest. The near-coastal part of the region that is influenced more by fog has more redwoods and similarities to Ecoregion 1i to the north. Soil temperature regimes are mostly isomesic and mesic. Soil moisture regimes are predominantly udic, ustic, and xeric. Runoff is rapid and many of the smaller streams are dry by the end of the summer. Natural lakes are absent.

=== Fort Bragg / Fort Ross Terraces (1l) ===
The Fort Bragg/Fort Ross Terraces ecoregion forms an elevated coastal plain that has less relief (200–800 feet or 61–244 metres) than the adjacent mountains of Ecoregion 1k. Quaternary and Tertiary sandstones and mudstones form the terraces, and some areas are deeply dissected, forming ravines that expose Cretaceous sedimentary rocks. Elevations range from sea level to about 1,300 feet (400 m). Soil moisture regimes are udic and some aquic, and soil temperatures are isomesic. Monthly and annual temperature variations are minimal and summer fog is common. Vegetation includes coastal grasslands and shrubs, stunted beach pine, Bishop pine, or pygmy cypress, along with areas of some grand fir and western hemlock. Terrace soils typically are unsuitable for redwoods, although they do occur in ravines and on some bluffs.

=== Point Reyes / Farallon Islands (1m) ===
The Point Reyes/Farallon Islands ecoregion includes the Point Reyes Peninsula, Bodega Head and the sand spit at the north end of Bodega Bay, and the offshore Farallon Islands. The maritime climate is temperate and humid, with frequent fog. There are granitic rocks along with Pliocene and Miocene sandstone and mudstone, and Quaternary sands. Soil temperature regimes are mostly isomesic, with some mesic. Soil moisture regimes are mostly ustic. Common vegetation includes Douglas-fir, tanoak, Bishop pine, coast live oak, Pacific reedgrass, and coyote brush. A few redwoods occur. Most of the streams are small, and dry by the end of the summer. The Farallon Islands, about 20 miles southwest of Point Reyes, are a group of small granitic islands providing important habitat for seabirds, seals, and sea lions.

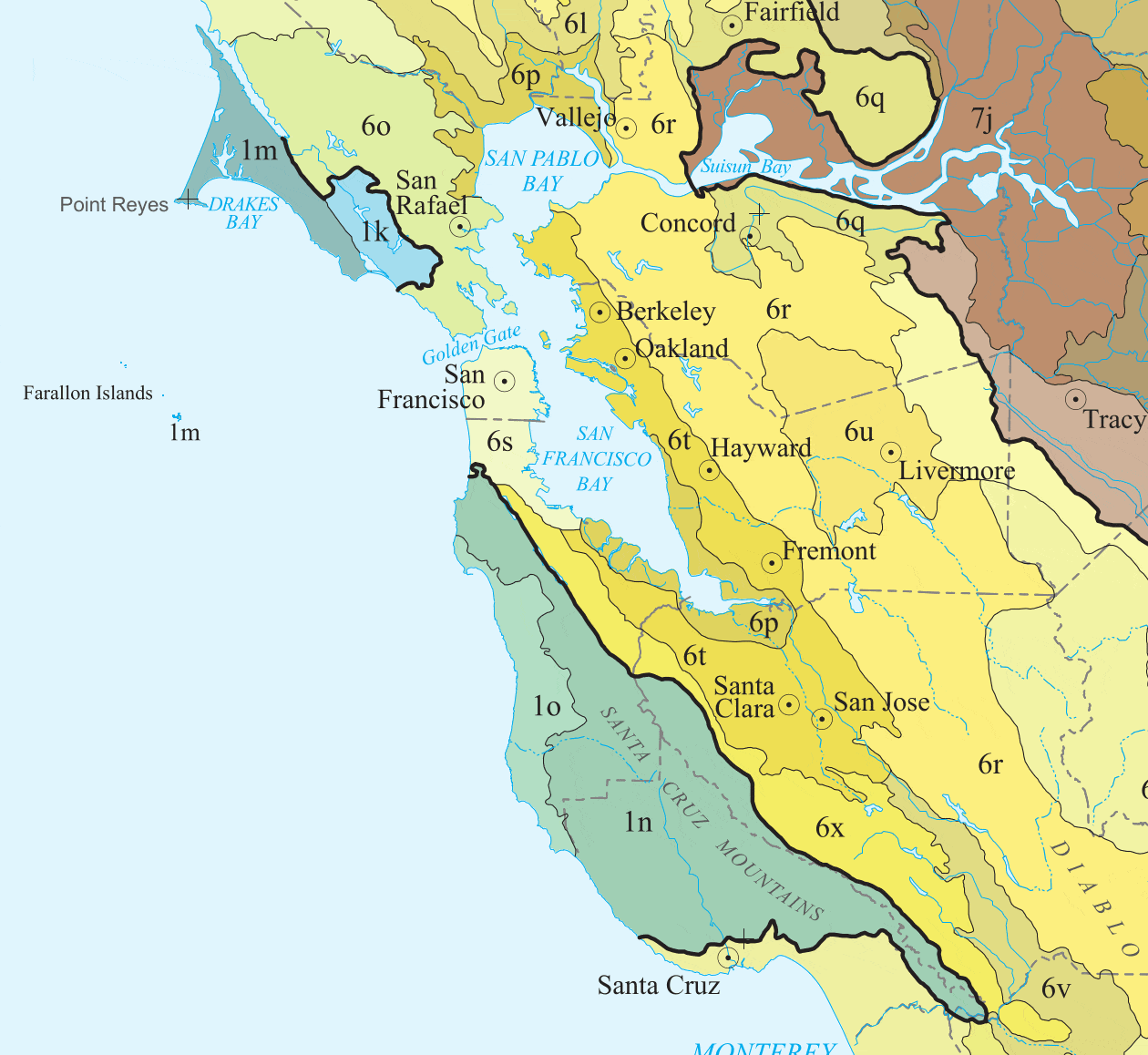
Ecoregions of the San Francisco Bay Area, including sub-regions of the Coast Range

A small outlier of the region occurs in the south in Marin County that includes the coniferous and hardwood forests of Mount Tamalpais and Bolinas Ridge. This small area of redwoods and other forest types ranges in elevation from sea level to more than 2,500 feet (760 m). It has more relief and coniferous forest than the Marin Hills ecoregion (6o). Various types of coniferous and hardwood forests occur, composed mostly of Douglas-fir, redwoods, tanoak, madrone, California bay, and coast live oak. Mount Tamalpais and Bolinas Ridge force moisture out of the air as it cools and ascends the steep western mountain faces. These western parts are heavily forested with redwoods and Douglas-fir. A few areas of drier exposures or shallow soils contain grasslands, coastal scrub, or chaparral.

=== Santa Cruz Mountains (1n) ===
The Santa Cruz Mountains ecoregion covers the western and southwestern parts of the range where vegetation includes redwood, Douglas-fir, tanoak, coast live oak, and California bay, along with some chaparral and coastal scrub species. The shrub layer under forest canopy generally is sparse. Species of limited range in this area include the Santa Cruz cypress and Shreve oak. Forests of this region are ecologically and genetically distinct from those of the redwood ecoregions (1i, 1k) farther north. Clear-cut logging was typical from the late 1800s to about the 1960s. Most logging now uses smaller selective cuts. Climate varies from the west to the east, as the high mountain ridges reduce the penetration of maritime air. Winters are cool and wet. On the western side, summers are cool, and fog or low overcast is typical. Soil temperature regimes are mostly mesic and isomesic, with some thermic. Soil moisture regimes are mostly ustic and xeric. Streams on the northeastern side of the mountains generally are dry during the summer, but streams on the seaward side generally are perennial.

=== San Mateo Coastal Hills (1o) ===
The San Mateo Coastal Hills ecoregion has lower relief and elevations than Ecoregion 1n, with more coastal scrub vegetation and a few small areas of cropland rather than the denser forest and woodland of the Santa Cruz Mountains ecoregion (1n). Marine terraces, coastal benches, and small valleys are the primary landforms. Elevations range from sea level to about 1,000 feet (300 m). Pliocene sandstone and siltstone are the main rock types compared to the mix of geology in Ecoregion 1n that includes older sedimentary and some igneous rocks. Mollisol soil type is typical, with mostly thermic to isomesic temperature regimes. Soil moisture regimes are mostly xeric and ustic. Summer fog is common and winters are cool and moist.

== Gallery ==
=== Flora ===
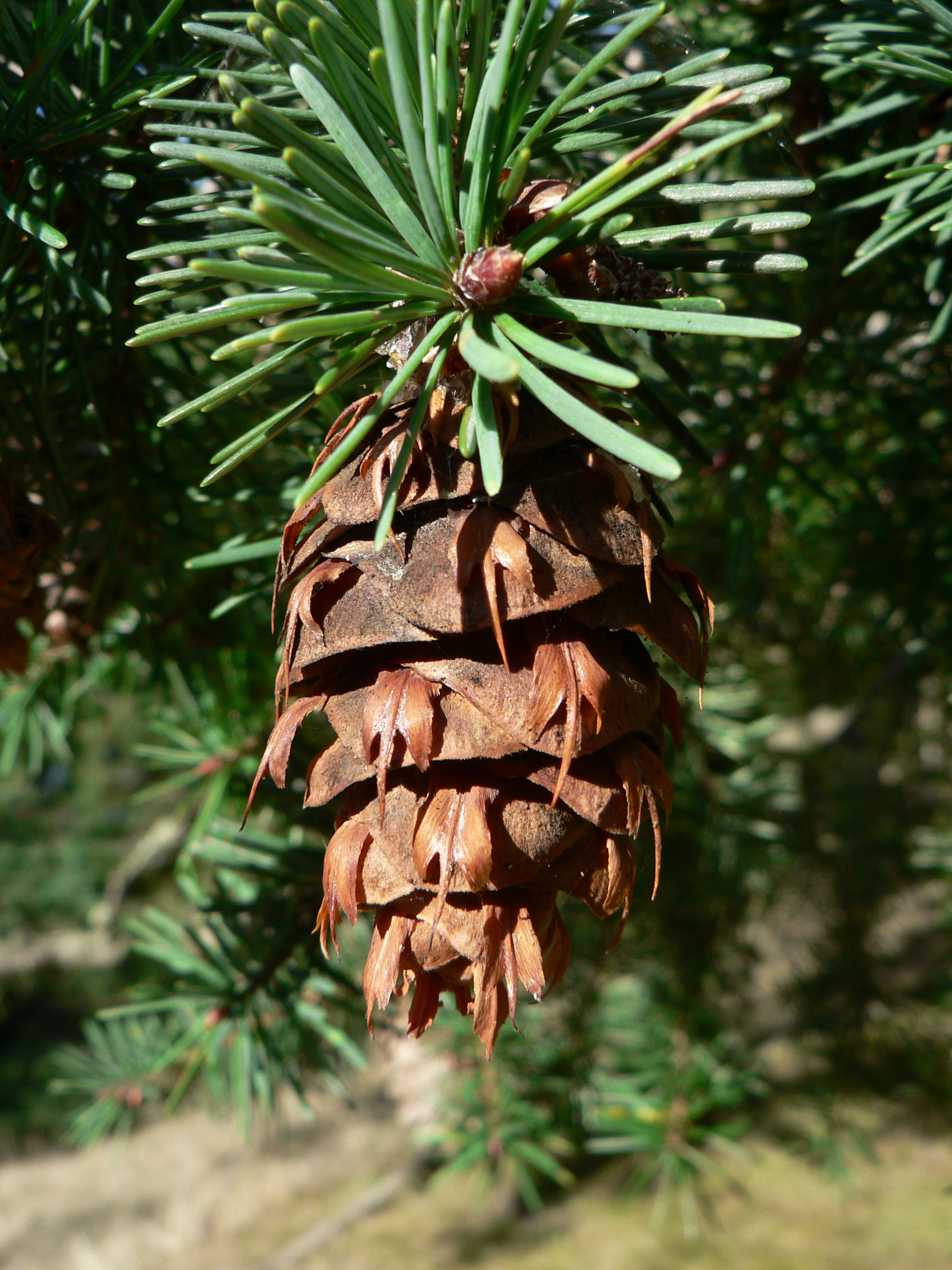
Coast Douglas-fir, Oregon's state tree

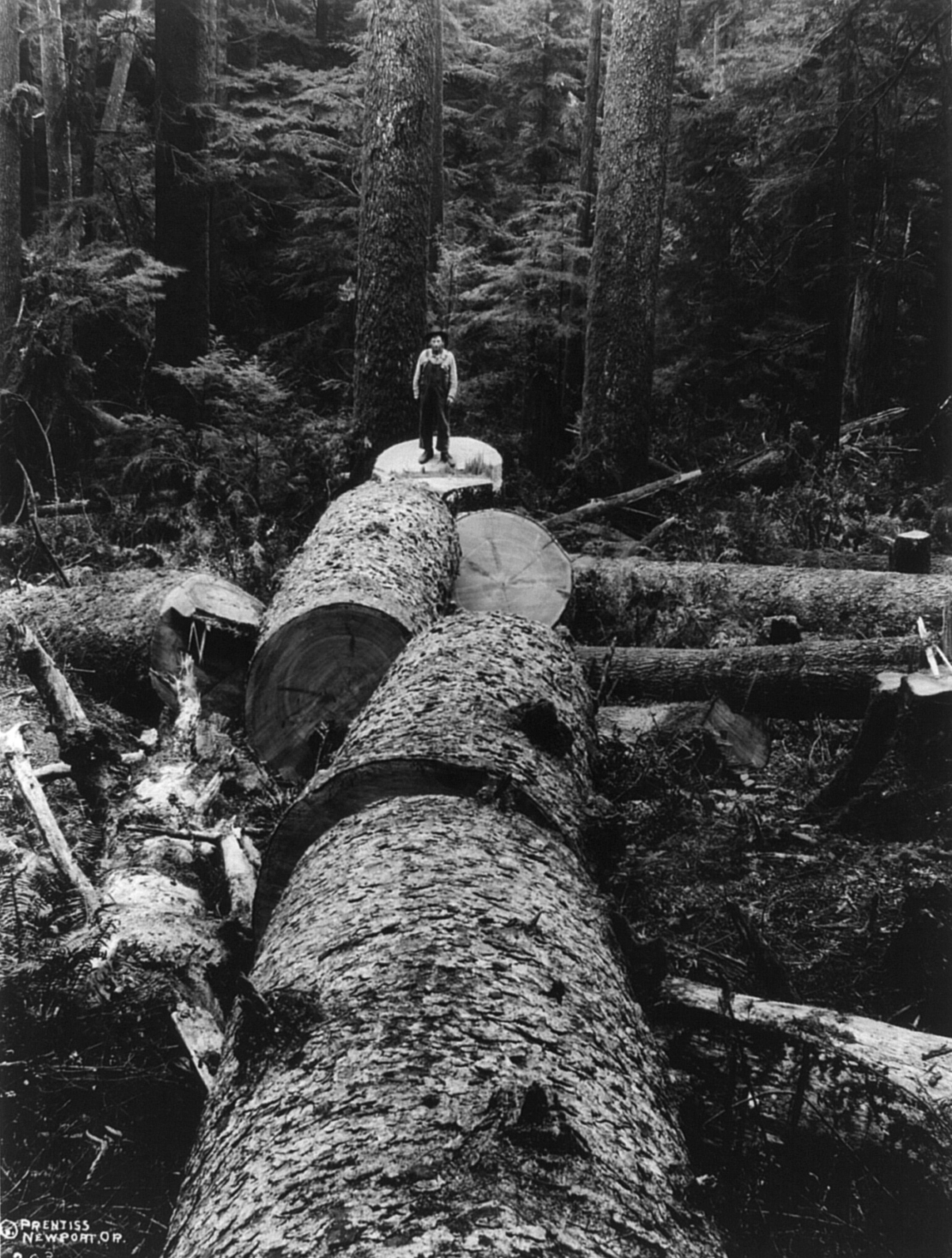
Sitka spruce logged in the Oregon Coast Range

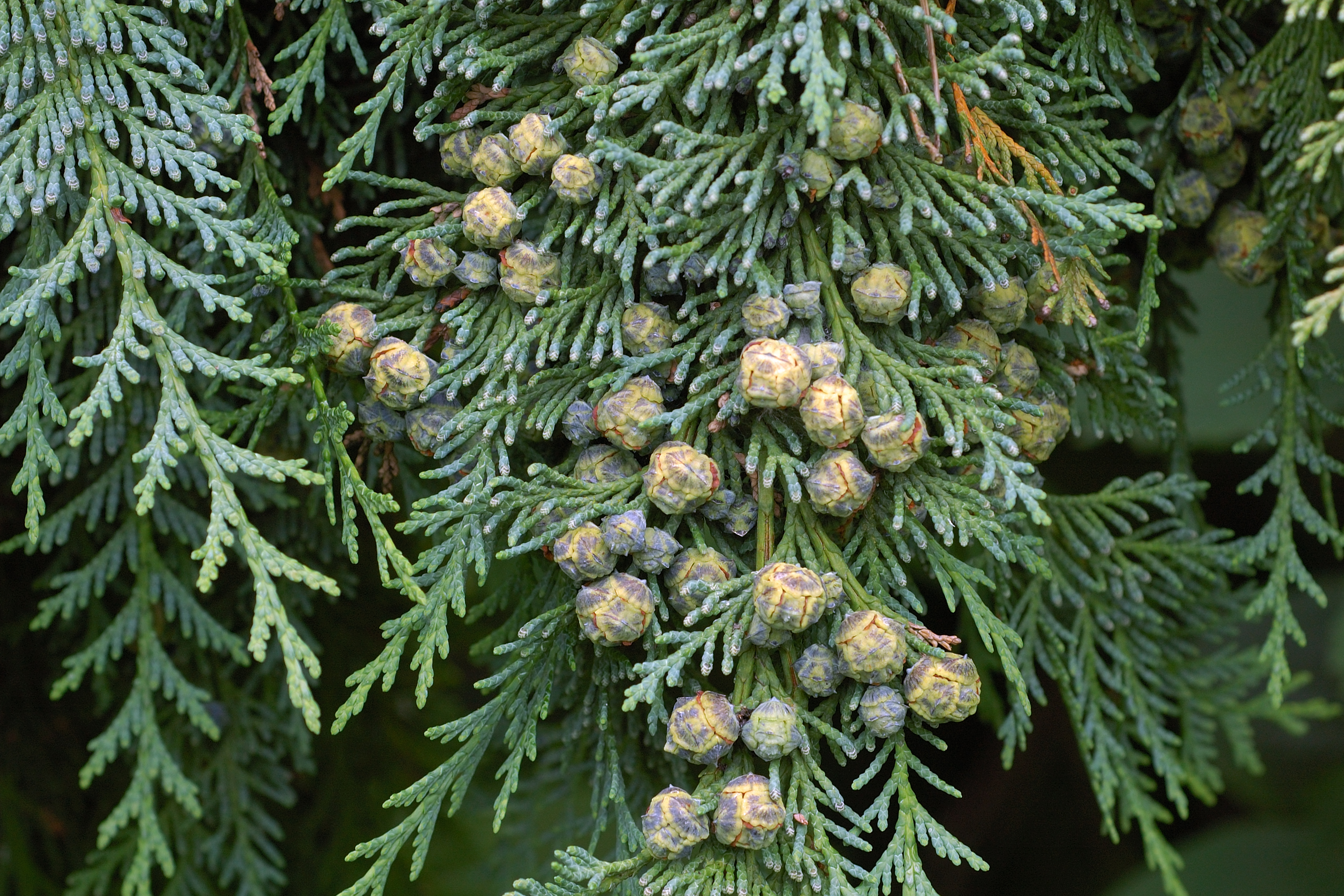
Port Orford cedar, endemic to the Southern Oregon Coastal Mountains

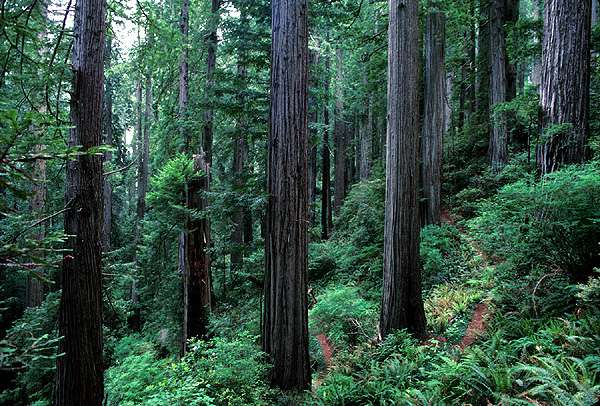
Coast redwood trees in Northern California

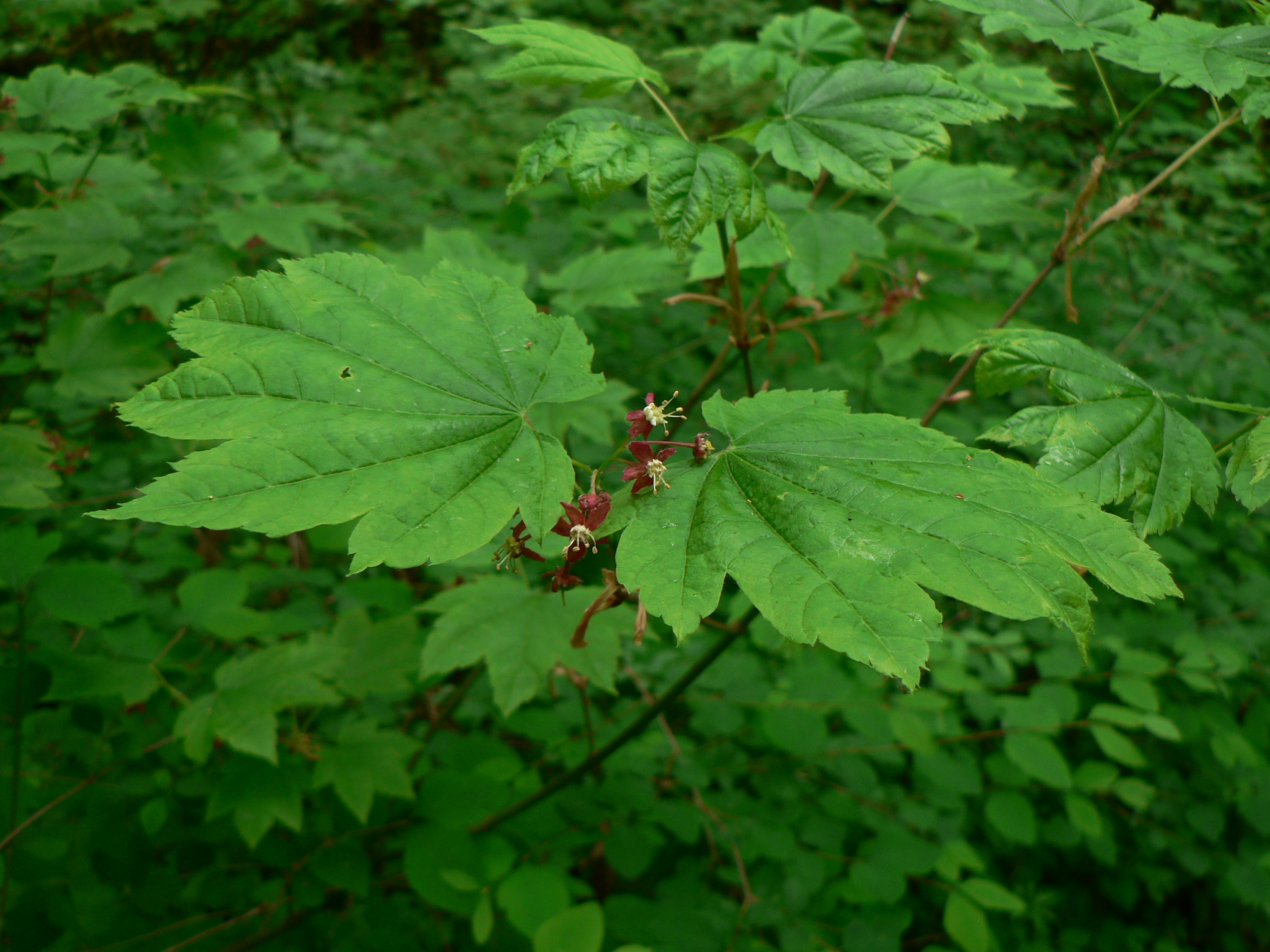
Vine maple

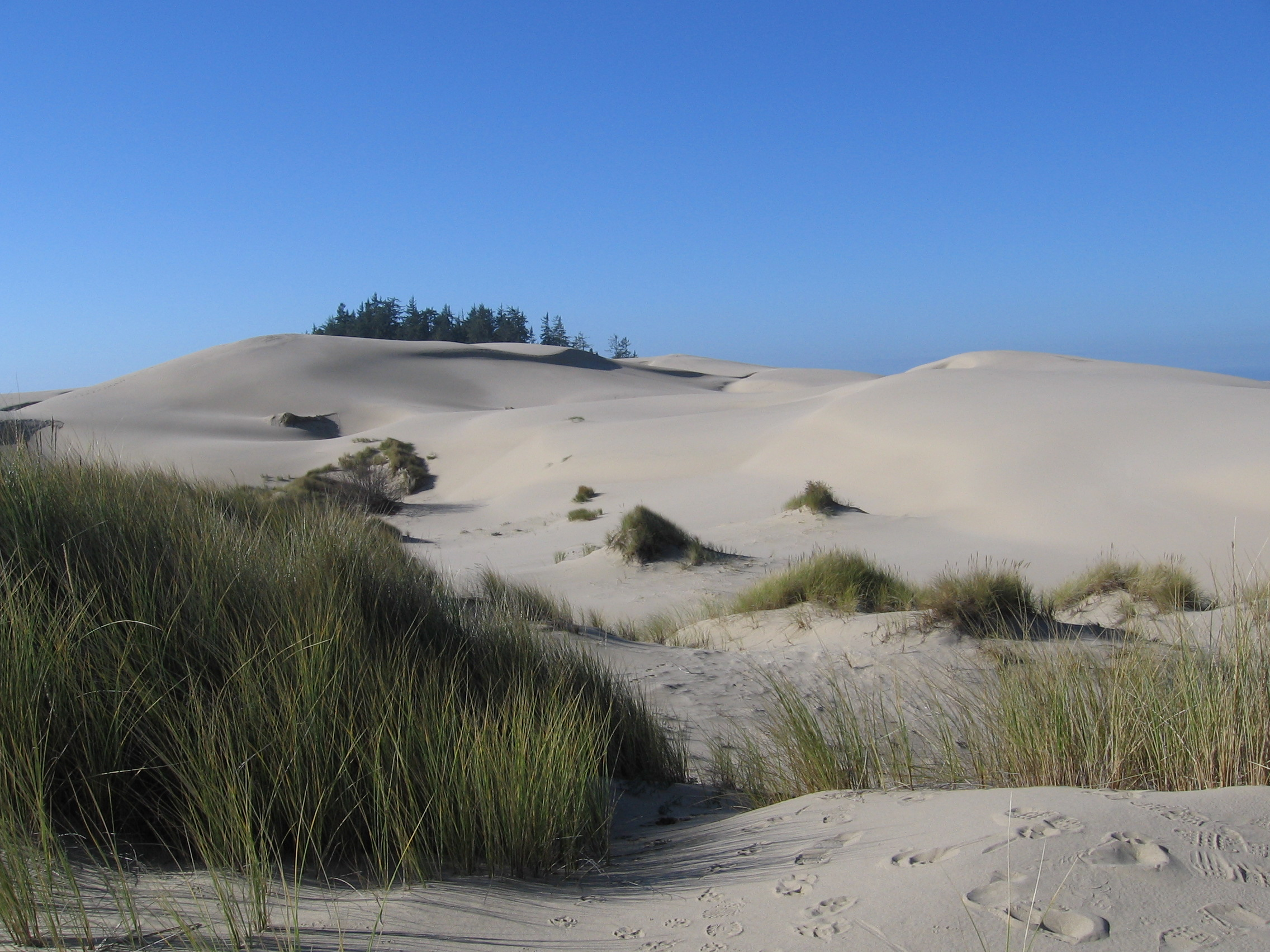
Grasses help stabilize the Oregon Dunes.

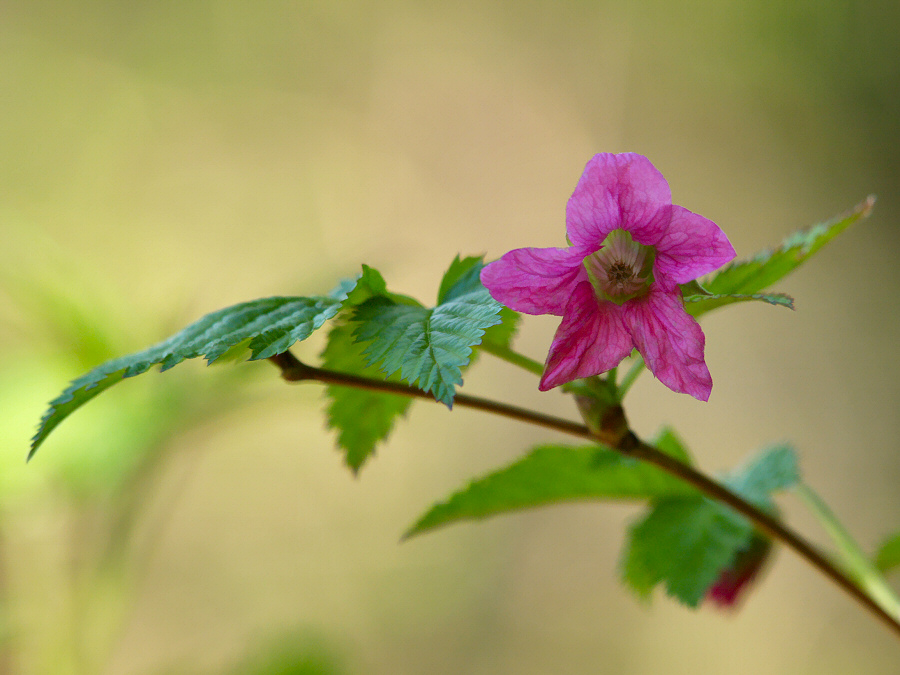
Salmonberry blossom

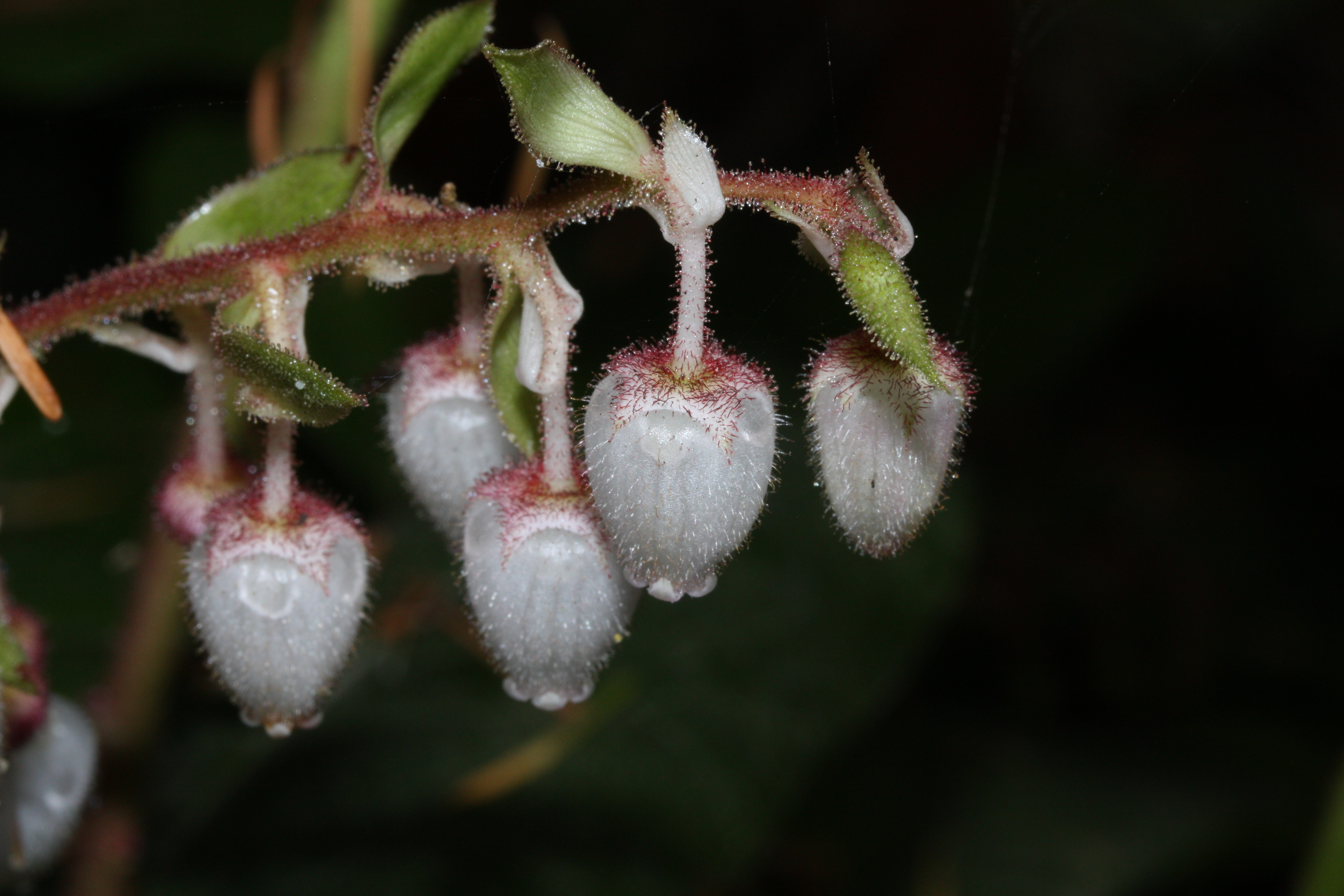
Salal flowers

=== Fauna ===
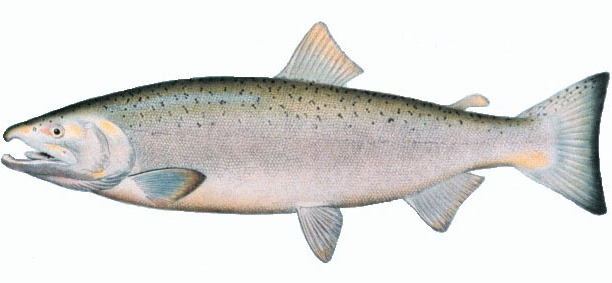
Coho salmon

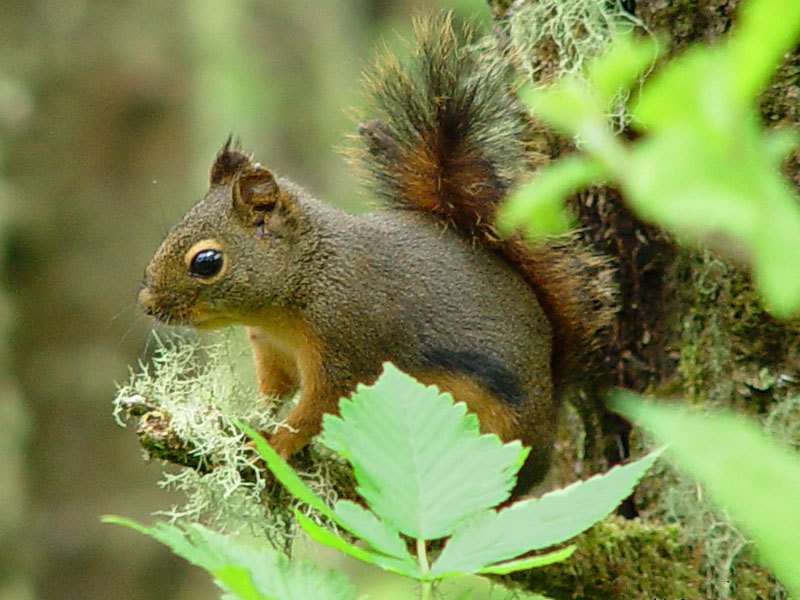
Douglas squirrel near the Oregon Coast

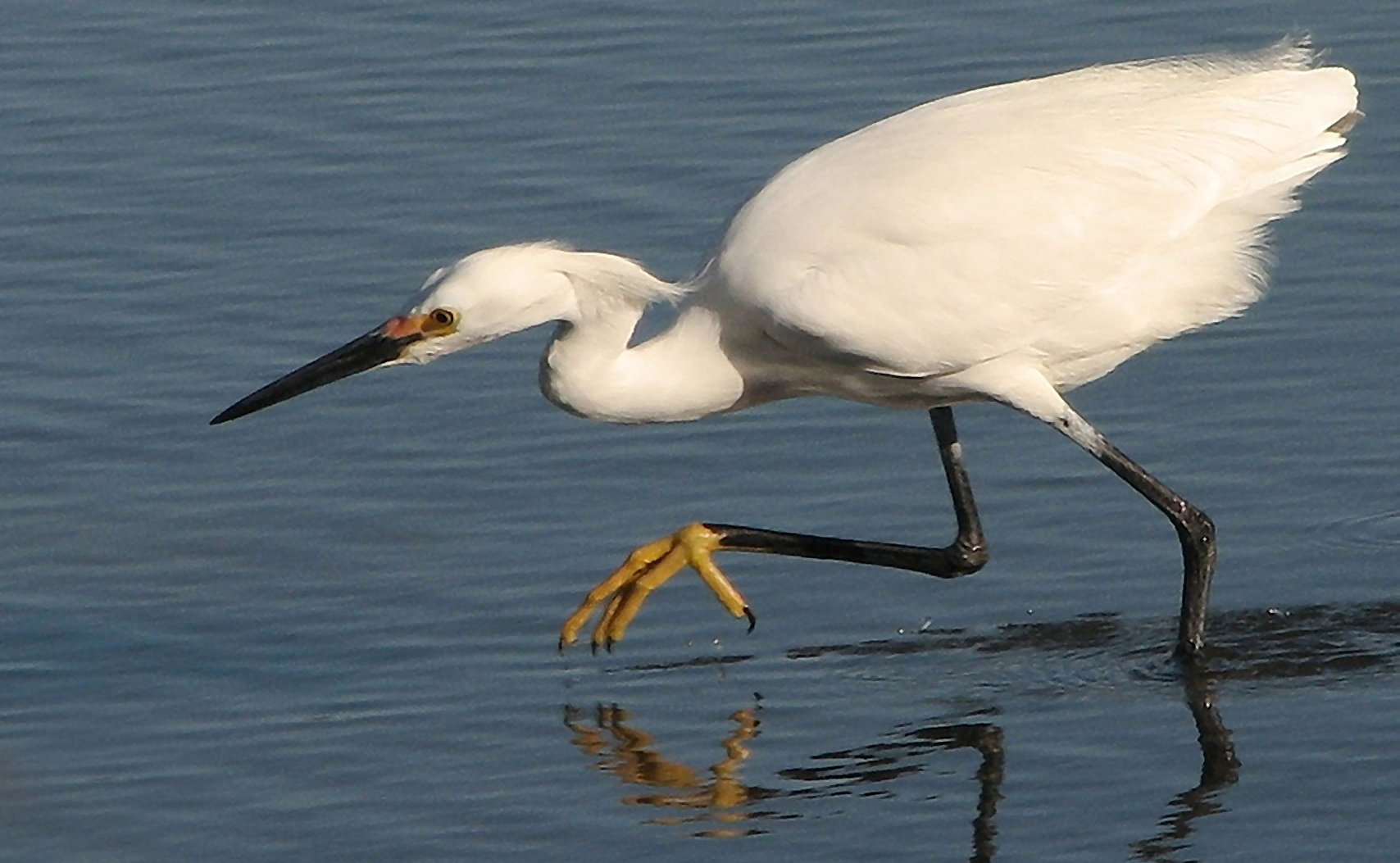
Snowy egret hunting fish

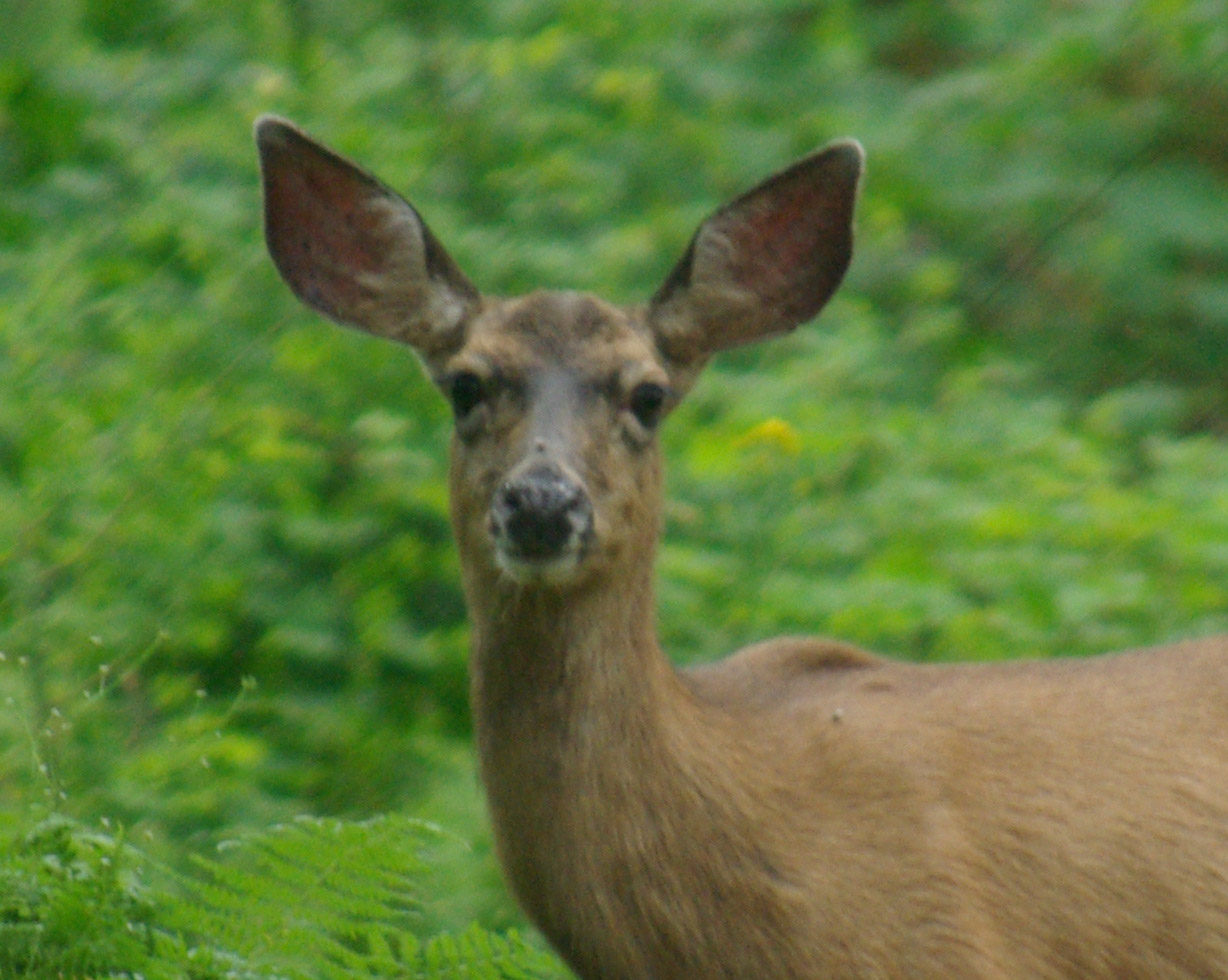
Black-tailed deer in the Northern Oregon Coast Range

=== Landscapes ===
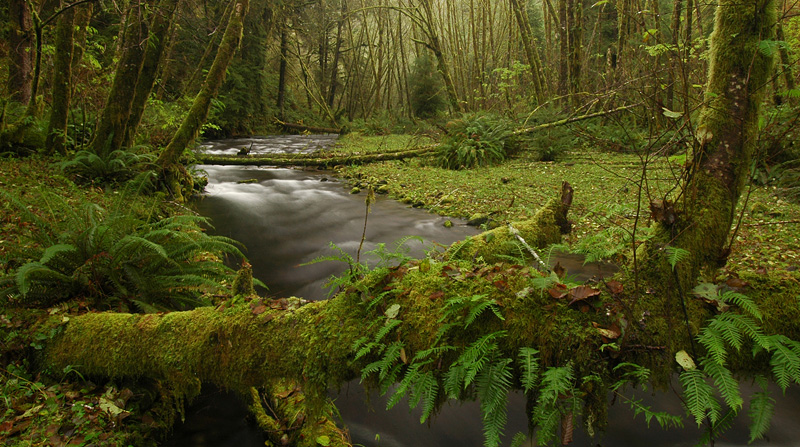
Rock Creek Wilderness supports salmon, steelhead, and cutthroat trout.

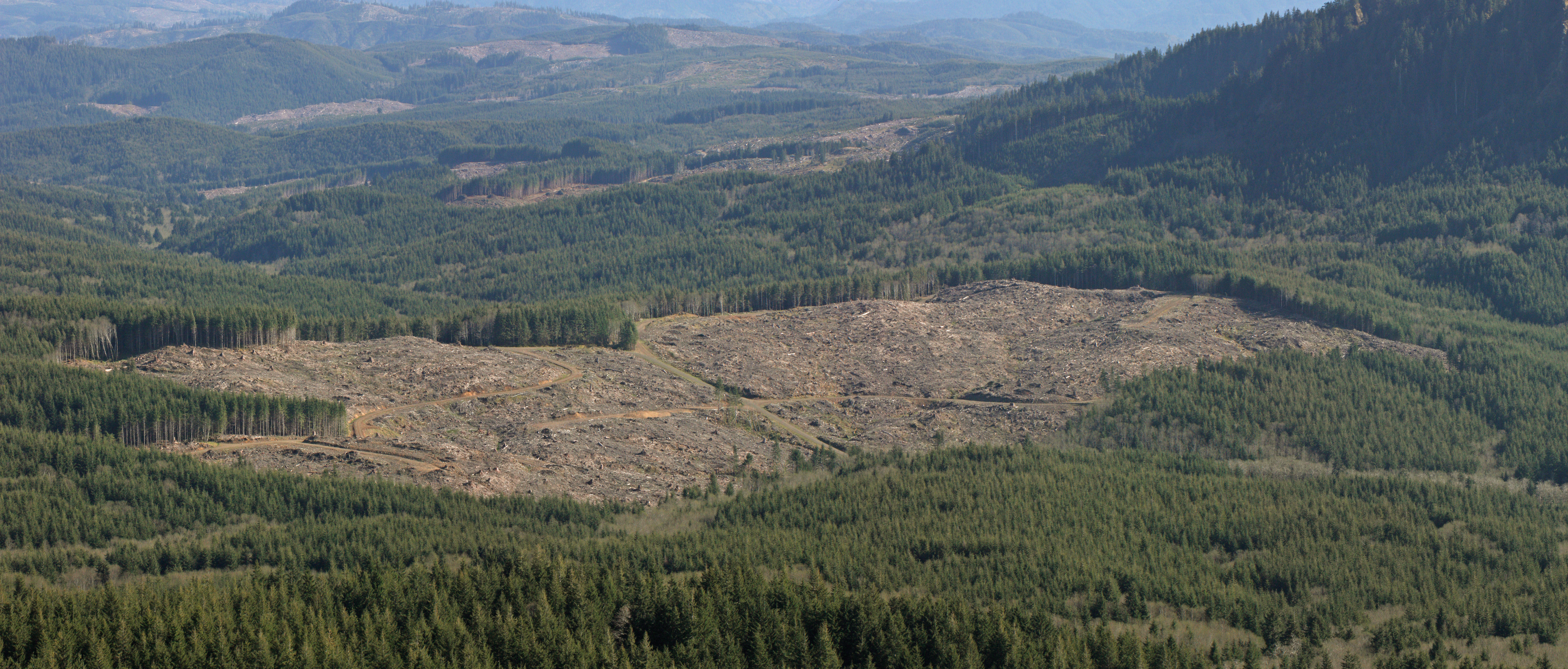
Clearcutting and road building, as in this area near the source of the Lewis and Clark River, may contribute to slope failure and affect surface water quality.

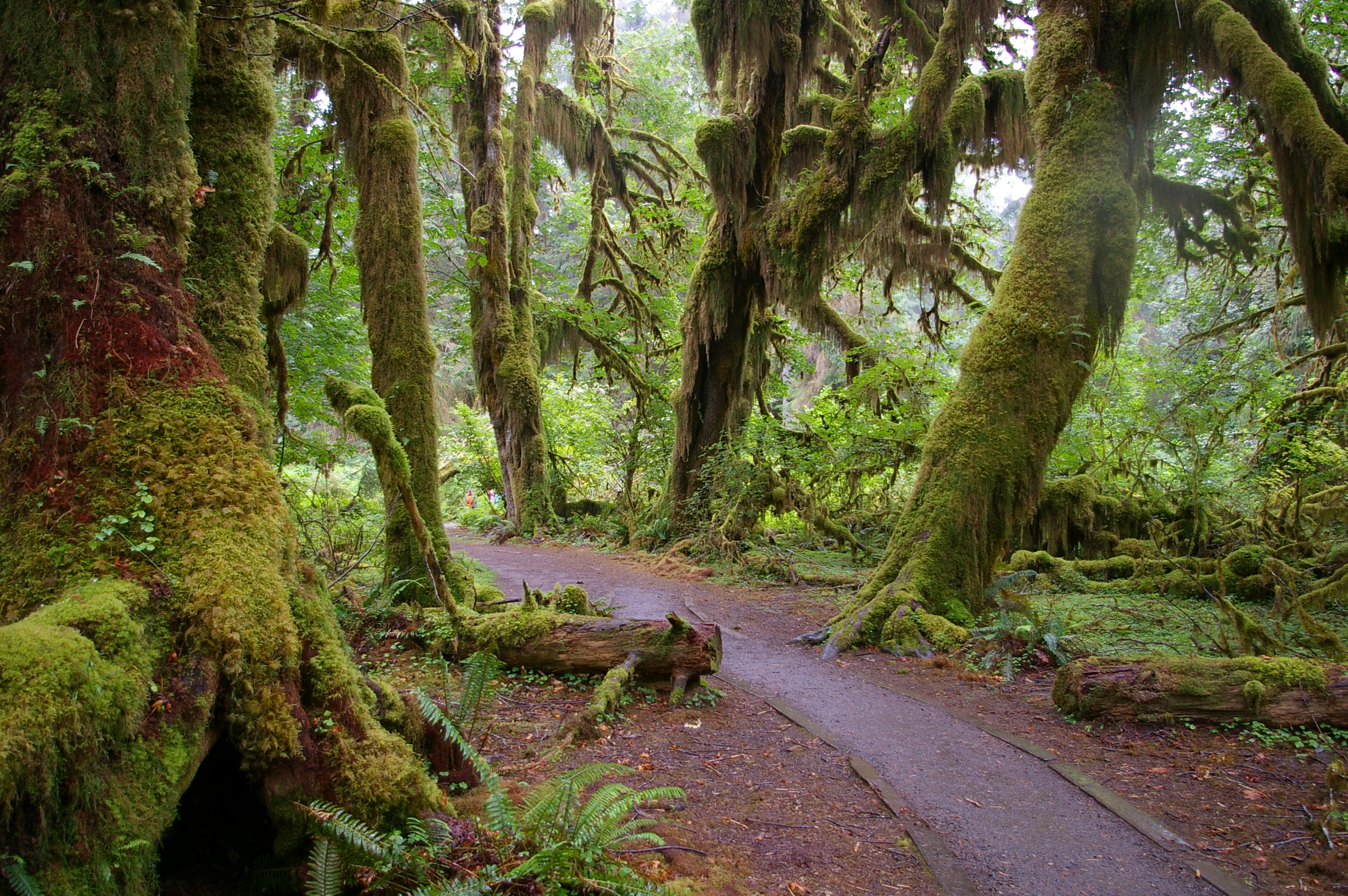
Olympic rainforests have the highest living biomass density on earth.

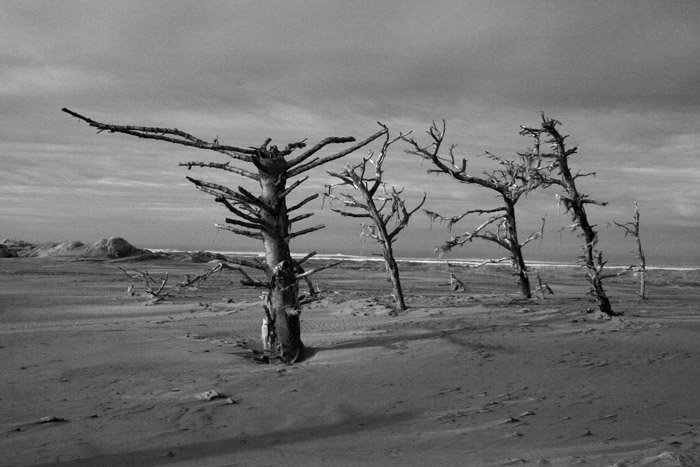
The dynamic Lanphere Dunes in Humboldt County exemplify the coastal dune forest ecosystem.

== See also ==
- Coast Range (disambiguation)
- Ecoregions defined by the EPA and the Commission for Environmental Cooperation:
  - List of ecoregions in North America (CEC)
  - List of ecoregions in the United States (EPA)
  - List of ecoregions in Oregon
- The conservation group World Wildlife Fund maintains an alternate classification system:
  - List of ecoregions (WWF)
  - List of ecoregions in the United States (WWF)
