= Mollisol =

Nutrient-rich soil type

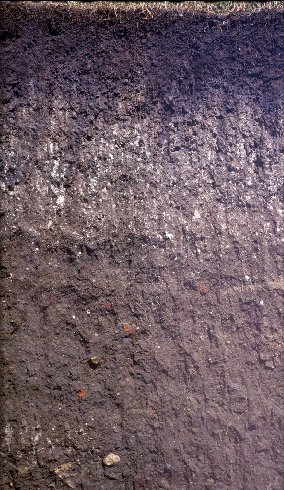
- A Mollisol profile
- Used in: USDA soil taxonomy
- Parent material: Loess, Limestone
- Climate: Humid continental, semi-arid

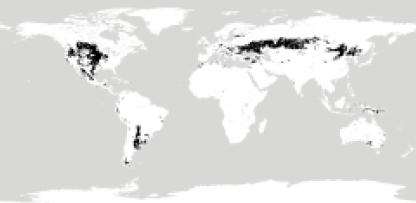
Mollisols of the world

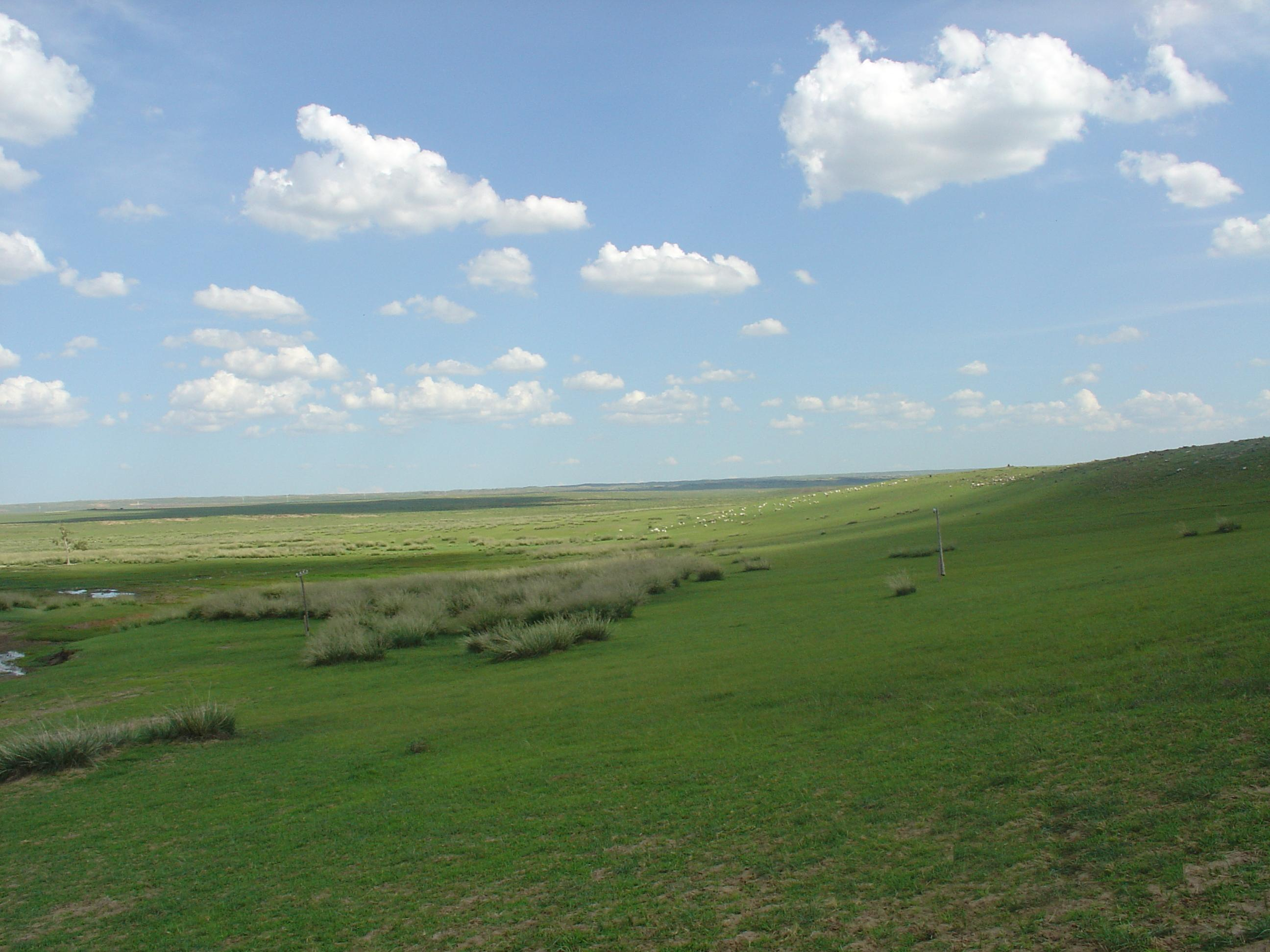
Mollisols are generally associated with the steppe biome

Mollisol is a soil type which has deep, high organic matter, nutrient-enriched surface soil (a horizon), typically between 60 and 80 cm (24–31 in) in depth. This fertile surface horizon, called a mollic epipedon, is the defining diagnostic feature of Mollisols. Mollic epipedons are created by long-term addition of organic materials derived from plant roots and typically have soft, granular soil structure.

Mollisols typically occur in savannahs and mountain valleys (such as Central Asia, and the North American Great Plains). These environments have historically been strongly influenced by fire and abundant pedoturbation from organisms such as ants and earthworms. It was estimated that in 2003, only 14 to 26 percent of grassland ecosystems remained in a relatively natural state (that is, they were not used for agriculture due to the fertility of the horizon). Globally, they represent ~7% of ice-free land area. As the world's agriculturally most productive soil order, the Mollisols represent one of the most economically important soil orders.

Though most other soil orders known today were formed at the beginning of the Carboniferous Ice Age 280 million years ago, Mollisols are best known from the paleopedological record possibly as early as the Maastrichtian, though confidently found in the Eocene. Their development is very closely associated with cooling and drying of the global climate that occurred during the Oligocene, Miocene and Pliocene.

== Suborders ==
Albolls—wet soils; aquic soil moisture regime with an eluvial horizon
Aquolls—wet soils; aquic soil moisture regime
Cryolls—cold climate; frigid or cryic soil temperature regime
Gelolls—very cold climate; mean annual soil temperature < 0 °C
Rendolls—lime parent material
Udolls—humid climate; udic moisture regime
Ustolls—subhumid climate; ustic moisture regime
Xerolls—Mediterranean climate; xeric moisture regime

Soils which are mostly similar to Mollisols but contain either continuous or discontinuous permafrost, consequently affected by cryoturbation are common in high mountain plateaus of Tibet and the Andean altiplano. Such soils are called Molliturbels or Mollorthels and provide the best grazing land in such cold climates because they are not acidic like many other soils of very cold climates.

Other soils which have a mollic epipedon are classified as Vertisols because high shrink swell characteristics and relatively high clay contents dominate over the mollic epipedon. These soils are especially common in parts of South America in the Paraná River basin receiving abundant but erratic rainfall and extensive deposition of clay-rich minerals from the Andes. Mollic epipedons also occur in some Andisols but the andic properties take precedence.

In the World Reference Base for Soil Resources (WRB), Mollisols are split up into Chernozems, Kastanozems and Phaeozems. Shallow or gravelly Mollisols may belong to the Leptosols. Many Aquolls are Gleysols, Stagnosols or Planosols. Mollisols with a natric horizon belong to the Solonetz.

== See also ==
- Pedogenesis
- Pedology (soil study)
- Soil classification
- Soil science
- Soil type
