= Annual grasslands =

Grassland ecosystem dominated by annual grasses and forbs

Annual grasslands are a type of grassland ecosystem characterized by the dominance of annual grasses and forbs. They are most commonly found in regions with Mediterranean climates, such as California, and provide important habitats for a variety of wildlife species.

Annual grasslands have a history of disturbance factors, including grazing, crop production, fire, and drought, which have contributed to the conversion of native perennial grasslands to non-native annual-dominated grasslands. Management issues in annual grasslands include carbon sequestration, native grass restoration, invasive species control, and land use change.

== Characteristics ==
Annual grasslands are dominated by non-native annual grasses and forbs, with a few native perennial grass species present. These grasslands are subject to seasonal and yearly variations in species composition and productivity, which are largely controlled by the timing and amount of precipitation and temperature.

=== Vegetation dynamics ===
Long-term changes in annual grassland productivity, species composition, and ecosystem processes are influenced by continuing waves of invasion, changes in soil moisture depletion patterns, and fire frequency. Species composition in annual grasslands can change throughout a growing season depending on germination, seedling establishment, and plant growth progress.

=== Disturbance factors ===
Grazing, crop production, fire, and drought have all contributed to the conversion of native grassland to non-native annual-dominated grassland. Severe droughts such as those in 1828, 1862, and 1864, have also played a role in this conversion. Some researchers suggest that high-frequency burning by native peoples and Europeans may have made the native grasslands susceptible to invasion by non-native species.

== Management issues ==
Management issues in annual grasslands include carbon sequestration, native grass restoration, invasive species control, and land use change.

=== Carbon sequestration ===
In the absence of reliable and cost-effective restoration techniques for re-establishing deep-rooted native perennial grasses and forbs, the potential for enhancing carbon storage in annual grassland ecosystems remains limited. The only exception occurs in locations where successful tree planting can be carried out.

=== Native grass restoration ===
The restoration of native perennial grasses, like needlegrass, has proven difficult due to the intense competition from prevailing annual grasses and forbs. Particularly on steep, rocky, and eroded sites, the rate of restoration failures surpasses successes.

=== Invasive species ===
Invasive species such as medusahead, barbed goatgrass, and yellow starthistle, are particularly troublesome in annual grasslands. These species can outcompete native grasses and forbs, and their management is an ongoing challenge.

=== Land use change ===
Since 1973, conversion to residential, industrial, and agricultural uses has led to significant losses in annual grasslands. This has resulted in increased urban-rural conflicts, habitat fragmentation, and loss of habitat for various species.

== Water quality ==
Water quality is a concern in annual grasslands and oak-woodlands, particularly in California, where the majority of reservoirs are located within or near these ecosystems. Sediment, nutrients, pathogens, and heat are among the possible water pollutants linked to grazing in annual grassland watersheds. In 2004, the California State Water Resources Control Board implemented policies to regulate non-point source pollution, impacting landowners and agricultural producers, such as range livestock operations.

== Practices and uses ==
Annual grasslands have primarily been used for livestock production since European settlement. More than 80% of the annual grasslands are in private ownership, and most are grazed. Orchards, wine grapes, and irrigated pastures have also displaced some annual grasslands in certain areas.

=== Grazing management practices ===
Annual grasslands are suitable for grazing by various livestock types throughout the year. Grazing systems such as continuous grazing and seasonal-suitability grazing are commonly used. Proper stocking rates are crucial to avoid overgrazing and ensure long-term sustainability.

=== Forage sources and seasonal use ===
Forage sources in annual grasslands are seasonal in their availability, productivity, and quality. The grasslands provide green feed in late fall, winter, and spring, and low-quality dry feed during the rest of the year. Many ranches supplement livestock diets with additional feed when green forage is scarce.

=== Animal nutrition and forage quality ===
Balancing the nutrient requirements of livestock with the nutrients provided by range forage is a significant challenge for a substantial part of the year. The quality of range forage is influenced by factors such as plant species, season, geographical location, and range improvement techniques.

=== Poisonous plants ===
Several poisonous plants are present in annual grasslands, although livestock losses are rare. Common toxic plants in the region include yellow starthistle, fiddleneck, milkweeds, and larkspur. Livestock poisoning often occurs when hungry animals are concentrated on toxic plants.

=== Brush and weed control ===
Effective management of harmful weeds in annual grasslands necessitates a comprehensive, multi-year strategy that encompasses both prevention and control of existing infestations. Various techniques, such as controlled burning, herbicide application, mechanical methods, and selective grazing, can be employed. However, the implementation of prescribed fires has decreased in recent years due to concerns regarding liability and regulatory policies.

=== Seeding and fertilization ===
Enhancing forage production and quality can be accomplished by sowing annual legumes, including rose clover and subterranean clover, as well as annual grasses like ryegrass. In specific rainfall zones, the application of nitrogen, sulfur, and phosphorus fertilizers may also contribute to increased production.

== See also ==
Grassland

Mediterranean climate

Rangeland management
