= Cordillera de la Costa =

Cordillera de la Costa (Spanish coast range) may refer to the following mountain ranges:

- Chilean Coast Range
- Venezuelan Coastal Range

== See also ==
- Coast Range (disambiguation)
