= Medusahead =

Medusahead is the common name of more than one species of plant, including:

- Euphorbia caput-medusae, a euphorb
- Cirsium caput-medusae, a thistle
- Taeniatherum caput-medusae, a grass
