= Coast Range =

Coast Range, Coastal Range or Coast Mountains may refer to:

- Pacific Coast Ranges of North America
  - California Coast Ranges
  - Coast Mountains, often referred to as the Coast Range, a major mountain range in British Columbia, Alaska and Yukon
  - Olympic Mountains in Washington
  - Oregon Coast Range
  - Willapa Hills in Washington, an extension of the Oregon Coast Range
- Coast Range (EPA ecoregion), an ecoregion comprising portions of the California Coast Ranges, Oregon Coast Range and the Olympic Mountains in Washington
- Chilean Coast Range
- Hai'an Range in Taiwan
- Venezuelan Coastal Range
- Syrian Coastal Mountain Range
