= Semi-arid climate =

Climate with precipitation below potential evapotranspiration

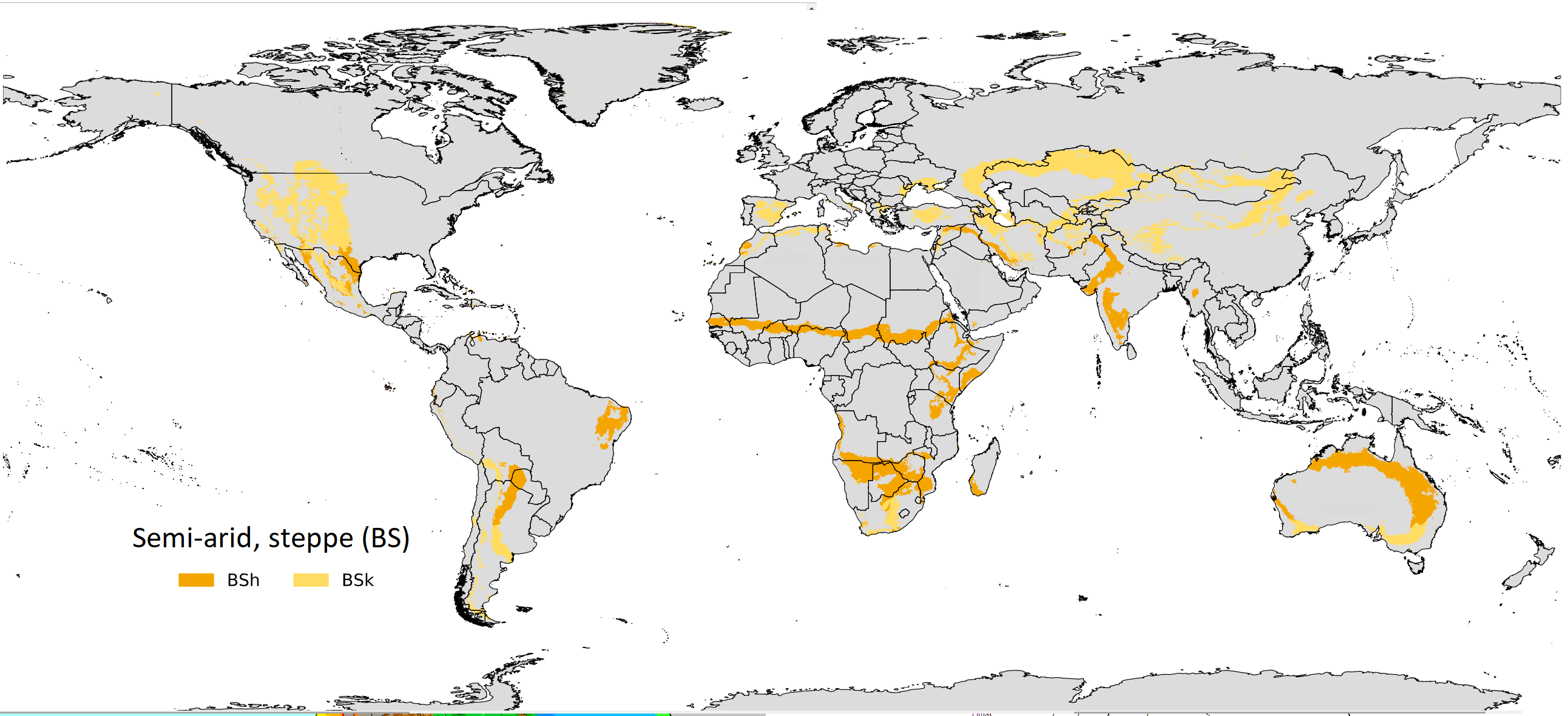
Regions with semi-arid climates BSh BSk

A semi-arid climate, semi-desert climate, or steppe climate is a dry climate sub-type. It is located on regions that receive precipitation below potential evapotranspiration, but not as low as a desert climate. There are different kinds of semi-arid climates, depending on variables such as temperature, and they give rise to different biomes.

== Defining attributes of semi-arid climates ==
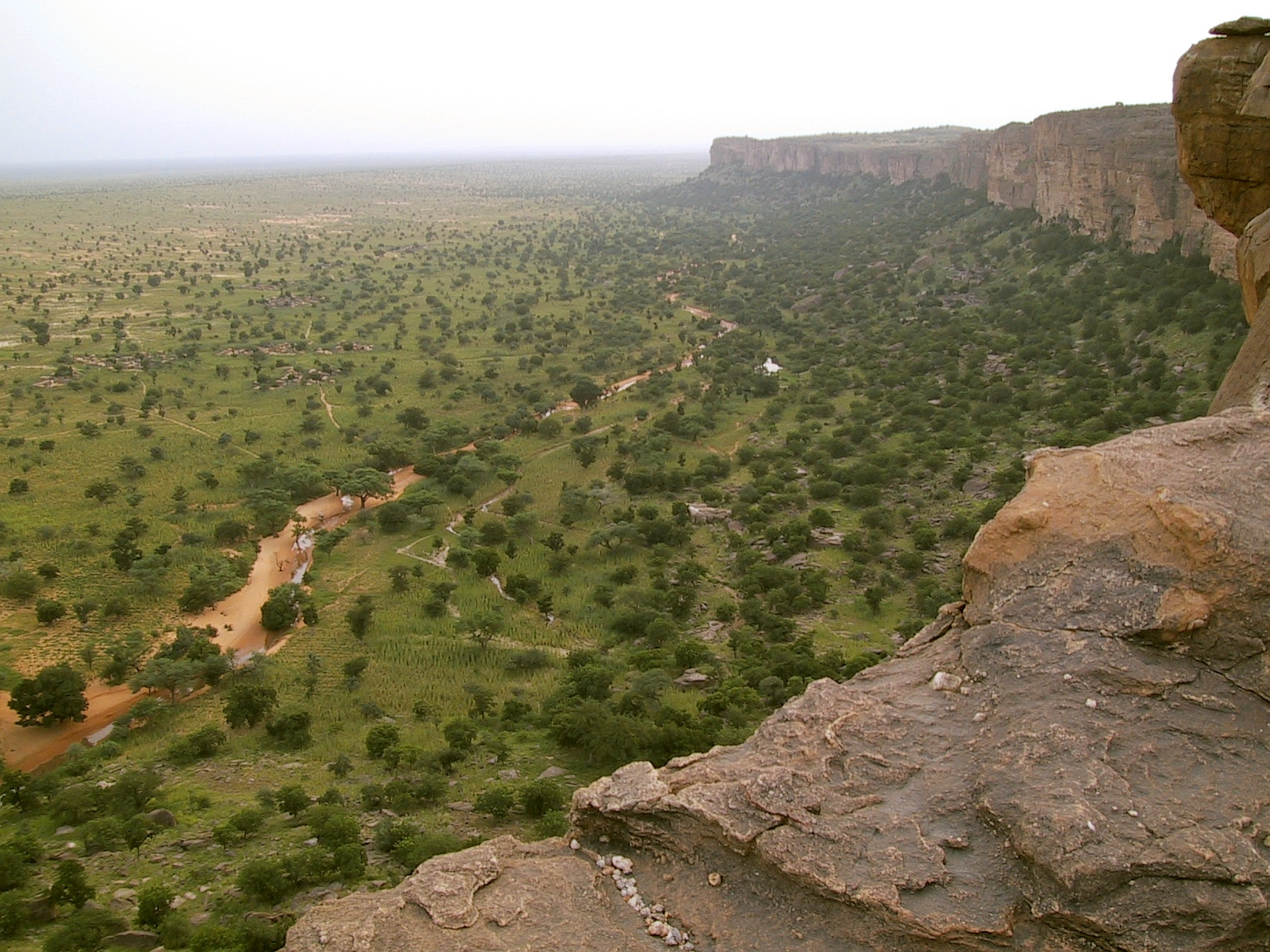
Sahel region of Mali.

To determine if a location has a semi-arid climate, the precipitation threshold must first be determined. The method used to find the precipitation threshold (in millimeters):

- multiply by 20 the average annual temperature in degrees Celsius and then
  - add 280 if at least 70% of the total precipitation falls in the summer half of the year (April–September in the northern hemisphere, October–March in the southern hemisphere)
  - add 140 if 30–70% of the total precipitation falls in the summer half of the year
  - add nothing if less than 30% of the total precipitation falls in the summer half of the year

If the area's annual precipitation in millimeters is less than the threshold but more than half or 50% the threshold, it is classified as a BS (steppe, semi-desert, or semi-arid climate).

Furthermore, to delineate hot semi-arid climates from cold semi-arid climates, a mean annual temperature of 18 °C (64.4 °F) is used as an isotherm. A location with a BS-type climate is classified as hot semi-arid (BSh) if its mean temperature is above this isotherm, and cold semi-arid (BSk) if not.

== Hot semi-arid climates ==
Regions with hot semi-arid climates

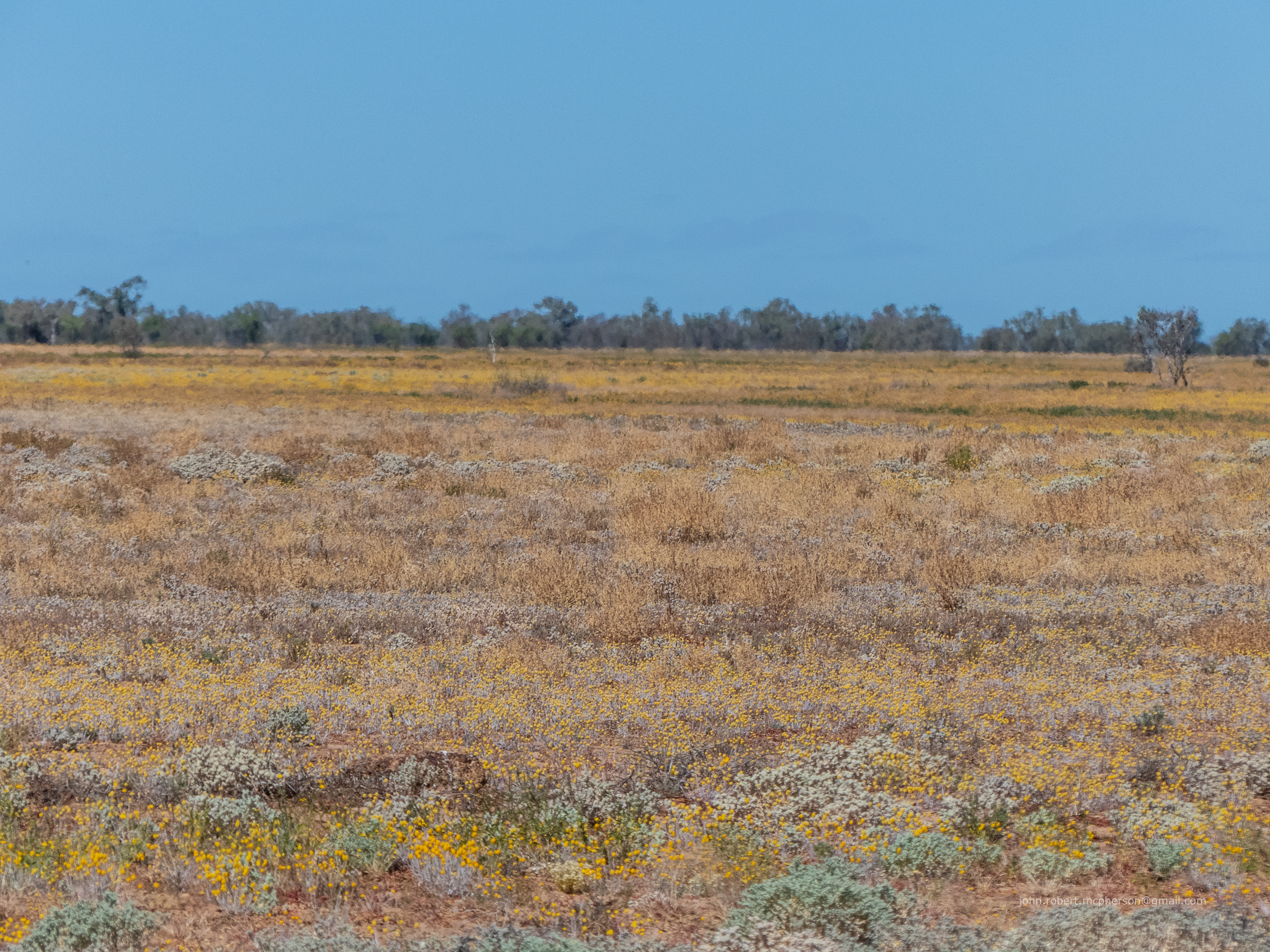
Semi-arid climate in Queensland, Australia.

Hot semi-arid climates (type "BSh") tend to be located from the high tens to mid-30s latitudes of the tropics and subtropics, typically in proximity to regions with a tropical savanna climate or a humid subtropical climate. These climates tend to have hot, or sometimes extremely hot, summers and warm to cool winters, with some to minimal precipitation. Hot semi-arid climates are most commonly found around the fringes of subtropical deserts.

Hot semi-arid climates are most commonly found in Africa, Australia, the Indian subcontinent and the outskirts of the Iranian plateau. In Australia, a large portion of the Outback surrounding the central desert regions lies within the hot semi-arid climate region. In South Asia, India and parts of Pakistan experience the seasonal effects of monsoons and feature short but well-defined wet seasons, but are not sufficiently wet overall to qualify as either a tropical savanna or a humid subtropical climate.

Hot semi-arid climates can also be found in parts of North America, such as most of northern Mexico, the ABC Islands, the rain shadows of Hispaniola's mountain ranges in the Dominican Republic and Haiti, parts of the Southwestern United States including California's Central Valley, and sections of South America such as the sertão, the Gran Chaco, and the poleward side of the arid deserts, where they typically feature a Mediterranean precipitation pattern, with generally rainless summers and wetter winters. They are also found in a few areas of Europe surrounding the Mediterranean Basin. In Europe, BSh climates are predominantly found in southeastern Spain. It can also be found primarily in parts of south Greece but also in marginal areas of Thessaloniki and Chalkidiki in north Greece, most of Formentera, marginal areas of Ibiza and marginal areas of Italy in Sicily, Sardinia and Lampedusa.

== Cold semi-arid climates ==
Regions with cold semi-arid climates

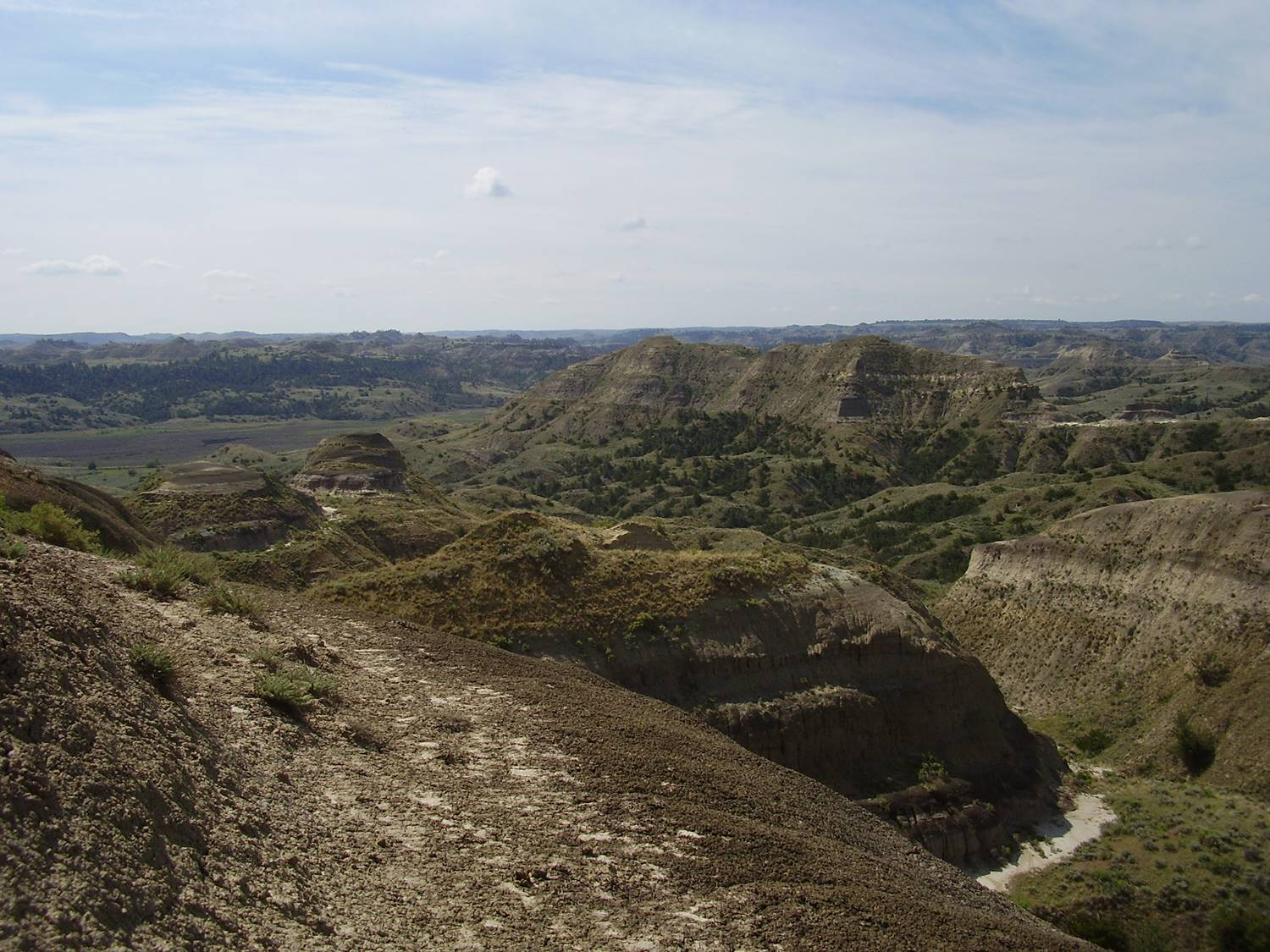
Semi-arid climate in Montana, United States.

Cold semi-arid climates (type "BSk") tend to be located in elevated portions of temperate zones generally from the mid-30s to low 50s latitudes, typically bordering a humid continental climate or a Mediterranean climate. They are also typically found in continental interiors some distance from large bodies of water. Cold semi-arid climates usually feature warm to hot dry summers, though their summers are typically not quite as hot as those of hot semi-arid climates. Unlike hot semi-arid climates, areas with cold semi-arid climates tend to have cold and possibly freezing winters. These areas usually see some snowfall during the winter, though snowfall is much lower than at locations at similar latitudes with more humid climates.

Areas featuring cold semi-arid climates tend to have higher elevations than areas with hot semi-arid climates, and tend to feature major temperature swings between day and night, sometimes by as much as 20 °C (36 °F) or more. These large diurnal temperature variations are seldom seen in hot semi-arid climates. Cold semi-arid climates at higher latitudes tend to have dry winters and wetter summers, while cold semi-arid climates at lower latitudes tend to have precipitation patterns more akin to Mediterranean climates, with dry summers, relatively wet winters, and even wetter springs and autumns.

Cold semi-arid climates are most commonly found in central Asia and the western US, as well as the Middle East and other parts of Asia. However, they can also be found in Northern Africa, South Africa, sections of South America, sections of interior southern Australia (e.g. Mildura) and several sections of Europe: a significant part of Spain, much of southern Ukraine, Russia, parts of inland Greece, and small parts of Romania, Italy, Portugal, Southern France and North Macedonia.

== Charts of selected cities ==
=== Hot semi-arid ===
Patos, Paraíba, Brazil

Climate chart (precipitation, max. and min. temperature)
J	F	M	A	M	J	J	A	S	O	N	D
66 32 22	139 32 22	213 31 22	177 30 22	55 29 21	28 27 21	12 27 20	3 28 20	1 30 20	4 31 21	8 32 21	22 32 21
- █ Average max. and min. temperatures in °C
- █ Precipitation totals in mm
Imperial conversion
J	F	M	A	M	J	J	A	S	O	N	D
2.6 90 71	5.5 89 71	8.4 88 71	7 86 71	2.2 84 71	1.1 81 69	0.5 81 67	0.1 82 67	0 85 69	0.2 88 69	0.3 89 70	0.9 90 71
- █ Average max. and min. temperatures in °F
- █ Precipitation totals in inches

Kalgoorlie, Australia

Climate chart (precipitation, max. and min. temperature)
J	F	M	A	M	J	J	A	S	O	N	D
27 34 18	32 32 18	25 30 16	20 25 13	25 21 9	27 18 6	24 17 5	21 19 6	14 22 8	16 26 11	19 29 14	16 32 17
- █ Average max. and min. temperatures in °C
- █ Precipitation totals in mm
Imperial conversion
J	F	M	A	M	J	J	A	S	O	N	D
1.1 92 65	1.3 90 64	1 85 61	0.8 78 55	1 69 48	1.1 64 43	1 62 41	0.8 66 42	0.5 72 47	0.6 79 52	0.7 84 58	0.6 90 62
- █ Average max. and min. temperatures in °F
- █ Precipitation totals in inches

Jaipur, India

Climate chart (precipitation, max. and min. temperature)
J	F	M	A	M	J	J	A	S	O	N	D
5.8 23 8	8.4 26 12	1.9 32 17	4.8 38 23	8.5 41 27	48 40 28	162 35 26	191 33 25	74 32 24	33 34 20	3.6 30 14	2.4 25 10
- █ Average max. and min. temperatures in °C
- █ Precipitation totals in mm
Imperial conversion
J	F	M	A	M	J	J	A	S	O	N	D
0.2 73 47	0.3 79 54	0.1 90 63	0.2 100 73	0.3 106 81	1.9 103 82	6.4 95 79	7.5 91 77	2.9 90 75	1.3 93 68	0.1 85 58	0.1 77 50
- █ Average max. and min. temperatures in °F
- █ Precipitation totals in inches

Niamey, Niger

Climate chart (precipitation, max. and min. temperature)
J	F	M	A	M	J	J	A	S	O	N	D
0 33 16	0 36 19	3.9 39 23	5.7 41 27	35 40 28	69 37 26	154 34 24	171 33 23	92 34 24	9.7 38 24	0.7 36 20	0 33 17
- █ Average max. and min. temperatures in °C
- █ Precipitation totals in mm
- Source: Deutscher Wetterdienst
Imperial conversion
J	F	M	A	M	J	J	A	S	O	N	D
0 91 61	0 96 66	0.2 102 73	0.2 106 80	1.4 104 82	2.7 99 78	6.1 93 75	6.7 91 74	3.6 94 74	0.4 100 76	0 97 67	0 92 62
- █ Average max. and min. temperatures in °F
- █ Precipitation totals in inches

Murcia, Spain

Climate chart (precipitation, max. and min. temperature)
J	F	M	A	M	J	J	A	S	O	N	D
27 17 5	19 19 6	30 21 8	30 24 11	21 27 14	17 32 18	1.2 34 21	12 35 22	38 31 19	27 26 15	29 21 9	33 18 6
- █ Average max. and min. temperatures in °C
- █ Precipitation totals in mm
- Source: Agencia Estatal de Meteorología
Imperial conversion
J	F	M	A	M	J	J	A	S	O	N	D
1.1 63 42	0.7 65 43	1.2 70 47	1.2 74 51	0.8 81 58	0.6 89 65	0 94 70	0.5 94 71	1.5 87 65	1.1 79 58	1.1 69 49	1.3 64 43
- █ Average max. and min. temperatures in °F
- █ Precipitation totals in inches

Monterrey, Mexico

Climate chart (precipitation, max. and min. temperature)
J	F	M	A	M	J	J	A	S	O	N	D
22 22 10	27 24 12	29 28 15	34 31 18	53 34 21	63 36 23	60 36 23	73 36 24	200 33 22	64 29 19	30 25 14	23 22 11
- █ Average max. and min. temperatures in °C
- █ Precipitation totals in mm
- Source: NOAA
Imperial conversion
J	F	M	A	M	J	J	A	S	O	N	D
0.9 72 50	1.1 75 54	1.1 82 59	1.3 88 65	2.1 92 70	2.5 96 74	2.4 96 74	2.9 97 74	7.9 91 71	2.5 84 65	1.2 76 57	0.9 71 51
- █ Average max. and min. temperatures in °F
- █ Precipitation totals in inches

=== Cold semi-arid ===
Bloemfontein, South Africa

Climate chart (precipitation, max. and min. temperature)
J	F	M	A	M	J	J	A	S	O	N	D
92 31 15	83 30 15	77 28 12	44 24 7	19 21 2	13 18 −2	5.3 18 −2	9.9 21 0	12 25 5	46 27 9	65 29 11	71 31 14
- █ Average max. and min. temperatures in °C
- █ Precipitation totals in mm
- Source: NOAA
Imperial conversion
J	F	M	A	M	J	J	A	S	O	N	D
3.6 87 59	3.3 86 58	3 82 54	1.7 76 45	0.7 70 36	0.5 65 29	0.2 65 28	0.4 70 33	0.5 77 40	1.8 81 48	2.6 84 53	2.8 87 57
- █ Average max. and min. temperatures in °F
- █ Precipitation totals in inches

Comodoro Rivadavia, Argentina

Climate chart (precipitation, max. and min. temperature)
J	F	M	A	M	J	J	A	S	O	N	D
11 26 14	17 25 13	28 23 11	32 19 9	34 15 6	37 11 3	21 11 3	19 13 4	20 16 5	13 19 7	14 22 10	13 25 12
- █ Average max. and min. temperatures in °C
- █ Precipitation totals in mm
- Source: Servicio Meteorológico Nacional,
Imperial conversion
J	F	M	A	M	J	J	A	S	O	N	D
0.4 79 56	0.7 77 55	1.1 73 52	1.3 66 47	1.3 58 42	1.5 52 38	0.8 52 37	0.8 56 39	0.8 60 41	0.5 66 45	0.6 72 50	0.5 76 54
- █ Average max. and min. temperatures in °F
- █ Precipitation totals in inches

Madrid, Spain

Climate chart (precipitation, max. and min. temperature)
J	F	M	A	M	J	J	A	S	O	N	D
32 10 3	34 12 4	35 16 6	46 19 8	48 23 12	20 29 17	9 33 20	10 32 19	24 27 16	64 20 11	52 14 6	42 10 4
- █ Average max. and min. temperatures in °C
- █ Precipitation totals in mm
- Source: Agencia Estatal de Meteorología
Imperial conversion
J	F	M	A	M	J	J	A	S	O	N	D
1.3 50 37	1.3 54 39	1.4 61 43	1.8 66 47	1.9 74 53	0.8 84 62	0.4 91 67	0.4 90 67	0.9 80 60	2.5 67 52	2 56 44	1.7 51 39
- █ Average max. and min. temperatures in °F
- █ Precipitation totals in inches

Reno, Nevada, United States

Climate chart (precipitation, max. and min. temperature)
J	F	M	A	M	J	J	A	S	O	N	D
26 8 −4	26 11 −2	19 14 1	12 18 3	12 23 8	13 29 11	4.6 33 14	5.8 33 13	8.9 28 9	13 21 4	21 13 −1	26 8 −4
- █ Average max. and min. temperatures in °C
- █ Precipitation totals in mm
- Source: NOAA
Imperial conversion
J	F	M	A	M	J	J	A	S	O	N	D
1 46 25	1 51 29	0.8 58 33	0.5 64 38	0.5 74 46	0.5 83 52	0.2 92 58	0.2 91 56	0.4 82 49	0.5 69 39	0.8 55 31	1 46 25
- █ Average max. and min. temperatures in °F
- █ Precipitation totals in inches

Astrakhan, Russia

Climate chart (precipitation, max. and min. temperature)
J	F	M	A	M	J	J	A	S	O	N	D
15 0 −7	12 2 −7	17 9 −1	25 18 6	28 25 13	25 30 18	22 33 20	17 31 18	16 25 13	19 17 6	17 7 0	18 1 −5
- █ Average max. and min. temperatures in °C
- █ Precipitation totals in mm
- Source: Pogoda.ru.net
Imperial conversion
J	F	M	A	M	J	J	A	S	O	N	D
0.6 32 20	0.5 35 20	0.7 48 30	1 64 43	1.1 76 55	1 86 64	0.9 91 68	0.7 89 65	0.6 76 55	0.7 62 43	0.7 45 32	0.7 34 24
- █ Average max. and min. temperatures in °F
- █ Precipitation totals in inches

Tianjin, China

Climate chart (precipitation, max. and min. temperature)
J	F	M	A	M	J	J	A	S	O	N	D
2.6 2 −7	6 6 −4	6.1 13 2	23 21 10	38 27 16	78 30 21	141 32 24	122 31 23	55 27 17	33 20 10	14 11 2	3.1 4 −4
- █ Average max. and min. temperatures in °C
- █ Precipitation totals in mm
- Source: China Meteorological Administration
Imperial conversion
J	F	M	A	M	J	J	A	S	O	N	D
0.1 36 20	0.2 42 25	0.2 55 36	0.9 69 49	1.5 80 60	3.1 86 69	5.6 89 74	4.8 87 73	2.2 80 63	1.3 68 50	0.5 51 35	0.1 39 24
- █ Average max. and min. temperatures in °F
- █ Precipitation totals in inches

== See also ==
- Continental climate
- Dry climate
- Desert climate
- Dust Bowl (an era of devastating dust storms, mostly in the 1930s, in semi-arid areas on the Great Plains of the United States and Prairies of Canada)
- Goyder's Line (a boundary marking the limit of semi-arid climates in the Australian state of South Australia)
- Köppen climate classification
- Palliser's Triangle (semi-arid area of Canada)
- Ustic (Soil Moisture Regime)
- Wave height
