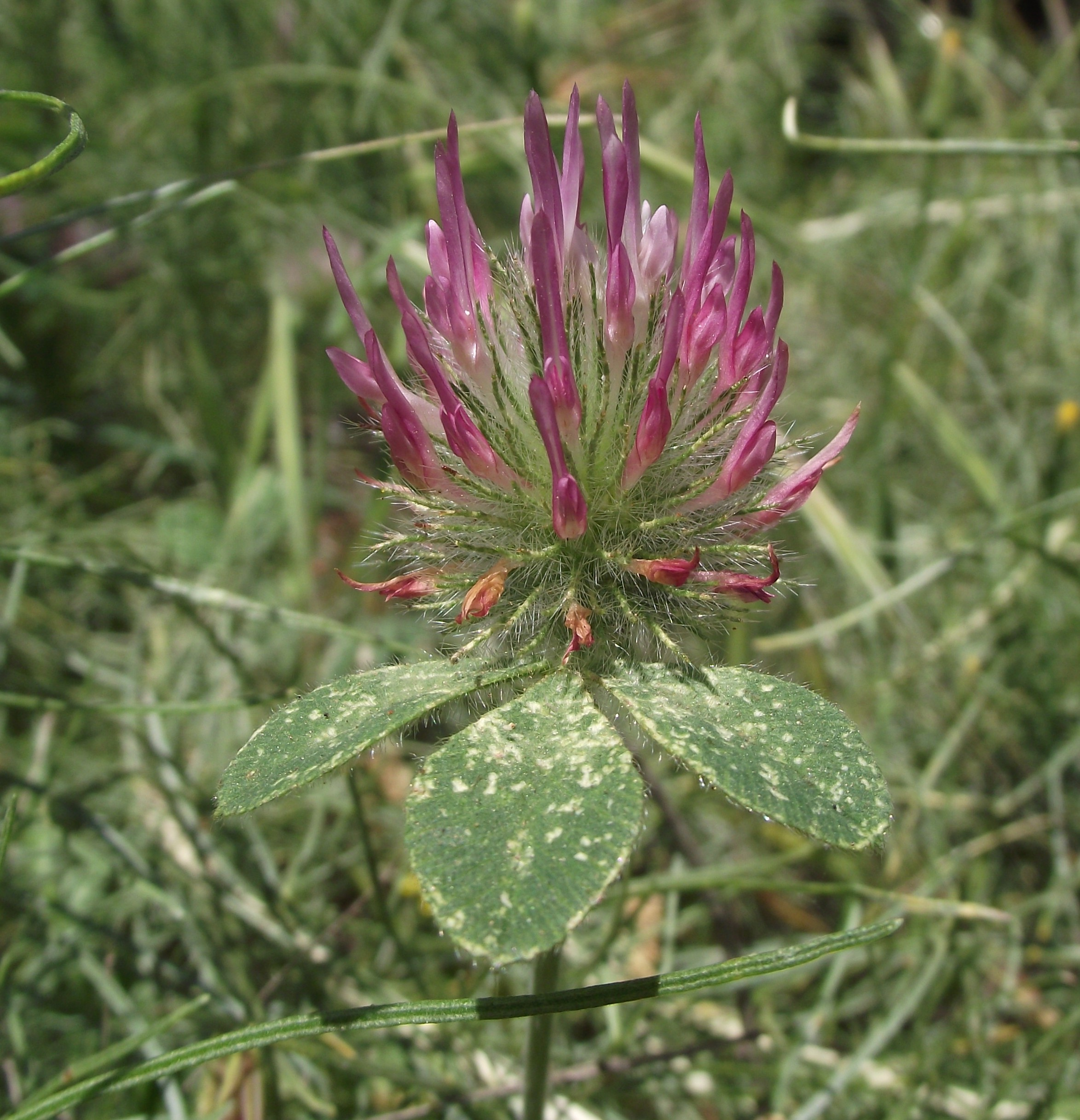

Scientific classification
- Kingdom: Plantae
- Clade: Tracheophytes
- Clade: Angiosperms
- Clade: Eudicots
- Clade: Rosids
- Order: Fabales
- Family: Fabaceae
- Subfamily: Faboideae
- Genus: Trifolium
- Species: T. hirtum

Binomial name
- Trifolium hirtum All.

= Trifolium hirtum =

Species of legume

Trifolium hirtum, commonly known as rose clover, is a species of flowering plant in the legume family, Fabaceae. It is native to Eurasia and North Africa, and has been introduced and cultivated elsewhere.

== Description ==
The plant is characterized as a hairy annual herb with an erect growth habit. Its leaves are trifoliate, featuring oval-shaped leaflets that measure up to 2.5 centimeters (1 in) in length. Additionally, the leaves possess bristle-tipped stipules.

The inflorescence is a flowerhead-like cluster approximately 1.5 cm in diameter. Each individual flower consists of a calyx made up of sepals with elongated, needle-like lobes. These lobes may harden and become bristle-like as the plant ages. The calyces are covered in long, fine hairs. The flower's corolla is pink in color and measures between 1 and 1.5 cm in length, adding a vibrant hue to the inflorescence.

== Distribution and habitat ==
Originally native to Europe, Western Asia, and North Africa, T. hirtum has been introduced to other regions, including North America. In the United States, it was notably introduced to California from Turkey in the 1940s, initially as a forage crop to support animal agriculture. Today, it has become a widespread roadside weed in California, sometimes considered invasive, adapting well to the local climate and soil conditions.

== Ecology ==
While Trifolium hirtum has benefits as a cover crop and fodder, its introduction to non-native areas has sometimes led to it becoming invasive, potentially disrupting local ecosystems and outcompeting native plant species. Therefore, management practices may be needed to control its spread in certain contexts.

== Cultivation and uses ==
Rose clover is often cultivated as a cover crop, providing various ecological benefits such as soil stabilization and nitrogen fixation due to its leguminous nature. It is also utilized as animal fodder, particularly for grazing livestock like cattle and sheep. However, its widespread adoption has led it to become invasive in some areas, outcompeting native flora.
