= Ustic =

Soil type

Ustic Moisture Regime
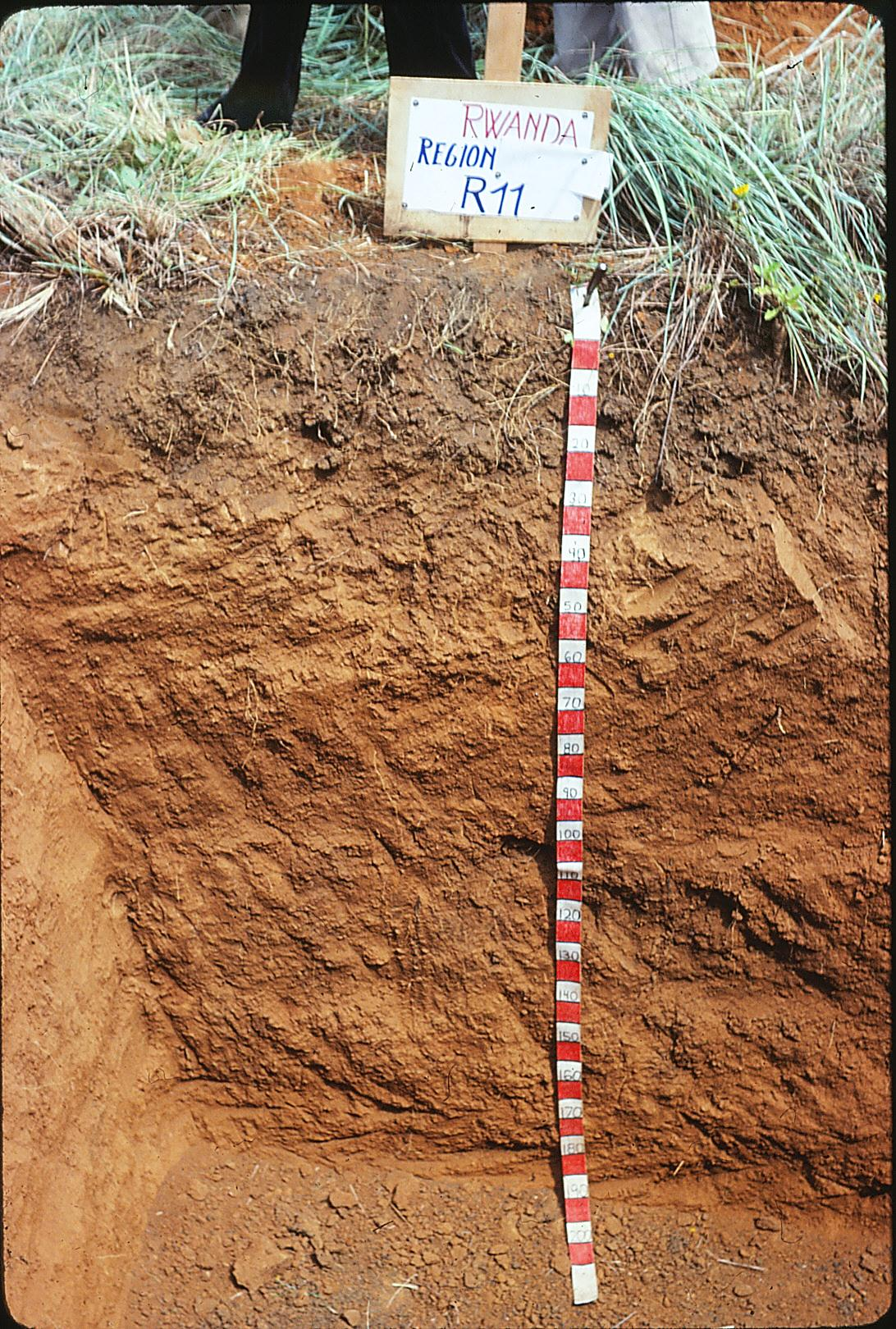
- Ustic Kandihumult (Fine, Kaolinitic, Isohyperthermic)
- Used in: WRB, USDA soil taxonomy
- Climate: Semi-arid

Ustic is a class of soil moisture regime. It is one of a range of different soil moisture regimes, such as: aquic moisture regime, aridic moisture regime, udic moisture regime and xeric moisture regime. The ustic moisture regime is intermediate between the aridic regime and the udic regime.

== Definition ==
The ustic moisture regime (Latin: ustus, burnt) applies to soils in which moisture is present, but limited, at times in which conditions are suitable for plant growth. A suborder of Mollisol, the ustic moisture regime is wetter than the aridic moisture regime and drier than the udic moisture regime. For a soil to be classified as ustic, averaged across the year, stored moisture plus rainfall is less than the amount of water lost from the soil via evapotranspiration. The ustic moisture regime is common in semi-arid and sub-humid climates.

== Geography and Climate of Ustic Soils ==
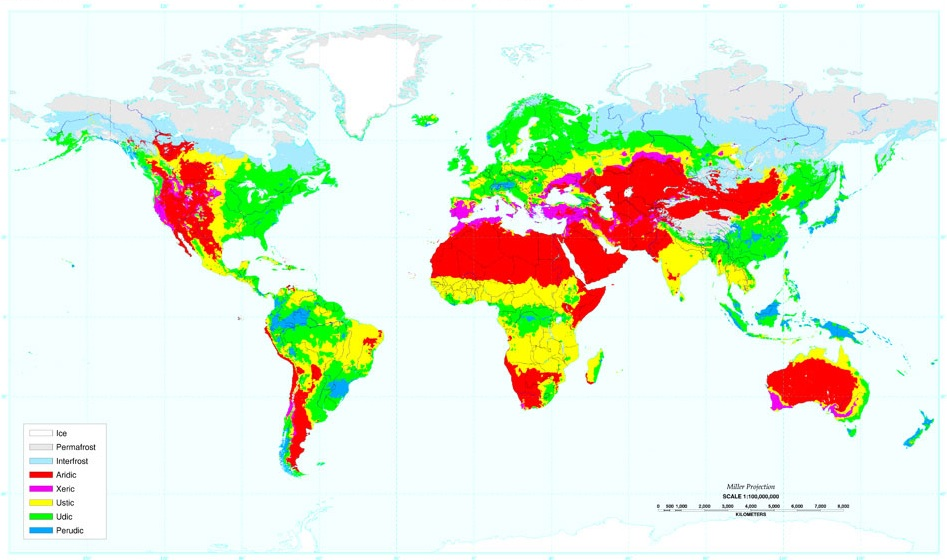
Global locations of Soil moisture regimes

There are certain climate conditions which characterises a particular soil as ustic: the soil temperature must be 22 °C (degrees Celsius) or above annually, or winter contra summer soil temperatures must vary by less than 6 °C at a particular depth of 50 cm below the soil surface. The soil moisture control section of ustic soil is dry, in some or most parts, for at least 90 or more cumulative days in a normal year. Ustic soil is also moist, in some parts, for more than 180 cumulative or 90 consecutive days per year.

If the soil temperature is 22 °C and above annually, or if winter contra summer soil temperatures vary by more than 6 °C at a particular depth of 50 cm below the soil surface, the soil moisture control section of ustic soil is dry, in some or most parts, for at least 90 or more cumulative days in a normal year. Although it is not dry in all parts for more than half of these cumulative days, at a soil depth of 50 cm the soil temperature is greater than 5 °C. In the event that the moisture control section is moist in all parts for 45 or more consecutive days in the four months after the winter solstice, the moisture control section is then dry in all parts for less than 45 consecutive days in the four months after the summer solstice.

Regions with an ustic soil moisture regime often experience erratic rainfall which mostly occurs during the growing season. Summer droughts are erratic, but frequent. Ustolls (soils characterized with the ustic soil moisture regime) are the most commonly occurring suborder of Mollisols in the U.S., primarily located in the southern Great Plains, New Mexico, Texas, and Oklahoma. Most Ustolls display an accumulation of calcium carbonate in the soil profile - a calcic horizon.

The ustic soil moisture regime is also common in Central Africa (Zambia, Tanzania, Angola), in India, and in some countries of Eastern Europe and South America.

== Characteristics of Alternative Moisture Regimes ==
Soil Moisture regimes affects soil genesis (formation), and the usage and maintenance of soil condition, so they are used as a soil classification criterion for soils with similar properties and Morphology. The following are the four other major soil moisture regimes:

Aquic (or Perudic)

Soils that have the aquic moisture regime are virtually free of dissolved oxygen because they are saturated by water. To have an aquic moisture regime, a soil must be saturated for at least a few days a year, because it's implicit in the concept that dissolved oxygen is virtually absent. It is also implicit that the soil temperature is above biologic zero for some time while the soil is saturated, because dissolved oxygen is removed from ground water by respiration of micro-organisms. The level of ground water fluctuates with the seasons; it is highest in the rainy season or in fall, winter, or spring when cold weather virtually stops evapotranspiration.

Udic

The soil moisture control section is not dry in any part for around 90 days in the udic moisture regime. The soil moisture control section becomes udic if the mean soil temperature is lower than 22 °C and the mean summer and winter soil temperatures (at a depth of 50 cm from the soil surface) differ by 6 °C or more, is dry in all parts for less than 45 consecutives days in the 4 months following the summer solstice. Soils that have an udic moisture regime commonly occur in areas of humid climates that have well distributed rainfall: i.e. they have adequate summer or winter rains, and generally cool summers.

Aridic

The moisture control section in the aridic moisture regime is dry when the temperature of soil, at a depth of 50 cm from the soil surface, is above 5 °C for more than half of the cumulative days per year and moist when it's above 8 °C for less than 90 consecutive days. Soils that have an aridic moisture regime normally occur in an arid or a semi-arid climate.

Xeric

The xeric (Greek: xeros, dry) moisture regime is the typical moisture regime in areas where winters are cool and moist and summers are warm and dry - i.e. Mediterranean climates. The soil moisture control section is dry in summer and moist in winter in all parts for 45 or more consecutive days in 4 months. Also, the moisture control section is moist when the temperature of the soil, at a depth of 50 cm from the soil surface, is higher than 6 °C for more than half of the cumulative days per year, or higher than 8 °C for 90 or more consecutive days. The mean annual temperature of the soil is lower than 22 °C, and there is a difference of 6 °C between the mean soil temperature in summer and winter.

== Plants in the Ustic Moisture Regime ==
A principle characteristic of ustic soil is that it is preferable for the cultivation of crops that are tolerant, albeit resistant, to periods of drought. Moisture regimes have significant practical importance in the field of agriculture. For example, under an ustic moisture regime the commercial growth of maize is generally considered to require supplemental irrigation: however, this is not required under an udic moisture regime.

== Advantages ==
In many regions possessing thermic or mesic soil temperature regimes, there are relatively short warm seasons followed by a longer cold season, limiting the period during which grain can be harvested and re-planted. Consequently, these regions require rapid sowing, harvesting, transport and storage, all of which increase the costs of the operation.

Regions possessing an ustic soil moisture regime have a significantly large window for the harvesting of crops at the onset of the dry season. For example, Brazilian farmers in the Cerrado region leverage on the warm dry season to harvest their grain at a more leisurely pace. This allows them to simultaneously enjoy greater efficiency and reduced costs. In certain parts of the Cerrado, the cultivation of two crops (usually soybeans and sorghum) are possible annually.

== Gallery ==
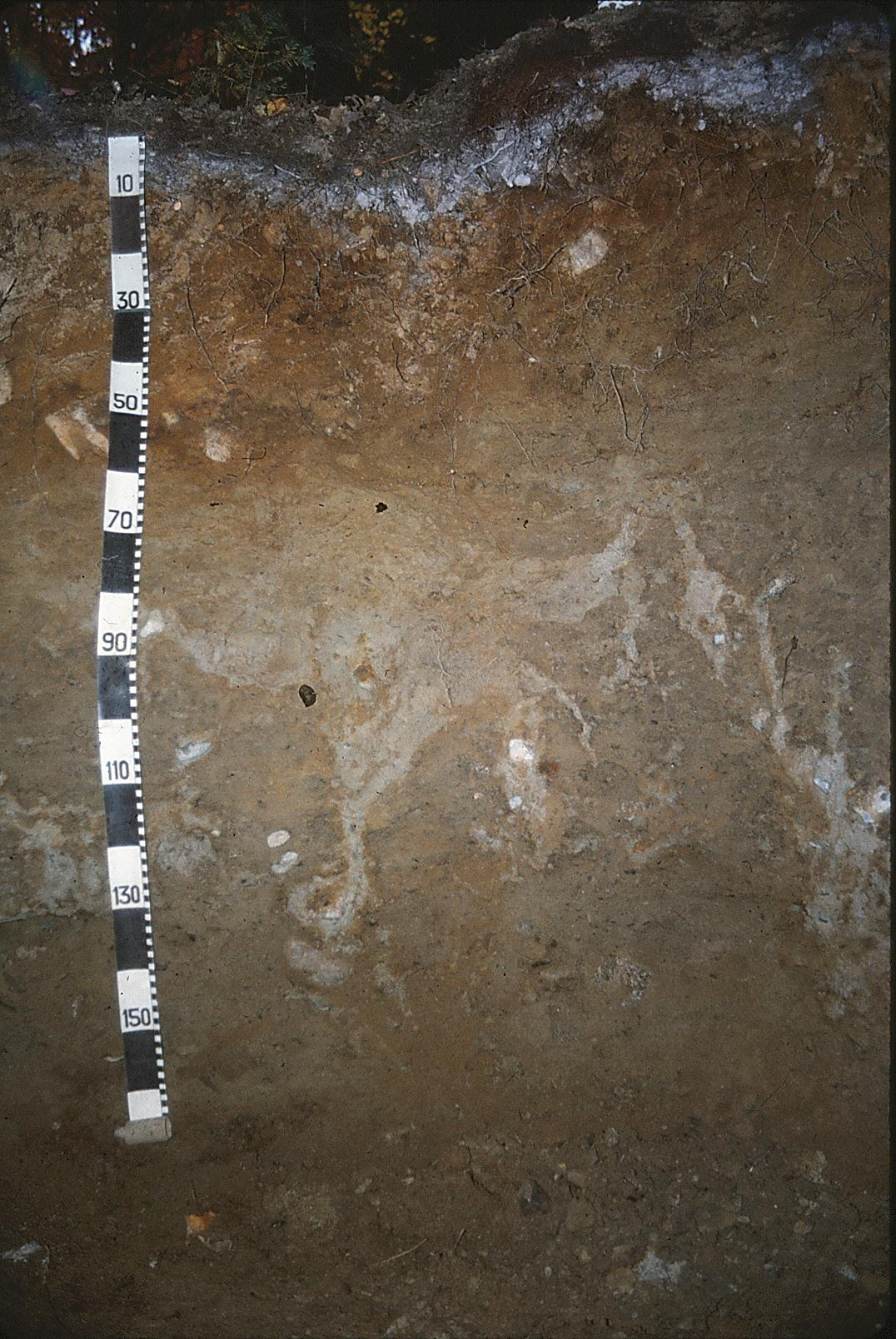
Aquic moisture regime

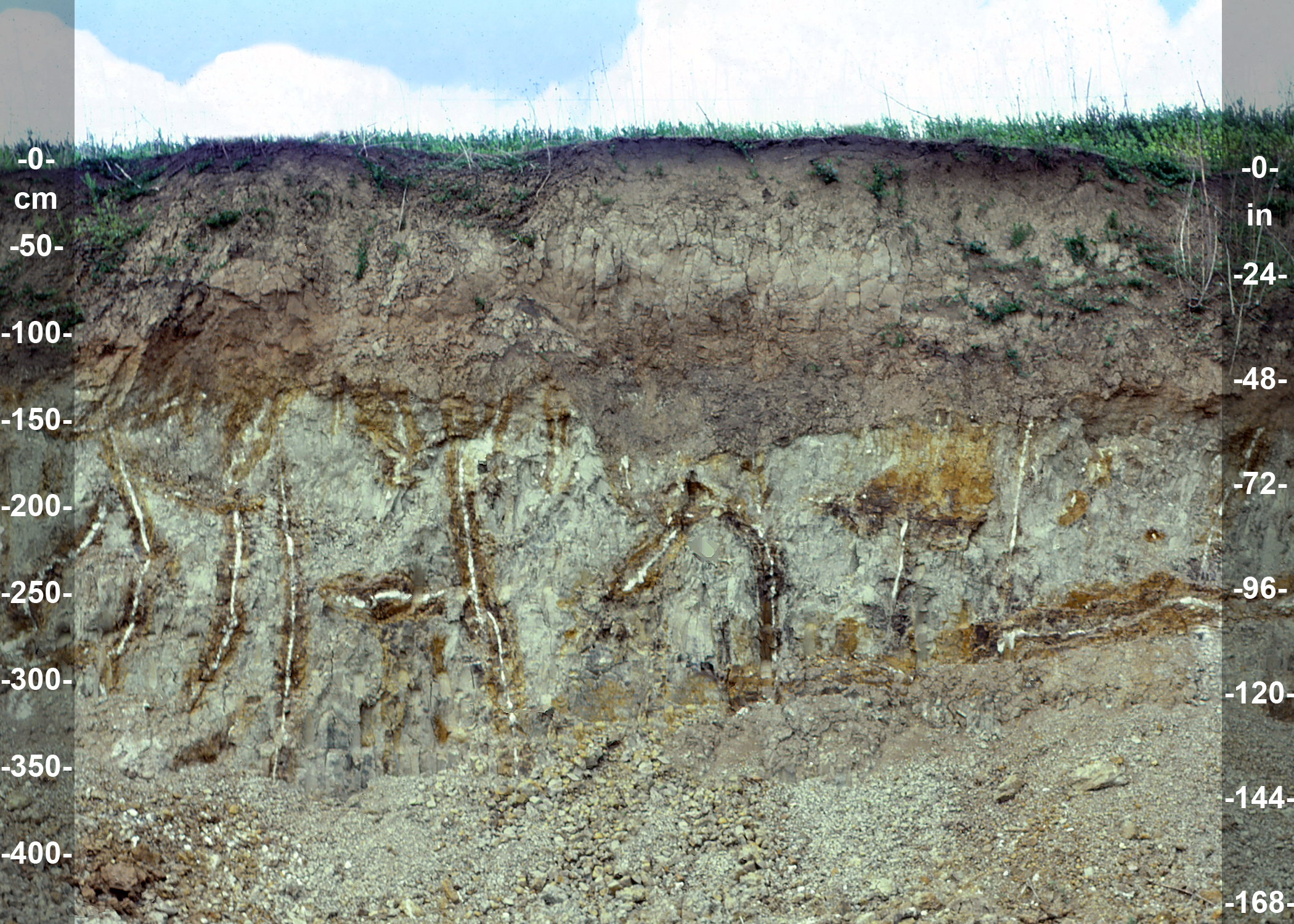
Udic moisture regime

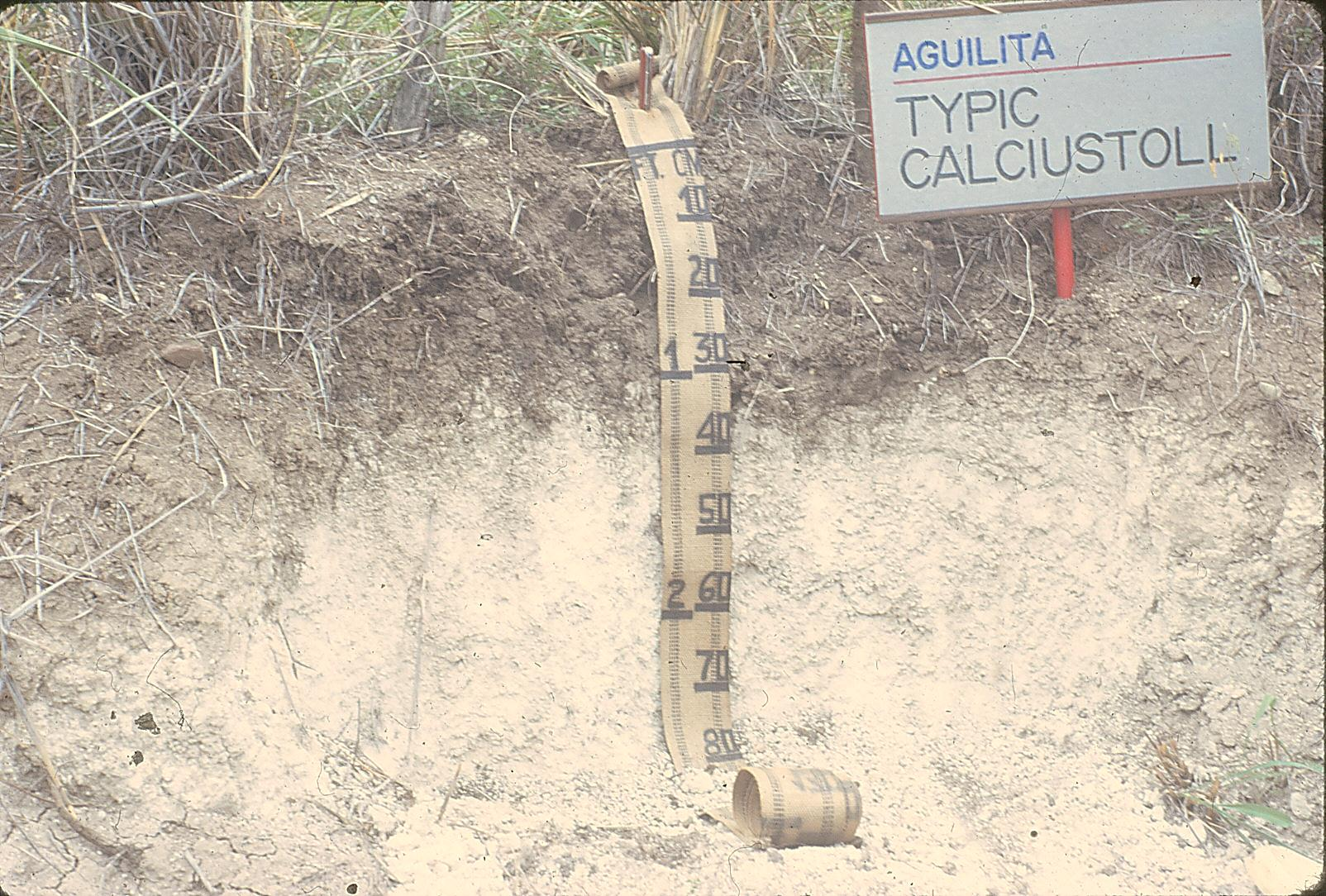
Aridic moisture regime

== See also ==
- Pedogenesis
- Pedology
- Soil classification
- Soil science
- Soil type
- USDA soil taxonomy
