= Udic moisture regime =

Soil classification based on water availability

The udic moisture regime is common to soils of humid climates which have well-distributed rainfall, or which have enough rain in summer so that the amount of stored moisture plus rainfall is approximately equal to, or exceeds, the amount of evapotranspiration. Water moves down through the soil at some time in most years.

Some soil suborders, like udalf (alfisol) and udept (inceptisol), have an udic moisture regime.

== See also ==
- Pedogenesis
- Pedology (soil study)
- Soil classification
- Soil science
- Soil type
- USDA soil taxonomy
- Ustic (Soil Moisture Regime)
