= Drift Creek (Siletz Bay) =

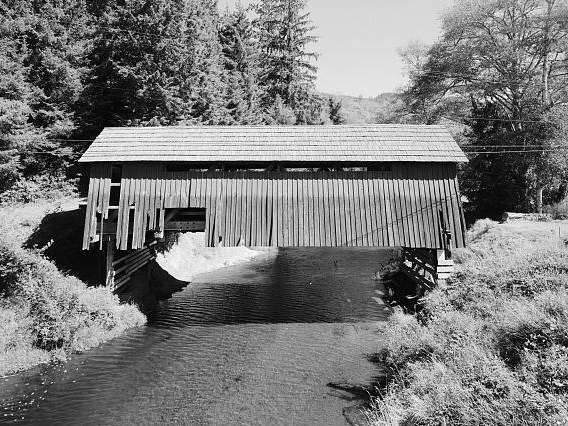
- Drift Creek Bridge formerly spanned the creek near the Oregon Coast

- Location of the mouth of Drift Creek in Oregon

Location
- Country: United States
- State: Oregon
- County: Lincoln

Physical characteristics
- Source: near Stott Mountain
  - location: Siuslaw National Forest, Central Oregon Coast Range
  - coordinates: 44°56′53″N 123°47′10″W
  - elevation: 2,767 ft (843 m)
- Mouth: Siletz River
  - location: Siletz Bay
  - coordinates: 44°54′40″N 124°00′35″W
  - elevation: 7 ft (2.1 m)
- Length: 18 mi (29 km)

Drift Creek is a tributary, about 18 miles (29 km) long, of Siletz Bay in the U.S. state of Oregon. The creek begins near Stott Mountain in the Central Oregon Coast Range in Lincoln County and follows a winding course generally west through the Siuslaw National Forest to enter the bay south of Lincoln City on the Pacific Ocean. It passes under U.S. Route 101 just before reaching the bay.

Named tributaries of Drift Creek from source to mouth are Nelson, Fowler, Barn, Smith, Sampson, Wildcat, and North creeks. Then Quarry, Odell, Bluff, Gordey, and Anderson creeks.

== Covered bridge ==
Until being dismantled and destroyed in 1997 and rebuilt over Bear Creek, a Salmon River tributary to the north and further inland, the Drift Creek Bridge was the state's closest covered bridge to the ocean. Drift Creek Park, managed by Lincoln County, remains open at the former bridge site along South Drift Creek Road. It consists of posted information about the bridge and directions to its new location.

== Recreation ==
=== Hiking ===
Drift Creek Falls Trail leads 1.5 miles (2.4 km) from the Drift Creek Trailhead along Forest Road 17 to a 240-foot (73 m) suspension bridge overlooking Drift Creek Falls. The waterfall is 75 feet (23 m) high.

=== Fishing ===
Drift Creek supports populations of cutthroat trout, steelhead, and Chinook salmon. According to Fishing in Oregon, this creek and a Drift Creek in the Alsea River watershed are important in efforts to restore anadromous fish runs in Oregon. The stream has limited road access, and angling in the upper reaches requires hiking via Drift Creek Trail or logging roads. Much of the angling is catch-and-release.

== See also ==
- List of rivers of Oregon
