= Treat River =

- Location of the mouth of the Treat River in Oregon

Location
- Country: United States
- State: Oregon
- County: Lincoln County

Physical characteristics
- Source: Central Oregon Coast Range
  - location: Siuslaw National Forest
  - coordinates: 45°00′16″N 123°47′44″W
  - elevation: 2,064 ft (629 m)
- Mouth: Salmon River
  - coordinates: 45°01′12″N 123°51′01″W
  - elevation: 223 ft (68 m)

The Treat River is a short tributary of the Salmon River in Lincoln County, in the U.S. state of Oregon. It begins in the Siuslaw National Forest in the Central Oregon Coast Range and flows generally northwest. It enters the larger stream between the H. B. Van Duzer Forest State Scenic Corridor along Oregon Route 18 and the unincorporated community of Rose Lodge. It has no named tributaries.

According to the Northwest Waterfall Survey, there is a waterfall about 100 feet (30 m) upstream of the mouth of the Treat River. Its unofficial name is Treat River Falls, the survey says, though that may be a pseudonym for Anna's Falls.

== See also ==
- List of rivers of Oregon
