= Devil's Staircase Wilderness =

U.S. wilderness area in Oregon, United States

- IUCN category Ib (wilderness area)
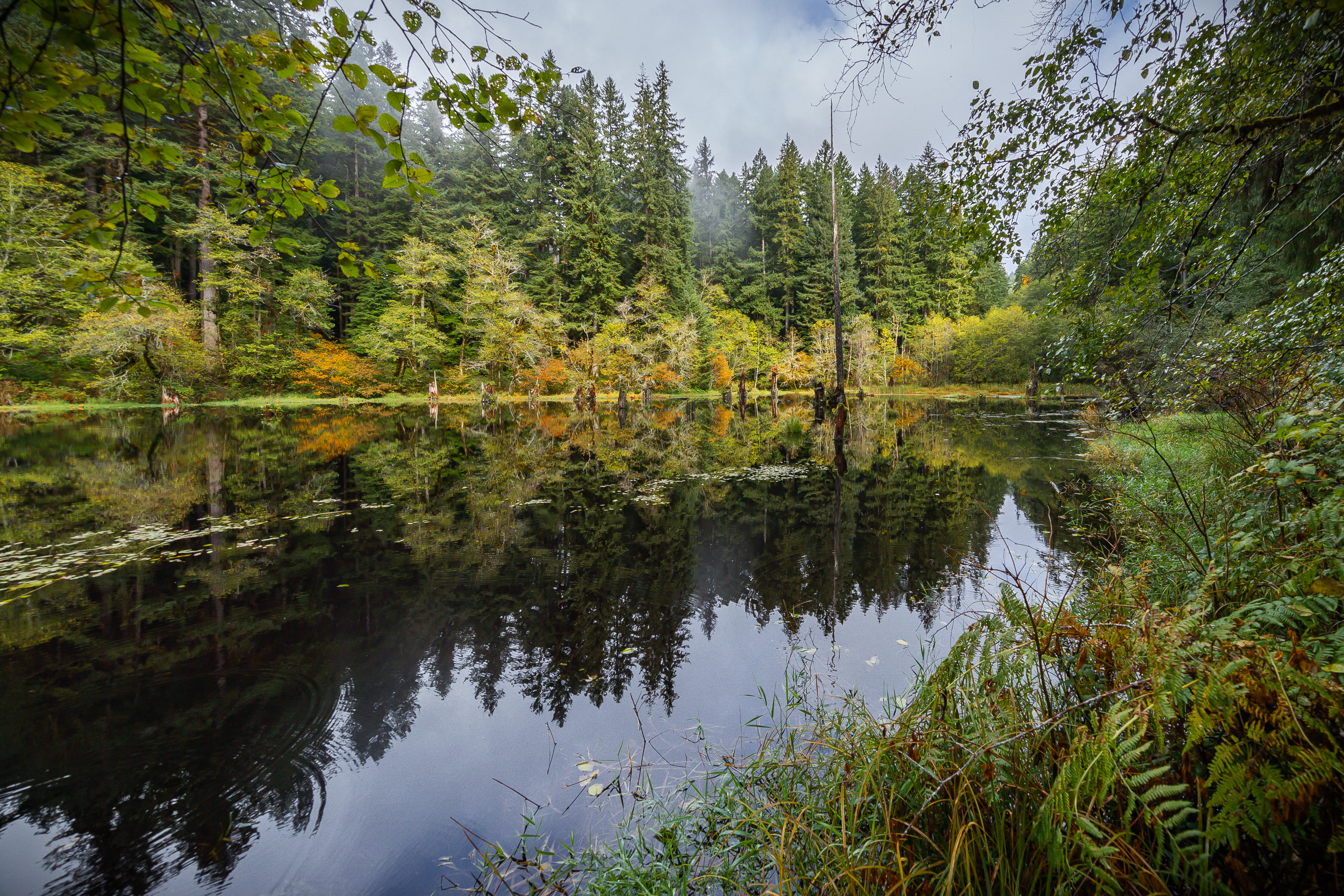
- Wasson Lake in Devil's Staircase Wilderness

- Location within Oregon Location within the United States
- Coordinates: 43.72°N 123.92°W
- Governing body: Bureau of Land Management and the United States Forest Service
- Website: https://www.blm.gov/programs/national-conservation-lands/oregon-washington/devils-staircase

The Devil's Staircase Wilderness is a forested wilderness area adjacent to the Umpqua River in the Southern Oregon Coast Range of the U.S. state of Oregon. It was officially designated in March 2019.

The wilderness is one of a handful of federally protected old-growth forest stands in the Oregon Coast Range, others being the Drift Creek Wilderness, the Rock Creek Wilderness, and the Cummins Creek Wilderness, all of which were established in 1984.
