= West Fork Smith River =

- Location of the mouth of the West Fork Smith River in Oregon
- Etymology: Jedediah Smith, early 19th century explorer

Location
- Country: United States
- State: Oregon
- County: Douglas

Physical characteristics
- Source: Central Oregon Coast Range
  - location: near Roman Nose Mountain, Siuslaw National Forest
  - coordinates: 43°55′09″N 123°43′19″W
  - elevation: 2,263 ft (690 m)
- Mouth: Smith River
  - location: River mile 35 (river km 56) along the Smith River
  - coordinates: 43°48′22″N 123°46′00″W
  - elevation: 249 ft (76 m)
- Length: 10 mi (16 km)

The West Fork Smith River is a tributary, about 10 miles (16 km) long, of the Smith River in Douglas County in the U.S. state of Oregon. It begins in the Central Oregon Coast Range near Roman Nose Mountain and flows generally south to meet the larger river 35 miles (56 km) from its confluence with the Umpqua River near Reedsport. The entire course of the river lies within the Siuslaw National Forest.

The river supports populations of Chinook and coho salmon, steelhead, cutthroat trout, and lamprey. Fishing in Oregon, a sportfishing guide, describes the river as "a beautiful wild trout stream".

Degraded in past decades by logging, splash dams, and in-stream debris removal, the stream has been chosen for restoration. Using grant money from the state, the Partnership for Umpqua Rivers has been placing thousands of boulders in the streambed to improve the spawning, rearing, and refugia habitat for fish. The project involves a 4.5-mile (7.2 km) stretch of the river.

== Tributaries ==
The named tributaries of the West Fork Smith River from source to mouth are Gold, Beaver, Moore, Crane, and Coon creeks.

== See also ==
- List of rivers of Oregon
