= Bear Creek (Lincoln County, Oregon) =

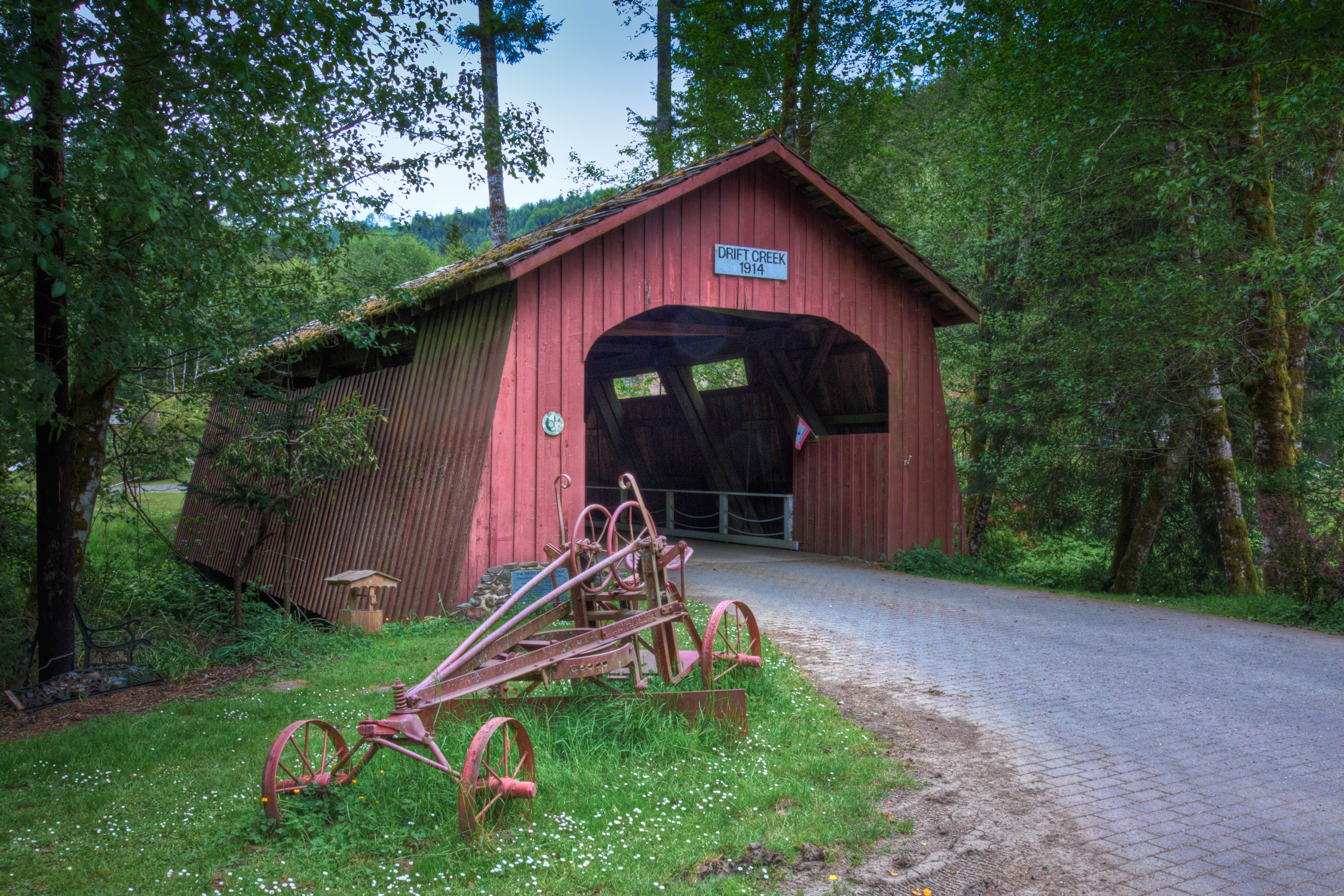
- Covered bridge over Bear Creek, built from former Drift Creek Bridge timbers

- Location of the mouth of Bear Creek in Oregon

Location
- Country: United States
- State: Oregon
- County: Lincoln

Physical characteristics
- Source: near Cougar Mountain
  - location: Central Oregon Coast Range, Siuslaw National Forest
  - coordinates: 44°57′50″N 123°51′12″W
  - elevation: 1,445 ft (440 m)
- Mouth: Salmon River
  - location: near Rose Lodge
  - coordinates: 45°00′12″N 123°54′13″W
  - elevation: 82 ft (25 m)

Bear Creek is a tributary of the Salmon River in the Central Oregon Coast Range in the United States. It begins in the Siuslaw National Forest and flows generally northwest through Lincoln County to meet the river between Rose Lodge and Otis. Named tributaries from source to mouth are McMullen, Tarry, Southman, and Morton creeks.

A covered bridge over Bear Creek is made from timbers salvaged from the former Drift Creek Bridge, also in Lincoln County. In 1988, county officials closed the old bridge after rot and insect damage made it unsafe. They had the bridge dismantled 1997 and gave the timbers to Laura and Kerry Sweitz, who owned land along Bear Creek 8 miles (13 km) north of the Drift Creek site. In 2000, the Sweitz family rebuilt the bridge and granted a permanent public easement for its use. The bridge carries North Rogers Lane, off Bear Creek Road, over the creek.

== See also ==
- List of rivers of Oregon
