= North Fork Smith River (Umpqua River tributary) =

- Location of the mouth of the North Fork Smith River in Oregon
- Etymology: Jedediah Smith, early 19th century explorer

Location
- Country: United States
- State: Oregon
- County: Douglas

Physical characteristics
- Source: Central Oregon Coast Range
  - location: near Roman Nose Mountain, Siuslaw National Forest
  - coordinates: 43°55′15″N 123°43′42″W
  - elevation: 2,140 ft (650 m)
- Mouth: Smith River
  - location: River mile 16 (river km 26) on the Smith River
  - coordinates: 43°46′49″N 123°56′14″W
  - elevation: 30 ft (9.1 m)
- Length: 34 mi (55 km)
- Basin size: 69 sq mi (180 km^{2})
- Discharge
  - average: 214 cu ft/s (6.1 m^{3}/s)

The North Fork Smith River is a 34-mile (55 km) tributary of the Smith River in Douglas County in the U.S. state of Oregon. It begins in the Central Oregon Coast Range near Roman Nose Mountain and flows generally southwest to meet the larger river 16 miles (26 km) from its confluence with the Umpqua River at Reedsport. The entire course of the North Fork lies within the Siuslaw National Forest.

== Recreation ==
The North Fork supports populations of cutthroat trout and steelhead suitable for sportfishing. Bank access is good where land owners allow it, but anglers often prefer drift fishing from boats. Watercraft can be launched from near bridge crossings and taken out above the rapids at Culvert Hole, about 5 miles (8 km) from the river mouth.

The North Fork Smith Trail, open all year, runs along the North Fork for 6.5 miles (10.5 km) through a forest of old-growth Douglas firs to Lower Kentucky Falls along Kentucky Creek. There it connects to the 2.2-mile (3.5 km) Kentucky Falls Trail, which follows the creek through old-growth to Upper Kentucky Falls. Lower Kentucky Falls is a 100-foot (30 m) twin fall at the confluence of the river and the creek.

== Tributaries ==
Named tributaries of the North Fork Smith River from source to mouth are Jump, Sheep Herder, and Kentucky creeks. Then the Middle Fork North Fork Smith River and the West Branch North Fork Smith River followed by Paxton, Harlan, Sulphur, Chapman, Georgia, and McKinney creeks. Then come Edmonds, Johnson, Dry, Straddle, and Railroad creeks.

== See also ==
- List of rivers of Oregon
