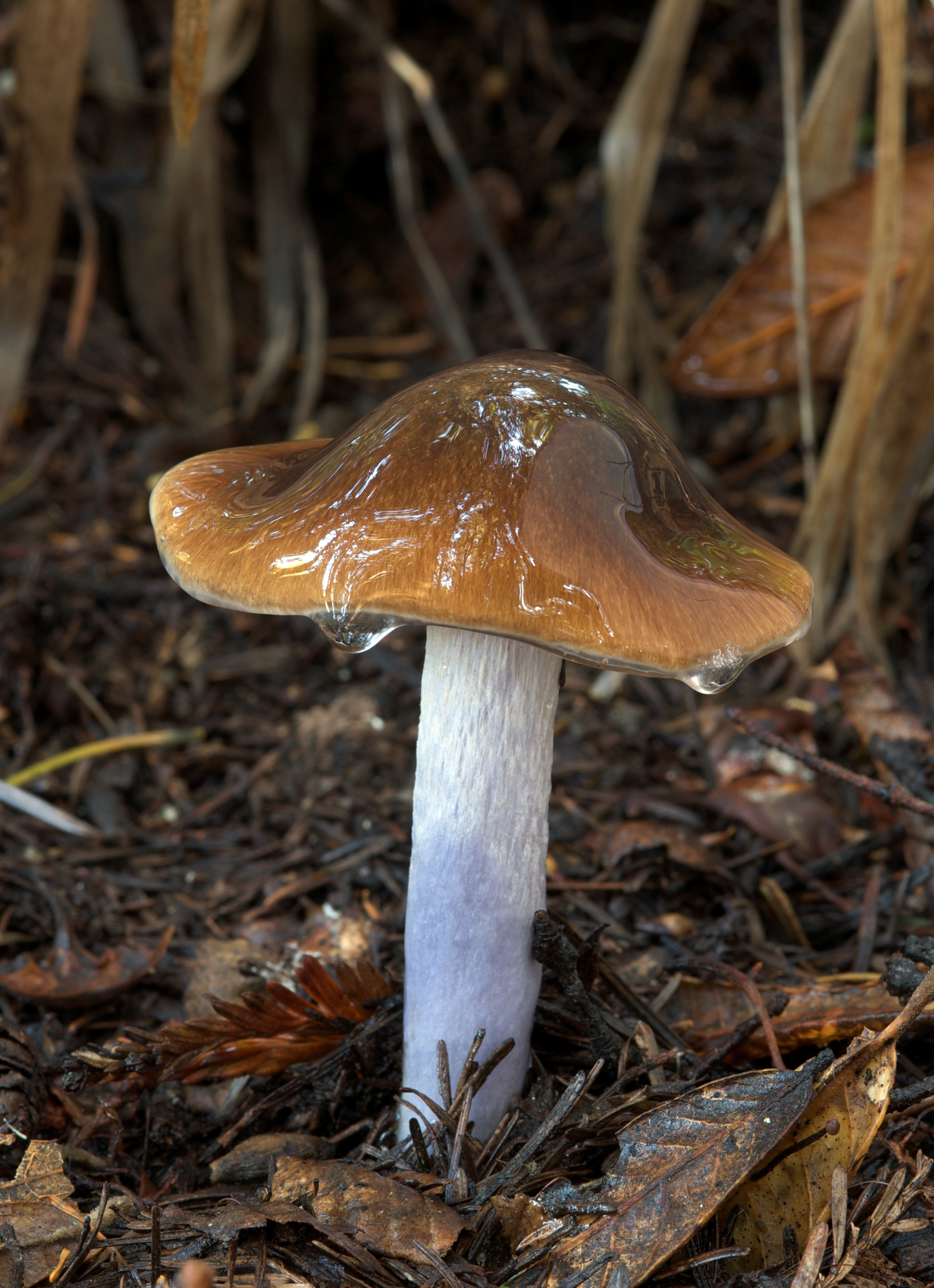

Scientific classification
- Kingdom: Fungi
- Division: Basidiomycota
- Class: Agaricomycetes
- Order: Agaricales
- Family: Cortinariaceae
- Genus: Cortinarius
- Species: C. vanduzerensis

Binomial name
- Cortinarius vanduzerensis A.H.Sm. & Trappe (1972)

= Cortinarius vanduzerensis =

Species of fungus

Cortinarius vanduzerensis Mycological characteristics
- Gills on hymenium
- Cap is conical or campanulate
- Hymenium is adnate or adnexed
- Stipe has a cortina
- Spore print is reddish-brown
- Ecology is mycorrhizal
- Edibility is unknown

Cortinarius vanduzerensis is a species of fungus described as new to science in 1972. The fruit bodies of the fungus, or mushrooms, have a slimy dark chestnut-brown cap that becomes deeply radially grooved or corrugated in maturity, and reaches diameters of up to 8 cm (3 1/8 in). The gills on the underside of the cap are initially pinkish-buff before becoming pale brown when the spores mature. The stem is lavender, measuring 10–18 cm (4–7 in) long and 1–2 cm (3/8–3/4 in) thick. The mushroom produces a rusty-brown spore print, with individual spores measuring 12–14 by 7–8 μm.

The edibility of the species is unknown and it resembles poisonous mushrooms. It is known only from the Pacific Northwest region of North America, where it grows under conifers such as spruce, hemlock, and Douglas-fir.

== Taxonomy ==
The species was described in 1972 by mycologists Alexander H. Smith and James M. Trappe, based on specimens they found in Cascade Head in Tillamook County, Oregon, in October and November 1970. The species had also been called Cortinarius elatior, but that name refers to a European species. Within the genus Cortinarius, C. vanduzerensis is classified in the subgenus Myxacium. This subgenus includes species in which both the cap and stem are sticky as a result of a glutinous universal veil. Based on the nucleic acid sequence similarity in the internal transcribed spacer region, C. vanduzerensis is closely related to the European and North American C. mucifluus and the Costa Rican species C. costaricensis.

A common name for the species is the "pointed Cortinarius", while the specific epithet vanduzerensis refers to the H. B. van Duzer Forest where the species was originally collected.

== Description ==
Young fruit bodies of C. vanduzerensis are covered with a slimy universal veil; the slime layer persists on the cap of young mushrooms, or in moist weather. The shape of the cap is oval to conical with the margin initially appressed, expanding to broadly conic or somewhat flattened in maturity, eventually reaching diameters of 3.5–9 cm (1 1/2–3 1/2 in). The cap color is initially chestnut-brown to black, but becomes paler brown as it matures. The surface is radially wrinkled or corrugated, especially near the margin. The flesh is pallid but soon pale cinnamon-buff. The odor and taste are not distinctive. A drop of FeSO_{4} solution (a reagent commonly used in mushroom identification) applied to the surface of the cap will turn olive-green.

The gills are pinkish-buff when young (in unopened caps), dull cinnamon-brown at maturity when the spores mature. They are packed close together, and are adnate or adnexed. The stem is 7–20 cm (3–8 in) long, 1–2 cm (3/8–3/4 in) thick, narrowed slightly to the base. It is pallid within but slowly cinnamon buff at least near the base. The stem surface has a thick slime-veil, and is lavender to light purple on the upper portion, but darker on the lower portion. Sometimes the universal veil breaks up into concentric zones over the lower third of the stem.

The edibility of the mushroom is not known. David Arora notes that it is "much too slippery to be of value". It is also not recommended due to its similarity to deadly poisonous species.

The spore print is a rusty-brown color. In face view, the spores are broadly elliptic to ovate (egg-shaped), while in profile they appear broadly inequilateral; they have dimensions of 12–14 by 7–8 μm. The spore surface is roughened with warts, and they lack an apical pore. The spores contain two nuclei. The basidia (spore-bearing cells in the hymenium) are four-spored, broadly club-shaped, and have contents that are often in the form of yellow masses or granules when stained in Melzer's reagent. The cheilocystida (cystidia on the gill edge) are club-shaped, sometimes with an abruptly tapering point, and measure 17–26 by 9–15 μm. There are no pleurocystidia (cystidia on the gill face). The gill tissue is made of hyphae that are arranged in a roughly parallel fashion (subparallel); there are also brownish to orange-brown fat-containing hyphae present. The epicutis (outer layer of tissue) of the cap is made of a turf of gelatinous hyphae that measure 2.5–6 μm wide; clamp connections are absent to rare in the hyphae. The veil hyphae are 4–8 μm wide, and hyaline (translucent) to yellow when mounted in a dilute solution of KOH. The hyphae of the cortex of the stem are subparallel, and clamps are present.

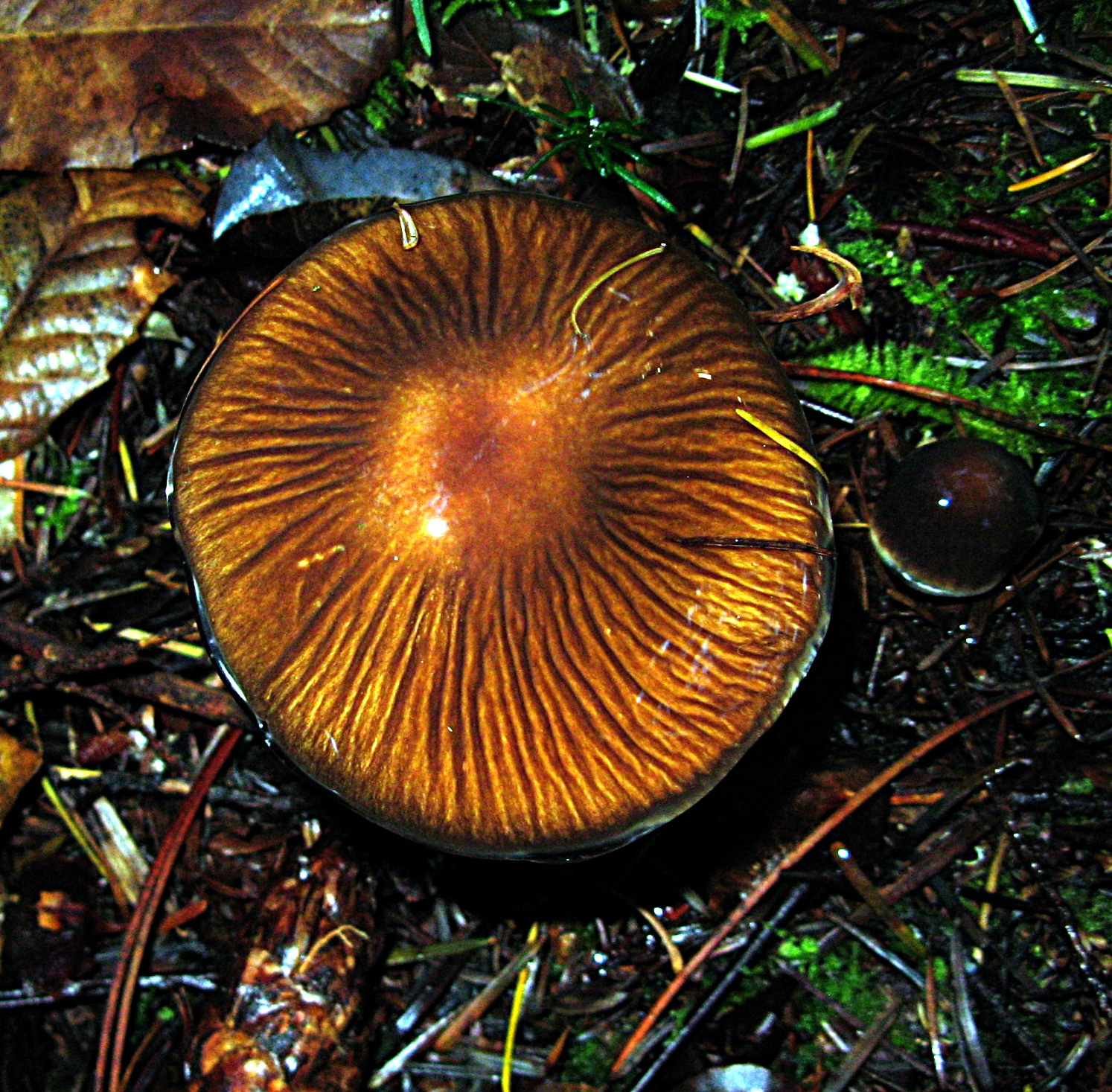
The cap develops deep radial grooves as it matures.

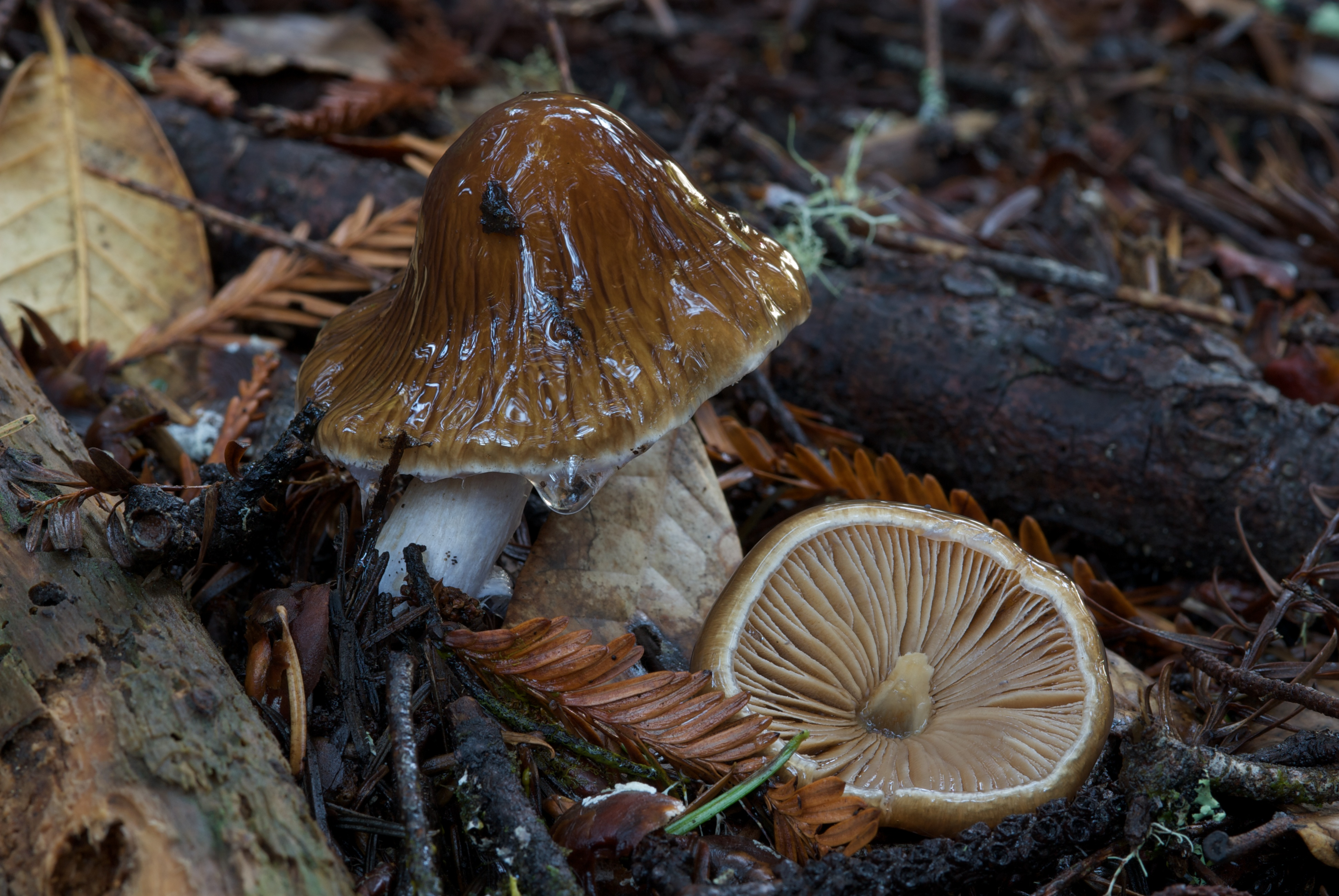
The gills are closely packed and dull cinnamon-brown at maturity.

=== Similar species ===
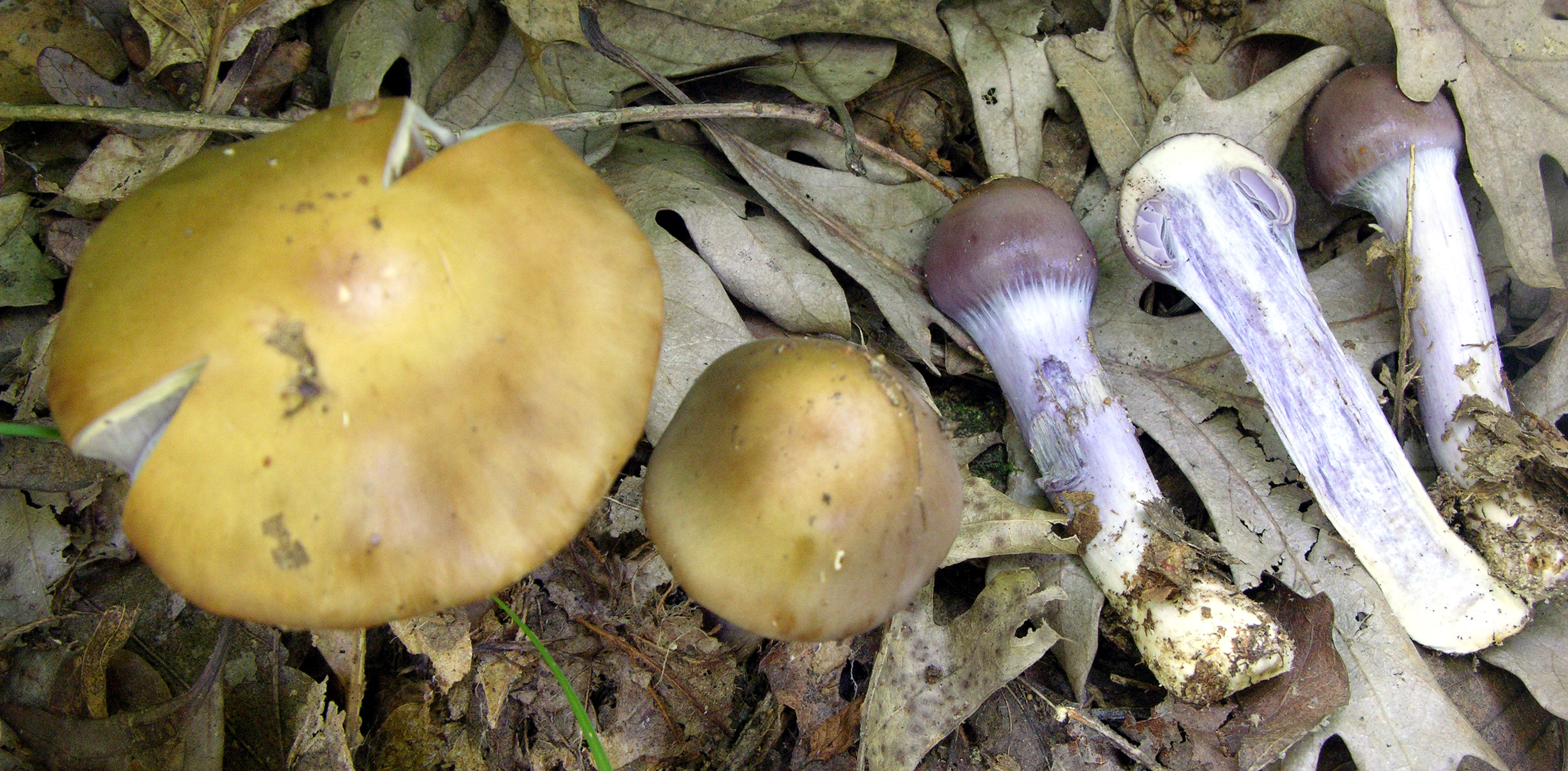
Cortinarius cylindripes

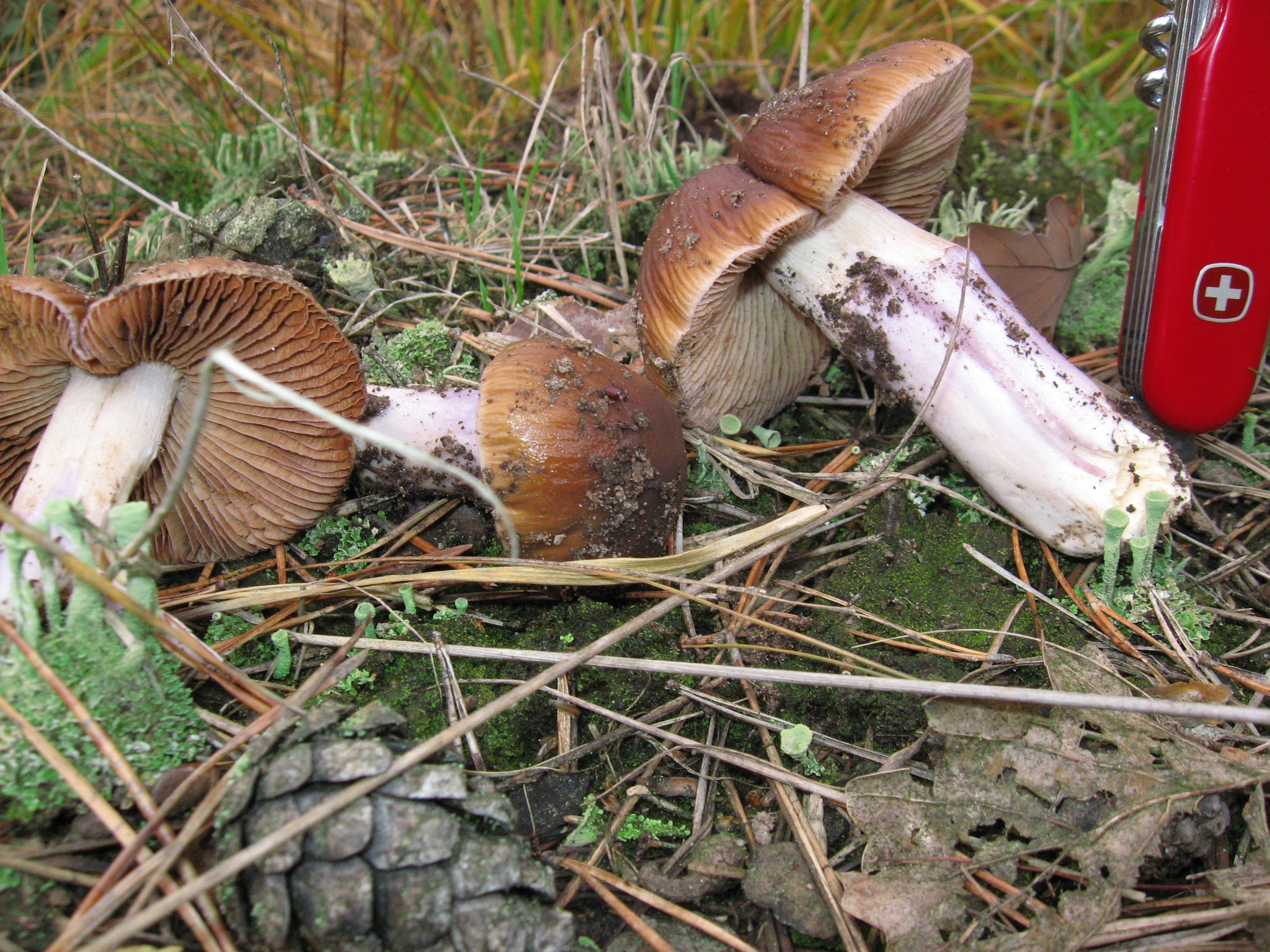
Cortinarius elatior

Smith and Trappe noted a similarity to the European Cortinarius elatior, but this species has violet gills at first. C. collinitis has a lighter brown slimy cap, with glutinous bands on the stem that are rarely tinged purple. A third species in this group, C. cylindripes has a lighter colored, sometimes wrinkled cap, and gills that are pale purple when young with fringed edges. C. stillatitius is a related European species found in coniferous (sometimes in mixed) forests. Another glutinous, dark-brown capped species with which C. vanduzerensis might be confused is Phaeocollybia spadicea, but this species has pseudorhiza (a subterranean elongation of the stem) at the stem base and gills that are free from attachment to the stem.

== Habitat and distribution ==
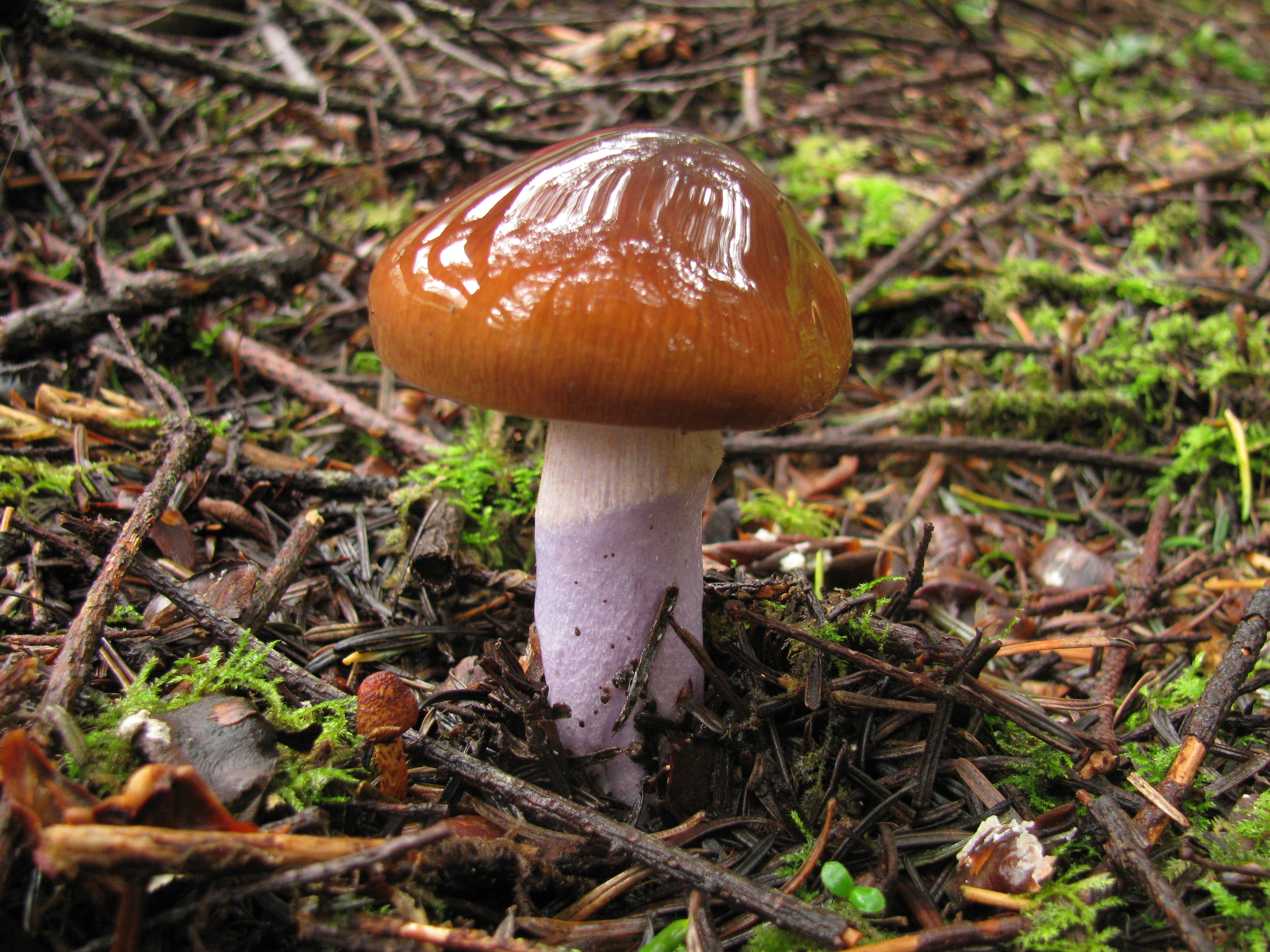
Specimen in Caspar, California

Cortinarius vanduzerensis is a mycorrhizal mushroom that grows in association with conifer trees. The fruit bodies grow solitarily, scattered, in rings or in groups under spruce, hemlock, and Douglas-fir. The mushroom is known only from the Pacific Northwest region of North America, including the Queen Charlotte Islands on the north Coast of British Columbia, Canada. It fruits in the autumn and early winter, or in the late summer in western Canada. Its frequency of occurrence has been described variously as "very common", to "fairly common", or "rare" everywhere except Oregon".
