= Smith River (Umpqua River tributary) =

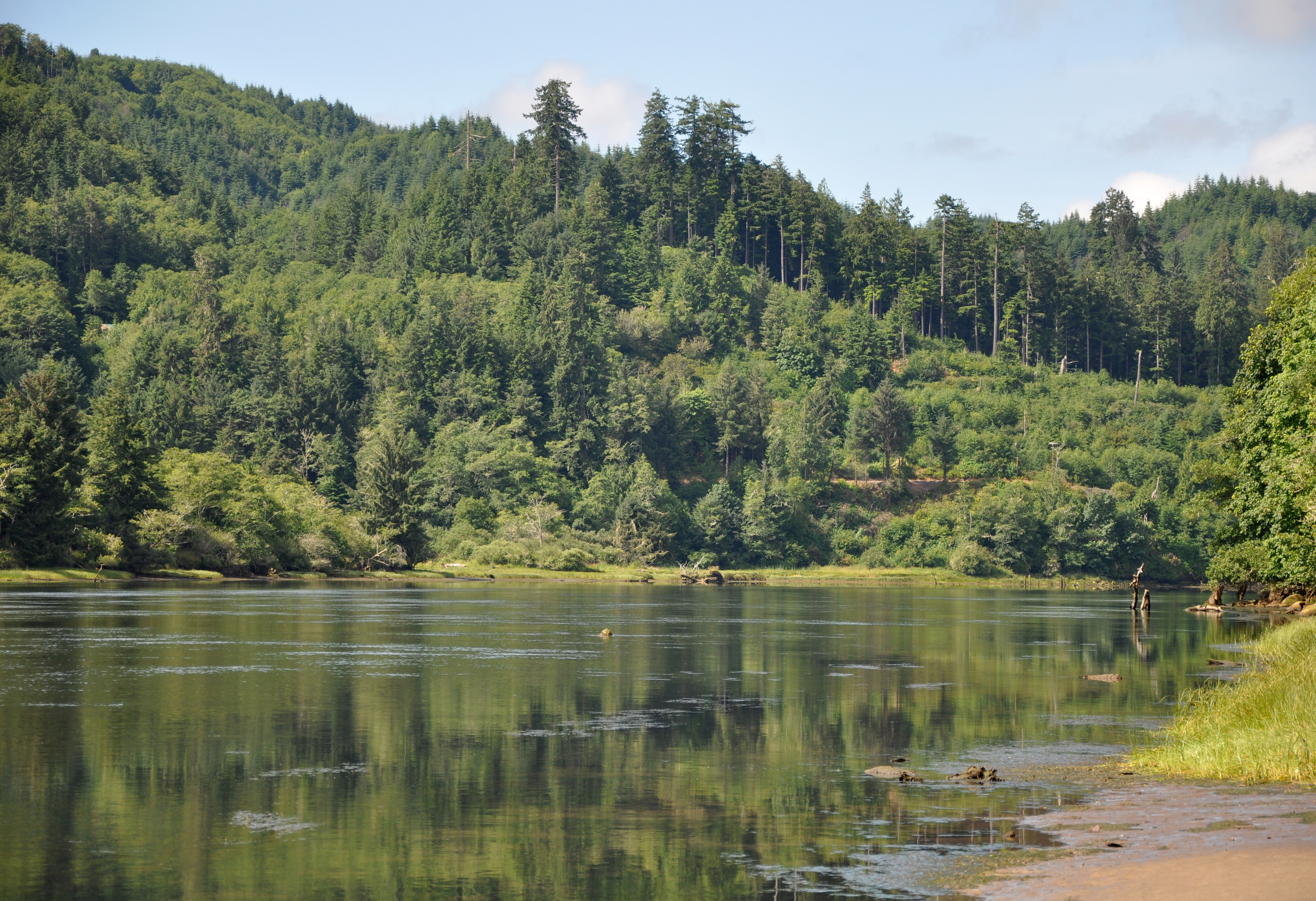
- Along Lower Smith River Road northeast of Reedsport

- Location of the mouth of the Smith River in Oregon
- Etymology: Jedediah Smith, early 19th century explorer

Location
- Country: United States
- State: Oregon
- County: Douglas County

Physical characteristics
- Source: Central Oregon Coast Range
  - location: north of Drain, Douglas County, Oregon
  - coordinates: 43°44′25″N 123°20′22″W
  - elevation: 1,407 ft (429 m)
- Mouth: Umpqua River
  - location: Reedsport, Douglas County, Oregon
  - coordinates: 43°44′13″N 124°04′43″W
  - elevation: 0 ft (0 m)
- Length: 91 mi (146 km)
- Basin size: 352 sq mi (910 km^{2})
- Discharge
  - average: 735 cu ft/s (20.8 m^{3}/s)

The Smith River is a 90-mile (140 km) tributary of the Umpqua River in the U.S. state of Oregon. It drains 352 square miles (910 km^{2}) of the Central Oregon Coast Range between the watershed of the Umpqua to the south and the Siuslaw River to the north.

Rising in northern Douglas County about 10 miles (16 km) north of Drain, the river flows generally west in a winding course through the mountains, passing through the Siuslaw National Forest for about 10 miles (16 km) in its lower course. It joins the Umpqua from the north across from Reedsport, about 6 miles (10 km) from the mouth of the Umpqua on the Pacific Ocean.

The river is named for Jedediah Smith, who in 1828 led a party of explorers from Utah overland to northern California and southern Oregon. From California, they traveled north to the Umpqua River, camping along its banks near the mouth of the Smith River on July 13. An attack by Native Americans on July 14 killed 15 of Smith's party. One man escaped by heading north to Tillamook and then Fort Vancouver. Smith and two others who were not in camp at the time of the attack fled east toward the Willamette Valley and survived. The Smith River in California is also named for Smith.

== Tributaries ==
Named tributaries of the Smith River from source to mouth are Spring, Whiskey, Alder, Watering Trough, Sleezer, Tip Davis, Peterson, Redford, and Hall creeks. Then Summit, Hefty, Plank, Clevenger, Beaver, Elk, and Arthur Jones creeks. Next is the South Fork Smith River followed by Salmonberry, Amberson, Panther, Haney, Huckleberry, Deer, Yellow, and Hardenbrook creeks.

Next, continuing downstream, are Cleghorn, Johnson, Slideout, Clabber, Halfway, Mosetown, Blind, Rock, Marsh, Devils Club, South Sister and North Sister creeks. Then Beaver, Carpenter, Coldwater, Clearwater, Blackwell, and Scare creeks. Next is the West Fork Smith River followed by Vincent, Rachel, Johnson, Bear, Little Buck, and Buck creeks.

Then come Fawn, Doe, Dailey, Spencer, Taylor, Wasson, and Murphy creeks. Next is the North Fork Smith River followed by Russian John Gulch, then Eslick, Noel, Cassidy, Joyce, Black, and Brainard creeks. Below that are Otter Slough, Camp Seven Gulch, Hudson Slough, Frantz Creek, and Butler Creek.

== Gallery ==
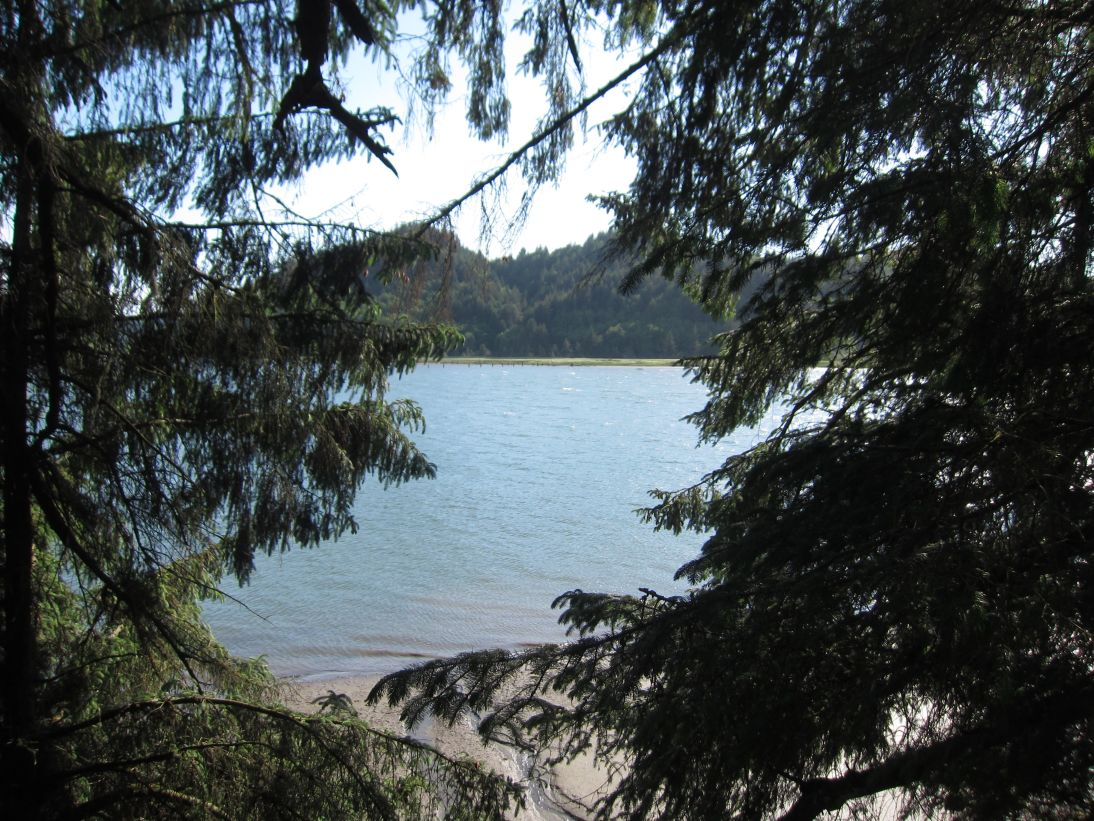
Smith River north of Reedsport

Bridge over Smith River, near Reedsport

== See also ==
- List of rivers of Oregon
- List of longest streams of Oregon

== Works cited ==
- McArthur, Lewis A., and McArthur, Lewis L. (2003) [1928]. Oregon Geographic Names, 7th ed. Portland: Oregon Historical Society Press. ISBN 0-87595-277-1.
