= Drift Creek Bridge =

Covered bridge in Oregon, US

- Formerly listed on the U.S. National Register of Historic Places
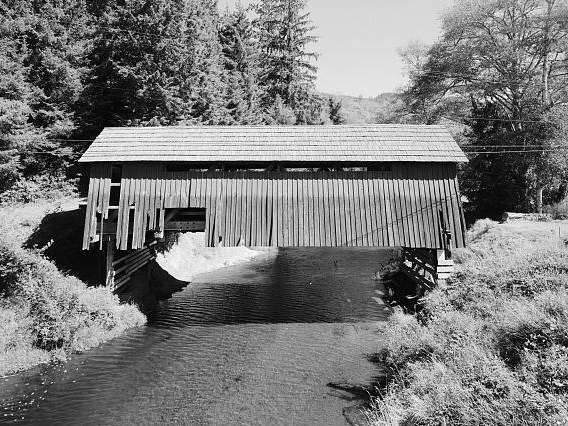
- Original Drift Creek Bridge over Drift Creek near Lincoln City. Photo by James B. Norman for the Historic American Engineering Record.

- Location within Oregon Location within the United States
- Coordinates: 44°59′35.1″N 123°53′11.2″W
- Built: 1914 (2000)
- Architectural style: Howe truss
- NRHP reference No.: 79002106

Significant dates
- Listed: November 29, 1979
- Removed from NRHP: July 21, 1998

The Drift Creek Bridge is a covered bridge in Lincoln County in the U.S. state of Oregon. Built in 1914, the structure originally carried Drift Creek County Road over Drift Creek. The creek flows into Siletz Bay of the Pacific Ocean south of Lincoln City.

The original bridge, about 1.5 miles (2.4 km) from the ocean, once carried the main north–south route along the coast. Newer bridges later carried most of the north–south traffic and, after a concrete bridge bypassed the Drift Creek Bridge in the 1960s, Lincoln County preserved it as a pedestrian crossing and a monument to 19th-century pioneers. In 1988, however, county officials closed the bridge entirely after rot and insect damage made the structure unsafe.

The county dismantled the bridge in 1997 and gave the timbers to Laura and Kerry Sweitz, who owned land 8 miles (13 km) north of the Drift Creek site. In 2000, the Sweitz family rebuilt the bridge over Bear Creek and granted a permanent public easement at that site. Bear Creek is a tributary of the Salmon River, which it enters near Rose Lodge.

The original Howe truss bridge had board-and-batten siding, arched portals, and ribbon windows along the eaves. Before being dismantled, it was the closest covered bridge to the Oregon Coast. The bridge was added to the National Register of Historic Places in 1979 and removed in 1998.

== See also ==
- List of bridges documented by the Historic American Engineering Record in Oregon
- List of bridges on the National Register of Historic Places in Oregon
- List of Oregon covered bridges
