= Grass Mountain =

Grass Mountain may refer to:

- Grass Mountain (Vermont) (948 m), a mountain in Vermont, USA
- Grass Mountain (Benton County, Oregon) (1,099 m), a mountain in Oregon, USA
- Grass Mountain Chateau, a former presidential residence in China

== See also ==
- grass mountain
