= Drift Creek Falls =

- Interactive map of Drift Creek Falls
- Location: Drift Creek Wilderness
- Coordinates: 44.93338°N 123.85062°W
- Type: Veiling Horsetail
- Elevation: 608 ft (185 m)
- Total height: 66 ft (20 m)
- Total width: 8 ft (2 m)

Drift Creek Falls is a waterfall formed west of Valley of the Giants, east side of the city of Lincoln City in Lincoln County, Oregon. Access to Drift Creek Falls is located along a trail constructed by the Forest Service in the 1990s and features a 240 foot long suspension bridge crossing Drift Creek.

== Trail ==
The trail to Drift Creek Falls is approximately 2.6 miles out and back through the Central Oregon Coast Range forest of Drift Creek Wilderness. The trailhead is approximately 10 miles into Forest Service Road 17, which is east of Drift Creek Road, and Highway 101, south of Lincoln City.

The trail has one split towards a less maintained uphill trail that ends in the same spot providing more elevation gain than the main trail.

== Bridge ==
The trail to Drift Creek Falls crosses a suspension bridge anchored by cables and ties that are cemented into opposing bluff ridges. The bridge spans the width of the canyon through which Drift Creek runs and marks the end of the Drift Creek Falls trail. The walkway surface is 3 feet wide and hangs approximately 100 feet above the creek. Access beyond the bridge is by an improvised, poorly maintained path down to the base of the waterfall.

== See also ==
- List of waterfalls in Oregon
