= Beazell Memorial Forest =

Forest in Oregon, United States

Coordinates: 44.650°N 123.416°W

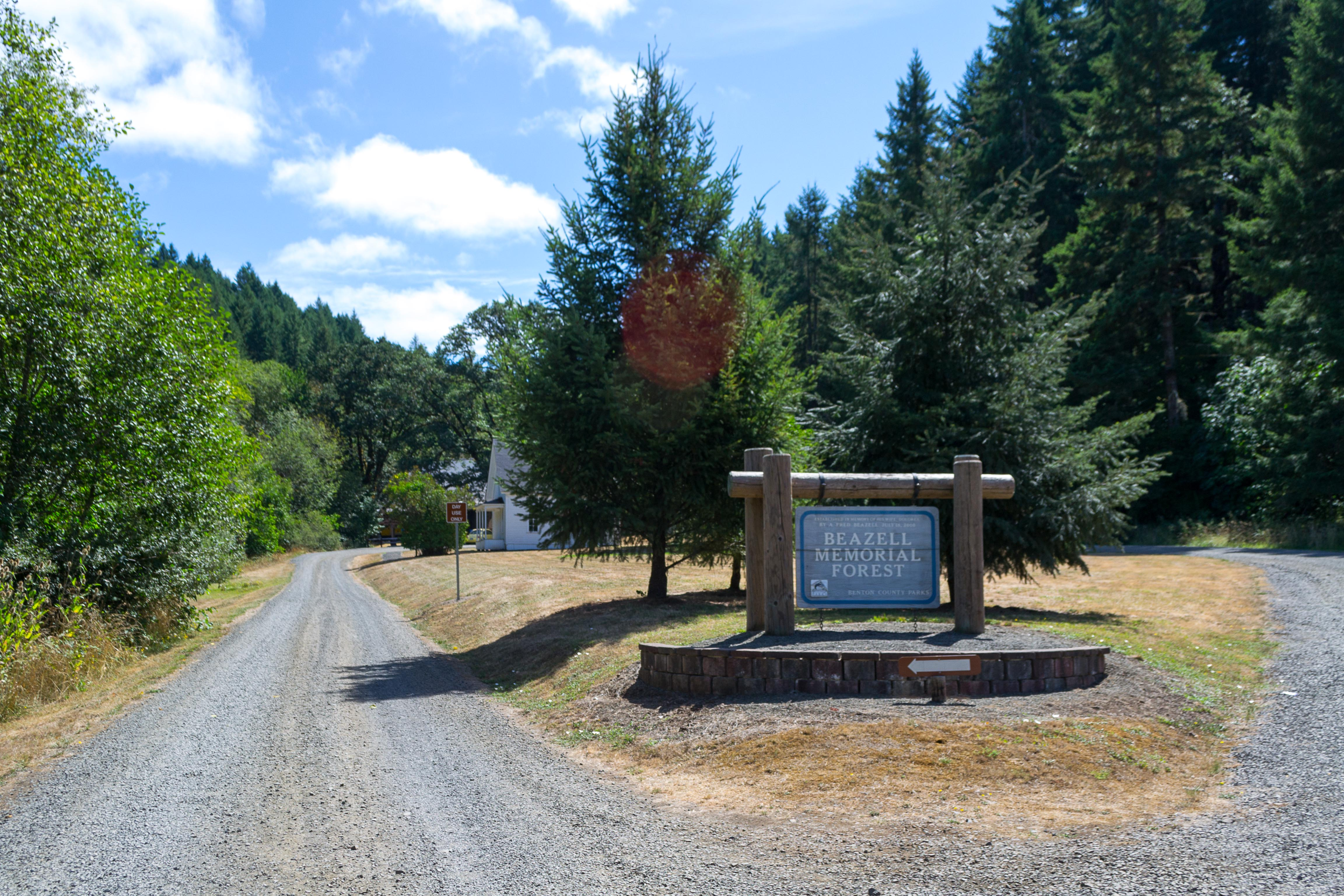
Entrance to the Beazell Memorial Forest

Beazell Memorial Forest is a preserve of temperate rainforest ten miles (16 km) west of Corvallis, Oregon, United States in the Central Oregon Coast Range. The forest was donated to Benton County by Fred Beazell in 2000.

== Geography ==
A mixed forest, Beazell covers 586 acres (2.37 km^{2}). It has a trail and a dirt road that form a loop around the forest together. The forest gets enough rain to almost be a temperate rainforest, as it's on a western slope.

It is the largest park maintained by Benton County.

== See also ==
- Benton County, Oregon
- Corvallis, Oregon
