= Beaver Creek Falls =

Waterfall in Oregon, United States

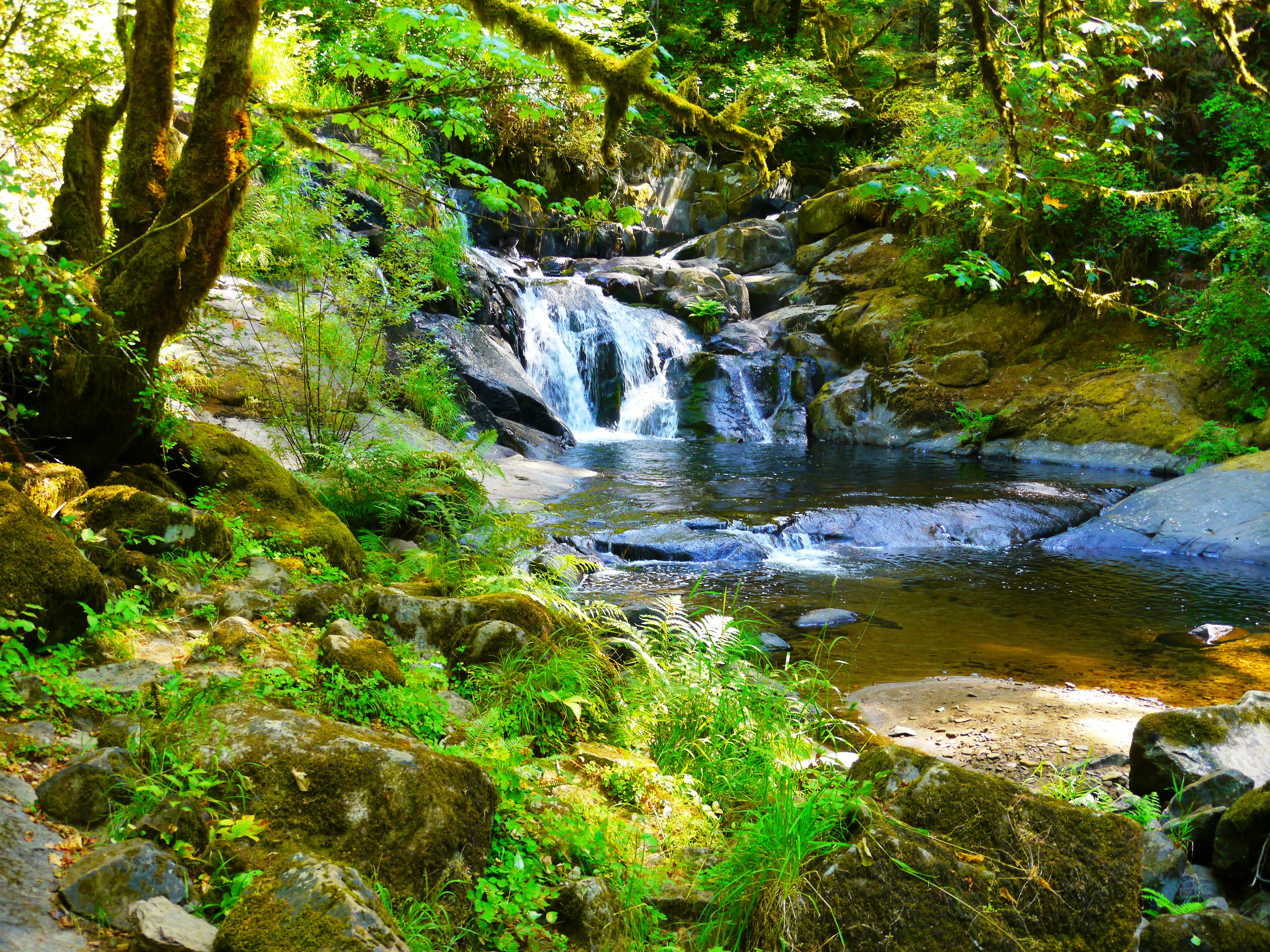
- Interactive map of Beaver Creek Falls
- Location: Siuslaw National Forest
- Coordinates: 43.94226°N 123.89208°W
- Type: Segmented Steep Cascade
- Elevation: 617 ft (188 m)
- Total height: 20 ft (6.1 m)
- Average flow rate: 150 cu ft/s (4.2 m^{3}/s)

Beaver Creek Falls is a small waterfall located at the confluence of Beaver and Sweet Creeks in Lane County, in the U.S. state of Oregon. The waterfall is known for joining of the two creeks becoming one intertwined waterfall.

== Location ==
Beaver Creek Falls is located approximately 12 miles off of Highway 126, south of Mapleton. It totals 20 feet fall in a wide cascade and is the centerpiece attraction of the Beaver Creek Falls Trail trailhead and Recreation Site.

== See also ==
- List of waterfalls in Oregon
