= Salmon River (Lincoln County, Oregon) =

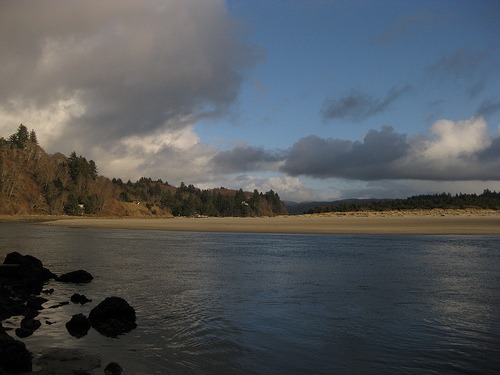
- Near mouth on the Pacific Ocean

- Location of the mouth of the Salmon River in Oregon
- Etymology: salmon, the fish

Location
- Country: United States
- State: Oregon
- County: Lincoln, Tillamook, and Polk

Physical characteristics
- Source: Saddlebag Mountain
  - location: Central Oregon Coast Range, Lincoln County
  - coordinates: 44°59′42″N 123°46′35″W
  - elevation: 3,050 ft (930 m)
- Mouth: Pacific Ocean
  - location: near Cascade Head
  - coordinates: 45°02′48″N 124°00′22″W
  - elevation: 0 ft (0 m)
- Length: 24 mi (39 km)
- Basin size: 75 sq mi (190 km^{2})
- Discharge
  - average: 339 cu ft/s (9.6 m^{3}/s)

The Salmon River flows from the Central Oregon Coast Range to the Pacific Ocean coast of northwest Oregon in the United States. About 24 miles (39 km) long, it begins and ends in Lincoln County but also flows briefly through western Polk and southern Tillamook counties. Much of its course lies within the Siuslaw National Forest.

Rising in the mountains near the Lincoln–Polk county line, it flows east into Polk County, then north and west, re-entering Lincoln County, entering Tillamook County and re-entering Lincoln County near Oregon Route 18. It continues generally west-southwestward through the Siuslaw National Forest, turning west again to enter the Pacific near Cascade Head, about 4 miles (6 km) north of Lincoln City.

Following the river through the mountains, Route 18 connects to Sheridan, McMinnville and the South Yamhill River valley to the east and U.S. Route 101 to the west. The river and highway pass through the Van Duzer Forest Corridor State Wayside. The river supports populations of wild steelhead and coastal cutthroat trout, as well as chinook and coho salmon released each year from a hatchery at Otis.

== Tributaries ==
Named tributaries from source to mouth are the Little Salmon River, which enters from the right; Boulder Creek, left; Indian, Prairie, and Sulphur creeks, right; Deer Creek, left; Treat River, left; Alder Brook, right; Widow Creek, right.

Then Slick Rock and Bear creeks, left; Panther Creek, right; Willis Creek, left; Deer and Salmon creeks, right; Frazer and Rowdy creeks, left, and Crowley and Teal creeks, right.

== See also ==
- List of rivers of Oregon

== Works cited ==
- McArthur, Lewis A., and McArthur, Lewis L. (2003) [1928]. Oregon Geographic Names, 7th ed. Portland: Oregon Historical Society Press. ISBN 0-87595-277-1.
- Sheehan, Madelynne Diness (2005). Fishing in Oregon: The Complete Oregon Fishing Guide, 10th ed. Scappoose, Oregon: Flying Pencil Publications. ISBN 0-916473-15-5.
