= Grass Mountain (Benton County, Oregon) =

Mountain in Oregon, United States

- Location within Oregon Location within the United States

Highest point
- Elevation: 3,607 ft (1,099 m) NAVD 88
- Prominence: 2,163 ft (659 m)
- Coordinates: 44°25′26″N 123°40′22″W

Geography
- Location: Benton County, Oregon, U.S.
- Parent range: Central Oregon Coast Range; Oregon Coast Range
- Topo map: USGS Grass Mountain

Grass Mountain is a 3,607-foot (1,099 m) tall mountain in the Central Oregon Coast Range in the U.S. state of Oregon. Located in Benton County, it is the second highest peak in the Central Coast Range.

The Oregon Department of Forestry built 40-foot (12 m) lookout tower on the summit in 1935. It was decommissioned and dismantled in 1968.

== See also ==
- Hayden Bridge
