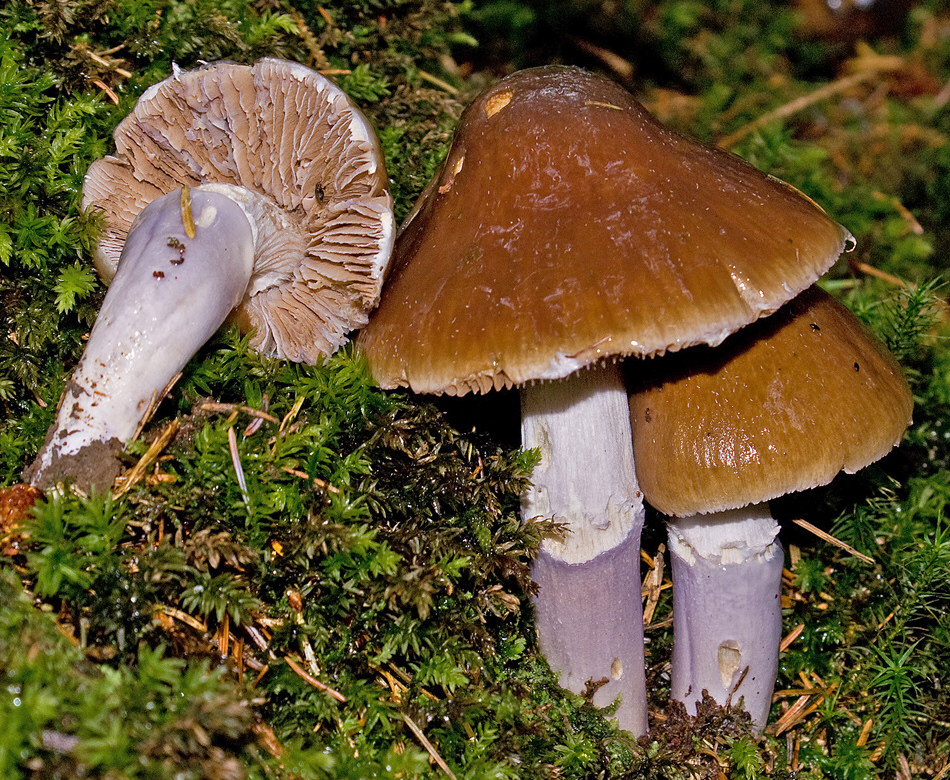

Scientific classification
- Kingdom: Fungi
- Division: Basidiomycota
- Class: Agaricomycetes
- Order: Agaricales
- Family: Cortinariaceae
- Genus: Cortinarius
- Species: C. elatior

Binomial name
- Cortinarius elatior Fr. (1801)

Synonyms
- Agaricus elatus Pers.

= Cortinarius elatior =

Species of fungus

Cortinarius elatior
- Mycological characteristics
- Gills on hymenium
- Cap is conical or umbonate
- Hymenium is adnate
- Stipe has a cortina
- Spore print is reddish-brown
- Ecology is mycorrhizal
- Edibility is unknown

Cortinarius elatior is a species of mushroom native to Europe which is commonly known as the wrinkled webcap due to the cap's tendency to wrinkle with age.

== Description ==
Cortinarius elatior is a large webcap mushroom with white flesh.

Cap: 5-11cm. Starts conical before flattening with an umbo. The cap may become sticky and slimy when wet and lined when older usually with white veil remnants on the edges. Stem: 5-8cm. Tapers down to the base such that it has a pointed appearance which is wider at the top. Partial veil is pale violet to blue in colour forming and indistinct ring zone. Gills: Cream turning reddish-brown with age. Spacing is distant and attachment to the stipe is adnate. Spore print: Reddish-brown. Spores: Almond to lemon shaped with warts. 11-15 x 7.5-9 μm. Taste: Indistinct. Smell: Sweet like honey but not pleasant.

== See also ==
- List of Cortinarius species
