= H. B. Van Duzer Forest State Scenic Corridor =

Scenic route in Oregon, United States

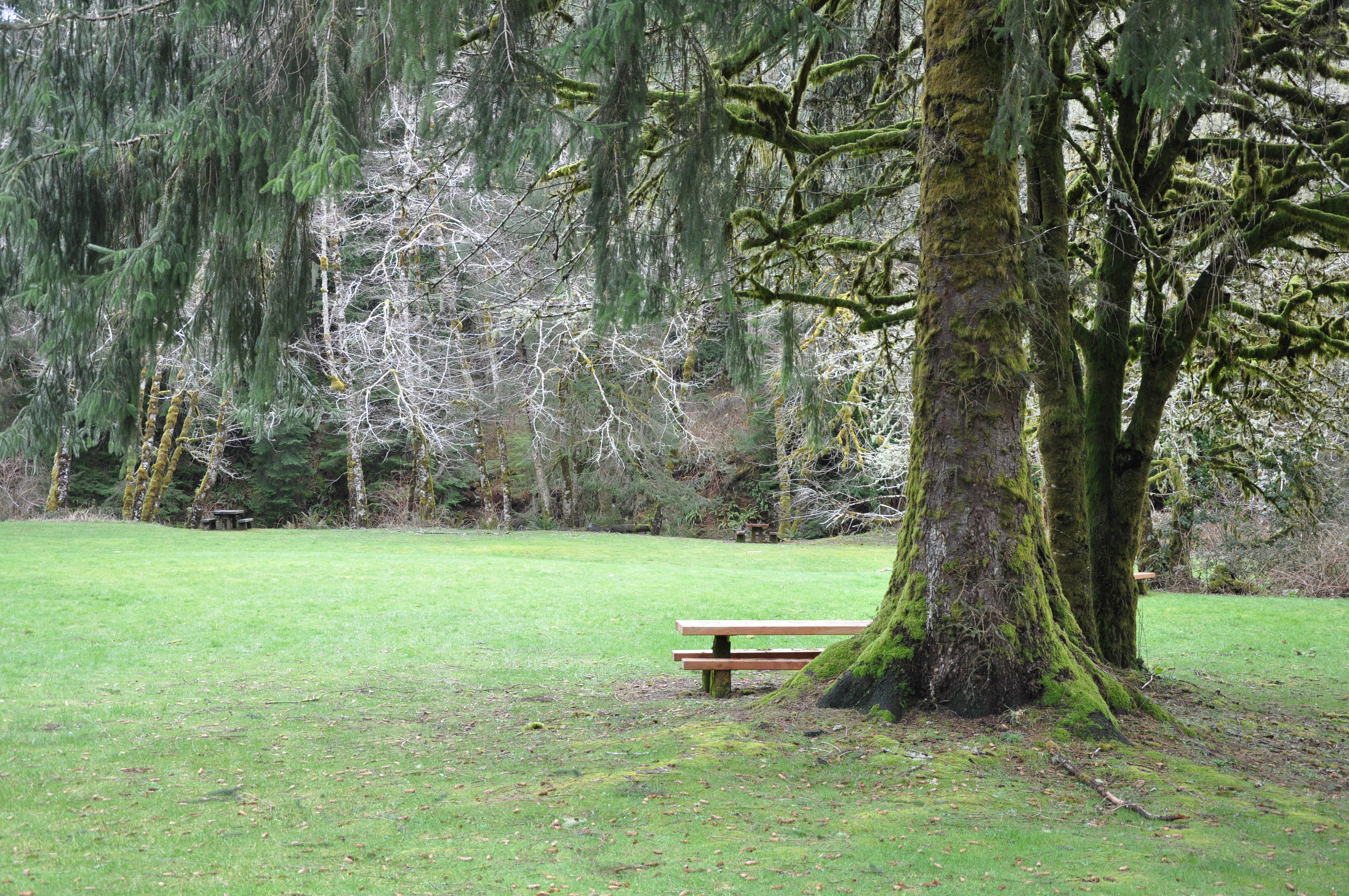
- Rest stop in the Van Duzer Corridor

- Location within Oregon Location within the United States
- Type: Public, state
- Location: Lincoln, Polk, and Tillamook counties, Oregon, U.S.
- Nearest city: Lincoln City
- Coordinates: 45°02′39″N 123°48′09″W
- Operator: Oregon Parks and Recreation Department

H. B. Van Duzer Forest State Scenic Corridor is a 12-mile (19 km) scenic driving route along Route 18 in Lincoln, Tillamook, and Polk counties in the U.S. state of Oregon that passes through a forested corridor. The Van Duzer Corridor stretches from northwestern Polk County to Lincoln City, passing through the Northern Oregon Coast Range.

The forest corridor was named for Henry B. Van Duzer, a member of the Oregon State Highway Commission and president of the Inman Poulson Logging Company, who was appointed by Governor I. L. Patterson as the first chairman of the Oregon State Parks Commission in 1929. The land, purchased by the State of Oregon between 1935 and 1942, is managed by the Oregon Parks and Recreation Department, which also maintains a scenic rest stop on the route.

An old growth Douglas-fir forest is located along the Salmon River. Roosevelt elk can be seen along the route.

== See also ==
- Little Nestucca River
- South Yamhill River
