= Central Oregon Coast Range =

Mountain range in Oregon, United States

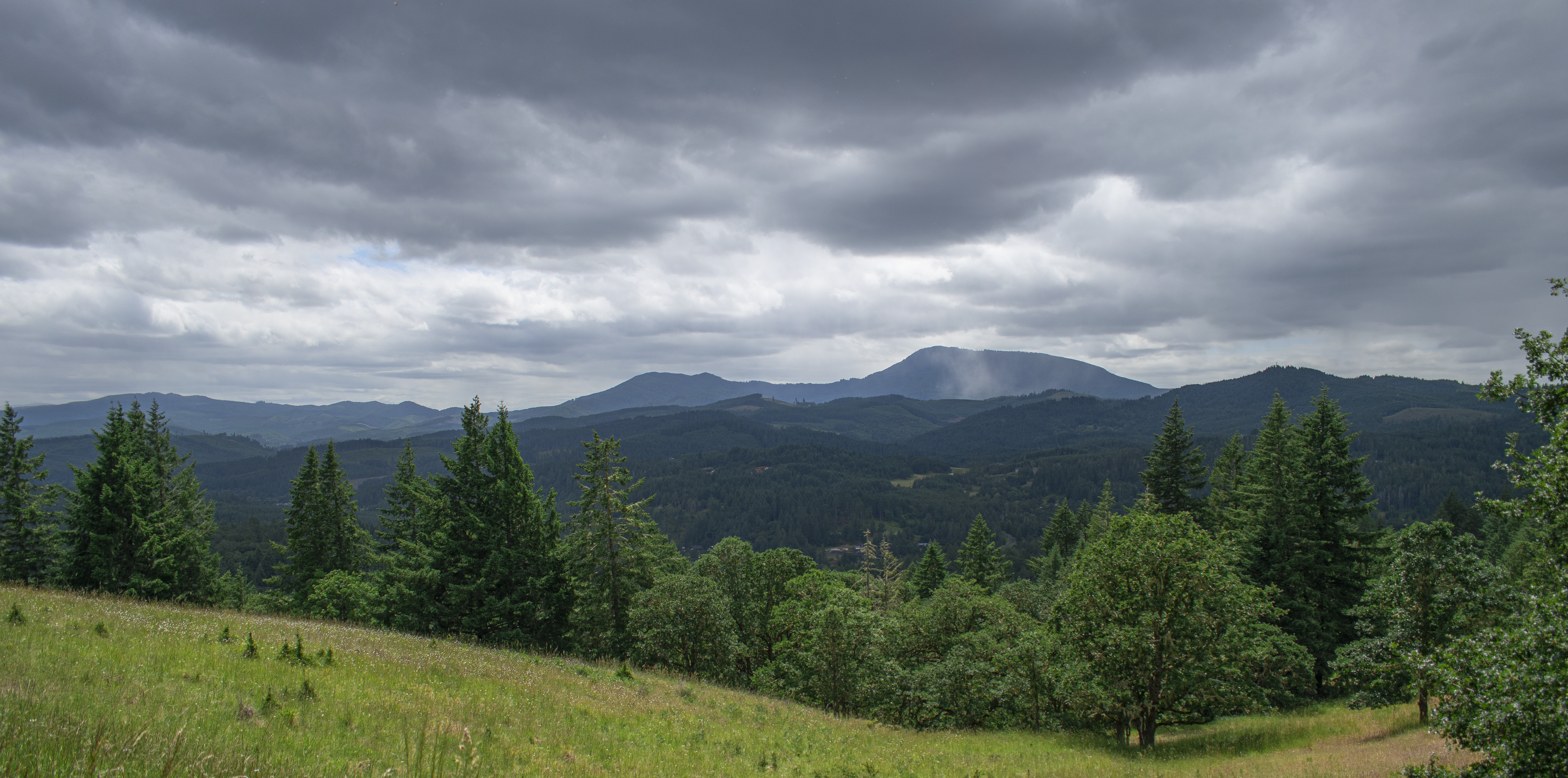
- The range from west of Corvallis

Highest point
- Peak: Marys Peak
- Elevation: 4,097 ft (1,249 m)
- Coordinates: 44°30′16″N 123°33′09″W

Dimensions
- Length: 90 mi (140 km) North–South

Geography
- Location within Oregon
- Country: United States
- State: Oregon
- Range coordinates: 44°36′00″N 123°34′00″W
- Parent range: Oregon Coast Range, Pacific Coast Ranges
- Borders on: Northern Oregon Coast Range and Southern Oregon Coast Range

Geology
- Rock ages: Paleocene and Eocene
- Rock types: volcanic and forearc basin

The Central Oregon Coast Range is the middle section of the Oregon Coast Range, in the Pacific Coast Ranges physiographic region, and located in the west-central portion of the state of Oregon, United States roughly between the Salmon River and the Umpqua River and the Willamette Valley and the Pacific Ocean. This approximately 90-mile (140 km) long mountain range contains mountains as high as 4,097 feet (1,249 m) for Marys Peak. Portions of the range are inside the Siuslaw National Forest and three wilderness areas exist as well: Drift Creek Wilderness, Cummins Creek Wilderness and Rock Creek Wilderness.

== Geology ==
The underlying rock of the Central Coast Range are the igneous rocks from the Siletz River Volcanics of the Paleocene age. It is estimated that this rock formation is up to 16 miles (26 km) thick. These formations consist mainly of pillow basalt, large lava flows, tuff breccia, and sills. This part of the mountains are approximately 50 to 60 million years old. It is theorized that the source of these lava flows came from oceanic islands that formed over a tectonic hotspot. The entire Oregon Coast Range overlies a convergent tectonic margin that interacts with the Juan de Fuca Plate that is being sub-ducted beneath the North America tectonic plate. This is the Cascadia subduction zone that has experienced uplift for several million years. Currently it is part of a large forearc basin that extends for much of the entire Coast Range on a north–south alignment. Parts of the upper portions of the range contain continental margin deposits from the early Eocene to Paleocene age. Portions of this include marine fossils in the geologic record. Sandstone and shale are also present in the sections of the mountains, with thickness up to 7,875 ft (2,400 m). In the southern part of the range the bedrock is overlaid by Eocene age turbidite sediments and river sediment. The active tectonic forces have created many faults and folds in the range. Additionally, erosion is a major landscape-shaping force for the range. Both heavy rainfall and the resulting landslides have worked to erode and shape the mountains. Much of the landscape is dominated by steep slopes and drainages that are deeply cut into the hillsides from the erosion. Unlike many areas in North America, the mountain range did not see glaciations during the Pleistocene age.

== Flora and fauna ==
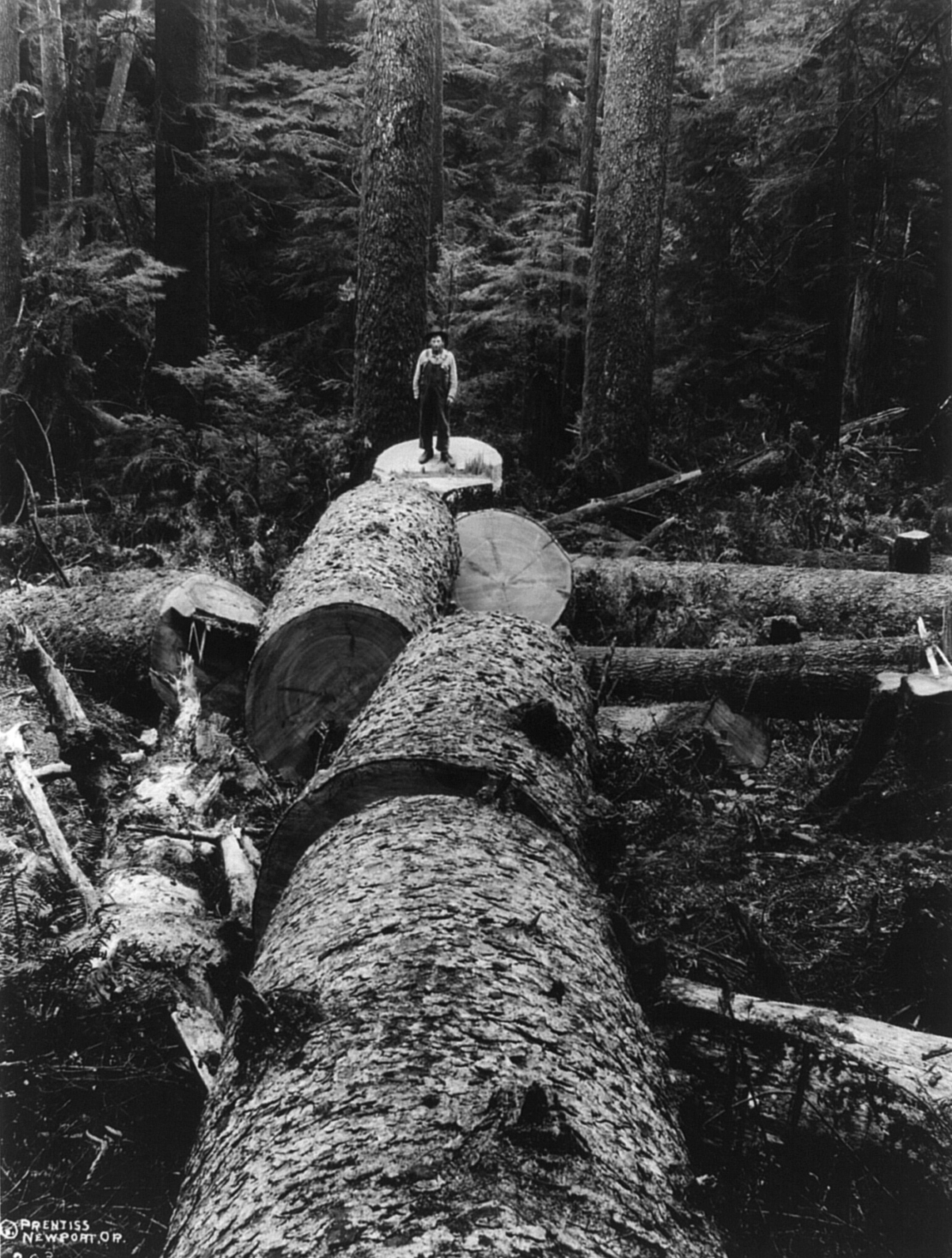
A Sitka spruce tree logged near Newport in 1918.

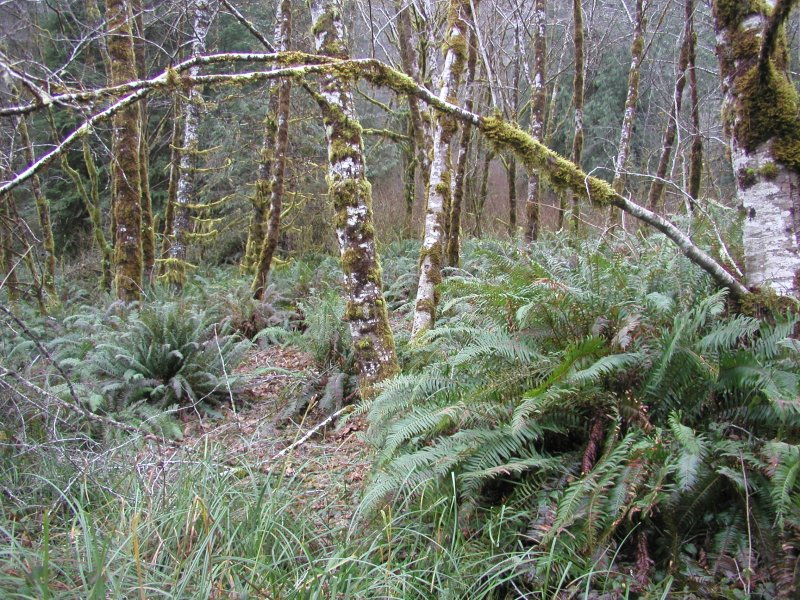
Red alder and sword fern in the Central Coast Range.

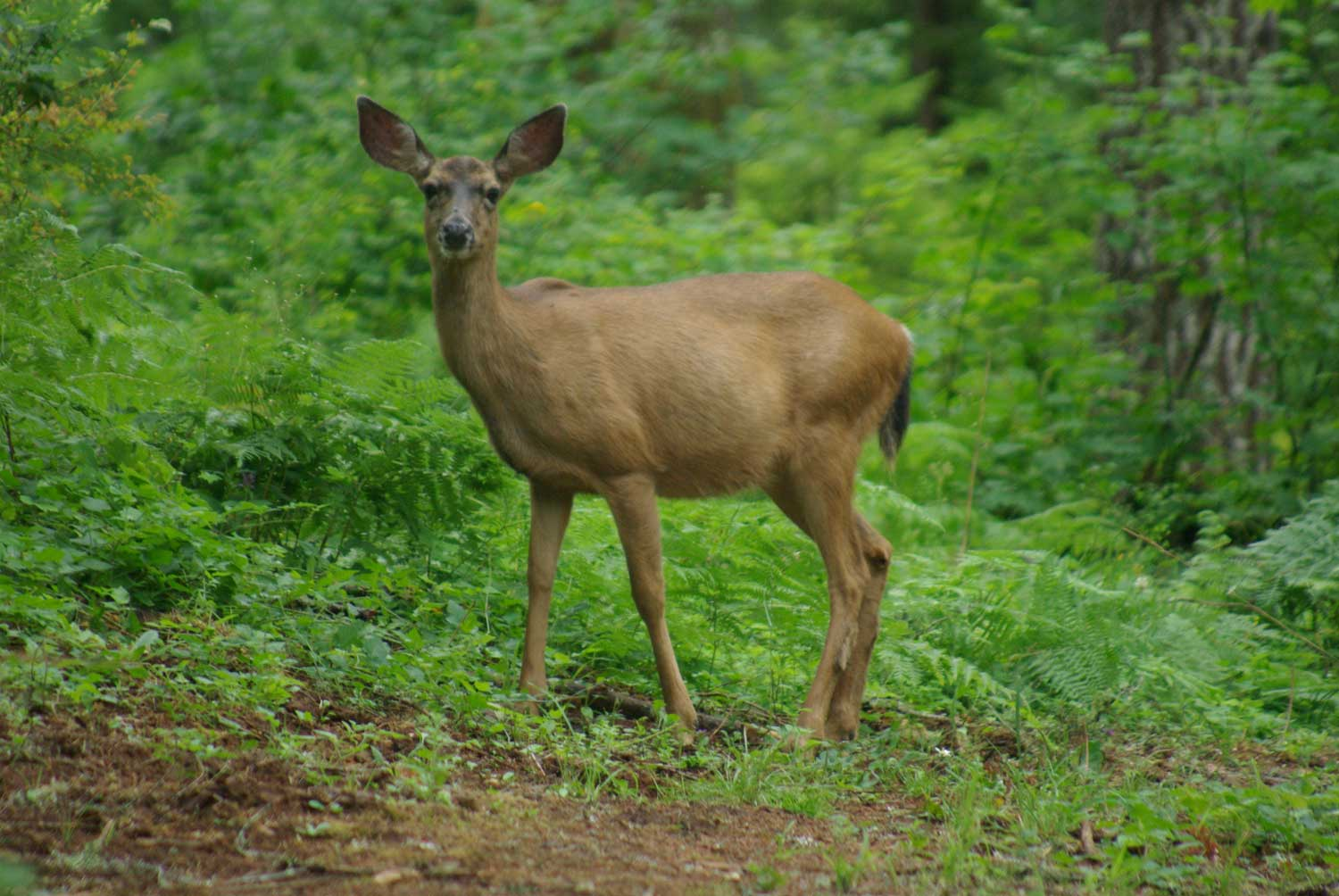
A black-tailed deer.

The Oregon Coast Range is home to over 50 mammals, 100 species of birds, and nearly 30 reptiles or amphibians that spent a significant portion of their life cycle in the mountains.

Birds living in the Central Coast Range include a variety of smaller and larger bird species. These include winter wrens, chestnut-backed chickadees, red-breasted nuthatches, varied thrushes, several swallow species, red crossbills, evening grosbeaks, brown creepers, olive-sided flycatchers, Hammond's flycatchers, gray jays, western wood-pewees, and western tanagers. Some of the larger species in the range include the red-breasted sapsucker, common ravens, peregrine falcons, the pileated woodpecker, turkey vultures, wood duck, common nighthawks, and the red-tailed hawk. Birds in lower numbers include Vaux's swifts, the endangered spotted owl, bald eagles, the downy woodpecker, hairy woodpeckers, the pine siskin, the hermit warbler, Pacific-slope flycatchers, golden-crowned kinglets, and ruffed grouse. One of the more common avian wildlife is the American dipper, which live mainly near rivers and streams. These birds build nests from six to nine inches (150 to 230 mm) in diameter out of moss.

The central coast range is also home to some larger animals such as deer, elk, bobcat, and bear. Bear are black bear while deer are mule and black-tailed deer species. Some additional mammals are mountain beaver, coyote, mink, river otter, mountain lion, the common raccoon, common porcupine, brush rabbit, and skunk.

The coast range is inhabited by eleven different species of bats, and they account for nearly 20% of all the mammal species in the range. Species of bats include the Yuma myotis, silver-haired bat, big brown bat, hoary bat, and the long-eared myotis. Other mammals living in the central range include beavers, creeping voles, long-tailed voles, vagrant shrews, deer mice, Pacific jumping mice, western pocket gopher, marsh shrew, shrew-mole, coast-mole, ermine, northern flying squirrel, and Townsend's chipmunk among others.

Amphibians include, but are not limited to, rough-skinned newts, northwestern salamanders, western red-backed salamander, Coastal tailed frog, Coastal giant salamander, red-legged frog, southern torrent salamander, and Ensatina. Additional species include northwestern garter snake, northern alligator lizard, Pacific tree frog, western pond turtles, gopher snake, ringneck snake, and western fence lizards. Fish species in the Central Coast Range include chinook salmon, steelhead, cutthroat trout, and the threatened species coho salmon.

A large section of the range is covered by the Siuslaw National Forest. Most of the range is forested and mainly within the western hemlock vegetation zone with the overstory of the forest dominated by red alder, western hemlock, western cedar, bigleaf maple, and Douglas-fir trees. In these forested sections, trees include Sitka spruce, western redcedar, Douglas-fir, and western hemlock. The understory of the forest areas contain vine maple, Oregon grape, salmonberry, huckleberry, and sword fern to name a few. Other plants that grow in the region are Pacific madrone, salmonberry, Pacific silver fir, bracken fern, manzanita, thimble-berry, Pacific dogwood, bitter cherry, snowberry, some rose species, and cascara. Additionally, various grass, sedge, and moss species are some of the other plant life growing in the mountain range.

Arthropods include various spiders, millipedes, collembolans, beetles, and a variety of centipedes.

== Location and climate ==
The range begins around the Salmon River with the Northern Oregon Coast Range to the north. Oregon Route 18 is the general divide between the two sections. On the southern end the Umpqua River and Oregon Route 38 provide the general dividing line between the Central and Southern Oregon Coast Range.

The climate of the mountains is of the mild maritime variety. It is characterized by cool dry summers followed by mild and wet winters. Most precipitation falls in the form of rain, with snow during the winter months at the higher elevations. Annual precipitation varies from 60 to 120 inches (150 to 300 centimetres), with more in the higher elevations. The average high temperature in January is 36.3 °F (2.4 °C), and the average high in July is 61.9 °F (16.6 °C) with temperature also varying by elevation.

== Peaks ==
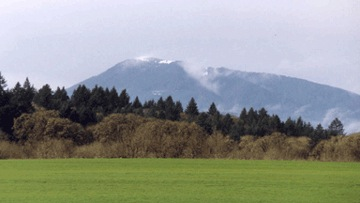
Snow-covered Marys Peak.

All peaks in the range over 3,000 feet (910 m) in elevation.

Mountain name	Elevation		County
	feet	metres	
Marys Peak	4,097	1,249	Benton
Grass Mountain	3,563	1,086	Benton
Laurel Mountain	3,553	1,083	Polk
Prairie Peak	3,412	1,040	Benton
Saddle Bag Mountain	3,386	1,032	Lincoln
Fanno Peak	3,317	1,011	Polk
Riley Peak	3,294	1,004	Polk
Old Blue Mountain	3,291	1,003	Benton
Prairie Mountain	3,287	1,002	Benton
Bald Mountain	3,215	980	Polk
Condenser Peak	3,058	932	Polk

== Rivers ==
The following rivers have portions of their headwaters in the Central Oregon Coast Range:

Drains to Willamette River:

- Long Tom River
- Luckiamute River
- Marys River

Drains to Pacific Ocean:

- Alsea River
- D River
- Little Nestucca River
- Salmon River
- Siletz River
- Siltcoos River
- Siuslaw River
- Smith River
- Umpqua River
- Yachats River
- Yaquina River

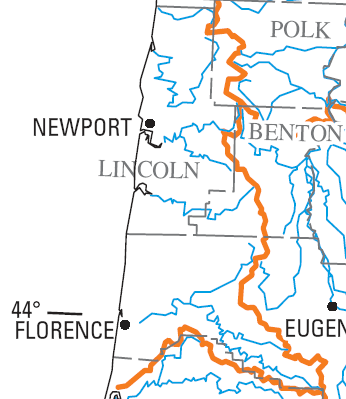
Map of the region with major rivers in blue. Orange line shows divide between watersheds flowing to the east and those flowing west.

== See also ==
- Beazell Memorial Forest
- U.S. Route 101
