= Cummins Creek Wilderness =

Wilderness area in Oregon, U.S.

- IUCN category Ib (wilderness area)
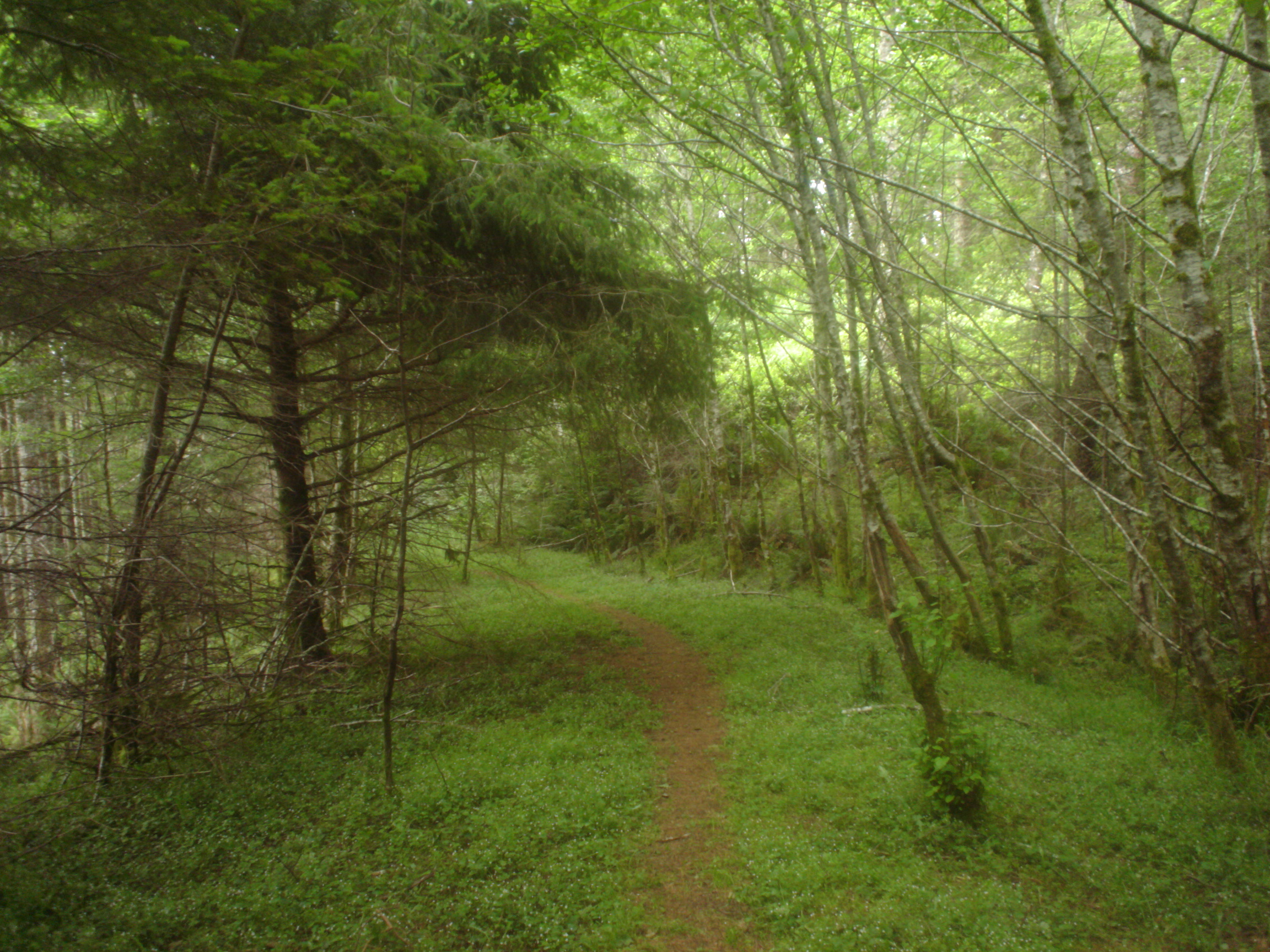
- Cummins Creek Ridge Trail

- Location within the United States Location within Oregon
- Location: Lane County, Oregon, United States
- Nearest city: Yachats, Oregon
- Coordinates: 44°15′05″N 124°02′31″W
- Area: 9,300 acres (3,800 ha)
- Established: 1984
- Governing body: United States Forest Service
- Website: Cummins Creek Wilderness

The Cummins Creek Wilderness is a 9,300-acre (3,800 ha) wilderness area in the Siuslaw National Forest within the Oregon Coast. It is one of three wilderness areas created in the Siuslaw in 1984, along with Drift Creek and Rock Creek. It is "dedicated to preserve in a wilderness state, the last remaining virgin stands of Sitka spruce, western hemlock and Douglas-fir, in Oregon's coast lands". Cummins Creek and nearby Cummins Ridge are named for F.L. Cummins, an early homesteader.

== Topography ==
Cummins Creek Wilderness ranges in elevation from 100 to 2,400 feet (30 to 732 m). Cummins Ridge, which peaks at almost 2,000 feet, splits the rainforest in two. Cummins and Bob Creeks drain west through the dense rainforest to the Pacific Ocean.

== Vegetation ==
Annual precipitation along this part of the Oregon Coast ranges from 80 to 100 inches (2,000 to 2,500 mm), three quarters of this falls between October and June. The Cummins Creek Wilderness features the only old growth Sitka spruce forest in the Oregon Wilderness system. Some of these trees have a diameter of up to nine feet. Cummins and Bob Creeks are lined with red alder and bigleaf maple trees, and understory vegetation consists of rhododendron, salal, sword fern, salmon berry, and elderberry. Wildflowers in the Wilderness include monkey flower, aster, candy flower, and foxglove.

== Wildlife ==
Wildlife in Cummins Creek Wilderness include salmon, steelhead and coastal cutthroat trout which spawn in the creek waters. Roosevelt elk, black-tailed deer, black bear, and spotted owl make their home in the wilderness.

== Recreation ==
Due to the area's thick vegetation, recreation is somewhat limited in Cummins Creek Wilderness. The 6.5-mile (10.5 km) Cummins Creek Loop Trail bisects and is the only trail within the wilderness area. The trail follows an old logging road and eventually meets the Cook's Ridge Trail. The Forest Service claims that fishing is not very good in Cummins Creek, and due to the fragile condition of the soil in the wilderness, horseback riding is not allowed.

== See also ==
- List of Oregon Wildernesses
- List of U.S. Wilderness Areas
- List of old growth forests

== Gallery ==
Images of Cummins Creek Wilderness Area

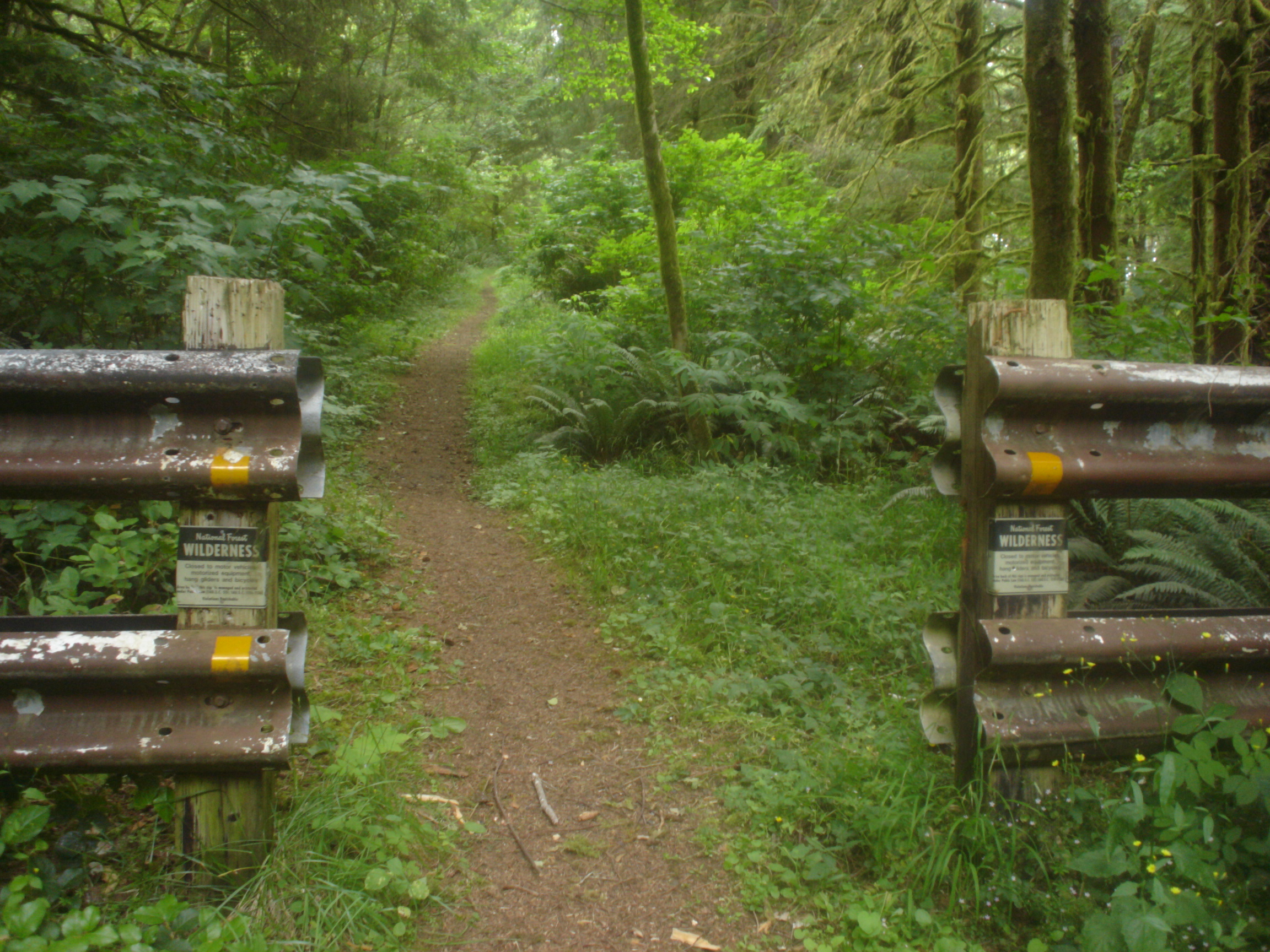
Entrance to Cummins Creek Wilderness

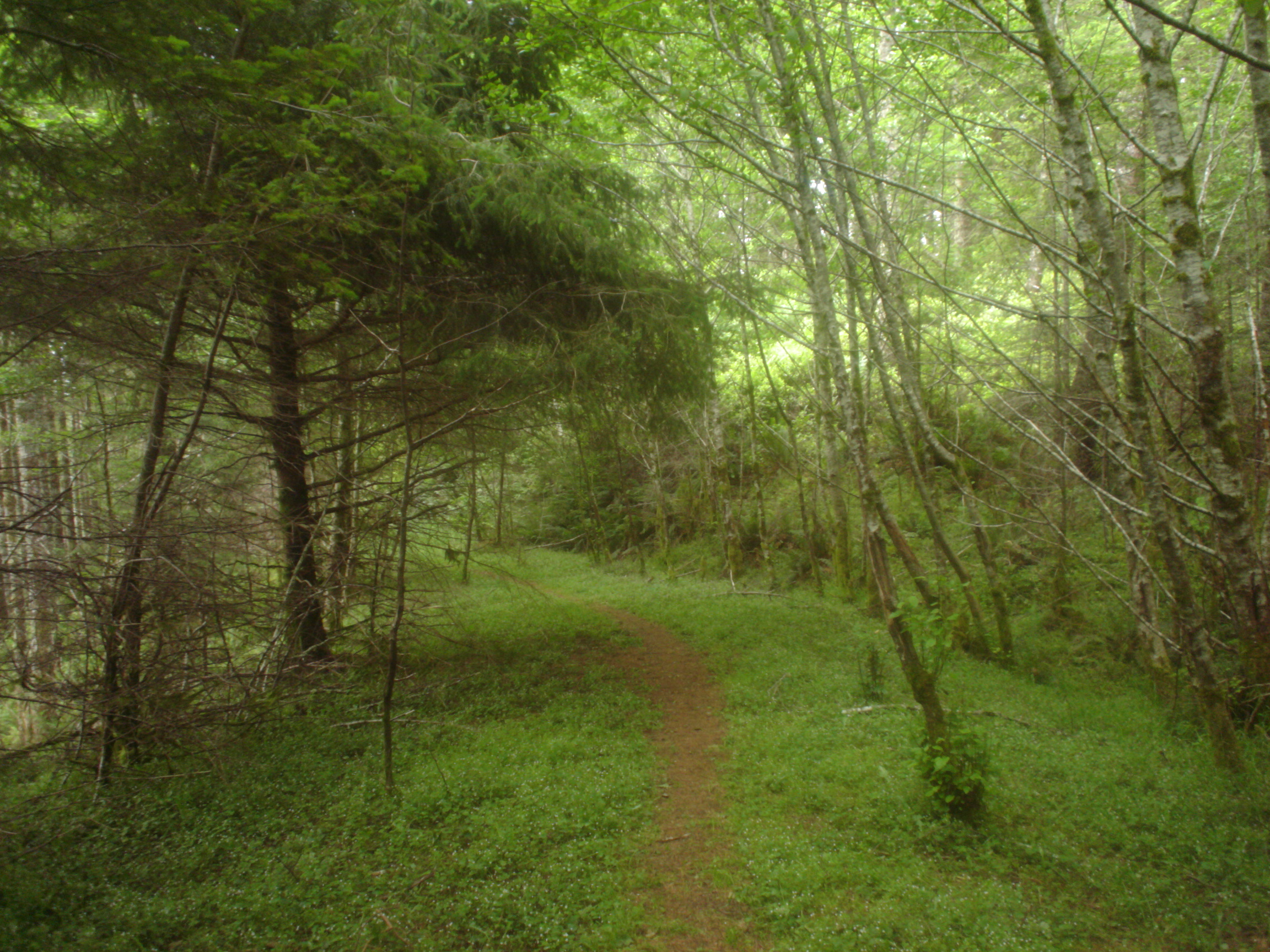
Cummins Creek Ridge Trail
