= Rock Creek Wilderness =

Wilderness area in Oregon, United States

- IUCN category Ib (wilderness area)
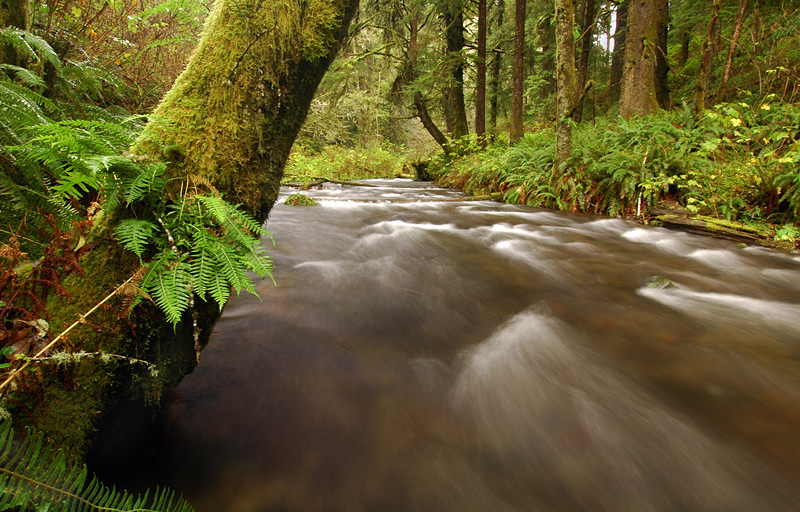
- Rock Creek

- Location within the United States Location within Oregon
- Location: Lane County, Oregon, United States
- Nearest city: Yachats, Oregon
- Coordinates: 44°10′49″N 124°03′21″W
- Area: 7,486 acres (3,029 ha)
- Established: 1984
- Governing body: United States Forest Service
- Website: Rock Creek Wilderness

The Rock Creek Wilderness is a wilderness area comprising 7,486 acres (3,029 ha) within the Siuslaw National Forest on the Oregon Coast. It was created in 1984, along with the Drift Creek Wilderness and Cummins Creek Wilderness. The Rock Creek Wilderness has "no developed trails or trailheads".

== Topography ==
Rock Creek Wilderness is characterized by steep slopes, dense forest, and thick brush. Two streams (Rock Creek and Big Creek), separated by a broad ridge, traverse the area and flow westward to the Pacific Ocean.

== Vegetation ==
Rock Creek Wilderness is primarily coniferous rainforest with dense ground cover. Bigleaf Maple and Red Alder trees line both creeks. Old-growth Douglas-fir can be found in the eastern portion of this area, giving way to old-growth Sitka Spruce closer to the ocean. Other vegetation include Salal, Salmonberry, Western Swordfern, and rhododendron.

== Wildlife ==
One unique inhabitant of this area is the Oregon silverspot butterfly. These endangered orange-and-brown butterflies can be found on the ridge between the creeks. Salmon, steelhead, and coastal cutthroat trout migrate upstream along both creeks each year to spawn.

== See also ==
- List of Oregon Wildernesses
- List of U.S. Wilderness Areas
- List of old growth forests

== Gallery ==
Images of Rock Creek

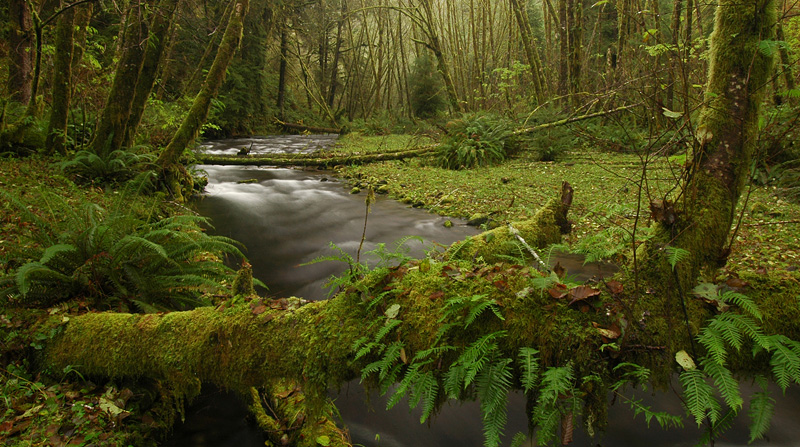

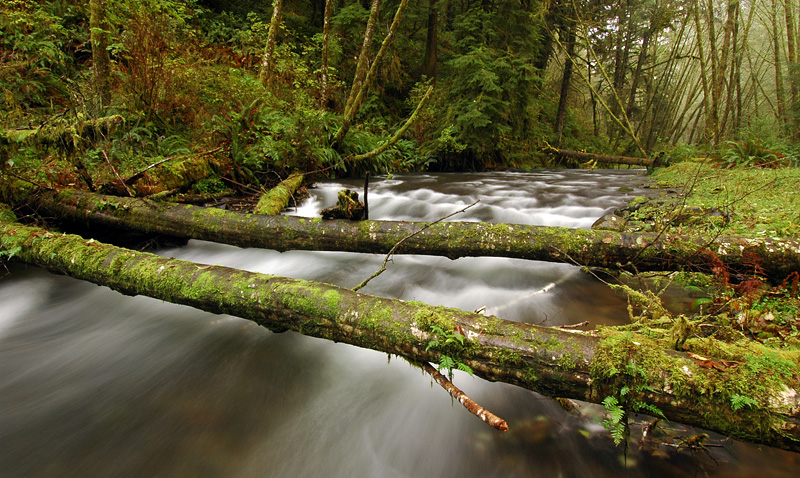

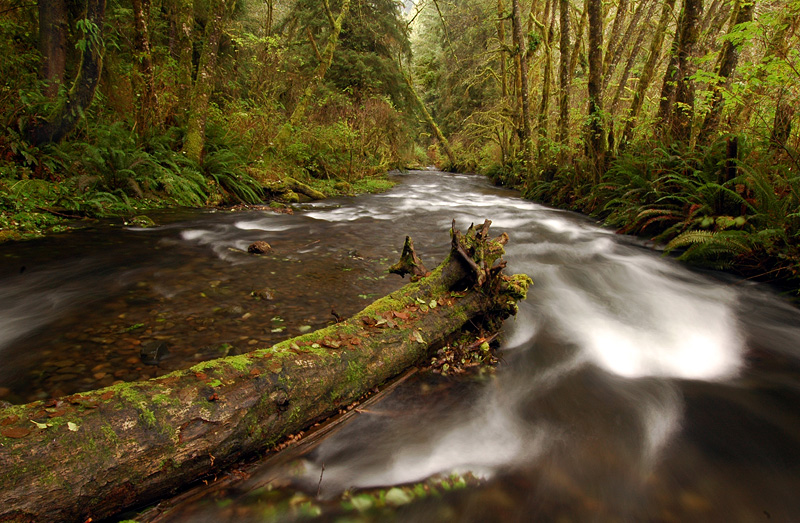

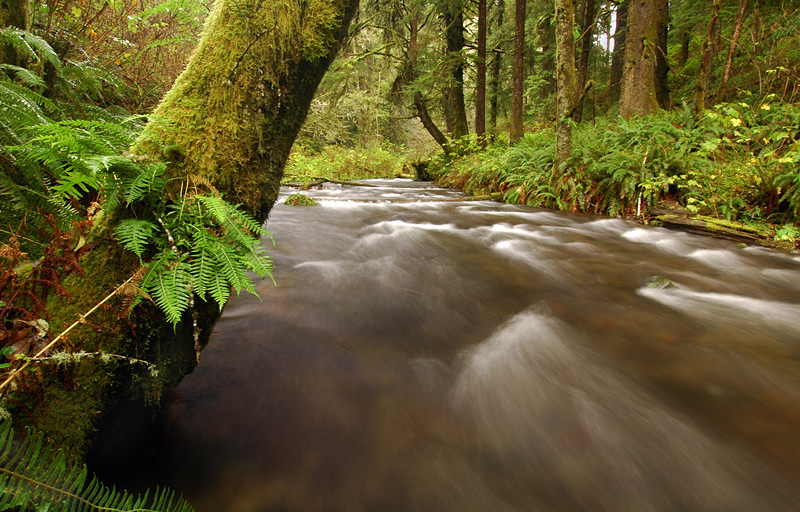
