= Drift Creek Wilderness =

Wilderness area in Oregon, USA

- IUCN category Ib (wilderness area)
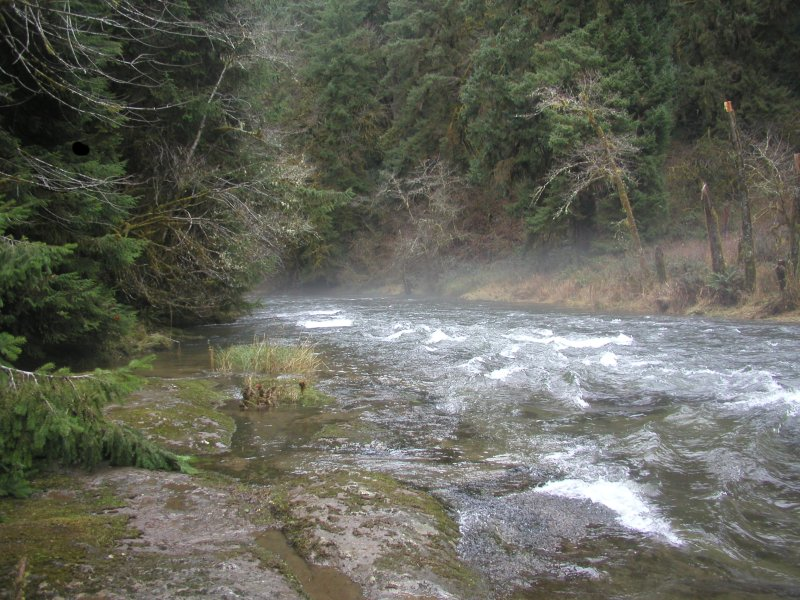
- Drift Creek

- Location within Oregon Location within the United States
- Location: Lincoln County, Oregon, United States
- Nearest city: Waldport, Oregon
- Coordinates: 44°27′47.52″N 123°55′42.2394″W
- Area: 5,798 acres (23.46 km^{2})
- Established: 1984
- Governing body: United States Forest Service
- Website: Drift Creek Wilderness

Drift Creek Wilderness is a 5,798-acre (2,346 ha) wilderness area in the Siuslaw National Forest on the Oregon Coast. It was created in 1984, along with two other small wilderness areas in the forest - Cummins Creek Wilderness and Rock Creek Wilderness. The elevation of Drift Creek ranges from 150 to 1,500 feet (46 to 457 m), and is characterized by long steep slopes with broken and uneven terrain. Drift Creek was named for the accumulations of driftwood on its banks.

== Human history ==
Natives of the Alsea tribe used to hunt and gather berries in Drift Creek Wilderness and the surrounding area. Later, in the early 20th century, American settlers tried unsuccessfully to homestead the wilderness. Fred Purath operated a subsistence farm and ran a few head of cattle. When he died in the early 1940s his land was purchased by Earl Harris. The only relic of the so-called Harris Ranch homestead is a moss-covered stove and stove parts along the Harris Ranch Trail.

== Vegetation ==
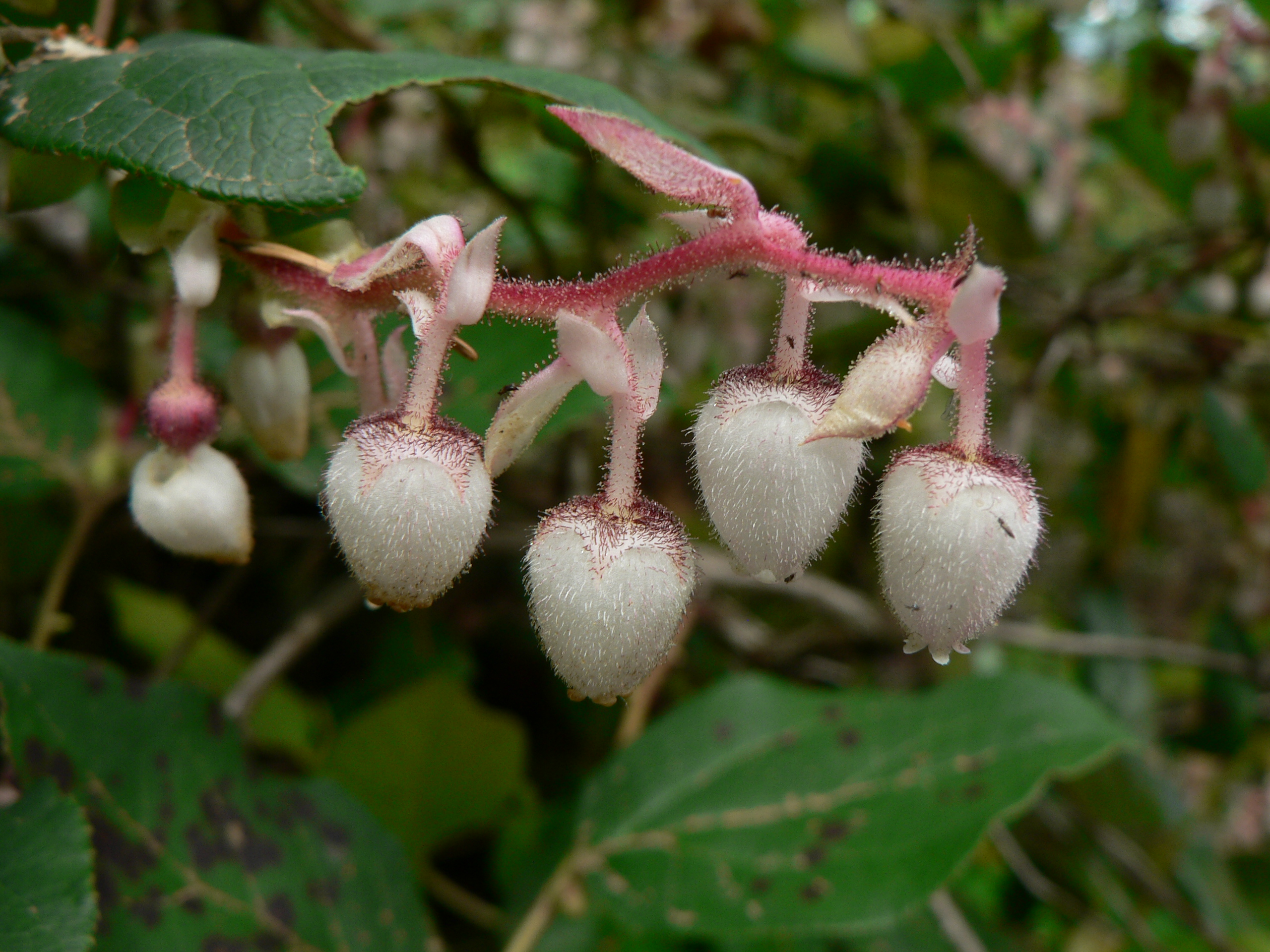
Salal (Gaultheria shallon)

Drift Creek Wilderness generally receives some 120 inches (3,000 mm) of rain per year, which leads to a very lush environment. It contains one of the largest remaining stands of old growth in the Coast Range. Sitka spruce, western hemlock, western red cedar, and Douglas fir dominate the area, but bigleaf maple and red alder can be found as well. Much of the underbrush is licorice fern, oxalis, salmonberry, thimbleberry, huckleberry, foxglove, trillium, sword fern, and salal.

== Wildlife ==
Roosevelt elk, black-tailed deer, and black bear share Drift Creek Wilderness with two endangered Oregon species - the northern spotted owl and the bald eagle. In autumn, Chinook and coho salmon, as well as steelhead and coastal cutthroat trout use Drift Creek, a tributary of the Alsea River, to spawn.

== Recreation ==
Primary recreational activities in Drift Creek Wilderness include hiking, hunting, fishing, and wildlife watching. Fishing is managed for native fish only. There are approximately 8.5 miles (14 km) of trail in the wilderness area. Horseback riding is prohibited due to the fragility of the soil.

== See also ==
- List of Oregon Wildernesses
- List of U.S. Wilderness Areas
- List of old growth forests
- Wilderness Act

== Gallery ==
Images of Drift Creek Wilderness Area

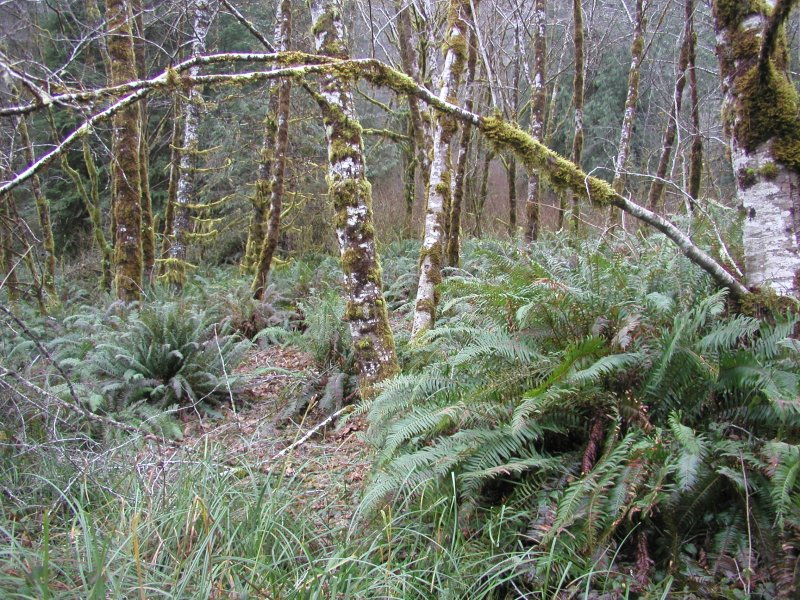
Red alder and sword fern near Drift Creek

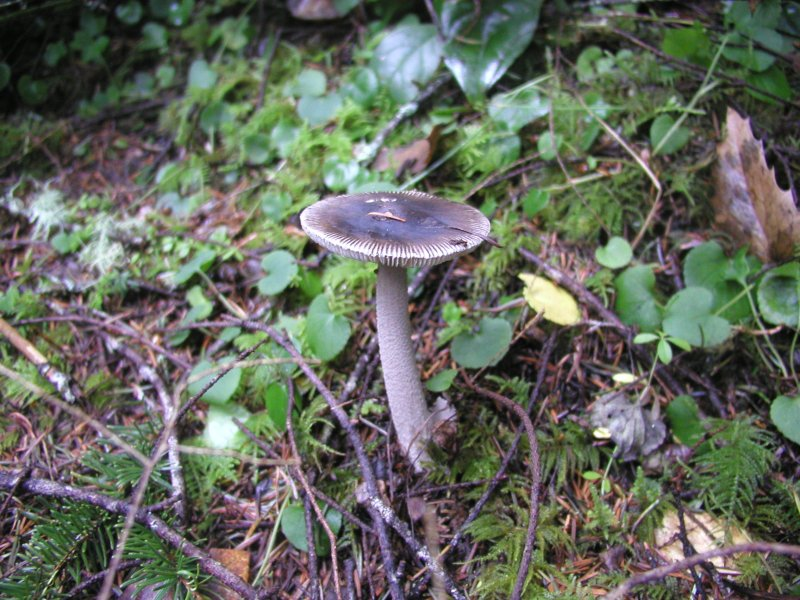
Mushroom in the Drift Creek Wilderness
