= Siuslaw National Forest =

Federally managed forest tract in Oregon, USA

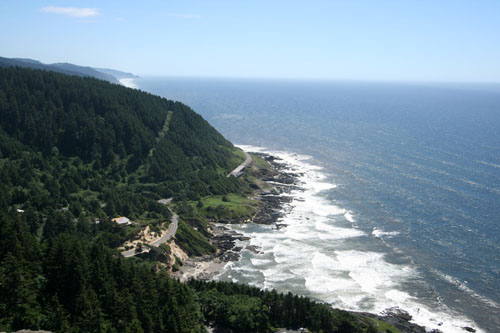
- Cape Perpetua on the Lincoln County coast

- Location within the United States
- Location: Oregon, United States
- Nearest city: Corvallis, Oregon
- Coordinates: 44°20′00″N 123°55′00″W
- Area: 634,207 acres (2,566.54 km^{2})
- Established: July 1, 1908
- Visitors: 1,017,000 (in 2016)
- Governing body: United States Forest Service
- Website: Siuslaw National Forest

The Siuslaw National Forest (/saɪˈjuːslɔː/ sy-YOO-slaw) is a national forest in western Oregon in the United States. Established in 1908, the Siuslaw is made up of a wide variety of ecosystems, ranging from coastal forests to sand dunes.

== Geography ==
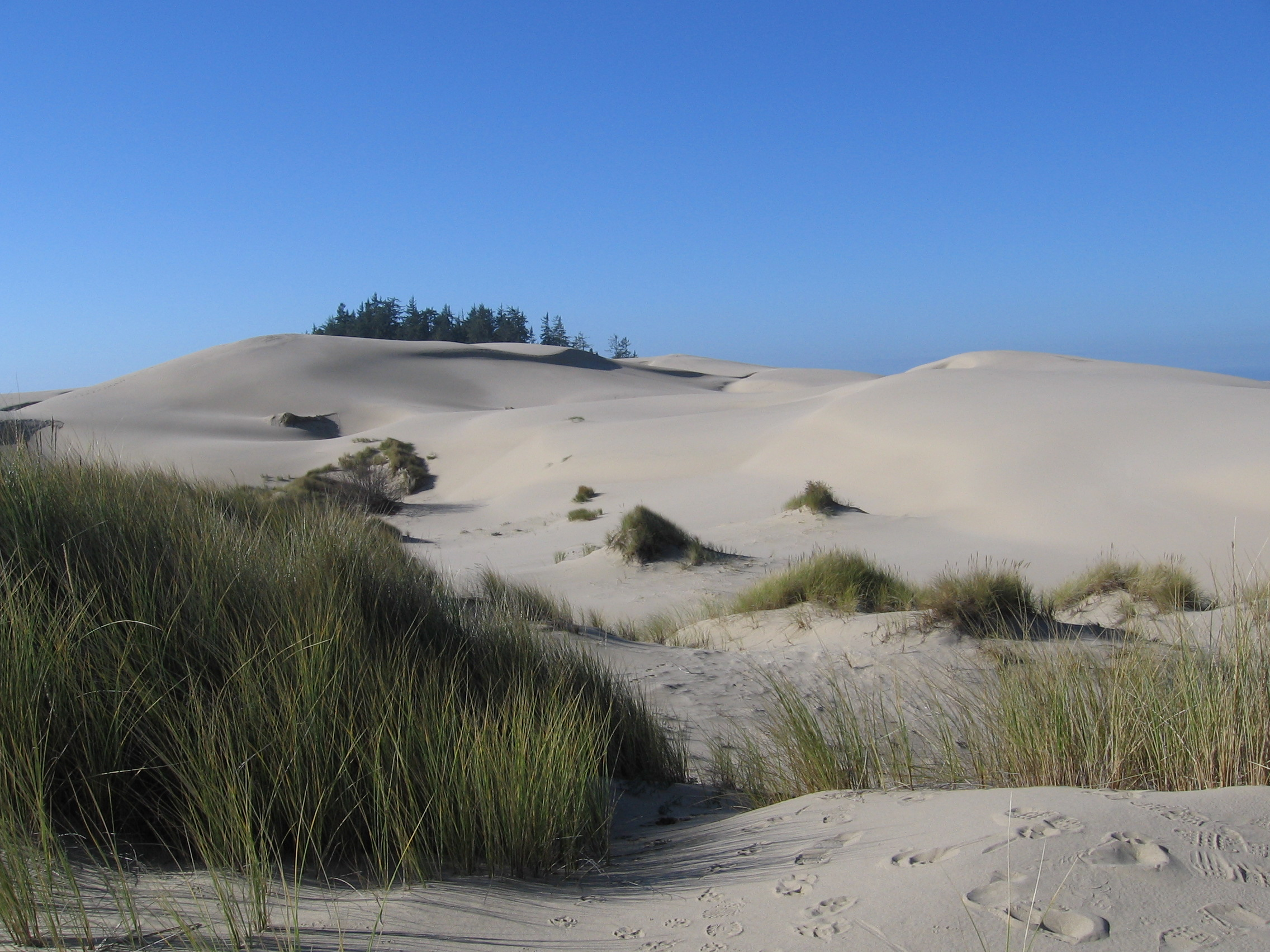
Sand dunes at Oregon Dunes National Recreation Area

The Siuslaw National Forest encompasses more than 630,000 acres (2,500 km^{2}) along the central Oregon Coast between Coos Bay and Tillamook, and in some places extends east from the ocean, beyond the crest of the Oregon Coast Range, almost reaching the Willamette Valley. The forest lies primarily in Lane County (39% of the forest) and Lincoln County (27% of the forest); the rest in descending order of land area are Tillamook, Douglas, Yamhill, Benton, Coos, and Polk counties. It includes the Sand Lake Recreation Area and the Oregon Dunes National Recreation Area. The Forest Supervisor's office is located in Corvallis, and the Siuslaw is broken up into two ranger districts—the Hebo Ranger District, with approximately 151,000 acres (610 km^{2}), and the Central Coast Ranger District, with approximately 479,000 acres (1,940 km^{2}).

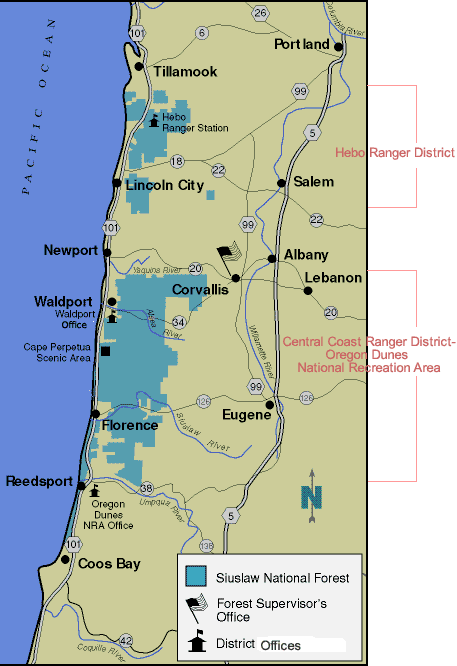
Map of the Siuslaw National Forest and surrounding areas

The forest contains Marys Peak, the highest point in the Oregon Coast Range at 4,097 feet (1,249 m). Numerous aquatic habitats are found in the forest: marine shore, rivers and streams—1,200 miles (1,900 km), including the Alsea, Nestucca, Siuslaw, and Umpqua rivers—and 30 lakes. The terrestrial environment can be regarded as two major vegetation zones, one near the coast dominated by Sitka spruce (Picea sitchensis), and the other dominated by western hemlock (Tsuga heterophylla) and Douglas fir (Pseudotsuga menziesii). Western hemlock often grows in the shade under Douglas fir. Other major tree species in the forest are western red cedar (Thuja plicata), red alder (Alnus rubra), and bigleaf maple (Acer macrophyllum). A 1993 Forest Service study estimated that the extent of old growth in the forest was 33,800 acres (13,700 ha). The Cummins Creek Wilderness and the Rock Creek Wilderness preserve some of this old growth.

== Recreational activities ==
Recreational activities in the Siuslaw National Forest include fishing, camping, hiking, horseback riding, mountain biking, exploring tide pools, and riding off highway vehicles.

== Wilderness areas ==
There are three officially designated wilderness areas within the Siuslaw National Forest that are part of the National Wilderness Preservation System, all established in 1984:

- Drift Creek Wilderness - Lincoln County
- Cummins Creek Wilderness - Lane County
- Rock Creek Wilderness - Lane County

== See also ==
- Beaver Creek Falls in the heart of the forest
- List of national forests of the United States
