= Neskowin Creek =

Creek in Oregon, USA

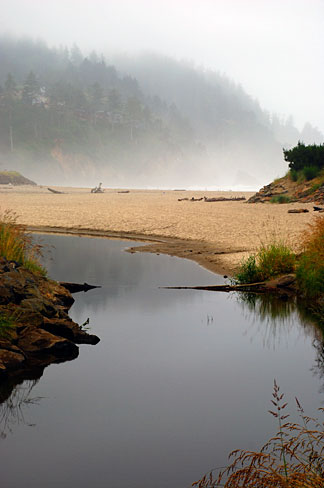
- Neskowin Creek at the beach

- Location of the mouth of Neskowin Creek in Oregon

Location
- Country: United States
- State: Oregon
- County: Tillamook

Physical characteristics
- Source: Central Oregon Coast Range
  - location: Neskowin Ridge
  - coordinates: 45°03′42″N 123°51′38″W
- Mouth: Pacific Ocean estuary
  - location: Neskowin
  - coordinates: 45°05′59″N 123°59′13″W
  - elevation: 7 ft (2.1 m)
- Length: 10 mi (16 km)
- Basin size: 12 sq mi (31 km^{2})

Neskowin Creek is a short stream near the coast of the U.S. State of Oregon. It flows generally west-northwest for about 10 miles (16 km) from the west slope of Neskowin Ridge in the Northern Oregon Coast Range to the Pacific Ocean. Passing through parts of the Siuslaw National Forest in southern Tillamook County, it crosses under U.S. Route 101 (the Oregon Coast Highway) and flows parallel to it until reaching Neskowin Beach State Recreation Site and the community of Neskowin. Proposal Rock, a small island near the shore, is adjacent to the mouth of the creek. Named tributaries from source to mouth are Sutton Creek, which enters from the right, Kingdom Creek from the left, then Sloan, Lewis, Jim, Prospect, and Kiwanda creeks, all from the right.

== See also ==
- List of rivers of Oregon
