= Cascade Head =

Coastal landform in the U.S. state of Oregon

- IUCN category V (protected landscape/seascape)
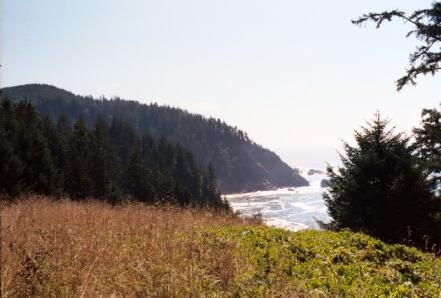
- Cascade Head

- Location within the United States
- Location: Tillamook County, Oregon, United States
- Nearest city: Lincoln City
- Coordinates: 45°03′24″N 124°00′17″W
- Area: 37,162 acres (150.39 km^{2})
- Established: 1966
- Owner: Nature Conservancy

Cascade Head is a headland and 102,110-acre (41,320 ha) United States Forest Service Experimental Forest and part of the World Network of Biosphere Reserves. It is situated 85 miles (137 km) southwest of Portland, Oregon on the Oregon Coast between Lincoln City and Neskowin. It is traversed by US Highway 101, with a pass elevation of approximately 780 feet (240 m), which is the highest point of the highway in Oregon. Cascade Head Preserve is a Nature Conservancy Selected Site.

== UNESCO - Man and the Biosphere Programme ==
Originally established in 1976, through UNESCO's Man and the Biosphere Programme, the Cascade Head Biosphere Region (formerly known as the Cascade Head Biosphere Reserve) was expanded during the 2016 reauthorization to its current footprint. Within its boundaries are the Cascade Head Scenic Research Area, Cascade Head Experimental Forest, the Cascade Head Preserve, and the Cascade Head Marine Reserve and Marine Protected Areas. The diverse ecosystem includes the Salmon River and its estuary, a sandy littoral spit, densely forested coastal rainforest, a two-mile basalt headland covered in native coastal prairie and marine reserve stretching west into the waters of the Pacific. As with modern biosphere regions, there are core protected areas, areas of managed use, and areas of cooperation within the boundary.

== The Nature Conservancy ==
In the early 1960s, volunteers organized an effort to protect Cascade Head from development. By 1966 they had raised funds and purchased the property, and then turned it over to The Nature Conservancy. Because of its ecological significance, Cascade Head Preserve and surrounding national forest and other lands won recognition in 1980 as a National Scenic Research Area and a United Nations Biosphere Reserve.

Conservancy researchers are testing methods of maintaining and restoring grassland habitat for the Oregon silverspot butterfly, including prescribed fire. Conservancy ecologists also monitor the populations of rare plants throughout the year. In spring and summer, teams of volunteers remove invasive species (such as Himalayan blackberry), help maintain trails, assist with research projects, and teach visitors about the Preserve.

== Experimental Forest ==
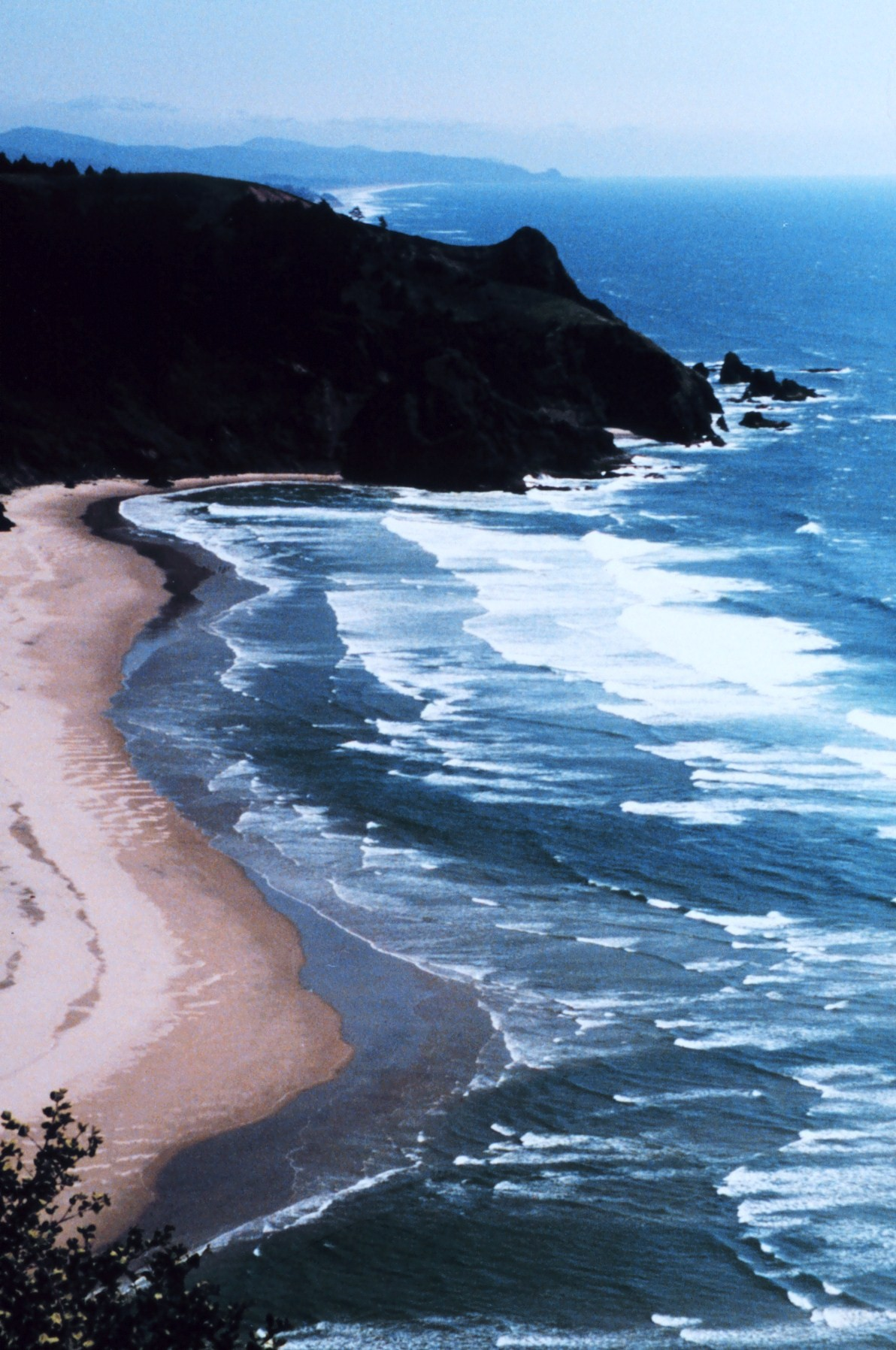
View from Cascade Head

The 11,890-acre (4,810 ha) Cascade Head Experimental Forest was established in 1934 for scientific study of typical coastal Sitka spruce-western hemlock forests found along the Oregon Coast. The forest stands at Cascade Head have been used for long-term studies, experimentation, and ecosystem research since then. In 1974 an act of Congress established the 9,670-acre (3,910 ha) Cascade Head Scenic Research Area that includes the western half of the experimental forest, several prairie headlands, the Salmon River estuary to the south, and contiguous private lands.

Before the establishment of the experimental forest in 1934 and for sometime after, an intense forest inventory was done to determine distribution, age classes, and volumes of major tree species. Early research at Cascade Head includes studies that determined life history and characteristics of native tree species; growth and yield of Sitka spruce-western hemlock, Douglas-fir, and red alder stands; and basic relations between vegetation and climate. A climate station established in 1936 is still operating and is an official United States Weather Bureau site. Between the 1940s and the 1960s, experimental, commercial sized harvests were done to evaluate the silvicultural and economic results of various tree-cutting methods. Current research is being done on forest ecosystem productivity, wind disturbance, nutrient cycling, and global carbon cycling.

Research on the Salmon River estuary has been ongoing since the first dike breaching in 1979. Reestablishment of the salt marsh ecosystems continues to be studied and more recently use of these restored ecosystems by anadromous fish is being studied.

== Flora and fauna ==
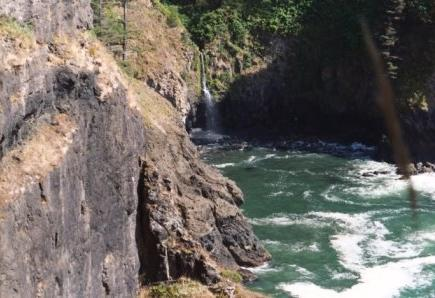
Cascade Head

Cascade Head is home to many native plant species, including red fescue, wild rye, Pacific reedgrass, coastal paintbrush, goldenrod, blue violet and streambank lupine. The hairy checkermallow (Sidalcea hirtipes) is a rare flower found here.

Ninety-nine percent of the world's population of the Cascade Head catchfly is found here. The Oregon silverspot butterfly, federally listed as a threatened species, is known from only five other locations in the world. The butterfly depends on a single plant species, the early blue violet (or hookedspur violet, Viola adunca, which grows coastal grassland openings), to serve as food for its larvae. Elk, deer, coyote, cougar, black bear, snowshoe hare and the Pacific giant salamander are also found in the preserve, as well as osprey, bald eagle, great horned owl, northern harrier, red-tail hawk and the occasional peregrine falcon.

== Geology ==
Cascade Head is an extinct, uplifted volcano that was once under the Pacific Ocean.

== See also ==
- UNESCO Cascade Head Biosphere Region
- Cascade Head Biosphere Collaborative
- Nature Conservancy
- Siletz Reef
- Sitka Center for Art and Ecology
