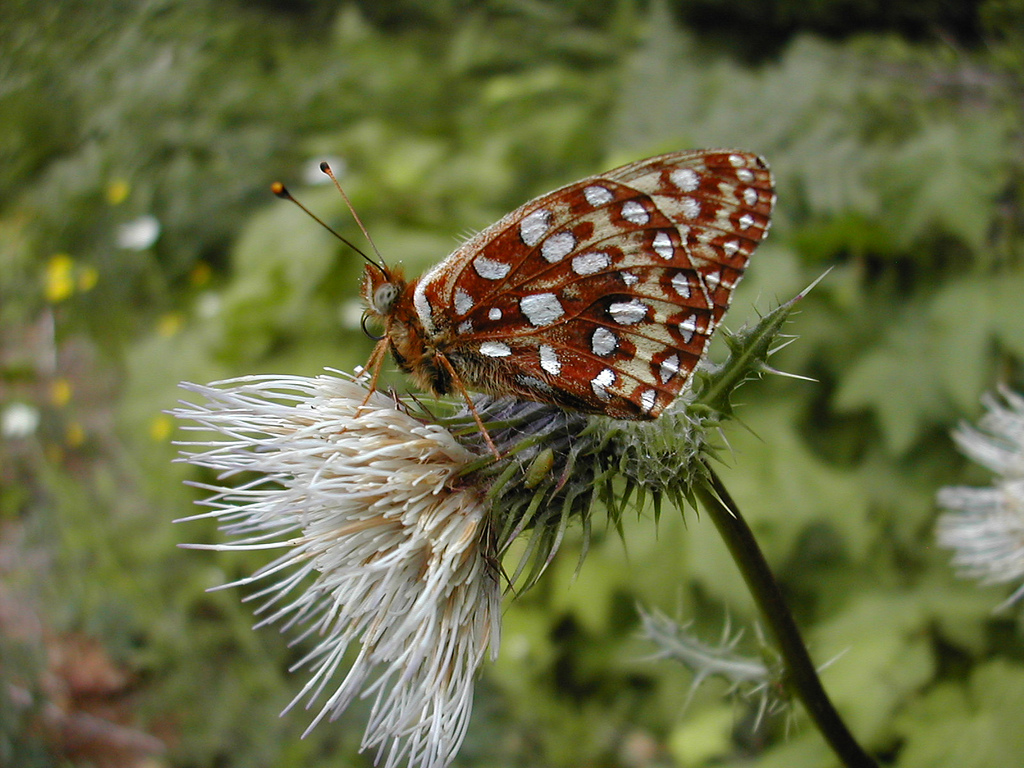

Conservation status
- Threatened (ESA)

Scientific classification
- Kingdom: Animalia
- Phylum: Arthropoda
- Class: Insecta
- Order: Lepidoptera
- Family: Nymphalidae
- Genus: Speyeria
- Species: S. zerene
- Subspecies: S. z. hippolyta

Trinomial name
- Speyeria zerene hippolyta W. H. Edwards, 1879

= Speyeria zerene hippolyta =

Oregon silverspot

Subspecies of butterfly

Speyeria zerene hippolyta, the Oregon silverspot, is a threatened butterfly that is found in the U.S. states of California and Oregon. It is a subspecies of Speyeria zerene.

== Taxonomy ==
Speyeria zerene hippolyta was described by American lepidopterist William Henry Edwards in 1879 as a subspecies of Speyeria zerene, Zerene Fritillary, which was described by French lepidopterist Jean Baptiste Boisduval in 1852.

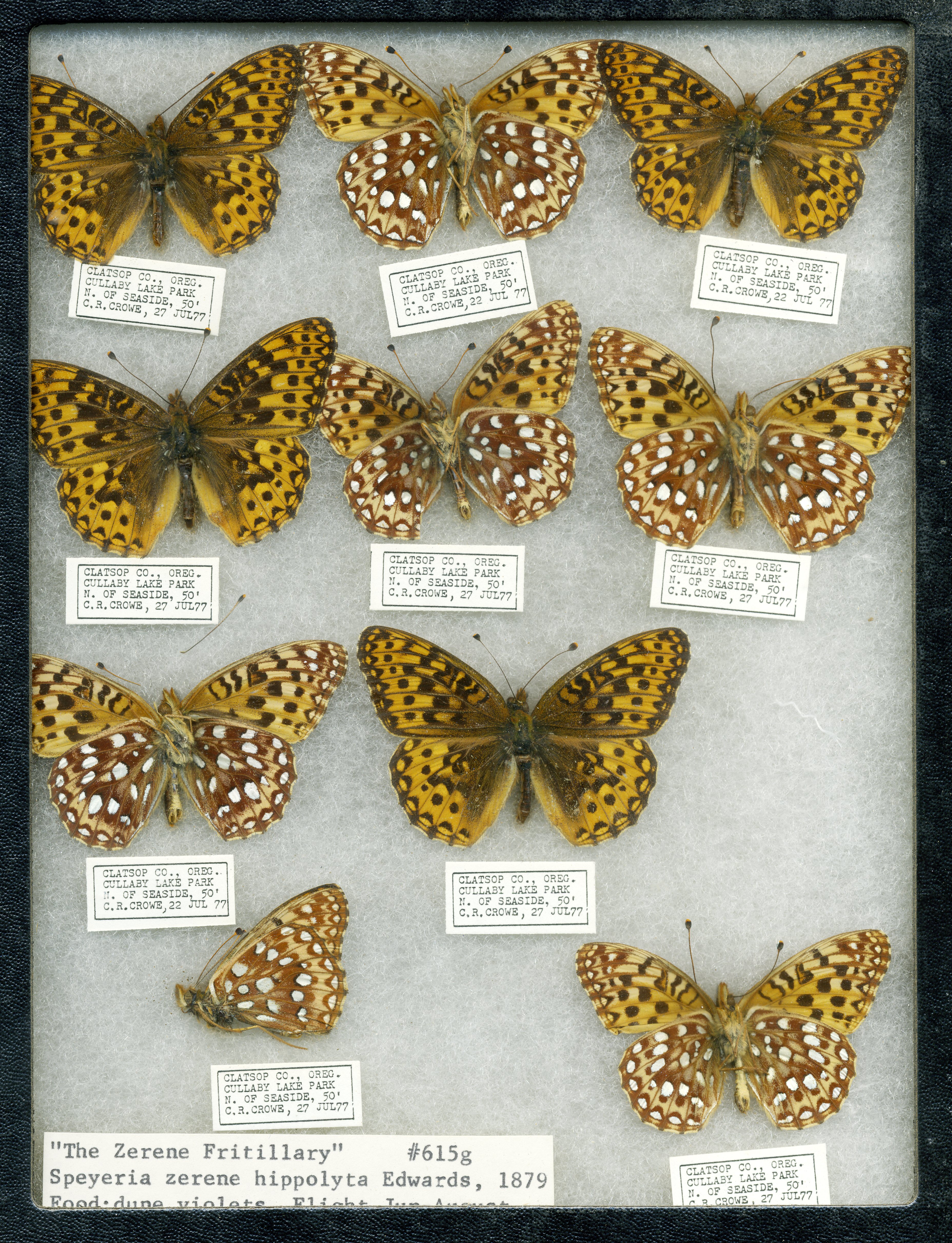
Tray of Speyeria zerene hippolyta butterfly specimens ("Oregon Silverspot" by born1945, 2012.)

== Phylogeny ==
Speyeria zerene hippolyta is in a clade of three closely related subspecies. In suitable habitat along the U.S. Pacific coast, it is the northernmost one found. Further south, Myrtle's silverspot (Speyeria zerene myrtleae) had a range along the coast from San Mateo County to Sonoma County, California, and Behren's silverspot (Speyeria zerene behrensii) had a range along the northern California coast.

McHugh et al. (2013) conducted a genetic analysis of S. z. hippolyta and other S. zerene subspecies using mitochondrial DNA (mtDNA) and nuclear markers with a goal of identifying evolutionarily significant units (ESUs). There wasn't consensus among mitochondrial and nuclear markers so researchers were not able to resolve phylogenetic relationships or identify the taxa as monophyletic through genetic analysis. However, it was discovered that the populations located at Rock Creek and Mt. Hebo have mtDNA haplotypes that are distinctive.

== Distribution and habitat ==
The Oregon silverspot used to inhabit suitable coastal habitat from northern California, through Oregon, into southern Washington. There are 20 historical sites known. It can now only be found in the wild at five remaining sites in California and Oregon. Conservation sites include Cascade Head and the Rock Creek Wilderness in Oregon. The butterfly can also be found at Mount Hebo and Bray Point in Oregon, and at Lake Earl in California. The butterfly has been determined to be extirpated from Clatsop Plains in Oregon since 2001.

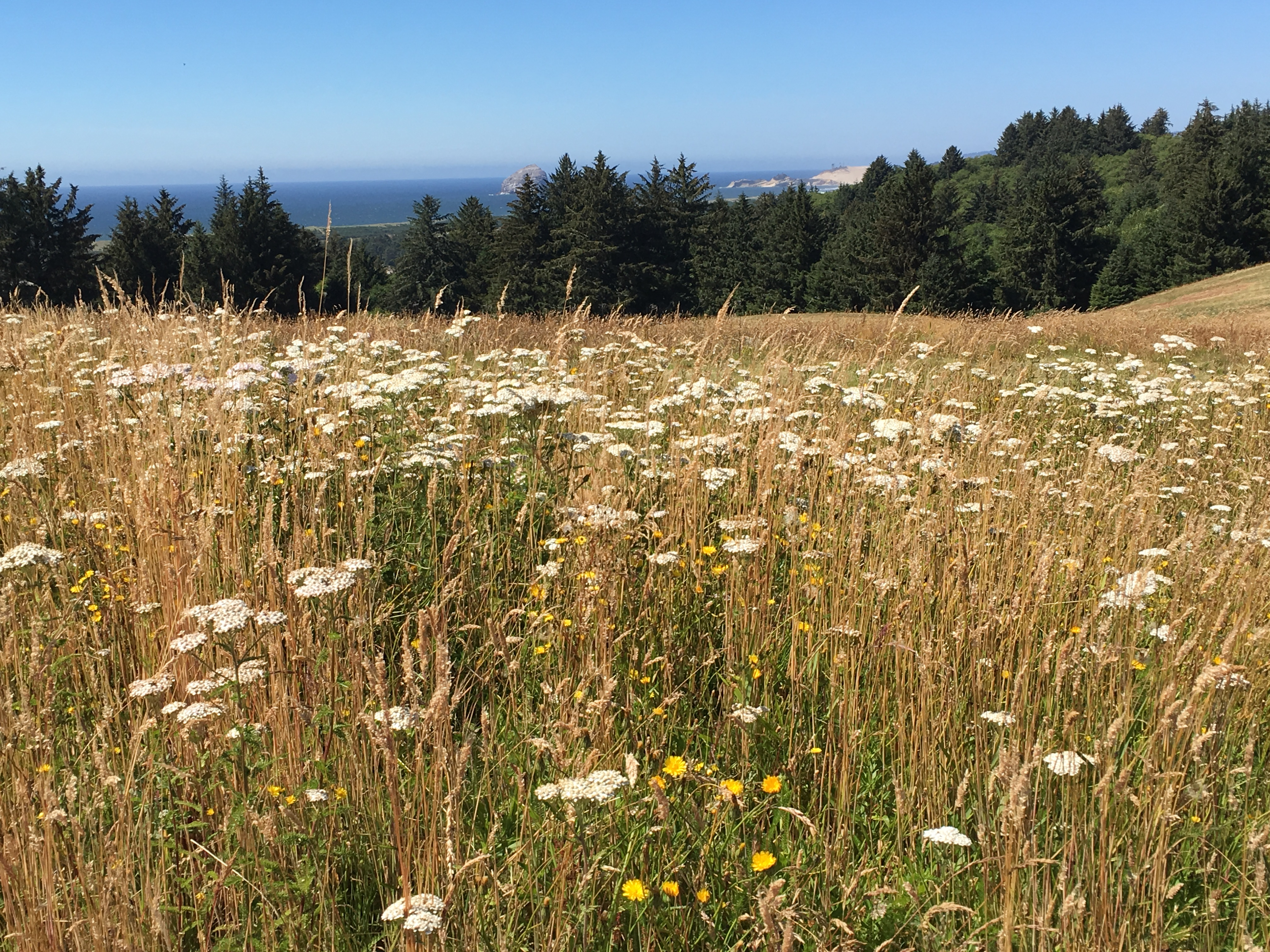
Oregon silverspot habitat ("Nestucca Bay Landscape" by Brent Lawrence / USFWS, 2017.)

The coastal habitats used by the butterfly were kept in an early successional state by high wind, salt-spray and occasional wildfires, providing the open conditions required by the hooked spur violet (Viola adunca) which is the butterfly's larval host plant. In recent years, although the winds and ocean salt spray continue to limit other vegetation growth, the wildfires have been suppressed due to modern development in this habitat. The original habitat of open meadows has, over time, been replaced by forest habitat.

== Conservation status ==
The butterfly was listed as threatened by the U.S. Fish and Wildlife Service (USFWS) under the Endangered Species Act (ESA) in 1980. In Washington, the butterfly is listed as endangered under that state's legislation, though it is now reported extirpated from this state. California and Oregon do not have endangered species statutes that allow the listing of insect species, but they still have protection in these states under the federal ESA. It is on the Special Animals list created by the California Department of Fish and Game. In Oregon the Oregon Biodiversity Information Center (ORBIC), under the Oregon Natural Heritage Act (Oregon Natural Areas Act), maintains a list of threatened and endangered invertebrates. The ORBIC is located at Portland State University (PSU) within the Institute for Natural Resources (INR). The ORBIC assists the USFWS and the Oregon Department of Fish and Wildlife (ODFW) to carry out conservation programs for invertebrates within the state. The USFWS maintains a timeline of conservation and recovery for the butterfly on their website.

== Conservation efforts ==
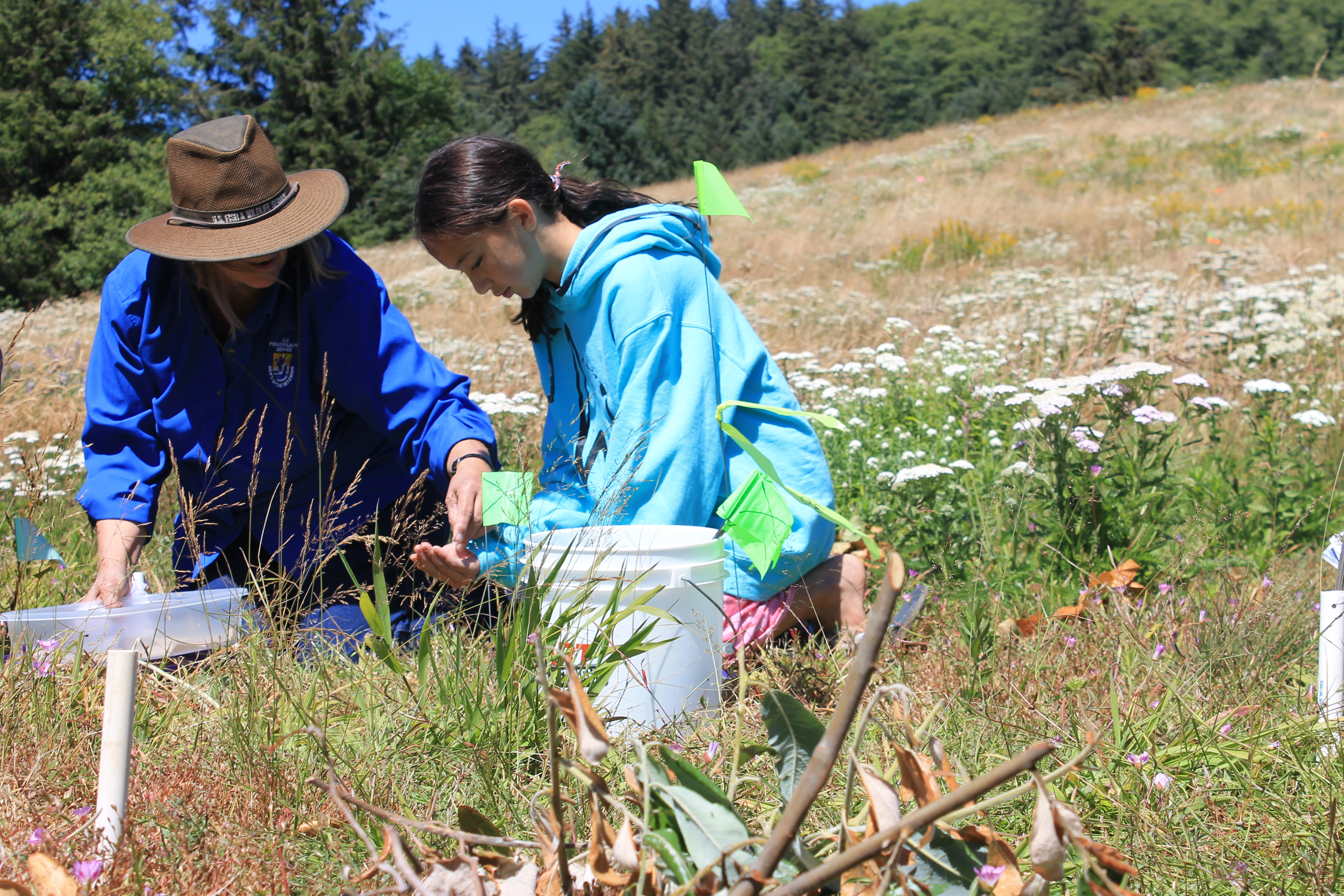
Oregon silverspot release at Nestucca Bay National Wildlife Refuge by Ann Walker and a volunteer. ("Nestucca Bay" by Brent Lawrence / USFWS, 2017.)

Researchers have been testing methods of maintaining and restoring the grassland habitat in coastal preserves, these include prescribed fire. As it does take several years for the hooked spur violet to reach maturity a "stop-gap measure" is underway. A team consisting of the Oregon Nature Conservancy, the U.S. Fish and Wildlife Service, Lewis and Clark College and the Oregon Zoo gather female butterflies for captive rearing. The captive-rearing projects are underway at the college and the Oregon Zoo in Portland and the Woodland Park Zoo in Seattle. After being hatched and raised at the college and the zoos, the young are reintroduced as pupae to the wild to augment the existing populations. After the release of nearly 450 silverspots at Mount Hebo in 2016, Karen Lewis, a zoo conservation research associate, said in a statement, "The goal of the recovery program is to help each population grow large enough to be self-sustaining, if it weren't for this program, three of the five remaining silverspot populations would likely be extinct." The Oregon Zoo released about 2000 silverspots at the Nestucca Bay National Wildlife Refuge in 2017. In 2018, the Oregon Zoo, Woodland Park Zoo, USFWS, and Oregon Parks and Recreation Department (OPRD) collaborated to release 500 silverspots at Saddle Mountain in Oregon in an effort to restore a historical population. The butterflies had not been seen at Saddle Mountain since the 1970s.

The establishment of new colonies may have lasting effects on the genetics of the subspecies. The founding events of isolated small populations may cause a loss of heterozygosity over generations and an accumulation of deleterious recessive alleles without gene flow from other populations. The butterflies may be at increased risk of extinction due to the increased genetic load and reduction in genetic diversity following the population bottleneck before the captive breeding programs.

== Adaptability to climate change ==
Oregon silverspots are considered to be moderately vulnerable to climate change due to their sensitivity to environmental conditions. However, increased fire in a warming climate may open up additional coastal prairie habitat and may help the growth of their only host plant, the early blue violet (Viola adunca), which is partially dependent on fire for germination.

== See also ==
- Evolutionarily significant units
- Fire ecology
- Myrtle's silverspot
- Speyeria zerene
- United States Fish and Wildlife Service list of threatened and endangered arthropods
- Viola adunca
