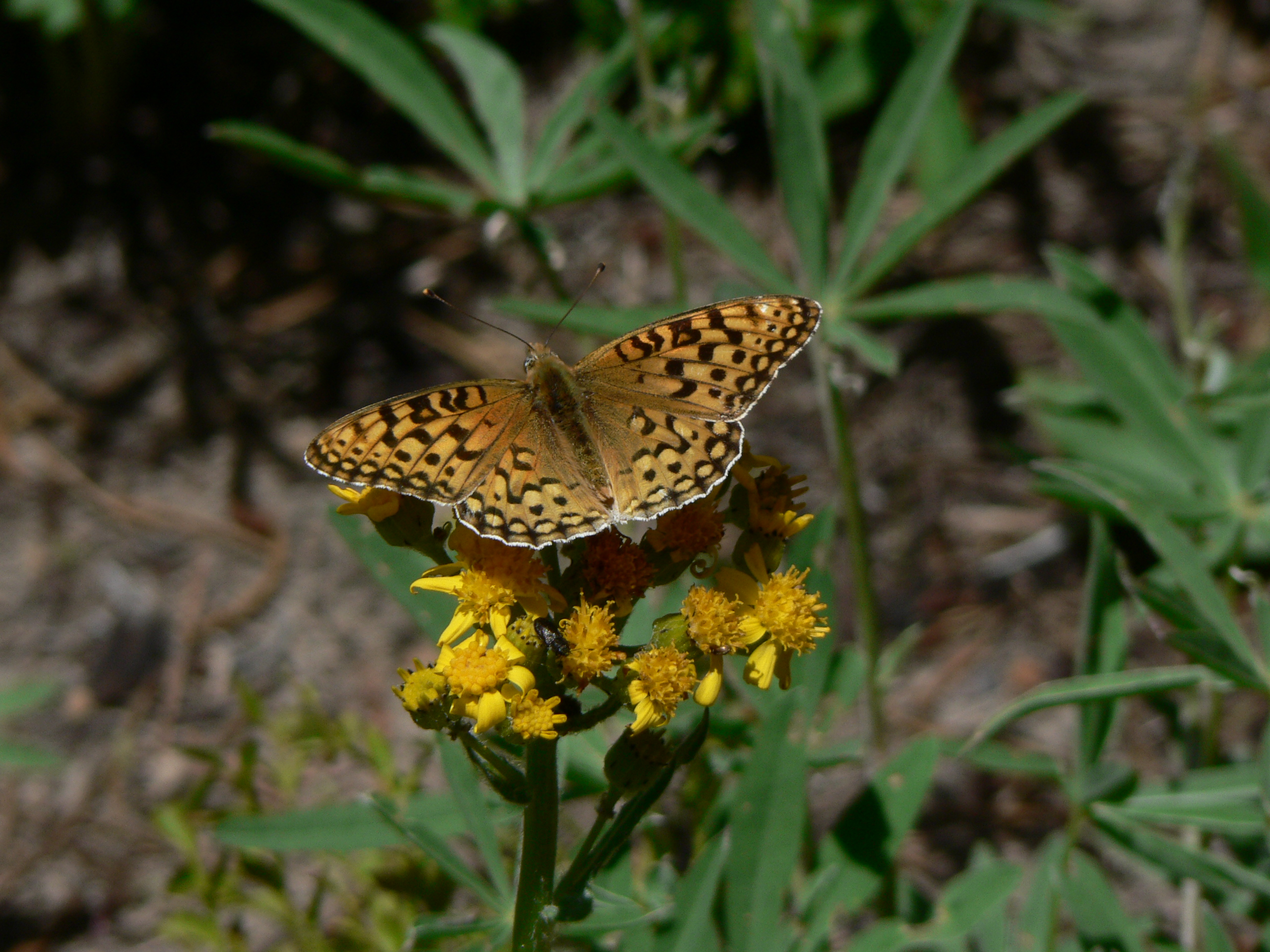

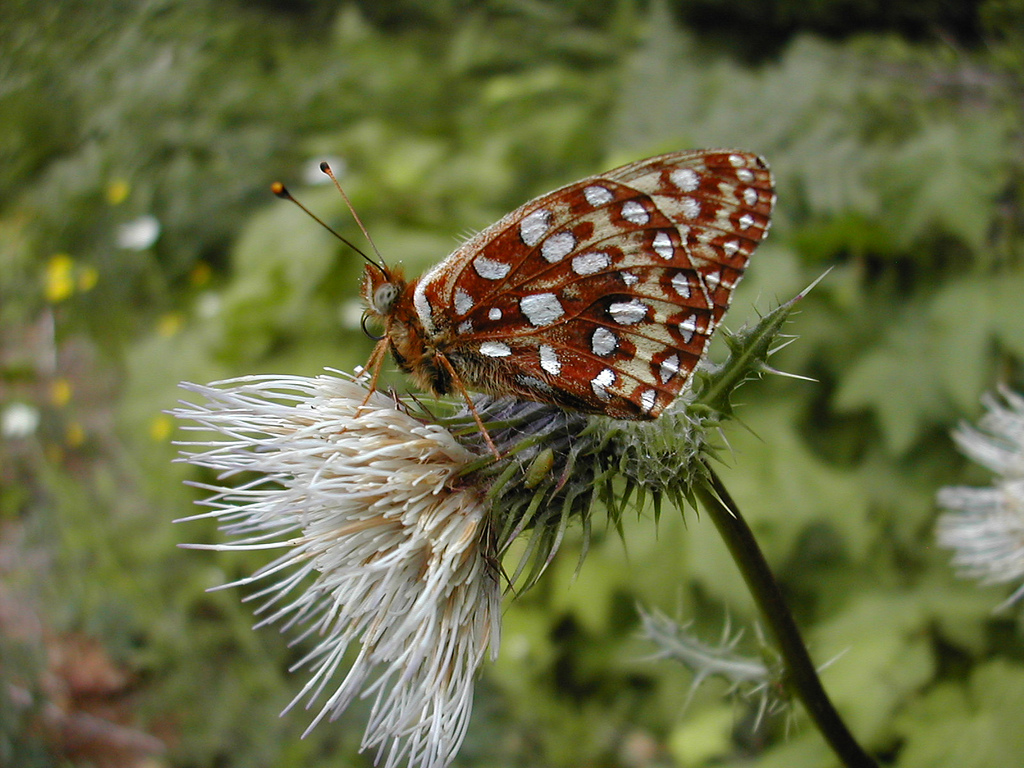
- S. z. hippolyta

Scientific classification
- Domain: Eukaryota
- Kingdom: Animalia
- Phylum: Arthropoda
- Class: Insecta
- Order: Lepidoptera
- Family: Nymphalidae
- Genus: Speyeria
- Species: S. zerene

Binomial name
- Speyeria zerene Swainson, 1827

= Speyeria zerene =

Zerene fritillary

Species of butterfly

Speyeria zerene, the zerene fritillary, is a butterfly found in the western portions of the United States and Canada. The species was first described by William Swainson in 1827.

== Description ==
Speyeria zerene is a medium-sized butterfly whose length ranges from 25 to 28 mm, and the wingspan is about 55 mm. The body of the butterfly is black with orange brown on the upperside of the wings. Also on the underside are black veins with black spots. The undersides of the wings have silver metallic spots. The wings and the body are both covered in fine hairs.

== Range ==
The native range spread from Washington state to California. They are now found in Oregon and California. As of 2013, they were found in numbers in Alpine County, California, at the 9,000 foot (2,700 m) level in the Sierra Nevada range. The best habitats for the butterflies are coastal salt spray meadows, montane meadows, and stabilized dunes. The grasslands provide larval host plants which are a very important component of their habitat.

== Subspecies ==
About 15 subspecies are accepted.

- S. z. behrensii (W. H. Edwards, 1869) – Behren's silverspot
- S. z. bremnerii (W. H. Edwards, 1872)
- S. z. gloriosa Moeck, 1957
- S. z. gunderi (J. A. Comstock, 1925)
- S. z. hippolyta (W. H. Edwards, 1879) – Oregon silverspot
- S. z. malcolmi (J. A. Comstock, 1920)
- S. z. monticola (Behr, 1863)
- S. z. myrtleae dos Passos and Grey, 1945 – Myrtle's silverspot
- S. z. picta (McDunnough, 1924)
- S. z. platina (Skinner, 1897)
- S. z. puntareyes J. Emmel and T. Emmel in T. Emmel, 1998
- S. z. sinope dos Passos and Grey, 1945
- S. z. sitka Hammond, Harry and McCorkle, 2001
- S. z. sonomensis J. Emmel, T. Emmel and Mattoon in T. Emmel, 1998
- S. z. zerene (Boisduval, 1852) – Zerene silverspot

== Conservation ==
In 1999, the U.S. Fish & Wildlife Service initiated a recovery plan for Speyeria zerene. The recovery program helped establish breeding programs in several zoos and colleges that provide captive rearing for Speyeria zerene. In late summer, female butterflies are captured after they have mated and then transferred to a facility where they are induced to lay eggs. After the eggs hatch, the larvae are stored in a refrigerator over winter in order to replicate the conditions of the season. After the winter dormancy, the larvae are fed and cared for until they pupate or are large enough to be returned to the wild.

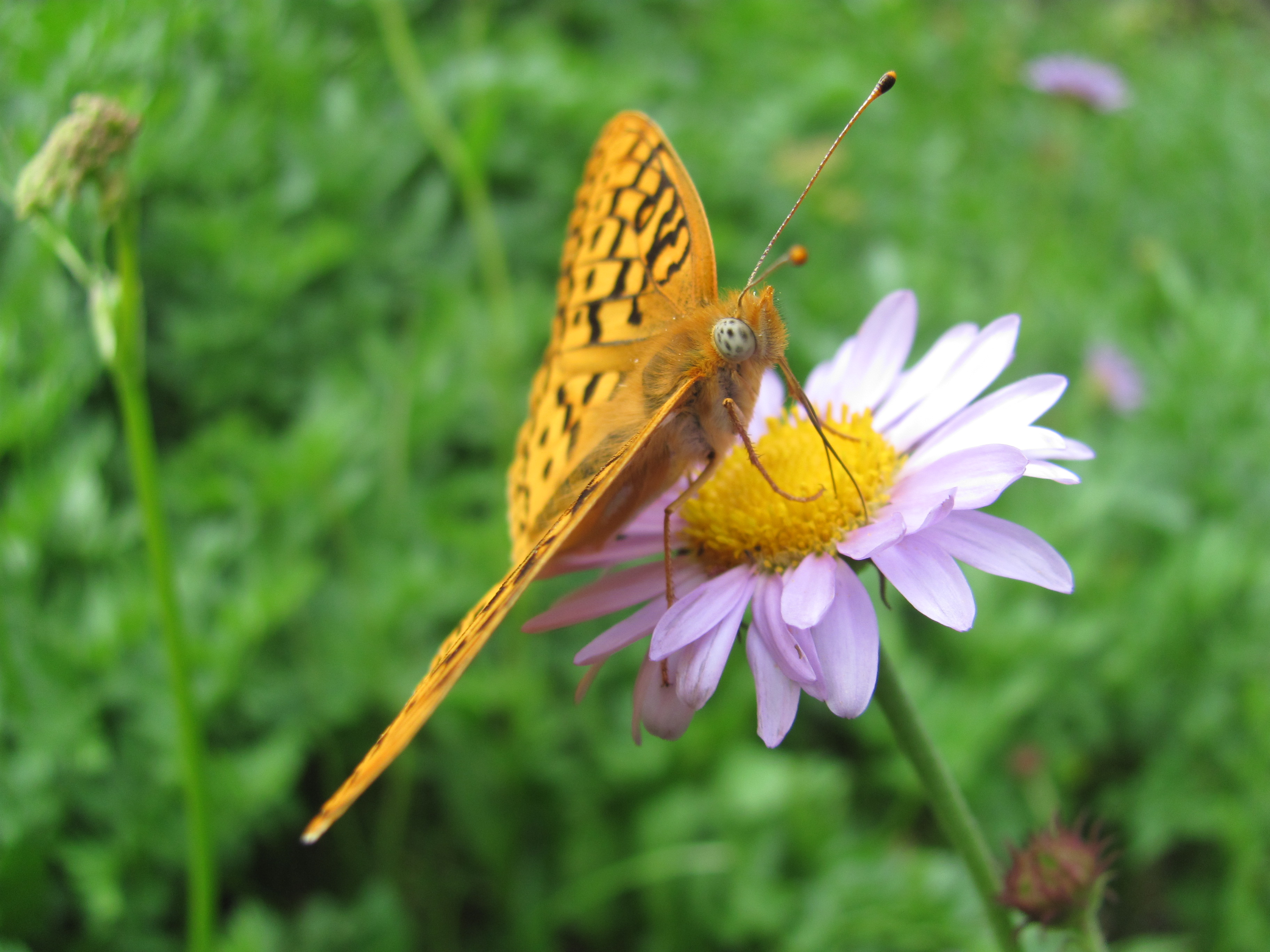
Speyeria zerene as seen in the Ruby Mountains of Nevada

Other programs that are being implemented to help the wild population include the regular mowing of meadows by private home owners, and especially habitat restoration for properties owned by the U.S. Fish and Wildlife Service. One of the most essential components of the Speyeria zerene habitat is the blue violet, or Viola adunca; it is used for the food and shelter of the early stages of a larva's life. However, the blue violet is also threatened by invasive species and the overgrowth of shrubs and trees in meadows. The facilities that have established breeding programs for the butterflies have also set up nurseries for the blue violets. These nurseries are mainly used to provide food for the larvae reared in these facilities, but some violets are also transported and planted in restoration sites.

== Life cycle ==
The life cycle of Speyeria zerene begin when the pink-tan colored eggs hatch. Females lay these eggs on the dried stems and debris of the blue violet (Viola adunca). The larvae, which have spikes on their backs and are dark in color, emerge in the spring. The larvae grow in six stages of development (instars) and feed on the violet until it is time for the larvae to pupate, which they do on the violet. The pupae will remain there for approximately two weeks, until it emerges as a butterfly. The butterfly has a life expectancy of about three weeks. During this time the butterflies mate and feed solely on nectar. Females then lay eggs, and the life cycle starts again.

== Diet ==
The diet of Speyeria zerene varies throughout its life history. When the larva emerges in the spring the diet consists solely on the leaves of the blue violet (Viola adunca). When the adult emerges from its chrysalis it will feed solely on nectar of flowers. It feeds on a variety of plants including ones from the family Asteraceae, its main source of nutrition, but other families of plants that the butterfly may feed on include thistles, asters, yarrow, and pearly everlasting.

== References and external links ==
- Oregon Silverspot butterfly, Fish and Wildlife Service
- The Washington State department of fish and wildlife species of concern
- Silverspot Butterfly Fact Sheet, Woodland Park Zoo, Seattle, WA
- Silverspot Butterfly, Fish and Wildlife Service
- "Species Details Speyeria zerene". University of Alberta Museums. E.H. Strickland Entomological Museum.
- Butterflies and Moths of North America species detail page
