= Phantom forest =

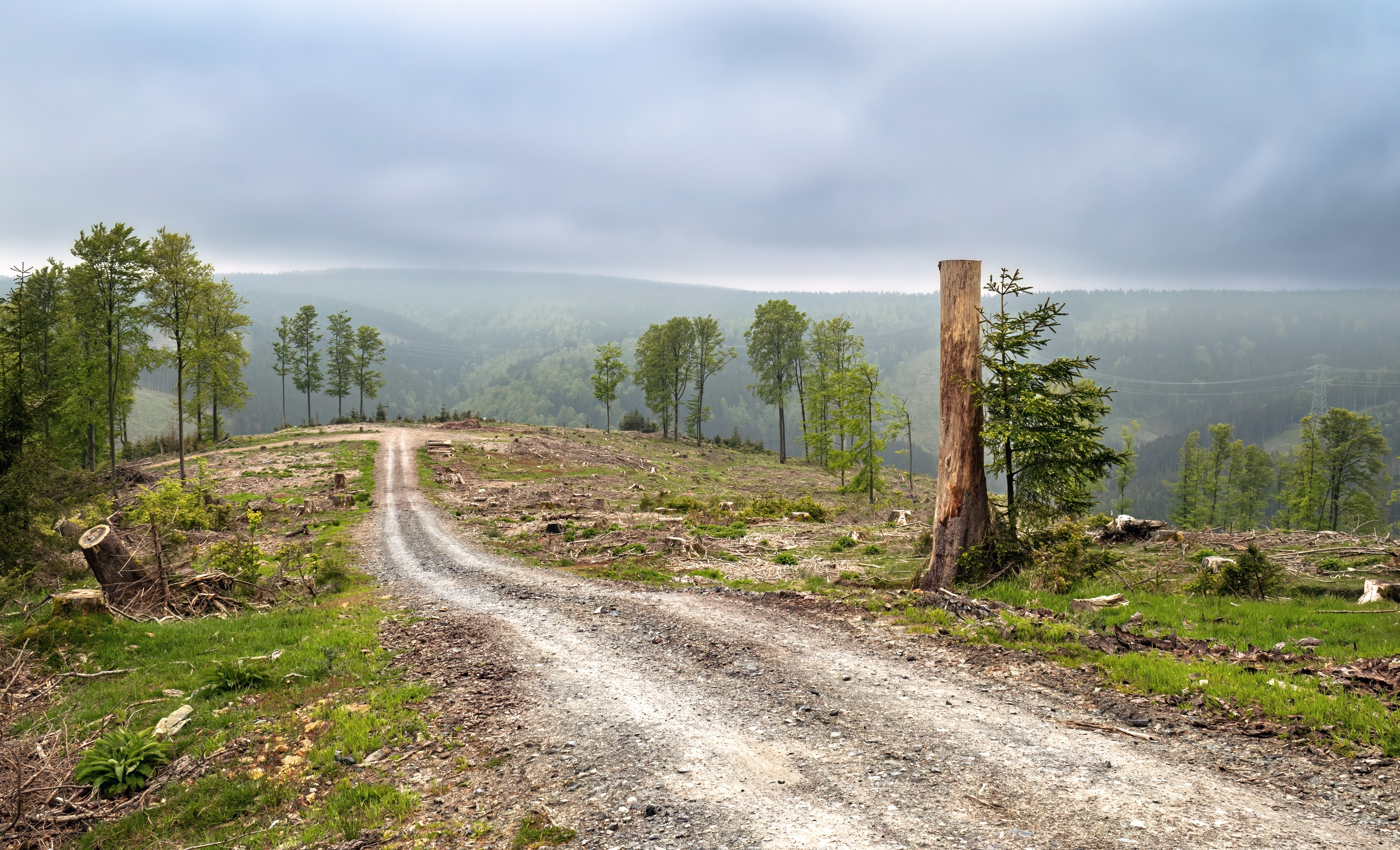
This deforested area in Goldisthal can be called a phantom forest

A phantom forest is an anticipated forest which has failed to survive. The phenomenon is characterized by trees that never emerged or were removed. The trees that make up a phantom forest are called 'phantom trees'. This may seem somewhat odd, because these trees are invisible to the human eye. These trees exist mainly in our expectations regarding the longevity of trees in general, or simply said, these trees exist as lost potential.

The notion is used in a variety of contexts. It may be connected to the effects of climate change or it can be used to describe the failure rate of carbon offsetting schemes. The phantom forest is usually seen a sign of mismanagement, such as greenwashing or intensive deforestation. In case of offsetting schemes, phantom forests are said to also exist 'on paper'.

The notion of 'phantom forest' should not be confused with the notion of 'ghost forest', which refers to an area of deceased trees. However, a ghost forest may eventually become a phantom forest.

== Etymology ==
Although the notion rose to popularity in 2022, the use of 'phantom forest' can be traced back to a few articles that were published in the wake of 2014. One group of authors referred to it as the 'remnants of dry vegetation'. An article by J. Funk appeared for the Union of Concerned Scientists portraying the notion as follows: 'We reached a clearing with a wide-angle view of the phantom forest and distant mountain peaks. Nearby, logging equipment sat at the edge of a recent clear-cut, and we could hear the buzz of chainsaws over the next ridge.' It is implicitly clear in this quote that 'phantom forest' refers to the forest that once was.

== Projects ==
- Aimed at planting 1.5 million hectares of forest in the period 2011-2019, the National Greening Program achieved a dismal survival rate of 12% over the first five years, according to the Commission on Audit of the Philippines government.
- A 2020 field study conducted by D. Wodehouse on Luzon island revealed an astonishing survival rate of only 2% of mangrove seedlings planted. The other 98% has perished or been swept away.
- In 2019 the Turkish government claimed to have planted 11 million trees at 2,000 sites spread across Turkey. Experts estimated that only 5% of the trees had survived.
- Sri Lanka's ambitious mangrove planting program, launched to strengthen coastal defenses after the 2004 Indian Ocean tsunami, has yielded disappointing results. A 2017 study conducted by S. Kodikara revealed a survival rate of less than 37%.
