= Jerry Zimmerman =

American baseball player (1934–1998)

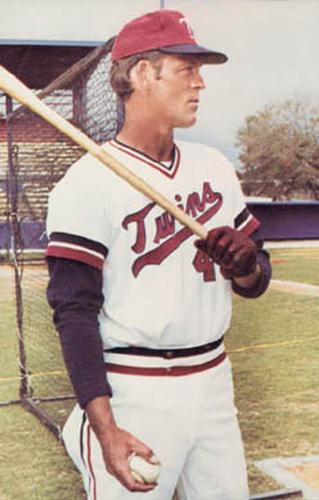
- Catcher
- Born: September 21, 1934; Omaha, Nebraska, U.S.
- Died: September 9, 1998 (aged 63); Neskowin, Oregon, U.S.
- Batted: Right Threw: Right

MLB debut
- April 14, 1961, for the Cincinnati Reds

Last MLB appearance
- September 22, 1968, for the Minnesota Twins

MLB statistics
- Batting average: .204
- Home runs: 3
- Runs batted in: 72
- Stats at Baseball Reference

Teams
- As player: Cincinnati Reds (1961); Minnesota Twins (1962–1968); As coach: Montreal Expos (1969–1975); Minnesota Twins (1976–1980)

Career highlights and awards
- Last coach to umpire a major league game (August 25, 1978).

Gerald Robert Zimmerman (September 21, 1934 – September 9, 1998) was an American professional baseball player and coach. He appeared in almost 500 games over eight seasons in Major League Baseball for the Cincinnati Reds and Minnesota Twins from 1961 to 1968, primarily as a catcher. Born in Omaha, Nebraska, he attended Milwaukie High School in Oregon.

== Playing career ==
=== Minor leagues ===
During his active career, Zimmerman threw and batted right-handed, stood 6 feet 2 inches (1.88 m) tall and weighed 185 pounds (84 kg). He was signed at age 17 by the Boston Red Sox to an $80,000 bonus contract as an amateur free agent in 1952. Zimmerman progressed slowly through the Red Sox' farm system, not reaching the Double-A level until 1957. The following year, 1958, he was promoted to the Minneapolis Millers, Boston's Triple-A farm club, where his manager was Gene Mauch. Led by Mauch, and with Zimmerman catching, the Millers won the American Association and Junior World Series championships. However, a prolonged batting slump during the early months of the next season spurred the Red Sox to release Zimmerman on July 16, 1959. He was picked up by the Baltimore Orioles on the same day, but his slump continued in the Pacific Coast League, and two months later, on September 25, the Orioles released Zimmerman as well.

The Cincinnati Reds then signed him as free agent, and he spent the full 1960 campaign with their Triple-A affiliate, the Seattle Rainiers, where he batted .279 (a 100-point improvement over his previous year's average) with six home runs in 82 games. The Reds then placed him on their 40-man winter roster.

=== Major leagues ===
==== Cincinnati Reds ====
Zimmerman finally got his big break in 1961. He made the Cincinnati squad out of spring training as a backup and when the Reds traded away starting catcher Ed Bailey in late April, Zimmerman not only secured a roster spot, he became the club's most-used receiver during their National League pennant-winning season. He appeared in 76 games behind the plate, starting 64, and caught 5462/3 innings.

Zimmerman's rookie batting average was only .206, but—apart from the production of late-season pickup Darrell Johnson—it led the team's catchers, with Johnny Edwards, a fellow rookie and a future NL All-Star, hitting .186 and Bob Schmidt, obtained for Bailey, hitting .129. In the 1961 World Series, Zimmerman appeared in two games as a late-inning defensive substitution and had no at bats, as the Reds lost to the New York Yankees, four games to one.

==== Minnesota Twins ====
Almost four months after the World Series, Zimmerman was traded on January 30, 1962 to the Minnesota Twins for Dan Dobbek. He played with the Twins for seven seasons, serving mostly as a backup for Earl Battey. When the Twins won the 1965 American League pennant, Zimmerman was one of the few players on the team with previous postseason experience. He appeared in two games for Minnesota in the 1965 World Series and, in his only Fall Classic at bat, ended Game 3 by bouncing into a double play against Claude Osteen. The Twins lost to the Los Angeles Dodgers in seven games.

In 1967, Zimmerman played in 104 games as Battey was troubled by health issues; his 6921/3 innings caught were tops on the team that season. In addition to his service as an active player, Zimmerman also functioned as the club's unofficial bullpen coach, as the Twins only employed three full-time coaches in 1967. The season featured a furious, four-team pennant race that went down to the campaign's final weekend. Minnesota was in the league lead with two games left, but the club lost its final two games to the Red Sox and finished the season tied with the Detroit Tigers for second place. After Battey's release in the off-season, the Twins traded for catcher John Roseboro, and Zimmerman went back to being a reserve player during the 1968 season. He was released by the Twins on March 18, 1969.

=== Career statistics ===
In an eight-year major league career, Zimmerman played in 483 games, accumulating 203 hits in 994 at bats for a .204 career batting average along with 3 home runs and 72 runs batted in. Although he was a light-hitting player, Zimmerman was a good defensive catcher, leading the American League in 1965 with a .997 fielding percentage and had a career fielding percentage of .991.

== Coaching career ==
Zimmerman's coaching career began in earnest in March 1969 when Gene Mauch named him the bullpen coach of the expansion Montreal Expos, then in their first season. He worked as a member of Mauch's staff for the next dozen years, from 1969 to 1975 with Montreal, then with the Twins from 1976 to 1980.

He umpired a game on August 25, 1978, in Toronto during an umpires' strike. Zimmerman and Don Leppert, his counterpart with the Blue Jays as a coach-umpire, are the last two active coaches to umpire a Major League game. He then scouted for the Yankees and Orioles during the 1980s.

Jerry Zimmerman died in Neskowin, Oregon, from a heart attack at the age of 63.
