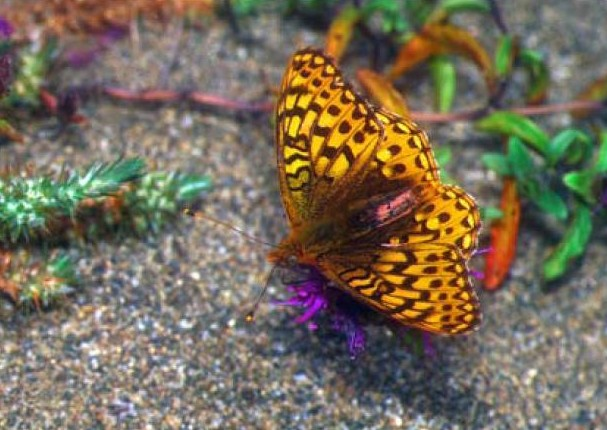

Conservation status
- Endangered (ESA)

Scientific classification
- Domain: Eukaryota
- Kingdom: Animalia
- Phylum: Arthropoda
- Class: Insecta
- Order: Lepidoptera
- Family: Nymphalidae
- Genus: Speyeria
- Species: S. zerene
- Subspecies: S. z. myrtleae

Trinomial name
- Speyeria zerene myrtleae Dos Passos & Grey, 1945

= Myrtle's silverspot =

Subspecies of butterfly

Myrtle's silverspot (Speyeria zerene myrtleae) is a medium-sized butterfly in the brush foot family (Nymphalidae), an endangered subspecies of the zerene fritillary. It is endemic to California, where it is known from only about four locations just north of the San Francisco Bay Area, including two at Point Reyes National Seashore. Its wingspan is approximately 2.2 inches (56 mm). The upper surfaces of the wings are golden brown with numerous black spots and lines. The undersides are brown, orange and tan with black lines and silver and black spots. Larvae are dark colored with many sharp branching spines on their backs. Myrtle's silverspot is larger and paler than the closely related Behrens' silverspot (Speyeria zerene behrensii), which is now limited to the vicinity of Point Arena in Mendocino County. Myrtle's silverspot is also closely related to the Oregon silverspot (Speyeria zerene hippolyta).

The female lays a single brood of eggs in the dried herbage of violets, especially western dog violet (Viola adunca), the only known larval food plant. Upon hatching, the caterpillars wander a short distance and spin silk pads upon which they pass the winter. The larvae immediately seek out the food plant at the end of their diapause in the spring. After 7 to 10 weeks each larva pupates within a chamber of leaves it glued together with silk. Adults may emerge in about 2 weeks and can live for 3 weeks. The adult flight season may range from late June to early September. Adults feed on nectar from flowers including gumplants (Grindelia spp.), yellow sand verbena (Abronia latifolia), coyote mints (Monardella spp., especially M. undulata), bull thistle (Cirsium vulgare) and seaside daisy (Erigeron glaucus).

== Habitat ==
Myrtle's silverspot is found in sand dune and coastal prairie habitat. Populations were formerly found in dunes and bluffs from San Mateo County north to the mouth of the Russian River in Sonoma County. The populations south of the Golden Gate apparently have been extirpated by urban development. Four populations are known to inhabit coastal terrace prairie, coastal bluff scrub, and associated non-native grassland habitats in western Marin and southwestern Sonoma counties, including Point Reyes. Adult butterflies are typically found in areas that are sheltered from the wind, below 820 feet (250 m) elevation, and within 3 miles (4.8 km) of the coast.

== Conservation ==
The butterfly was listed as an endangered species in 1992. Habitat loss due to residential and commercial land development has extirpated these butterflies from parts of their range and may threaten some of the remaining populations. Maintaining larval and nectar plants is critical for conservation of these butterflies. Changes in natural fire patterns, introduction of exotic plants, and successional changes in the plant community have reduced the availability of host plants. Either excessive or inadequate grazing activity can result in plant communities unfavorable to the butterflies. Measures for habitat improvement may include eradication of invasive exotics such as iceplant (Mesembryanthemum spp.) and identifying appropriate grazing and/or burning regimes in grassland and scrub areas. These butterflies are highly prized by insect collectors, and are vulnerable due to their small population. Silverspot butterfly larvae are also extremely sensitive to pesticides.
