= Lake Washington sunken forests =

Submerged forest in Washington state, USA

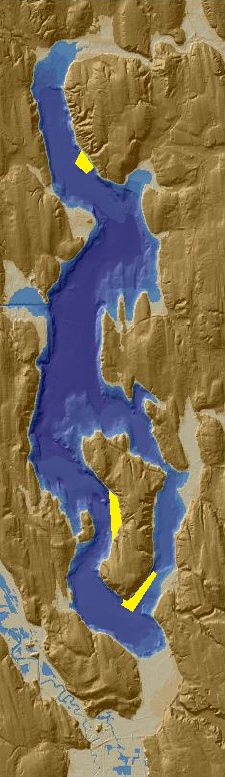
Sunken forests highlighted in yellow in Lake Washington off Kirkland (top) and Mercer Island (bottom)

The Lake Washington sunken forests were both a part of the scientific discovery of a major fault line under Seattle, Washington, and part of a timber piracy case in the late 20th century. In a precedent-setting case, the Washington State Supreme Court decided that ancient drowned forests are state property and not eligible for salvage.

== Creation of the sunken forests ==
A major earthquake (magnitude 7 to 7.5) occurred on the Seattle Fault about 900 C.E., creating multiple forms of evidence that led to the discovery of the fault and its description in Science in 1992. One of the forms of evidence was landslides at three locations around Lake Washington: off the southeast corner of Mercer Island (47°31′30″N 122°13′15″W), on the west side of the island across from Seattle's Seward Park (47°33′45″N 122°14′00″W), and one near Saint Edward State Park in present-day Kirkland, Washington (47°42′30″N 122°15′15″W).

The landslides on heavily wooded land created "bizarre submerged forests" of old-growth timber, preserved by the cool water and low oxygen in the deep lake. These sunken forests were known to early European settlers of the Seattle area, for whom the snags could be a hazard to ships on the lake, and as early as 1919, nearly 200 of the sunken trees had been removed from depths of 65–132 feet (20–40 m). Radiocarbon dating and tree-ring dating of the wood in the late 20th century helped to establish the date of the earthquake.

== Natural resources case ==
In the early 1990s, Western Wood Lumber, owned by John Tortorelli, was conducting salvage logging operations on sunken logs in Lake Washington that were lost from early 20th century log booms. Tortorelli broke an underwater sewer line and during the investigation of this incident, it was found that he had been salvaging wood from the sunken forests. The state said he did not have a permit for this, and in 1994 charged him as a timber pirate, with the theft of over $150,000 worth of lumber. He was convicted in 1994 and appealed.

In a precedent-setting decision, the Washington State Supreme Court found that the underwater forests belonged to the State of Washington (administered by the Department of Natural Resources). The decision rested on a determination that the Federal Submerged Lands Act of 1953 applied to the underwater forests and not just traditional seabed or lakebed natural resources (molluscs, minerals etc.) as argued by the appellant.

== See also ==
- Ghost forest
