= Neskowin Beach State Recreation Site =

State park in Oregon, United States

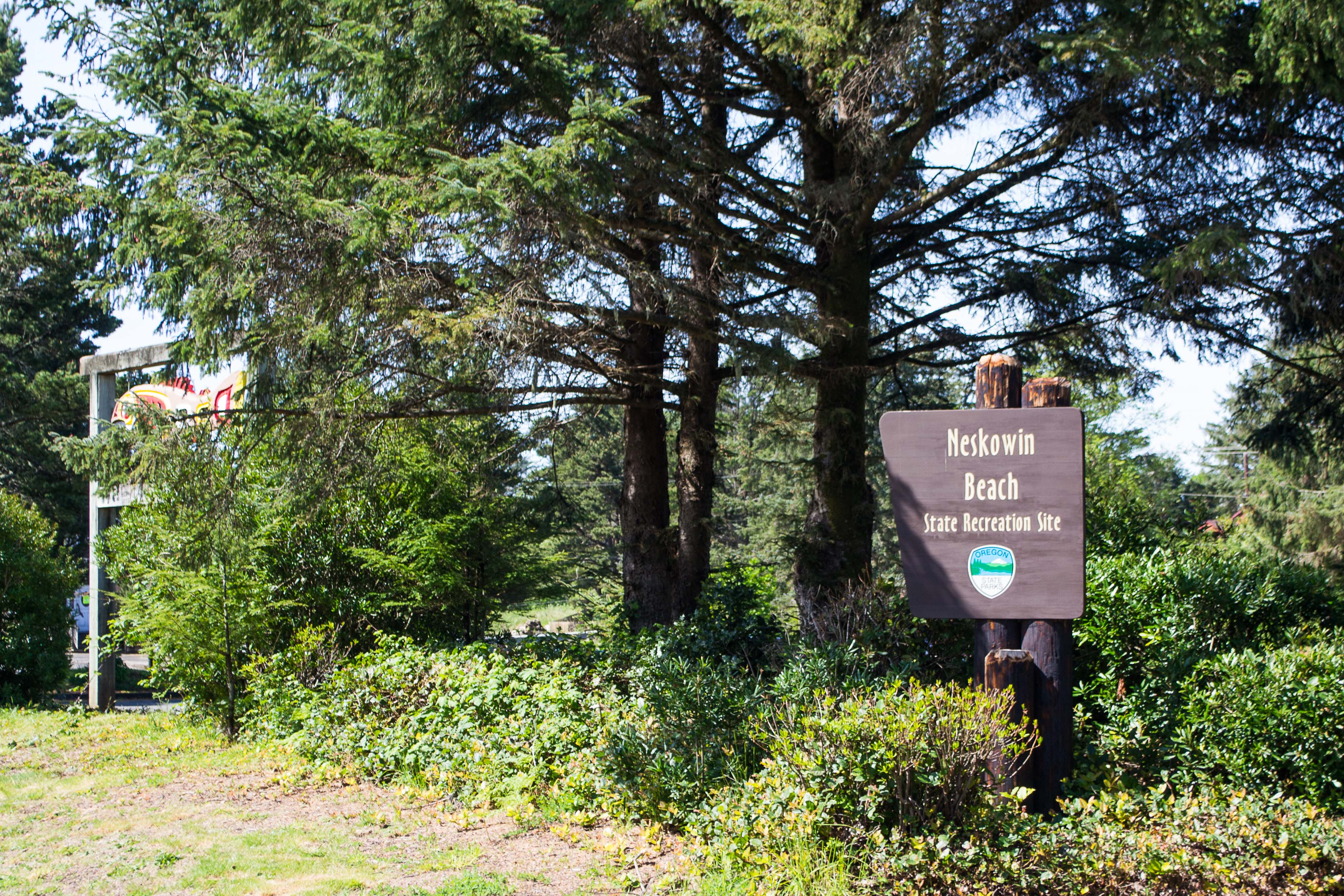

- Location within Oregon Location within the United States
- Type: Public, state
- Location: Tillamook County, Oregon
- Nearest city: Lincoln City
- Coordinates: 45°06′07″N 123°59′07″W
- Operator: Oregon Parks and Recreation Department

Neskowin Beach State Recreation Site is a state park in Tillamook County, Oregon, United States, administered by the Oregon Parks and Recreation Department.

== See also ==
- List of Oregon state parks
- Neskowin Ghost Forest
- Neskowin, Oregon
