= Neskowin Ghost Forest =

Remnants of a Sitka spruce forest on the Oregon Coast in the U.S.

Coordinates: 45.09773°N 123.98917°W

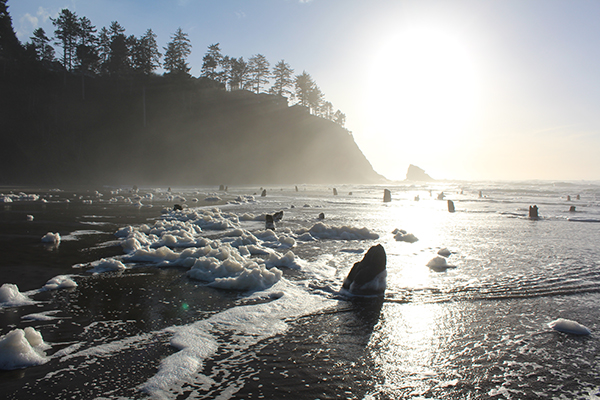
Stumps of trees at the Neskowin Ghost Forest

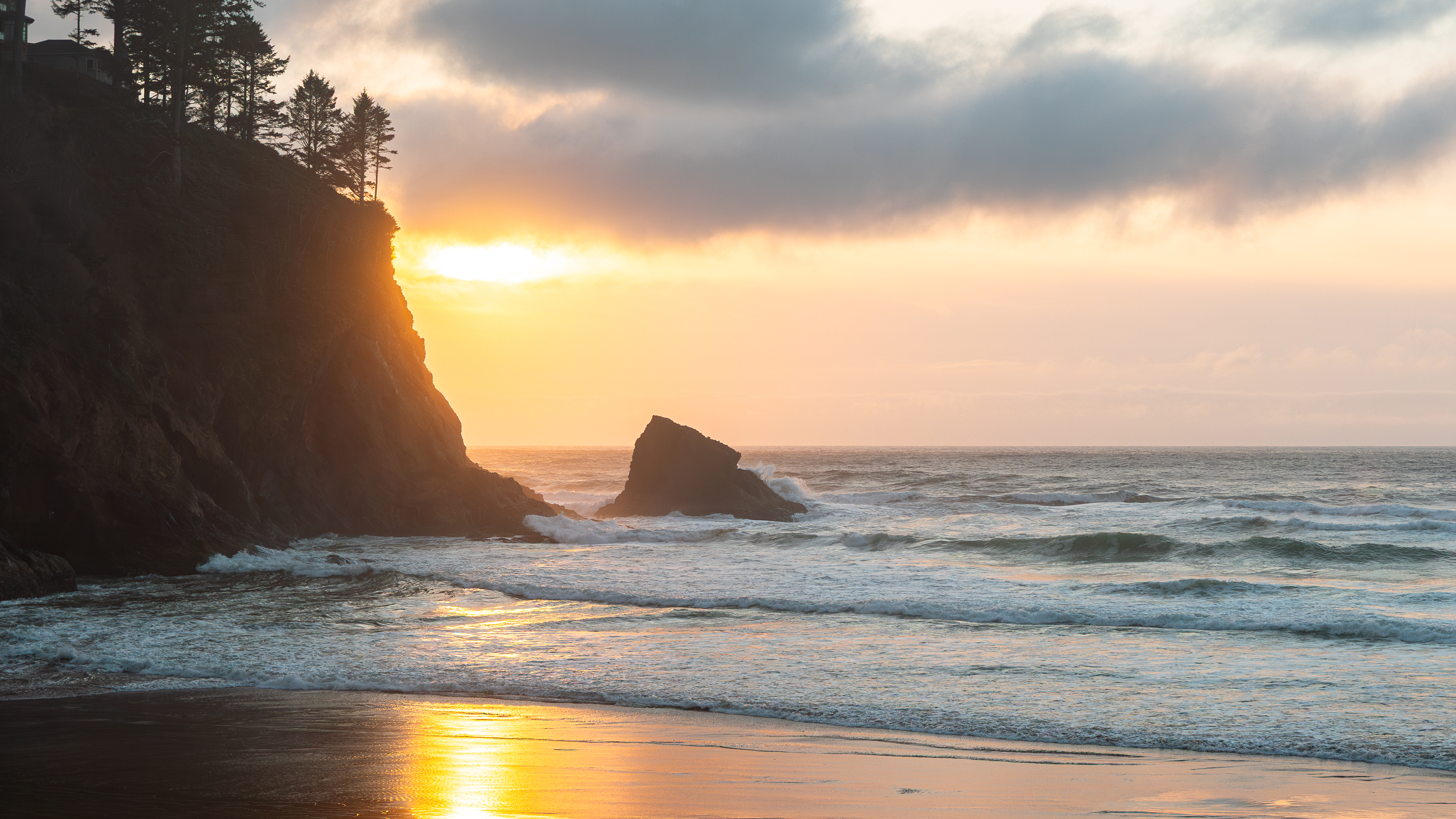
Neskowin Beach at winter sunset, 2026

The Neskowin Ghost Forest is the remnants of a Sitka spruce forest on the Oregon Coast of the United States. The stumps were likely created when an earthquake of the Cascadia subduction zone abruptly lowered the trees, that were then covered by mud from landslides or debris from a tsunami. However, some local geologists believe this ghost forest (and others on the Pacific NW coast) were caused by gradual dune encroachment – meaning sand dunes built up and covered the Sitka trees – not in an abrupt drop. Many of the stumps are over 2,000 years old, preserved by the salt water, which does not favor lignin-decomposing fungus.

== History ==
The stumps were unearthed when turbulent storms swept away sand during the winter of 1997–1998. It is one of over thirty ghost forests along the Oregon and Washington Coast, though many appear as flat roots and not stumps. Most notably, Washington's ghost forest of red cedars was integral to the discovery of the Cascadia fault line. These ghost forests are evidence of significant, rapid changes in coastline – often due to seismic events such as the 1700 Cascadia earthquake.

The stumps at Neskowin are 2,000 years old, according to carbon dating. While living, the trees that make up the Neskowin Ghost Forest were similar to present-day coastal rain forest. They stood 150–200 feet (46–61 m) high and were at least 200 years old when buried. However, it's difficult to determine when or how the trees died, because it occurred before written history in the region. It was originally believed that these trees died slowly, as the roots were gradually submerged in saltwater due to changes in the sea levels. Yet research by geologists revealed that the soil, still present at the roots of the stumps, was buried abruptly – indicating a more sudden and dramatic event, like an earthquake, as the cause.

The ghost forest is near Proposal Rock. It is part of the Neskowin Beach State Recreation Site. The best time to see the stumps is low tide, during winter, as winter storms lower the sand. January, February and March have the lowest tides of the year.

== Gallery ==
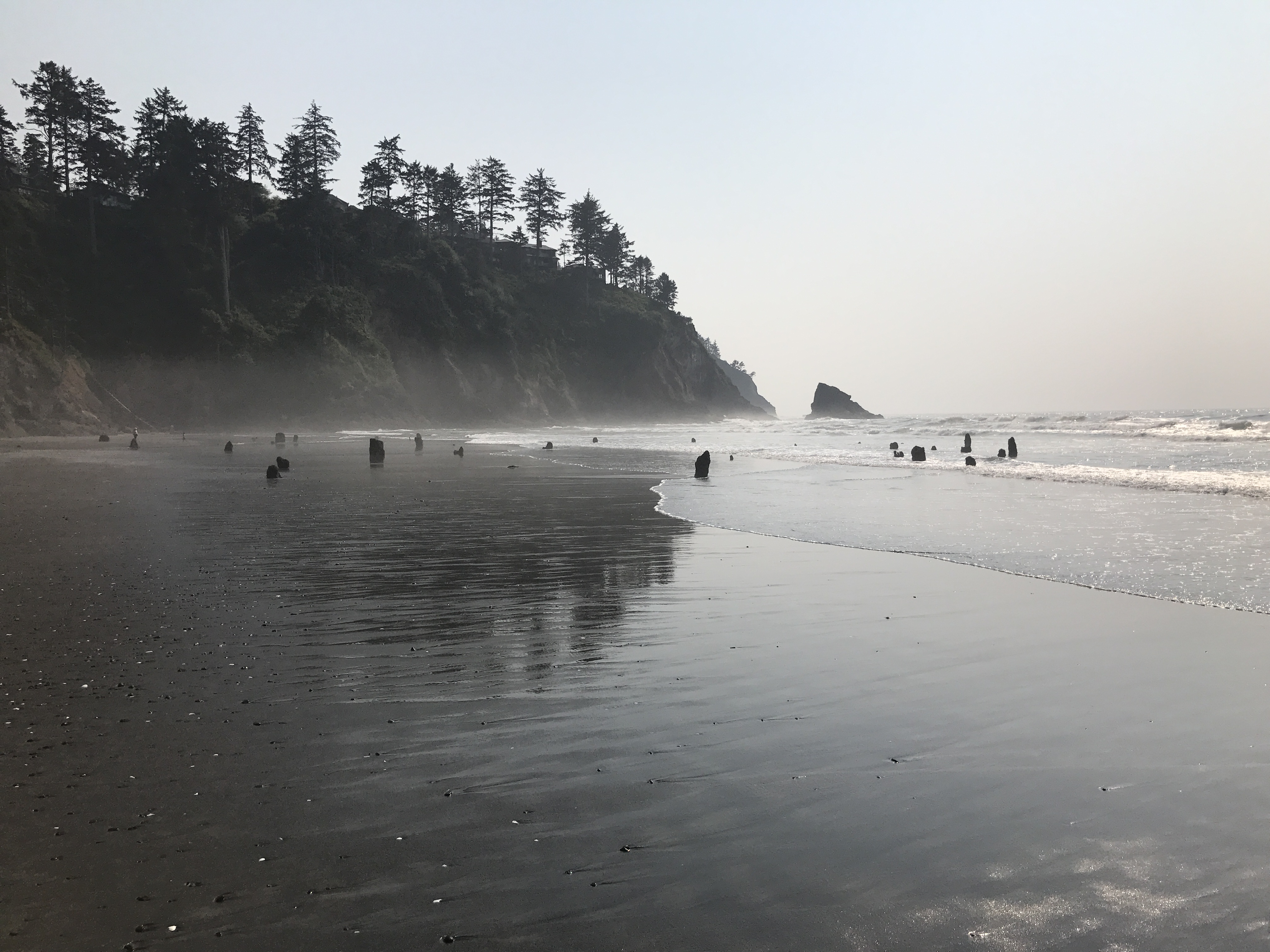
Neskowin Ghost Forest in August 2017

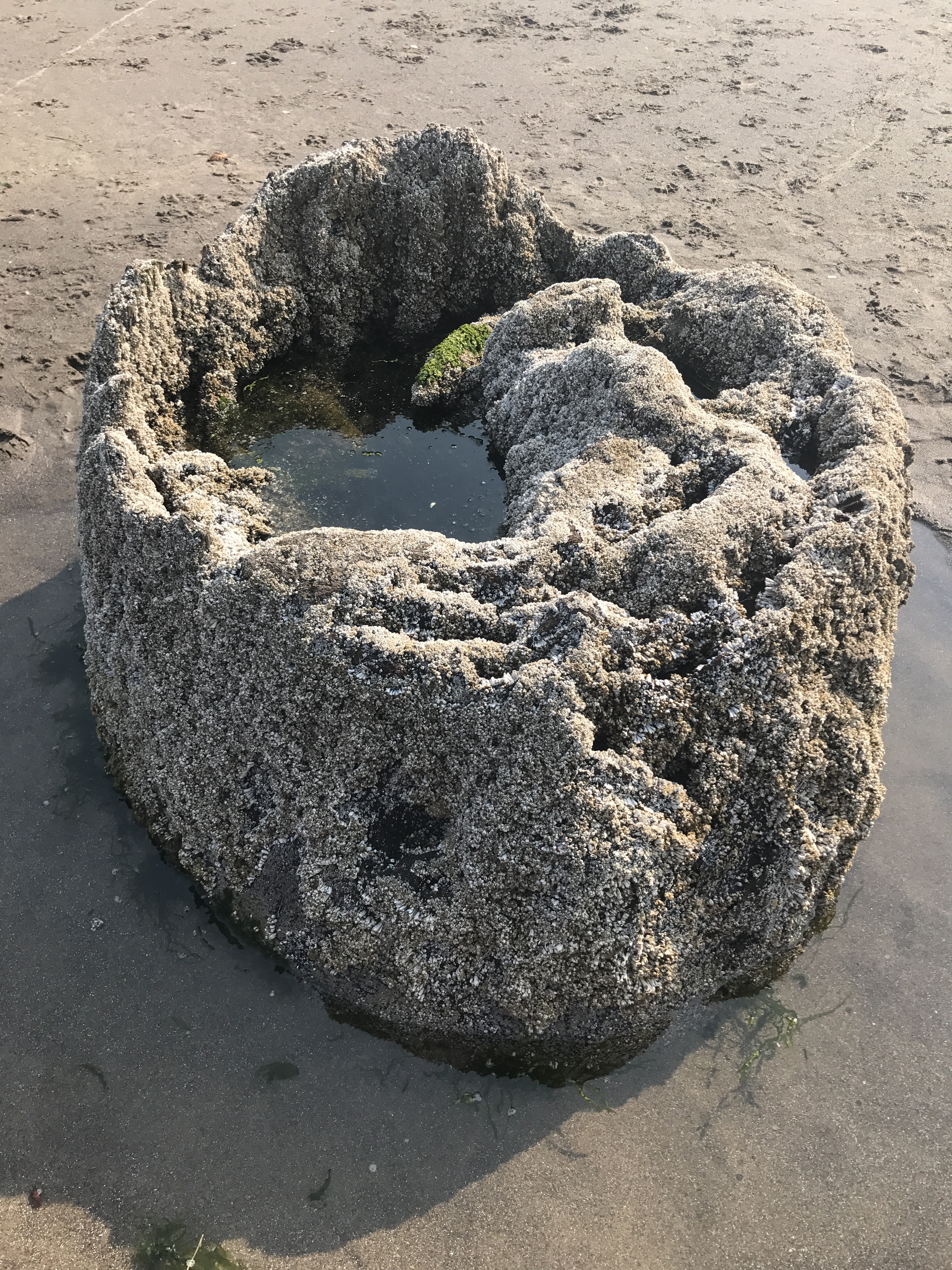
Large tree stump protruding from beach sand

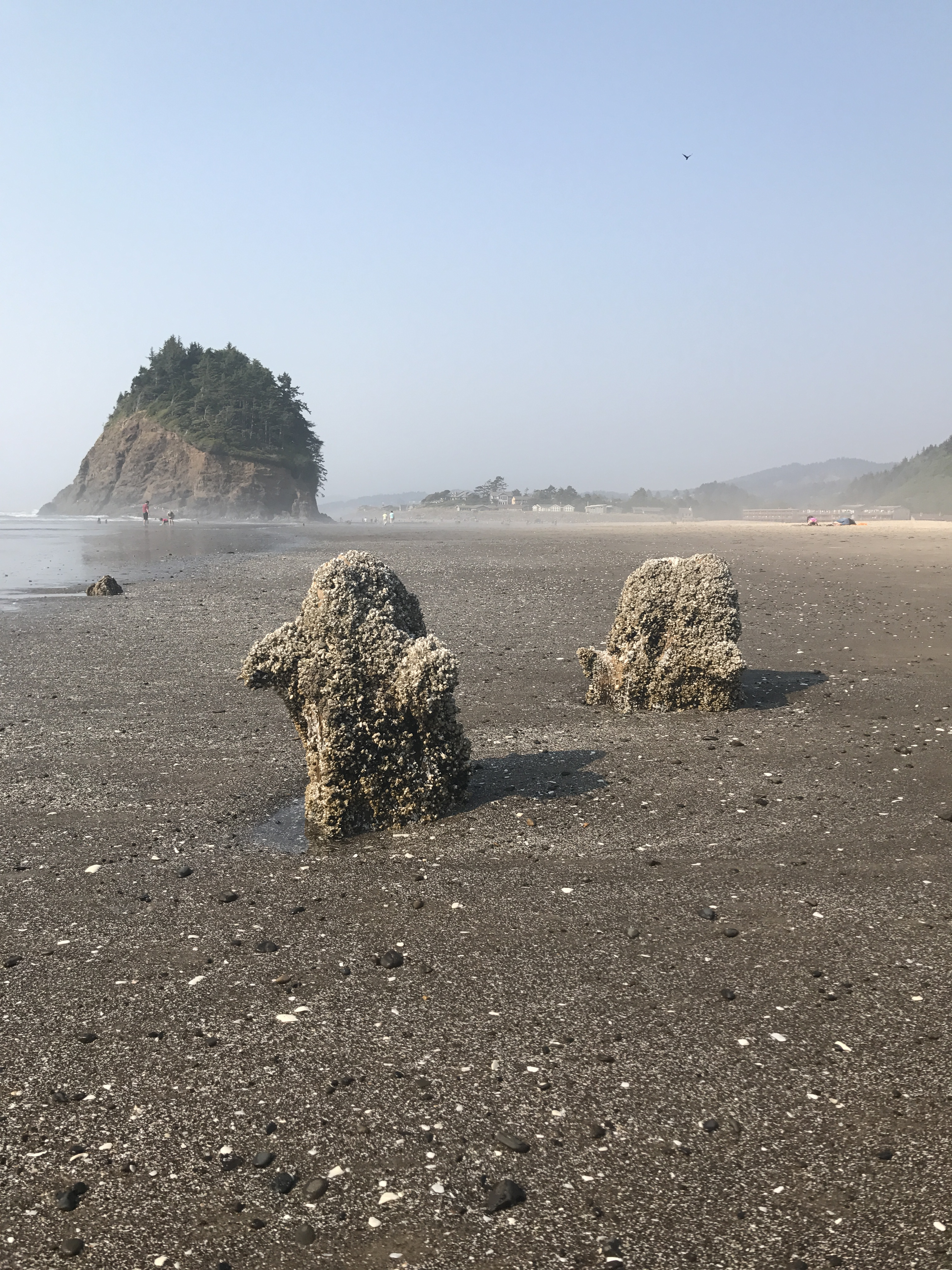
Tree stumps visible with Proposal Rock in background.
