= Ghost forest =

Areas of dead trees in former forests

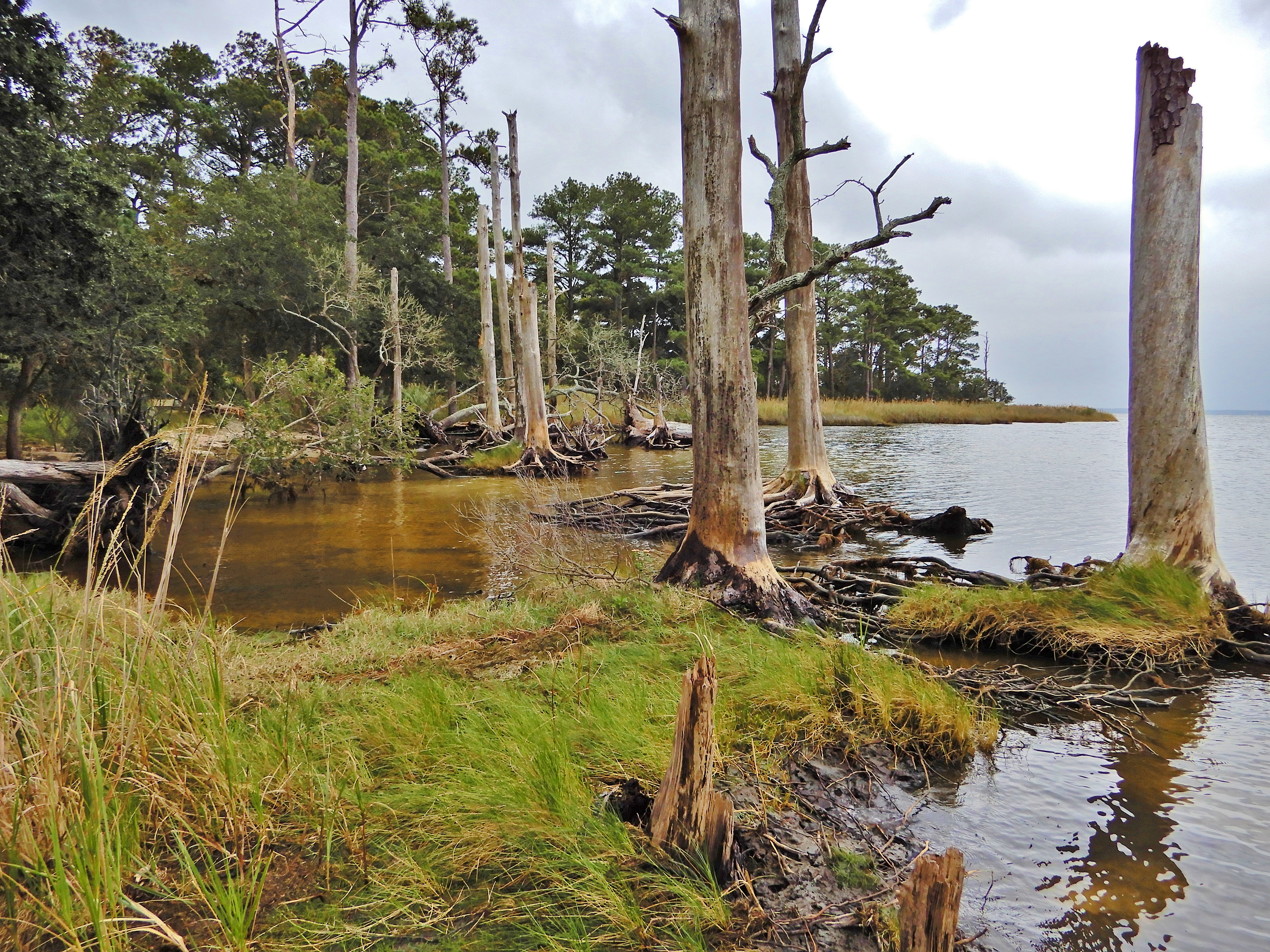
Ghost forest in the Nags Head Woods ecological preserve, North Carolina.

A ghost forest is a coastal woodland characterized by widespread tree mortality as a result of saltwater intrusion and land submergence. Ghost forests commonly form when sea level rise, tectonic subsidence, or storm-driven coastal flooding increases soil salinity beyond the tolerance of freshwater tree species. The formation of ghost forests changes the surrounding ecology, often changing the deciduous forests into saltwater marshes or tidal wetlands. The expansion of ghost forests has been documented in multiple coastal regions and is associated with climate change-driven sea level rise, intense weather events, and altered hydrological conditions.

== Causes ==
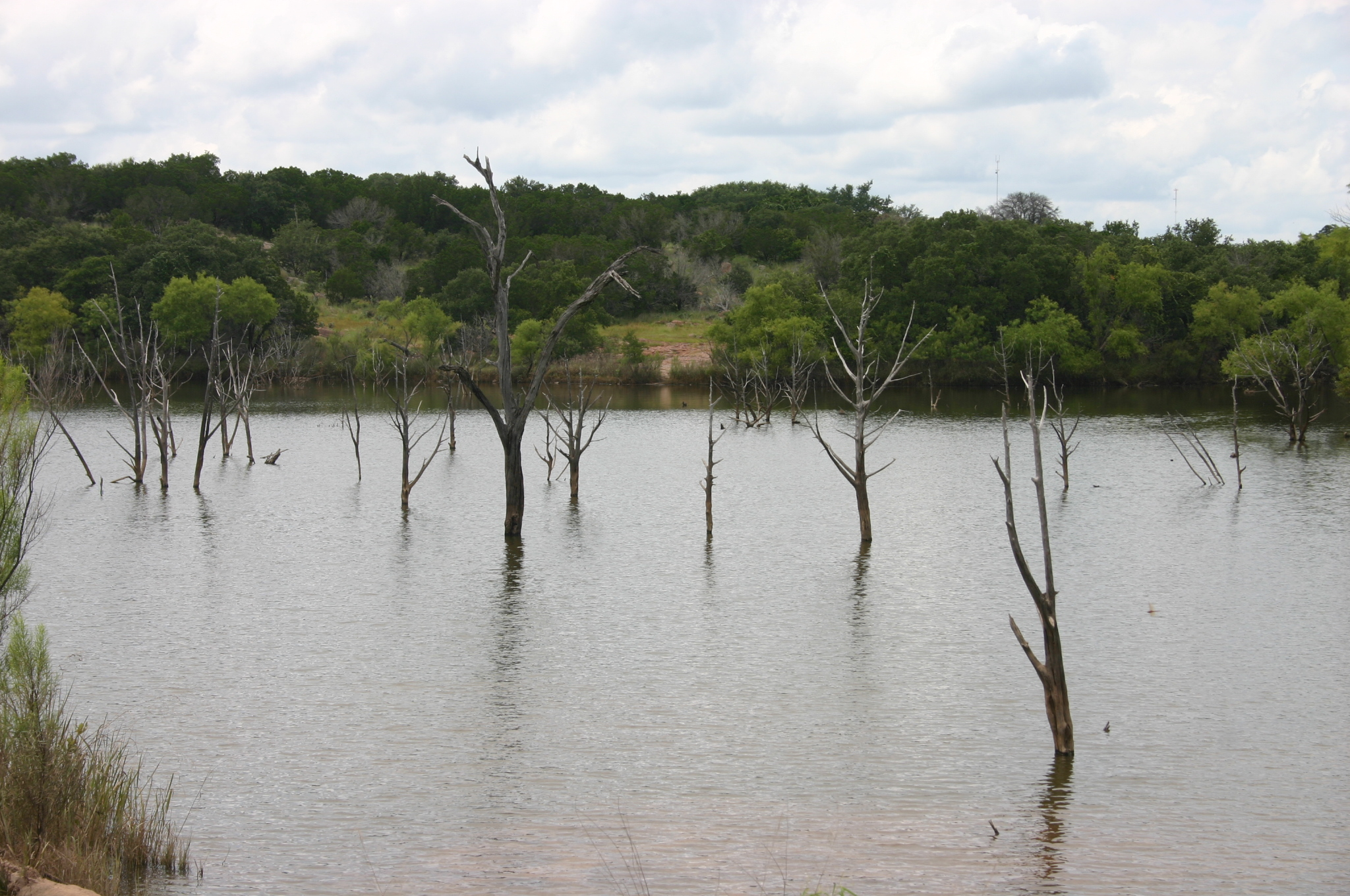
Forest immersed in water at Inks Lake State Park, Texas, USA.

The formation of ghost forests primarily occurs by saltwater intrusion, or SWI. Intrusion may occur through surface inundation or through the movement of saline groundwater, moving up to the soil layer, increasing salinity levels and stressing vegetation.

=== Sea level changes ===
One avenue for top-down saltwater intrusion is sea level rise due to climate change. As sea levels rise, storm surges can reach further inland, inducing saltwater encroachment. Sea level increase also means potential flooding of seawater onto land.

=== Tectonic activity ===
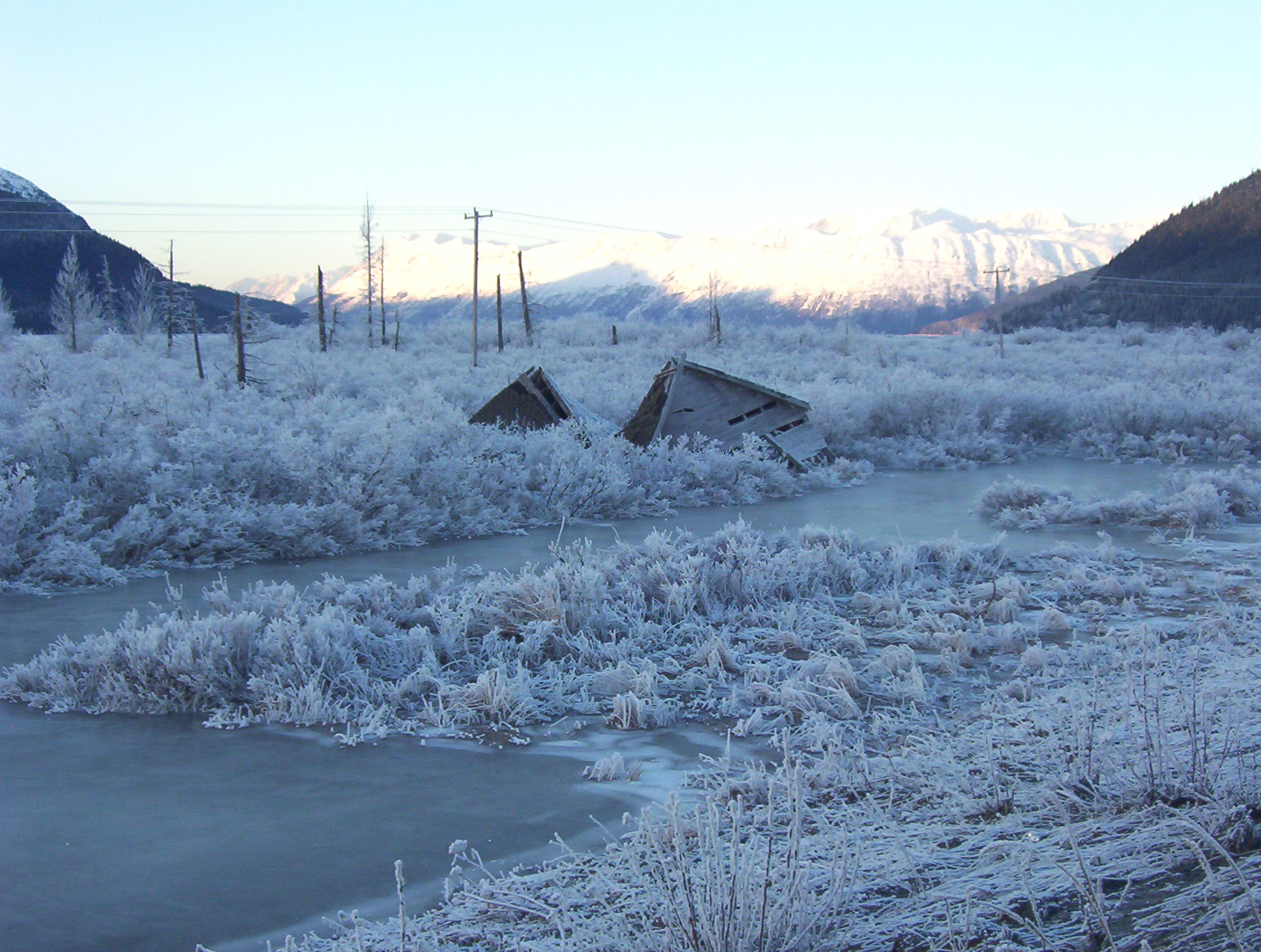
Ghost forest in winter, at the former site of Portage, Alaska, which was destroyed by the 1964 Alaska earthquake.

Ghost forests can also result from tectonic activity. Earthquakes along fault lines can cause a phenomenon known as subsidence. In coastal regions, subsidence causes once elevated coastline to drop down several meters to at or below sea level. Here, sea level has not changed, but the coastline has been deformed, making it susceptible to tides and seawater encroachment. Areas of the coastline can then be inundated with sea water, creating marshes and leaving behind ghost forests. This is another example of top-down saltwater intrusion.

=== Tsunamis ===
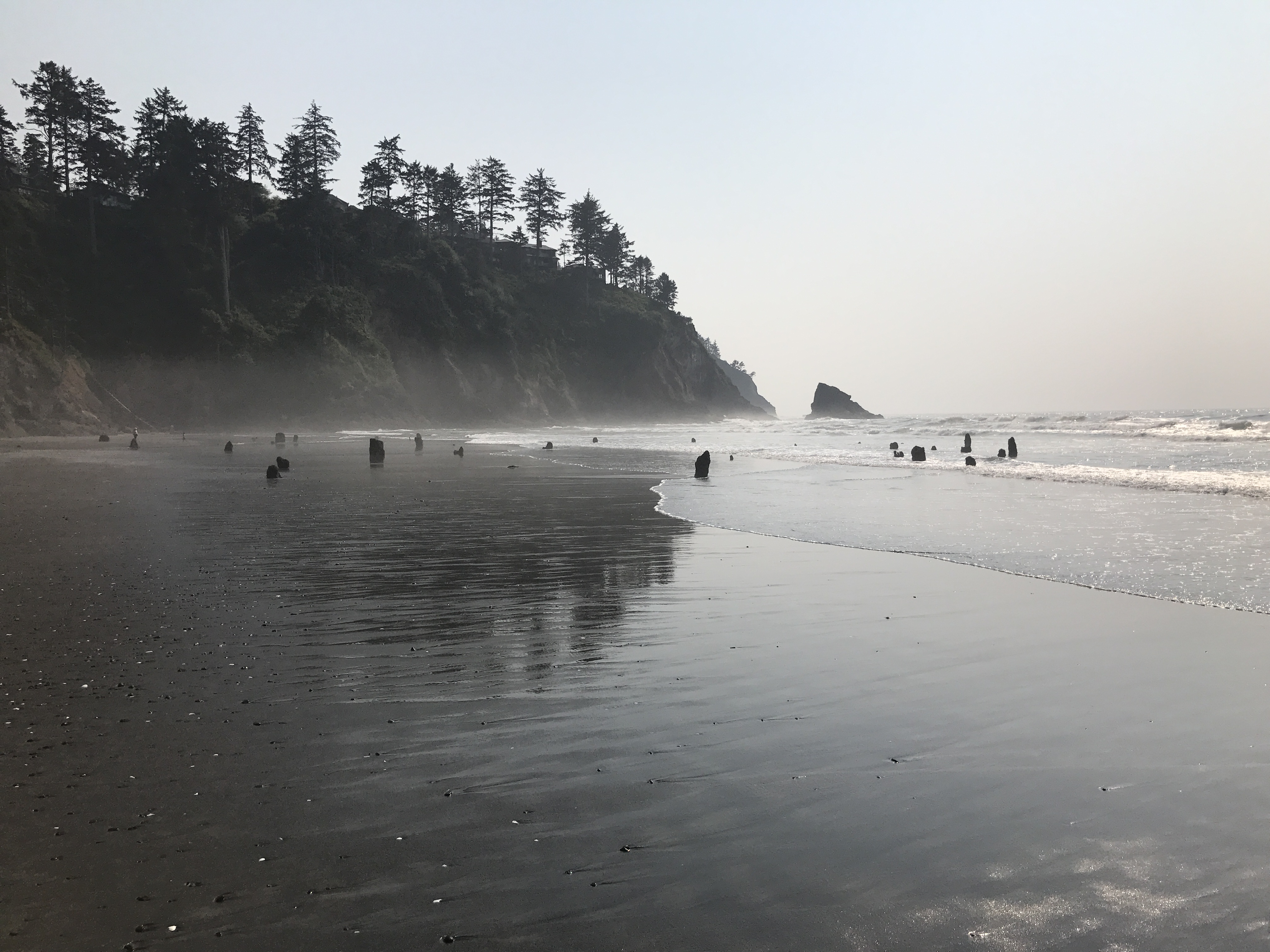
Neskowin Ghost Forest.

In addition to subsidence, large earthquakes can also cause tsunamis, introducing large volumes of saltwater to the coastline and killing coastal forests.

== Mechanisms ==
Coastal tree mortality that is associated with ghost forests occurs due to interacting physiological stressors. Increased soil salinity causes osmotic stress, reducing, or in some instances completely preventing roots from absorbing water. High concentrations of saline water in the soil layer also causes ion toxicity from accumulation of sodium and chlorine, damaging root cells. Reduced root water and oxygen intake can lead to hypoxia, disrupting the hydraulic transport systems within the tree, damaging the crown and reducing photosynthetic capacity. This may result in carbon starvation and eventual tree mortality.

== Ecology ==
Ghost forests have been observed to change the surrounding ecology. Coastal forests act as carbon sinks and prevent it from entering the atmosphere. The death of these trees due to encroaching seawater and the deaths of these forests mean that the coast loses these carbon sinks, leading to potentially more carbon entering the atmosphere. Research suggests that the transition from coastal forests into salt marshes decreases the aboveground carbon (that being carbon stored in tree trunks, leaves, etc.) in the surrounding areas.

Some research has found that the biogeochemical properties of ghost forests differ from coastal woodland forests and saltwater marshes in that they do not behave as intermediary ecosystems and instead exhibit their own unique properties of dissolved organic carbon, greenhouse gas exchange, and microbial community composition. This indicates that ghost forests may have unique ecosystems separate from either ecological states.

While the formation of ghost forests reduces carbon storage and forest habitat, ghost forests create saltwater marshes, providing new habitat for marine life and coastal birds. Saltwater marshes may also provide protection from coastal storms and flooding, acting as breakwaters.

== Distribution ==
Ghost forests have been documented in low-lying coastal woodlands, most commonly along the U.S. and Canadian Atlantic coasts in areas such as North Carolina, New Brunswick, Florida, Georgia, and Louisiana. Similar coastal forest dieback has been reported in the Pacific Northwest region of the United States.

== Examples ==
- Lake Washington sunken forests
- Neskowin Ghost Forest
- Pett § Sunken forest
- Sunken Forests of New Hampshire
- Goose Creek State Park in North Carolina
- The Chesapeake Bay

== See also ==
- Petrified wood § Occurrences — trees preserved through mineralization in death (though not necessarily due to salinity), sometimes in large stands
