= Proposal Rock (Oregon) =

Island off the coast of Oregon, USA

Coordinates: 45.1015°N 123.9876°W

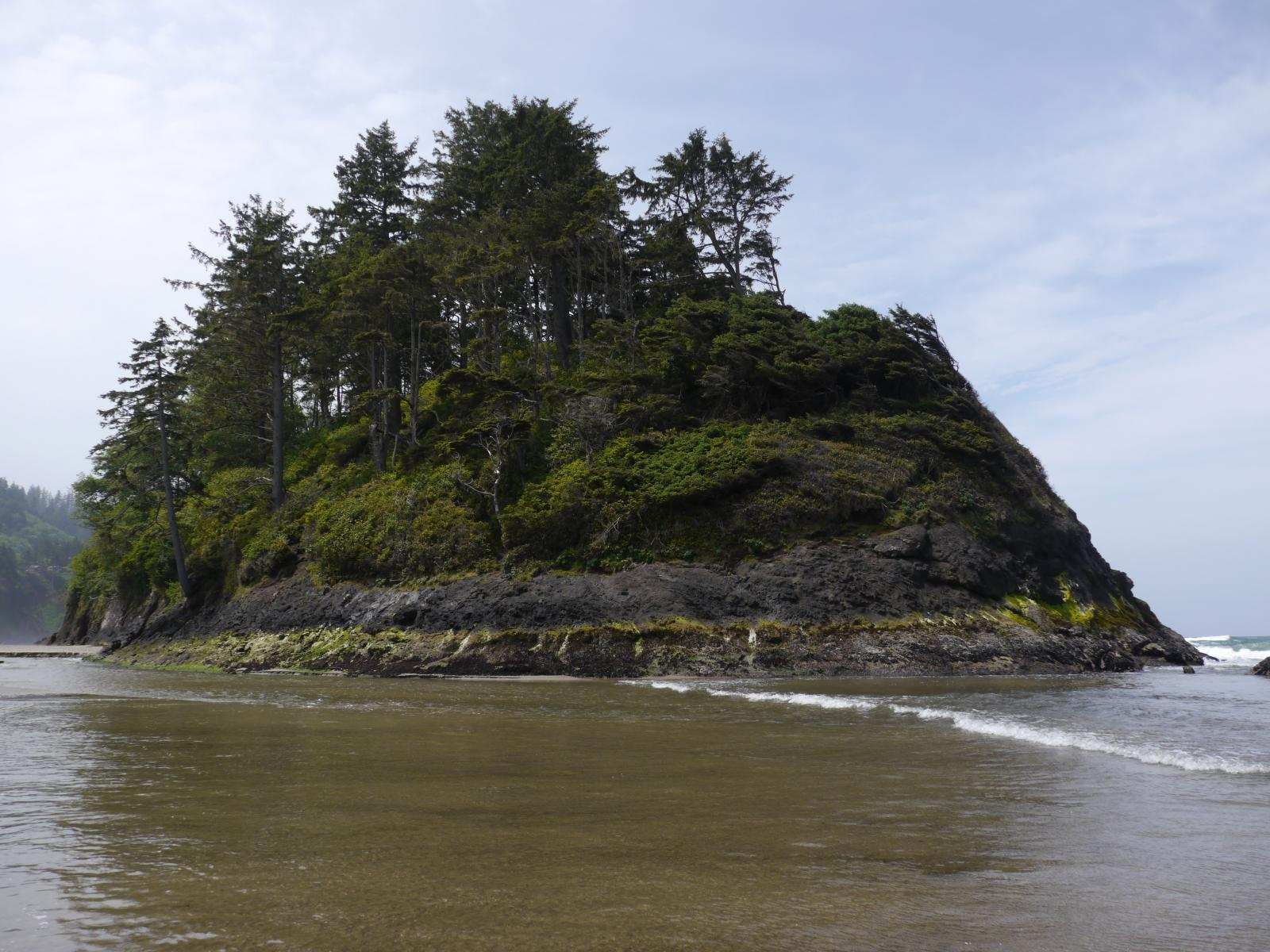
Proposal Rock

Proposal Rock is an island off the coast of the U.S. state of Oregon, in Tillamook County, near the community of Neskowin. The island is named for a local legend of a sea captain taking his beloved there to propose to her. The proposal was from Charley Gage to Della Page sometime around 1900. Della's mother, Sarah, then dubbed it Proposal Rock to mark the occasion.

Proposal Rock was originally called “Schlock” by the Native Americans who first lived there.

== See also ==
- Neskowin Ghost Forest
