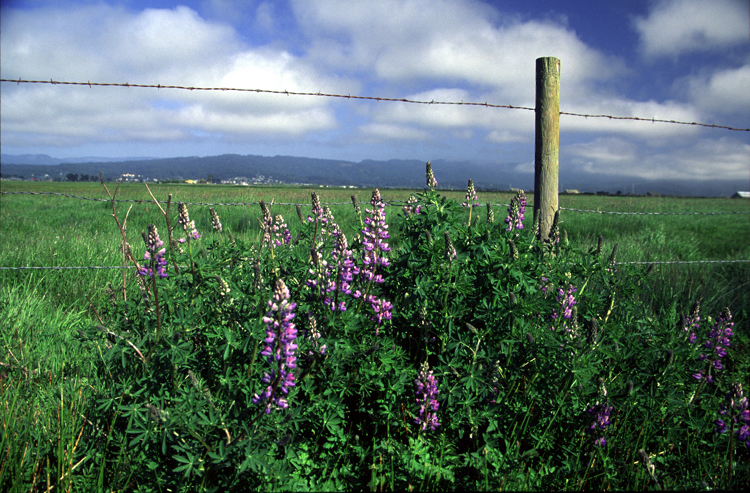

Scientific classification
- Kingdom: Plantae
- Clade: Embryophytes
- Clade: Tracheophytes
- Clade: Spermatophytes
- Clade: Angiosperms
- Clade: Eudicots
- Clade: Rosids
- Order: Fabales
- Family: Fabaceae
- Subfamily: Faboideae
- Genus: Lupinus
- Species: L. rivularis

Binomial name
- Lupinus rivularis Dougl. ex Lindl.

= Lupinus rivularis =

Species of plant

Lupinus rivularis is a species of lupine known by the common name riverbank lupine native to North America. It is also commonly known as river lupine, streambank lupine, and stream lupine.

== Distribution ==
Lupinus rivularis is found in western North America, from southern British Columbia to northern California. Specifically, it is native to California, Oregon, Washington, and British Columbia. It mainly exists from coastal habitat in places such as both Olympic and Redwood National Parks, and at Point Reyes National Seashore. Its development in these regions is driven by its preference for sandy, well-drained, and low nitrogenous soils, along with precipitation levels between 20 and 100 inches. Additionally, this species observes optimal growth in environments with full sunlight. Riverbank lupine is able to well establish a population where there is reduced competition, making it an excellent pioneer species for disturbed environments.

== Description ==
This is a robust, erect perennial herb or subshrub growing up to about a meter tall. The long taproot enables its growth in dry soil environments that are typical of disturbed botanical environments. The mostly hairless stem is thick, hollow, and reddish in color. Each alternate, palmately compound leaf is made up of 5 to 9 wide leaflets 2–4 centimetres (0.79–1.57 in) long. The inflorescence is a raceme of many flowers sometimes arranged in whorls. The flower is light purple in color, often with white parts or shading. The fruit is a somewhat hairy legume pod up to 7 centimetres (2.8 in) long which turns dark as it ages. The seed pods house 6–10 seeds and are coated in sparsely distributed hairs. Riverbank lupine also has a distinct aroma that stimulates the attraction of its pollinators. The bloom occurs from March to July, lasting approximately two to four weeks.

== Conservation status ==
In British Columbia, riverbank lupine is considered endangered due to genetic breeding with other lupine species, loss of habitat, predation, pesticide use, and a multitude of other factors. However, its distribution is fairly stable throughout the rest of its range.

== Uses ==
Riverbank lupine has a range of important applications and uses, such as erosion control, food for wildlife, ornamental decorations, medicinal usage, and cover crops. As a pioneer species, it is capable of mass growth, thus is ideal for renewal of sites that have undergone erosion. This is enabled through their nitrogen fixation abilities, which makes them very effective at promoting revegetation and reforestation. The seeds produced by riverbank lupine serve as a food source for many birds, while other species rely on the abundant vegetation as a site of cover. Additionally, the low alkaloid content in riverbank lupine makes it suitable for livestock grazing. The showy nature of the floral arrangement makes riverbank lupine ideal for ornamental display in certain environmental landscapes. Lastly, the Nlakaʼpamux of British Columbia reportedly utilized riverbank lupine in a variety of medicinal applications.
