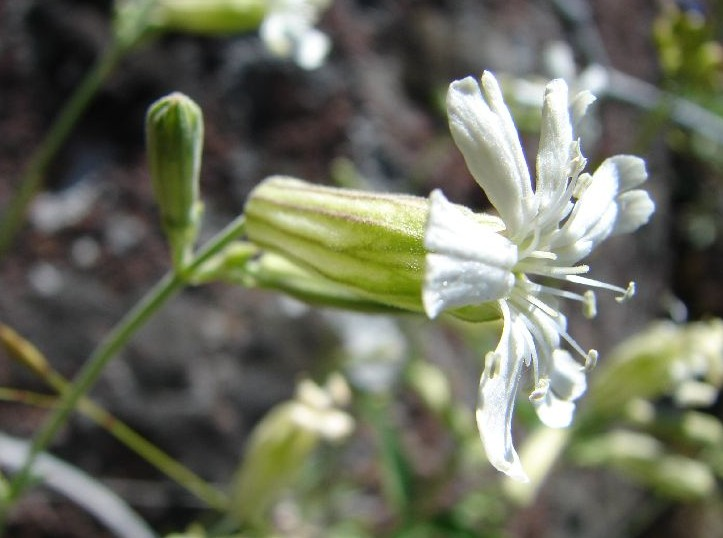

Scientific classification
- Kingdom: Plantae
- Clade: Tracheophytes
- Clade: Angiosperms
- Clade: Eudicots
- Order: Caryophyllales
- Family: Caryophyllaceae
- Genus: Silene
- Species: S. douglasii

Binomial name
- Silene douglasii Hook.

= Silene douglasii =

Species of flowering plant

Silene douglasii is a species of flowering plant in the family Caryophyllaceae known by the common name Douglas's catchfly.

It is native to western North America from British Columbia to California to Wyoming, where it grows in several habitat types, including forests, woodlands, and coastal scrub.

== Description ==
Silene douglasii is a tufted perennial herb growing from a branching caudex and taproot, its stems decumbent to upright and up to 70 centimeters long. The stem is coated in curly or feltlike gray-white hairs. The lance-shaped leaves are up to 6 centimeters long on the lower stem and are smaller higher up.

Each flower is encapsulated in a cylindrical inflated calyx of sepals lined with ten green or purple-red veins. It is open at the tip, revealing five white, pink or purplish petals, each with two wide lobes at the tip.

=== Varieties ===
There are three varieties of this species.

- Silene douglasii var. douglasii
- Silene douglasii var. oraria — Seabluff catchfly, rare and endemic to the Oregon coastline.
- Silene douglasii var. rupinae
