= Neskowin, Oregon =

Unincorporated community in the state of Oregon, United States

- Census-designated place (CDP)
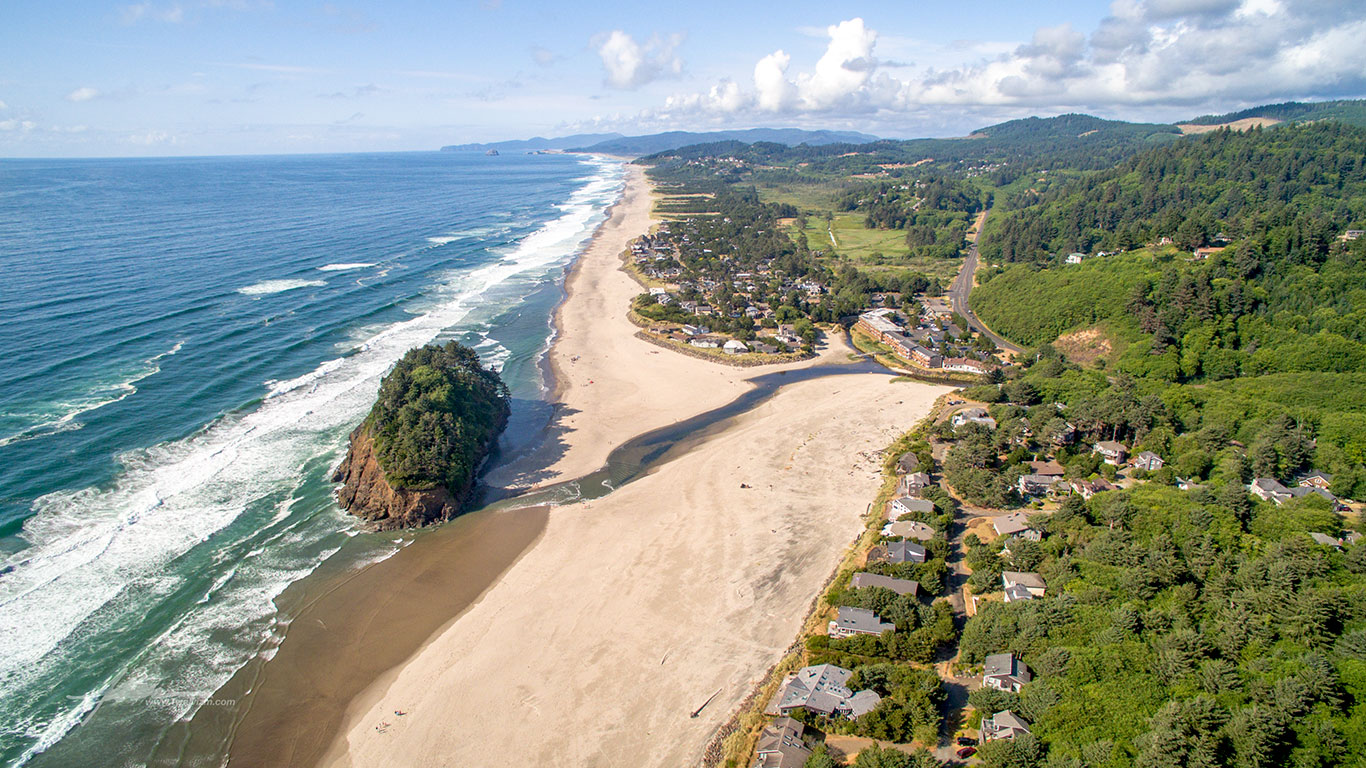
- Neskowin, featuring Proposal Rock

- Location of Neskowin, Oregon
- Coordinates: 45°07′15″N 123°58′34″W
- Country: United States
- State: Oregon
- County: Tillamook

Area
  - Total: 1.39 sq mi (3.60 km^{2})
  - Land: 1.39 sq mi (3.60 km^{2})
  - Water: 0 sq mi (0.00 km^{2})
- Elevation: 13 ft (4.0 m)

Population (2020)
  - Total: 205
  - Density: 147.4/sq mi (56.92/km^{2})
- Time zone: UTC-8 (Pacific (PST))
  - Summer (DST): UTC-7 (PDT)
- ZIP code: 97149
- Area code: 503
- FIPS code: 41-52000
- GNIS feature ID: 2408914

Neskowin (/ˈnɛskoʊ.ɪn/ nes-KOH-inn) is an unincorporated community in Tillamook County, Oregon, United States, along the Pacific Ocean between Cascade Head and Nestucca Bay. For statistical purposes, the United States Census Bureau has defined Neskowin as a census-designated place (CDP). The census definition of the area may not precisely correspond to local understanding of the area with the same name. As of the 2020 census, Neskowin had a population of 205.

== Geography ==
According to the United States Census Bureau, the CDP has a total area of 1.4 square miles (3.6 km^{2}), all of it land.

== Demographics ==
Historical population
Census	Pop.	Note	%±
2020	205		—
U.S. Decennial Census

As of the census of 2000, there were 169 people, 94 households, and 47 families residing in the CDP. The population density was 117.3 inhabitants per square mile (45.3/km^{2}). There were 408 housing units at an average density of 283.1 per square mile (109.3/km^{2}). The racial makeup of the CDP was 94.08% White, 3.55% Native American, 0.59% Asian, 0.59% from other races, and 1.18% from two or more races. Hispanic or Latino of any race were 2.37% of the population.

There were 94 households, out of which 11.7% had children under the age of 18 living with them, 44.7% were married couples living together, 4.3% had a female householder with no husband present, and 50.0% were non-families. 40.4% of all households were made up of individuals, and 16.0% had someone living alone who was 65 years of age or older. The average household size was 1.80 and the average family size was 2.32.

In the CDP, the population was spread out, with 8.9% under the age of 18, 2.4% from 18 to 24, 17.8% from 25 to 44, 44.4% from 45 to 64, and 26.6% who were 65 years of age or older. The median age was 54 years. For every 100 females, there were 85.7 males. For every 100 females age 18 and over, there were 83.3 males.

The median income for a household in the CDP was $42,000, and the median income for a family was $61,094. Males had a median income of $27,500 versus $61,250 for females. The per capita income for the CDP was $26,576. None of the families and 8.1% of the population were living below the poverty line, including no under eighteens and 15.8% of those over 64.

== Natural features ==
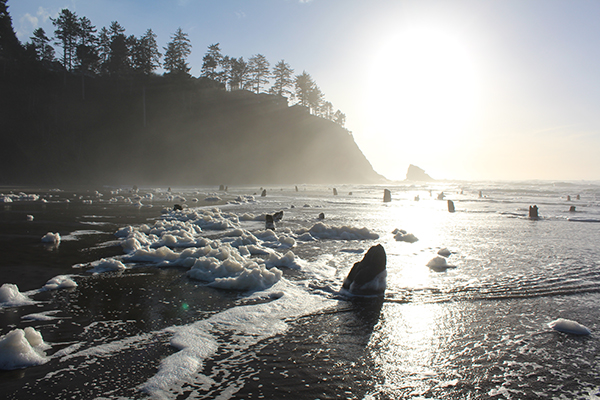
The Neskowin Ghost Forest in 2016

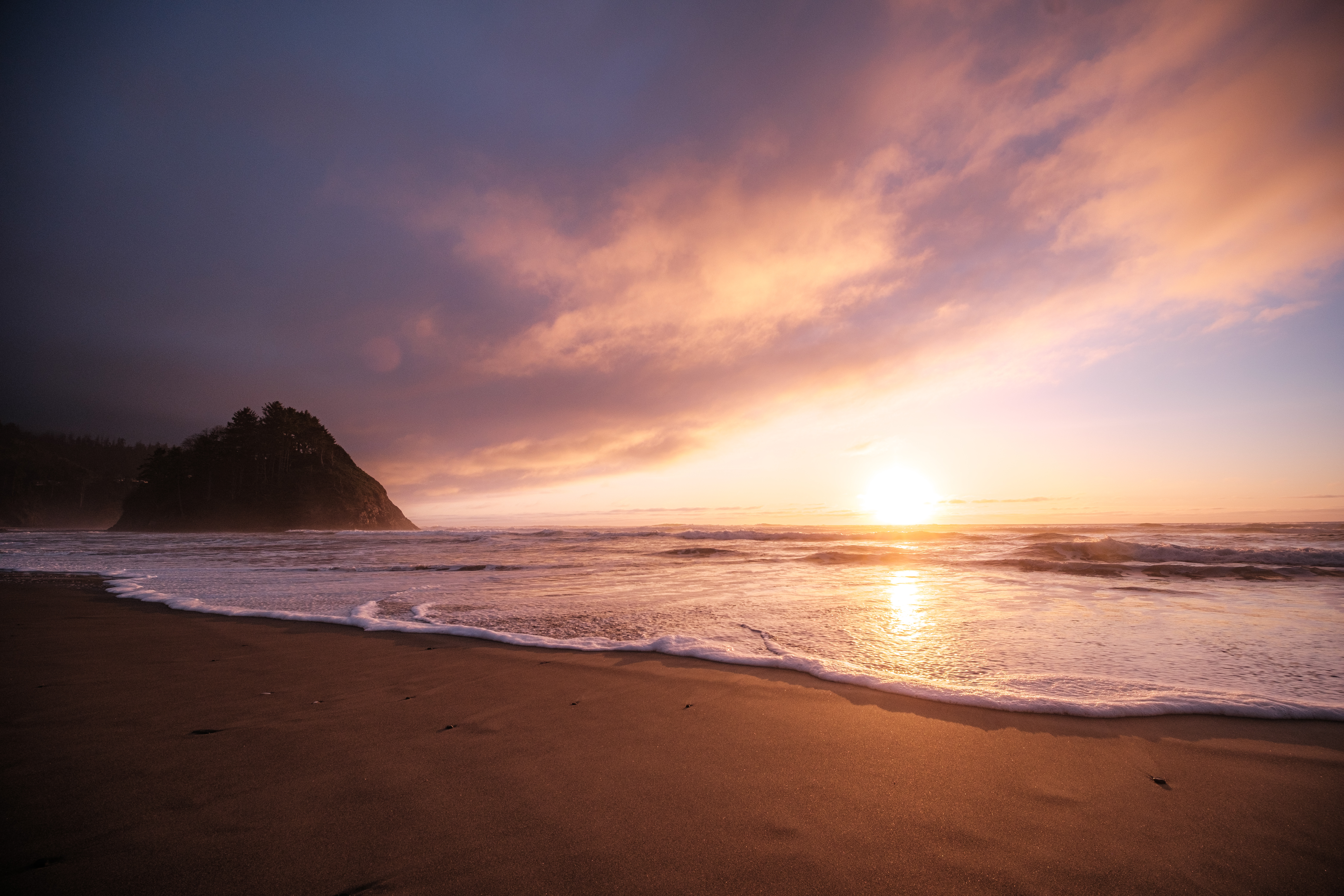
Neskowin Beach at Sunset in 2024

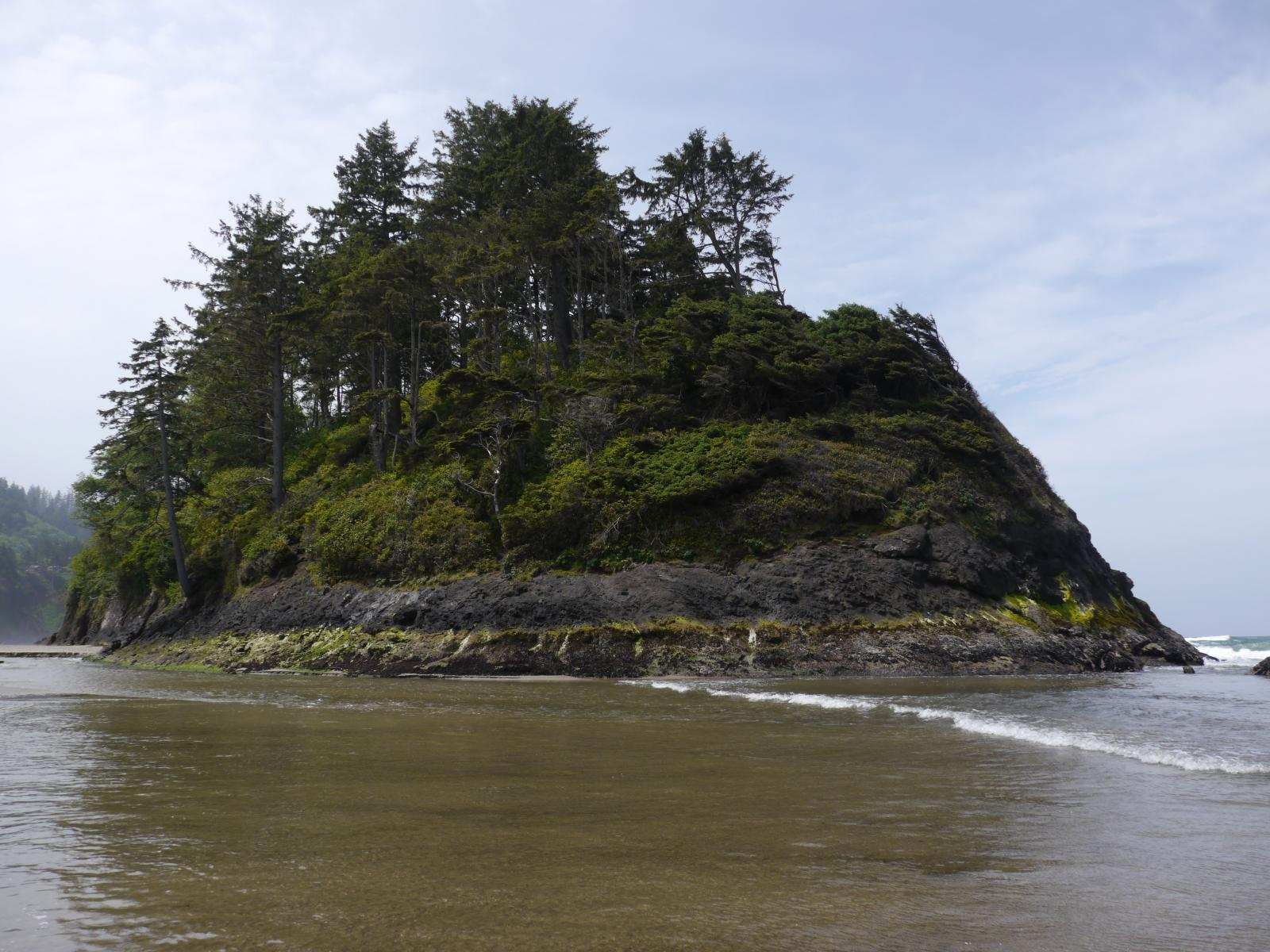
Proposal Rock in 2016

Nearby is the Neskowin Beach Oregon State Recreation Site. Administered by the Oregon Parks and Recreation Department (due to the Oregon Beach Bill), the site features Proposal Rock (Oregon) and periodically the Neskowin Ghost Forest.

== Education ==
It is in the Nestucca Valley School District 101J

The county is in the Tillamook Bay Community College district.

== Notable person ==
- Jerry Zimmerman Baseball player who died in Neskowin in 1998.
