= List of crossings of the Willamette River =

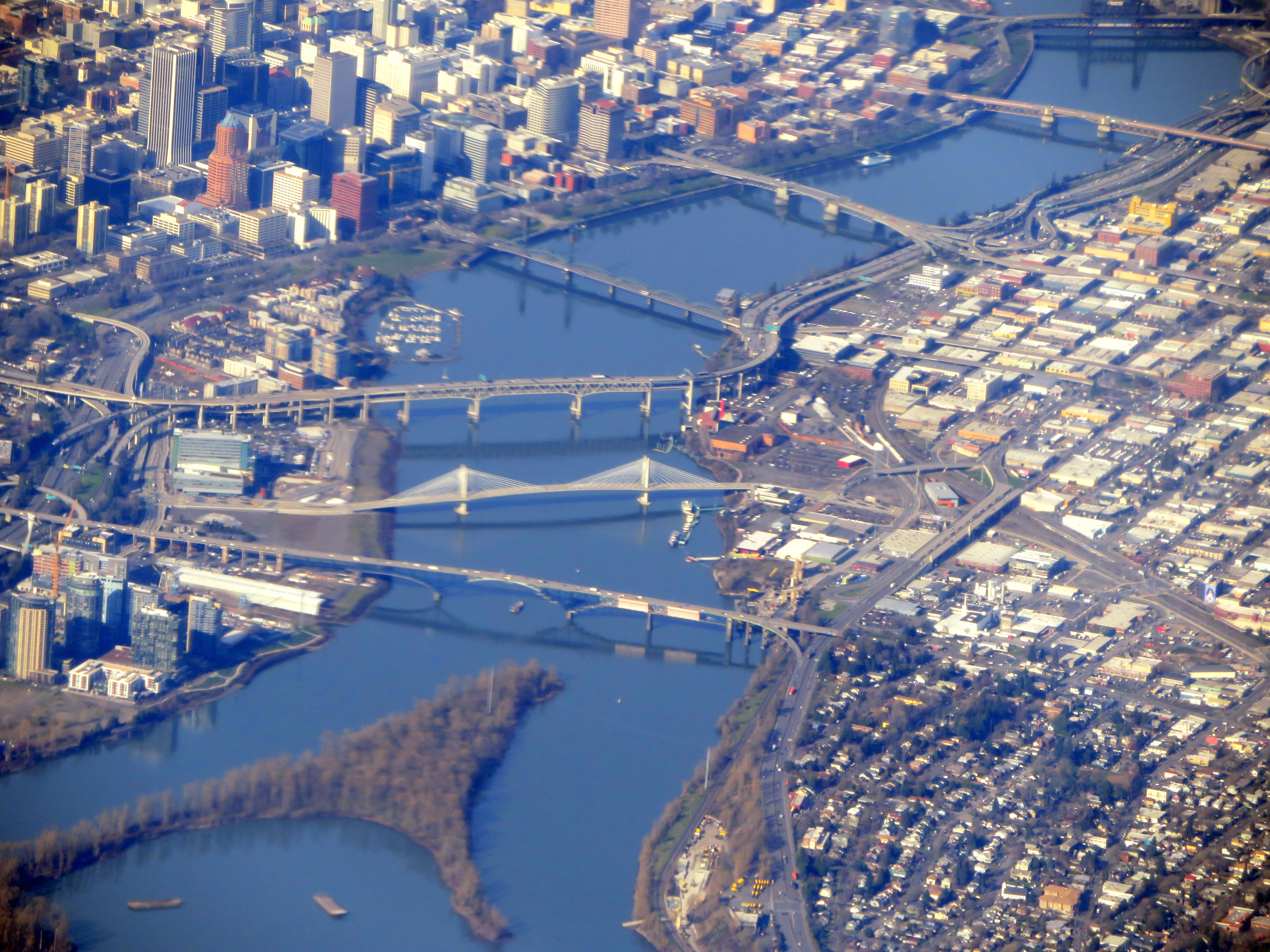
Aerial view of crossings in downtown Portland

This is a list of bridges and other crossings of the Willamette River in the U.S. state of Oregon from the Columbia River upstream to the confluence of the Middle Fork Willamette River and Coast Fork Willamette River. This confluence, at 44.023318°N 123.023897°W, is considered the source of the Willamette River.

== Sauvie Island (Multnomah Channel) ==
Image	Crossing	Carries	Location	River mile	Year built	Coordinates
	Wapato Bridge	Sauvie Island Road, sidewalks	Sauvie Island	3	2008	45.628021°N 122.816307°W

== Portland ==
Image	Crossing	Carries	Location	River mile	Year built	Coordinates
	St. Johns Bridge	US 30 Byp., sidewalks	Portland	5.8	1931	45.58528°N 122.76444°W
	Burlington Northern Railroad Bridge 5.1	BNSF Railway	Portland	7.0	1908/1989	45.57667°N 122.74750°W
	West Side CSO Tunnel	intercepted sewage overflow	Portland	10.0	2003	45.55000°N 122.69778°W
	Fremont Bridge	I-405 / US 30	Portland	11.1	1973	45.53778°N 122.68306°W
	Broadway Bridge	Broadway; Portland Streetcar; sidewalks	Portland	11.7	1913	45.53194°N 122.67417°W
	Steel Bridge	Union Pacific Railway; Amtrak; MAX Light Rail; Glisan Street, sidewalks, Interstate Avenue; Eastbank Esplanade (lower level), formerly Harbor Drive (former OR 99W)	Portland	12.1	1912	45.52750°N 122.66917°W
	Burnside Bridge	Burnside Street, sidewalks	Portland	12.4	1926	45.52306°N 122.66750°W
	Morrison Bridge	Morrison Street, sidewalks	Portland	12.8	1958	45.51778°N 122.66972°W
	Hawthorne Bridge	Hawthorne Boulevard, sidewalks	Portland	13.1	1910	45.51306°N 122.67056°W
	Marquam Bridge	I-5	Portland	13.5	1966	45.50806°N 122.66917°W
	Tilikum Crossing	TriMet MAX Orange Line and buses, Portland Streetcar, cycle lane, sidewalks	Portland	13.8	2015	45.5049°N 122.6670°W
	Ross Island Bridge	US 26 (Powell Boulevard), sidewalks	Portland	14.0	1926	45.50111°N 122.66444°W
	Sellwood Bridge	Tacoma Street, sidewalks	Portland	16.5	2016	45.46444°N 122.66556°W

== Northern Willamette Valley ==
Image	Crossing	Carries	Location	River mile	Year built	Coordinates
	Lake Oswego Railroad Bridge	Portland and Western Railroad	Lake Oswego/Milwaukie	20.0	1910	45.42500°N 122.65472°W
	Abernethy Bridge	I-205	Oregon City	25.0	1970	45.36444°N 122.60417°W
	Oregon City Bridge	OR 43, sidewalks	Oregon City	26.0	1922	45.35889°N 122.60972°W
	2 sets of aerial electric cable crossings		West Linn/Canby	30.0		45.31774°N 122.66585°W
	115 kV-line		Canby			45.299083°N 122.692012°W
	aerial electric power for the Canby Ferry		Canby	34.37		45.30009°N 122.69192°W
	Canby Ferry	SW Mountain Road (on the north), North Locust Street (on the south)	Canby	34.4	1914	45.30011°N 122.69273°W
	aerial electric cable crossing		Molalla River State Park	35.98		45.30214°N 122.72207°W
	Boone Bridge	I-5	Wilsonville	38.5	1954	45.29194°N 122.76944°W
	Wilsonville railroad bridge	(formerly) Oregon Electric Railway (currently) Portland & Western Railroad	Wilsonville	38.5	1907/1975	45.29306°N 122.77639°W
	Oregon Route 219 bridge	OR 219	Newberg	48.3	1958	45.26778°N 122.94333°W
	Champoeg Road bridge	Pipeline (Prior to 1958, carried OR 219, between the north ends of Riverside Road and Champoeg Road in Marion County and the south end of Wynooski Street in Newberg. Replaced an earlier ferry between Champoeg Road and the south end of Dog Ridge Road, about 1,200 feet (370 meters) west of the current highway bridge.)	Newberg	50.0		45.28377°N 122.96222°W

== Middle Willamette Valley ==
Image	Crossing	Carries	Location	River mile	Year built	Coordinates
	Wheatland Ferry	Wheatland Road	Wheatland	72.0	1844	45.09028°N 123.04500°W
	aerial electric power for the Wheatland Ferry		Wheatland			45.0900778°N 123.0454472°W
	medium voltage line		Wheatland			45.0908389°N 123.0448778°W
	Union Street Railroad Bridge	(formerly) Black Rock Rail Line, (currently) pedestrians, bicycles, emergency vehicles	Salem	84.1	1913	44.94722°N 123.04167°W
	Marion Street Bridge	OR 22 west (Marion Street)	Salem	84.4	1952	44.94583°N 123.04250°W
	Center Street Bridge	OR 22 east (Center Street)	Salem	84.5	1918	44.94500°N 123.04333°W
	Independence Street Bridge	River Road South, sidewalks	Independence	97.1	1950	44.84556°N 123.17972°W
	Buena Vista Ferry	Buena Vista Road	Buena Vista	106.0	1851	44.77000°N 123.14583°W
	aerial electric power for the Buena Vista Ferry		Buena Vista			44.7698250°N 123.1461750°W
	Toledo District Willamette Bridge	(formerly) Oregon Pacific Railroad, Southern Pacific (currently) Portland and Western Railroad/Toledo District	Albany	119.7	1887/1921	44.64085°N 123.09677°W
	Lyon Street Bridge	US 20 north (Lyon Street), sidewalk	Albany	120.0	1971	44.63917°N 123.10587°W
	Ellsworth Street Bridge	US 20 south (Ellsworth Street), sidewalks	Albany	120.1	1925	44.63924°N 123.10666°W
	Harrison Street Bridge	OR 34 west (Harrison Street), bicycle lane, sidewalk	Corvallis	131.5	1964	44.5661°N 123.25622°W
	Van Buren Street Bridge	OR 34 east (Van Buren Street), sidewalk	Corvallis	131.5	1913	44.56541°N 123.25652°W
	Corvallis Bypass Bridge	OR 34 Bypass	Corvallis	132.95	1992	44.55814°N 123.25987°W

== Southern Willamette Valley ==
Image	Crossing	Carries	Location	River mile	Year built	Coordinates
	OR 99E bridge	OR 99E, sidewalk	Harrisburg	161.2	1925	44.26708°N 123.17483°W
	Oregon Electric rail bridge; former vertical-lift type, now fixed in place	(formerly) Oregon Electric Railway, Burlington Northern (currently) Portland and Western Railroad	Junction City	162.7	1912	44.24864°N 123.17538°W
	(Oregon and California Railroad) Southern Pacific rail bridge; former swing-span type, now concrete-steel truss bridge	(formerly) Southern Pacific (currently) Union Pacific Railroad; Amtrak	Junction City	162.8	1871/1905/2014	44.24815°N 123.17451°W
	Beltline Highway (westbound), sidewalk	OR 569 west	Eugene	178.2	1961	44.09525°N 123.10651°W
	Beltline Highway (eastbound)	OR 569 east	Eugene	178.2	1966	44.09519°N 123.10666°W
	Owosso Bicycle Bridge		Eugene	178.7	1985	44.09185°N 123.11609°W
	Greenway Bicycle Bridge		Eugene	180.6	1978	44.06750°N 123.11175°W
	Washington-Jefferson Street Bridge	I-105 / OR 126	Eugene	181.2	1960	44.06391°N 123.10076°W
	Ferry Street Bridge	Coburg Road; Ruth Bascom Bike Path	Eugene	182.2	1950	44.05794°N 123.08391°W
	Peter DeFazio Bicycle Bridge		Eugene	182.35	2000	44.05691°N 123.08352°W
	Dave and Lynn Frohnmayer Pedestrian and Bicycle Bridge		Eugene	182.7	1970	44.05160°N 123.07127°W
	Knickerbocker Bicycle Bridge		Eugene	183.8	1978	44.04529°N 123.05214°W
	Whilamut Passage Bridge (west span)	I-5 south	Eugene	183.91	2011	44.04540°N 123.05010°W
	Whilamut Passage Bridge (east span)	I-5 north	Eugene	183.92	2013	44.04550°N 123.04958°W
	Springfield Bridge (north span)	OR 126 Bus. west (Main Street), sidewalks	Springfield	185.25	1950	44.04544°N 123.02743°W
	Springfield Bridge (south span)	OR 126 Bus. east (South "A" Street), sidewalk	Springfield	185.3		44.04511°N 123.02718°W
	Springfield Southern Pacific Rail bridge	Union Pacific Railroad; Amtrak	Springfield	185.4	1906/1926	44.04308°N 123.02615°W

== North Fork Middle Fork Willamette River ==
Image	Crossing	Carries	Location	Year built	Coordinates
	Winfrey Bridge	Winfrey Road–Westfir Road connector	Westfir		43.75739°N 122.51205°W
	Office Bridge	Westoak Road	Westfir	1941; 1944	43.75849°N 123.49571°W
	Union Pacific rail bridge	Union Pacific Railroad; Amtrak	Westfir		43.75984°N 122.49427°W
	US Forest Service Road 1910 bridge	US Forest Service Road 1910	Northeast of Westfir		43.78909°N 122.46248°W
	US Forest Service Road 1912 bridge	US Forest Service Road 1912	Northeast of Westfir		43.80279°N 122.43695°W
	US Forest Service Road 19 bridge	US Forest Service Road 19	Northeast of Westfir		43.84197°N 122.40484°W
	US Forest Service Road 19 bridge	US Forest Service Road 19	Northeast of Westfir		43.85189°N 122.40704°W
	US Forest Service Road 1925 bridge	US Forest Service Road 1925	Northeast of Westfir		43.87988°N 122.38545°W
	US Forest Service Road 1926 bridge	US Forest Service Road 1926	Northeast of Westfir		43.88609°N 122.37284°W
	US Forest Service Road 19 bridge	US Forest Service Road 19	Northeast of Westfir		43.88451°N 122.24496°W
	US Forest Service Road 1944 bridge	US Forest Service Road 1944	Northeast of Westfir		43.87168°N 122.17137°W

== Middle Fork Willamette River ==
Image	Crossing	Carries	Location	Year built	Coordinates
	Jasper Bridge	Parkway Road	Jasper	1952	43.99823°N 122.90596°W
	Wheeler Road Rail Bridge	Union Pacific Railroad; Amtrak	Pleasant Hill		43.97646°N 123.88561°W
	Dexter Dam	Dam accessway	Dexter	1955	43.92347°N 122.80559°W
	Lowell Bridge	Lowell Bridge (pedestrian traffic only; closed 1981)	Lowell	1907 (original); 1945 (current)	43.90957°N 122.77951°W
	Pioneer Street bridge	Pioneer Street	Lowell	1981	43.91194°N 122.77891°W
	Lookout Point Dam	Dam accessway	Lowell	1954	43.91519°N 122.75211°W
	Union Pacific rail bridge	Union Pacific Railroad; Amtrak	Lowell		43.81492°N 122.58520°W
	Old Barnard Bridge	Westfir Road	Westfir	1923	43.77514°N 122.52719°W
	OR-58 (Willamette Highway) bridge	OR 58	Oakridge	1955	43.74689°N 122.51117°W
	US Forest Service Road 21 bridge	US Forest Service Road 21	South of Oakridge		43.72101°N 122.43087°W
	Hills Creek Dam	Dam accessway	South of Oakridge	1961	43.70973°N 122.42187°W
	Bearbones Bridge	US Forest Service Road 2127	South of Oakridge		43.53983°N 122.44786°W
	US Forest Service Road 2133 bridge	US Forest Service Road 2133	South of Oakridge		43.49837°N 122.40217°W
	US Forest Service Road 2143 bridge	US Forest Service Road 2143	South of Oakridge		43.50074°N 122.31389°W
	US Forest Service Road 2153 bridge	US Forest Service Road 2153	South of Oakridge		43.44247°N 122.19294°W

== Former crossings ==
Image	Crossing	Carried	Location	River mile	Year built	Coordinates
	"First" Steel Bridge (until 1912)	OR&N Railway	Portland	12.0	1888	
	Madison Street Bridge (Note: Two former bridges over the Willamette River in Portland were named the Madison Street Bridge. Together, they were active from 1891 to 1909.)	Madison Street	Portland	13.1	1891, 1900	45.51333°N 122.67083°W
	Boones Ferry	Boones Ferry Road	Wilsonville	38.9	1847	45.29312°N 122.775038°W
	Springfield PE&E Streetcar Bridge (until 1926)	Portland, Eugene and Eastern Streetcar	Springfield	185.3	1910	

== See also ==
- Course of the Willamette River
- List of bridges in Portland, Oregon
- List of crossings of the Columbia River
- Lists of Oregon-related topics
