= Historic ferries in Oregon =

Historic U.S. state water transport

Historic ferries in Oregon are water transport ferries that operated in Oregon Country, Oregon Territory, and the state of Oregon, United States. They allowed people to cross bodies of water, primarily rivers such as the Willamette in the Willamette Valley and the Columbia, to transport goods, move people, and facilitate communication until permanent bridges were built for faster crossings. Early ferries were used by wagons and pedestrians, while later ones transported trains and then automobiles. Oregon still has a few automobile ferries in operation.

== Willamette River ==
=== Early ferries ===
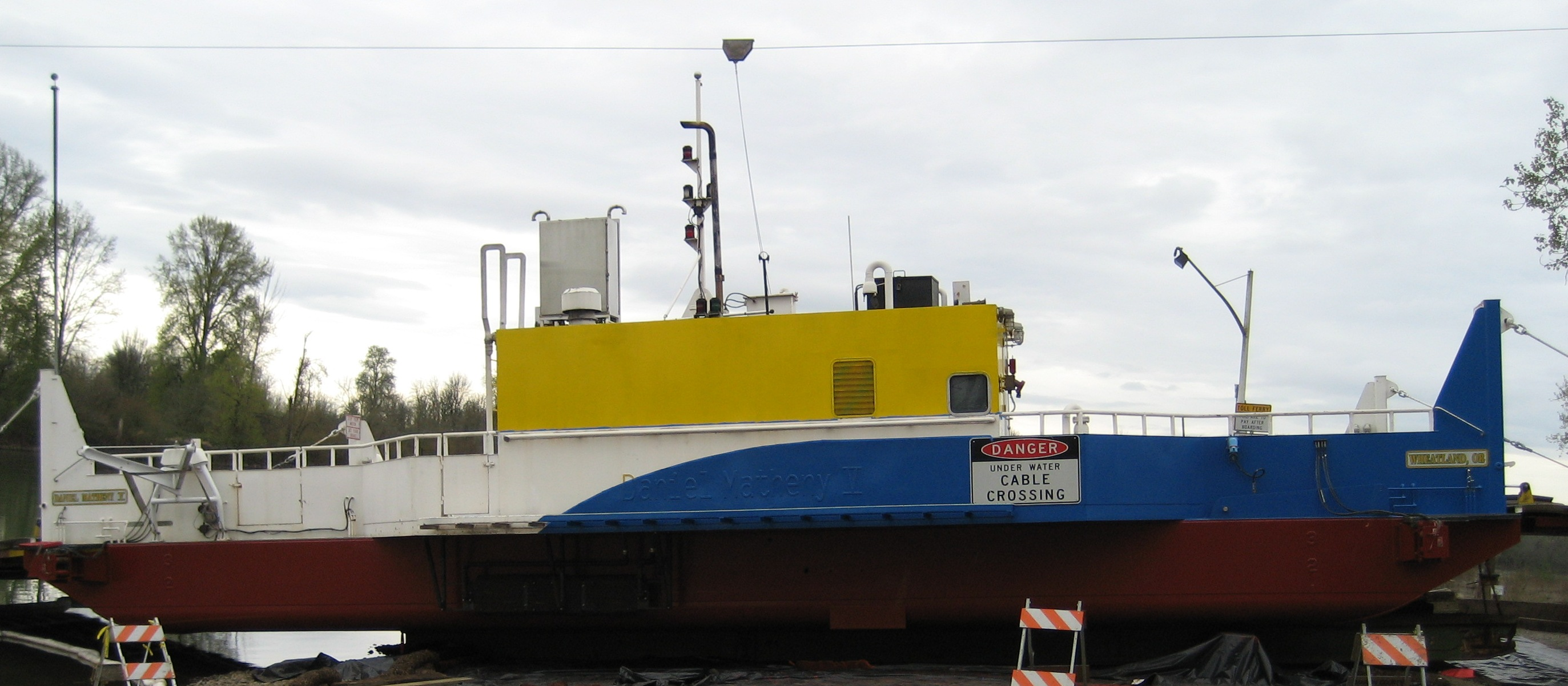
The modern Wheatland Ferry

The first recorded ferry in Oregon was on the Willamette River near present-day Wheatland. This ferry was built during 1843–1844 and operated by Jesse Applegate when he occupied the former Methodist Mission at Mission Bottom. Daniel Matheny later started the Wheatland Ferry in the 1850s around the same location.

The Michel Laframboise Ferry operated on the Willamette running between Champoeg on the south bank and the north bank of the river. The ferry operated from 1850 to 1857.

Boone's Ferry was operated, starting in 1847, by Alphonso Boone, grandson of Daniel Boone. This ferry remained in operation near Wilsonville until 1954, when a bridge was built over the Willamette near the ferry site.

=== Benton County ===
About 1860, a ferry began crossing the Willamette River at Corvallis.

=== Polk and Marion counties ===
Discontinued ferries in Polk and Marion County include the Claggett at Independence, which ran until 1950. Hales Ferry, near Jefferson, operated as early as 1846, and another Jefferson ferry was run by Jacob S. Conser in 1848. Doaks Ferry operated six miles (10 km) north of Salem. It was established in the 1840s by Andrew Jackson Doak, and sold in 1860 to Jesse Walling, who platted Lincoln, Oregon. Doaks Ferry Road is named for it. Spongs Ferry operated at Spong's Landing, now a Marion County park, on the opposite side of the river from Doaks. Halls Ferry operated beginning in 1868 about six miles (10 km) south of Salem, and Halls Ferry Road still exists today. The ferry was started by Isaac (or Noah) Leabo, who sold to it Benjamin Franklin (B. F.) Hall in either 1882 or 1884, when it became known as Halls Ferry. B. F. Hall's father, Reason B. Hall, was the founder of the Buena Vista Ferry in 1852, which still operates to this day. Halls Ferry changed hands twice and was subsequently renamed, first to "Croisan's Ferry" and later to "Pettyjohn's Ferry". It is uncertain when the ferry ceased operations. There was also a "Halls Ferry" railroad station at this locale.

==== Salem ferry ====
The ferry in Salem was started by James White in 1846. White later partnered with Salem founder William H. Willson. Captain White died in the explosion of the steamer Gazelle at Canemah on April 8, 1854. At one point, his widow became the sole proprietor of the ferry until she partnered with Jasper N. Matheny, whose family was involved with the ferry business at Wheatland. The widow White eventually sold out to Matheny, who later formed a partnership that included James N. Glover, the founder of Spokane, Washington. Ownership of the ferry company changed several times—at one point, ownership included judge Reuben P. Boise—until the Secretary of State declared the company defunct in 1905.

=== Clackamas County ===
Robert Moore operated a ferry between Linn City and Oregon City beginning in 1849, and Hugh Burns also operated a ferry around that time at Oregon City.

=== Lane County ===
A. & L. Coryell's ferry near the confluence of the Middle and Coast forks of the Willamette operated as early as 1847.

=== Current ferries ===
The only Willamette ferries still in operation are Wheatland, Buena Vista, and Canby.

== Portland ==
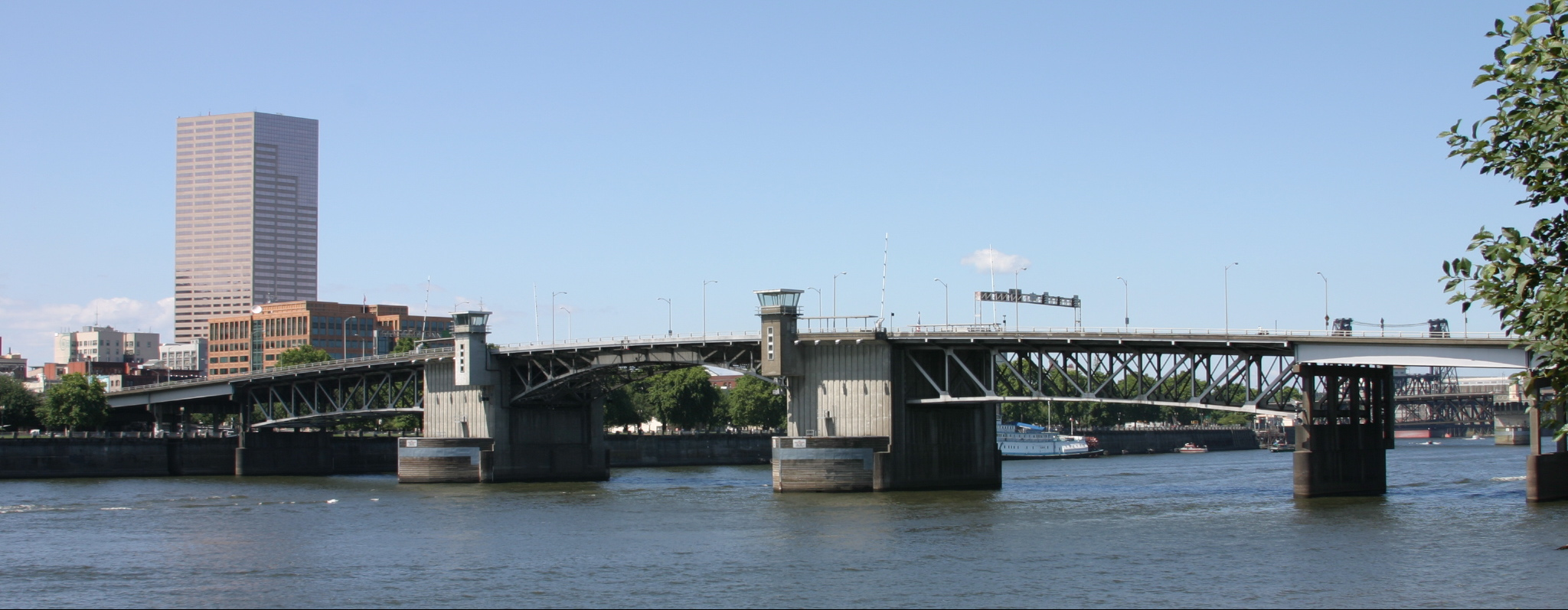
The modern Morrison Bridge. An earlier version replaced the Stark Street Ferry

One of the first ferries operating in what is now Portland, Oregon, was Switzler's ferry that crossed the Columbia River in 1846 between the Hudson's Bay Company's Fort Vancouver and the south bank of the river. Then in 1848, Stephen Coffin established a ferry on the Willamette using a wooden platform over canoes. The Stark Street Ferry operated from 1855 until ferry traffic declined due to the opening of the Morrison Bridge in 1887, and the removal of tolls on the bridge in 1895. In 1888, the completion of a railroad bridge (the original Steel Bridge) allowed the Oregon & California Railroad to cease using their passenger ferry, which had begun operations in 1870, using barges to move the trains across the river.

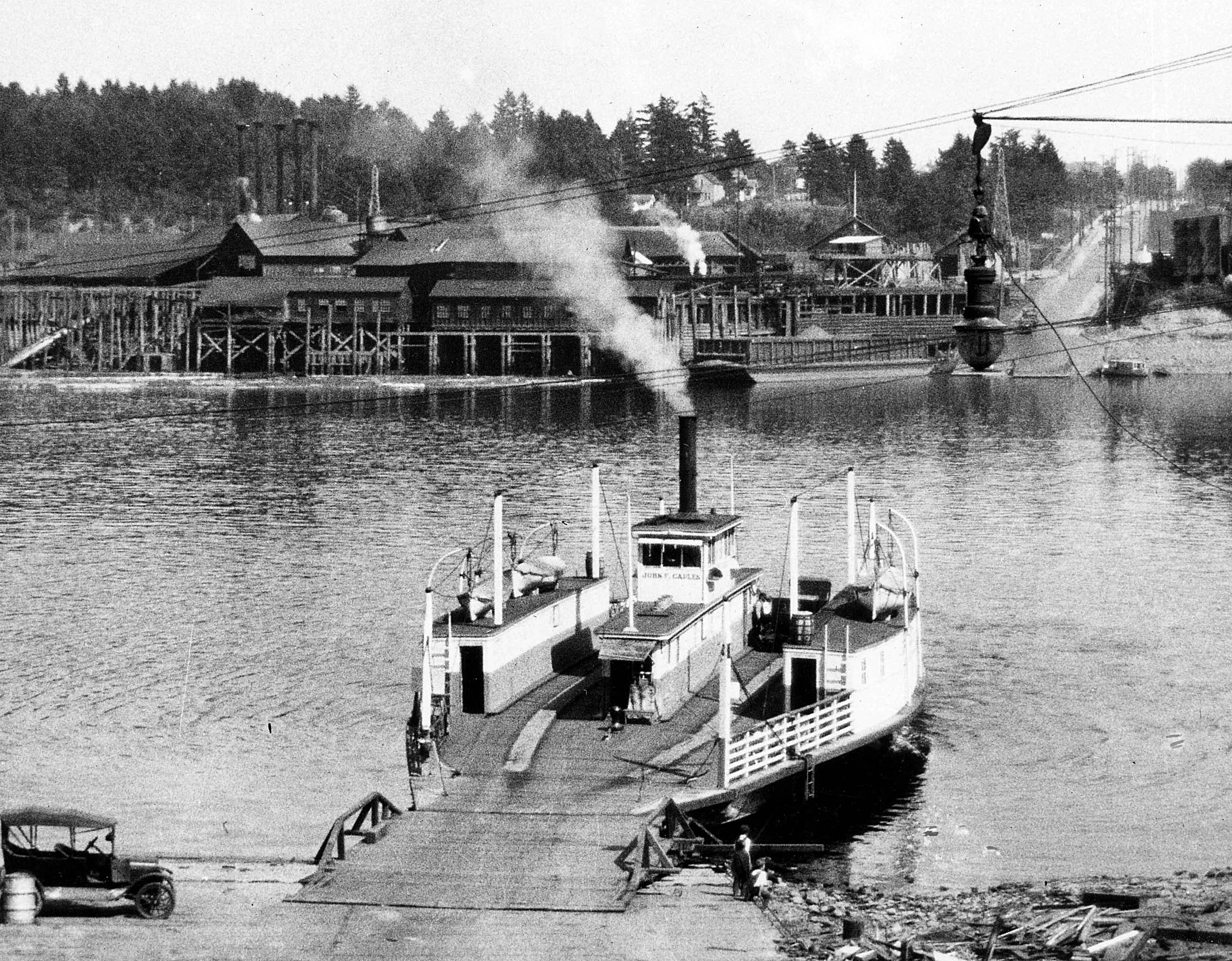
The Spokane Street Ferry, the John F. Caples, in 1925

The Spokane Street Ferry, also called the Sellwood Ferry, shuttled passengers across the Willamette between Sellwood and west Portland. The final ferry, the John F. Caples, was discontinued in 1925 when the Sellwood Bridge opened.

The last ferry service to operate in the Portland metropolitan area was the Sauvie Island Ferry, replaced in 1950 by the first Sauvie Island Bridge.

== Columbia River ==
Ferries crossing the Columbia included the steel Kalama (later Tacoma) which transported trains between Kalama, Washington and Goble, Oregon. This train ferry was shipped in more than 50,000 parts around Cape Horn and assembled in Portland. This Northern Pacific Railroad ferry was 338 feet (103 m) long and 42 feet (13 m) wide and continued in use from 1883 until around 1910 when a railroad bridge across the river was built. The Astoria–Megler Ferry operated at the mouth of the Columbia, between Megler, Washington and Astoria, Oregon, until the Astoria-Megler Bridge was built in the 1960s. There was also a ferry between Biggs, Oregon and Maryhill, Washington.

== Others ==
The Oregon Coast had many ferries along its length, until the 1930s, when bridges were built across the bays for U.S. Route 101. At least one, Bullards Ferry across the Coquille River, lasted until the mid-1950s, when the Bullards Bridge replaced it. Other ferries operated in Southern Oregon to allow transit to California. To the east, Brownlee's Ferry began operating across the Snake River between Oregon and Idaho in 1862. Olds Ferry was founded upstream of Brownlee at Farewell Bend a year later.

Ferries also operated across the Tualatin River. These included Scholls Ferry at Scholls, operated by Peter Scholl. Scholl settled in the area in 1848, and began operating the ferry in 1850, along what was then the main route between Portland and the upper portions of the Willamette Valley. In the late 1850s, Scholl built a covered toll bridge across the river, but it was washed away in a flood. A more permanent bridge came in 1870, but the crossing became less important when Taylor's Ferry opened downstream. Philip Harris operated a ferry across the Tualatin at Farmington.

"Indian Mary" operated a ferry across the Rogue River in Southern Oregon in the late 19th century.

== See also ==
- Tourist sternwheelers of Oregon
- Wahkiakum County Ferry
