= Frohnmayer =

Frohnmayer or Frohnmaier is a surname. Notable people with the surname include:

- David B. Frohnmayer, 15th president of the University of Oregon
- John Frohnmayer, retired attorney from the U.S. state of Oregon
- Mark Frohnmayer, American entrepreneur
- Markus Frohnmaier, German politician

== See also ==
- Dave and Lynn Frohnmayer Pedestrian and Bicycle Bridge
- MarAbel B. Frohnmayer Music Building
