= Holman State Wayside =

Protected area in Oregon, US

- Location within Oregon Location within the United States
- Type: Public, state
- Location: Polk County, Oregon
- Nearest city: Salem
- Coordinates: 44°55′56″N 123°06′24″W
- Area: 10 acres (4 ha)
- Operator: Oregon Parks and Recreation Department

Holman State Wayside is a state park in Polk County, Oregon, United States, on Oregon Route 22 at the foot of the Eola Hills near the community of Eola. The wayside is administered by the Oregon Parks and Recreation Department but was closed to vehicular traffic in 2007 because of ongoing problems with criminal activity.

The site was purchased by the State of Oregon in 1922. The land was originally owned by Thomas and Cora Holman, who had long allowed the public to water their stock and drink at a natural spring on the property, a purpose it had served since pioneer times. The 10-acre (4 ha) park is on a hillside forested with Douglas-firs, Oregon white oaks and bigleaf maples, and has picnic tables and a walking trail.

Bicycle and pedestrian traffic is still permitted in the park, although the restrooms have been demolished since 2013. In 2007, the Parks and Recreation Department said the closure of the wayside was temporary while solutions to the park's problems were discussed, and held a public hearing regarding the future of the wayside.

== See also ==
- List of Oregon state parks
