= Wheatland Ferry =

Ferry in US state of Oregon

Coordinates: 45.09083°N 123.04444°W

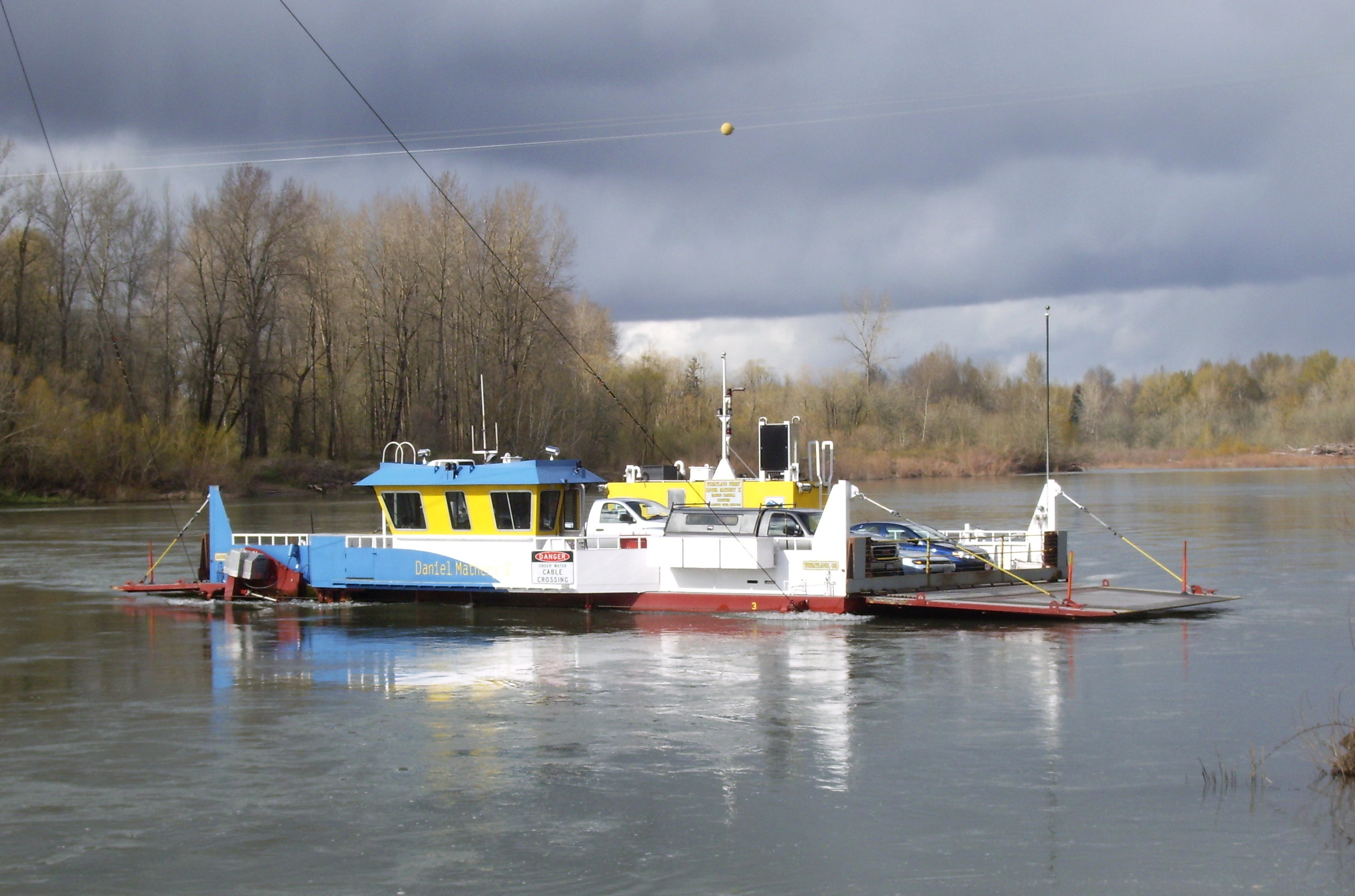
- The Wheatland Ferry approaches the east bank of the Willamette carrying a typical weekend load of vehicles
- Locale: Wheatland, Oregon
- Waterway: Willamette River
- Transit type: Electric cable ferry
- Carries: Matheny Road; Wheatland Road
- Operator: Marion County, Oregon
- Began operation: 1850s
- No. of vessels: 1 (Daniel Matheny V)
- No. of terminals: 2

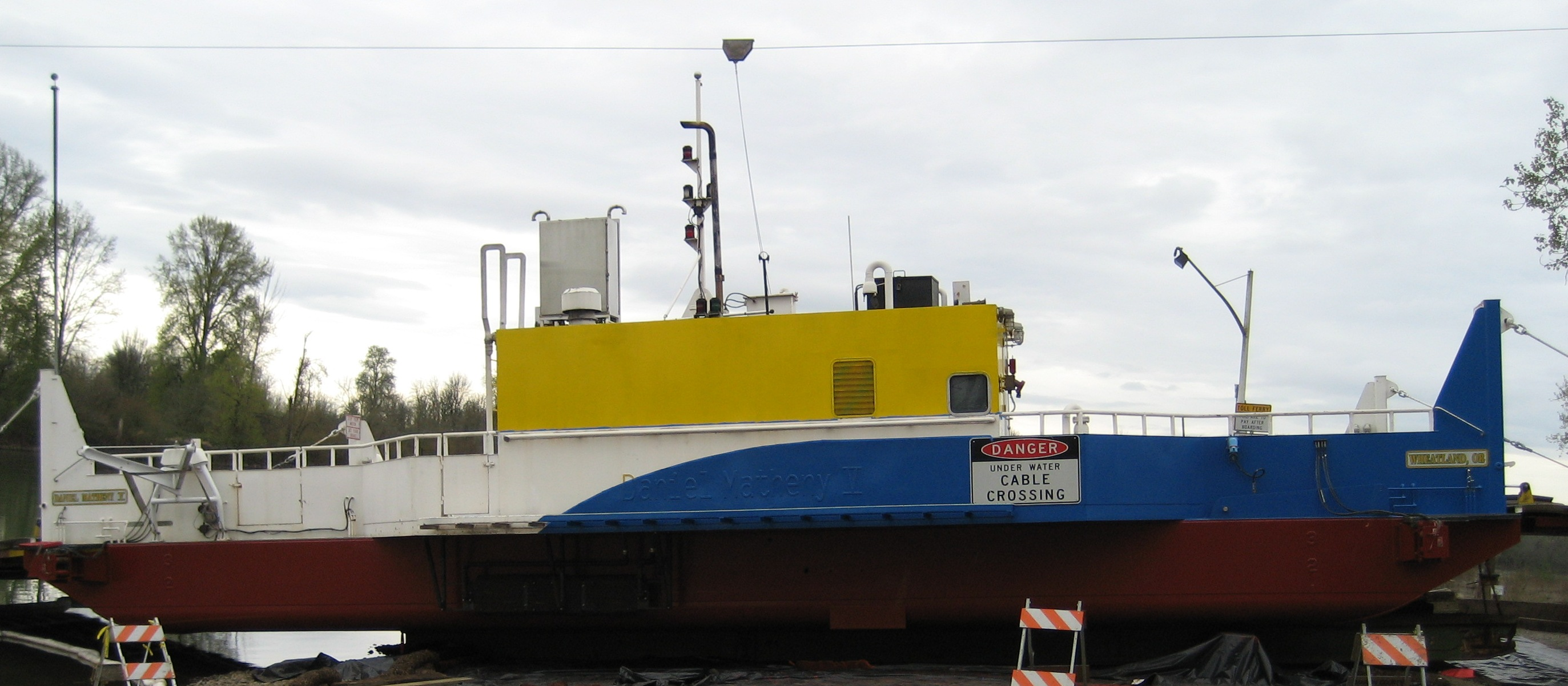
The ferry on land

The Wheatland Ferry is a cable ferry that connects Marion County and Yamhill County across the Willamette River in the U.S. state of Oregon. The ferry travels approximately 580 feet (180 meters) across the river, depending on the height of the river, and is powered by two electric motors connected to an on-board diesel generator. The ferry is supported by two steel cables, one under water on the downriver side, and one overhead on the upriver side. The ferry also uses the overhead cable for steering.

Each time a replacement Wheatland ferry is launched, it is always named Daniel Matheny, after the person who originally established the ferry, followed by its number as a Roman numeral. The current ferry, launched in 2002 is Daniel Matheny V. This most recent ferry differs from its predecessors in that it has a capacity of nine cars, rather than the six Daniel Matheny IV carried, and it has its own self-contained diesel-electric generator. As its source of electricity is now an onboard generator, the current ferry is no longer reliant on electricity from overhead wires. The overhead cable serves the sole purpose of bracing the ferry against the current.

The ferry is a joint operation of Marion and Yamhill counties, with Marion County taking the responsibility of staffing and operating the ferry. It operates every day that river conditions permit. In summer, low water levels can cause the ferry to bottom out. Dredging is sometimes employed to deepen the ferry's crossing lane to keep it operating longer during the dry season. During rainy months, high water levels and fast currents can stop ferry operations.

All vehicles must pay a toll. Pedestrians travel at no charge.

== Location ==
The Wheatland Ferry is located at Willamette River mile 72, near the former community of Wheatland and Willamette Mission State Park and roughly between the cities of Salem and Newberg. Its location is strategic, because the nearest bridge in either direction is roughly 15 miles distant. The Wheatland Ferry is sometimes used as an alternative to the bridge which crosses the Willamette River in Salem.

== History ==
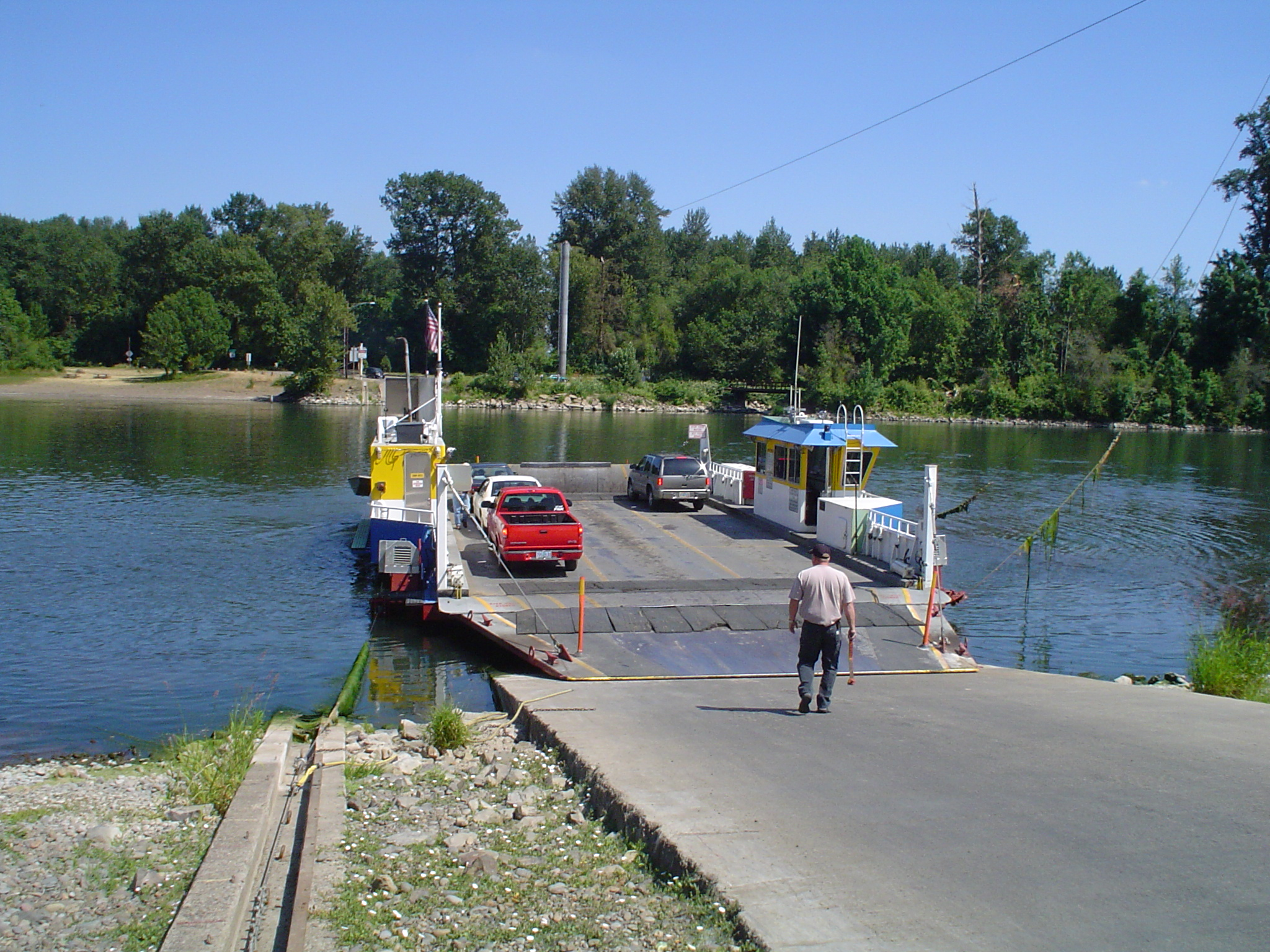
The downriver guide cable is visible at left descending into the water; upriver overhead cables are at top right.

The first Daniel Matheny ferry was started by Daniel Matheny himself, in the 1850s. The ferry was a wooden raft powered by men with wooden poles.

The current ferry was built at Mar Com Shipyard in Portland Oregon in 2001.

== Controversy ==
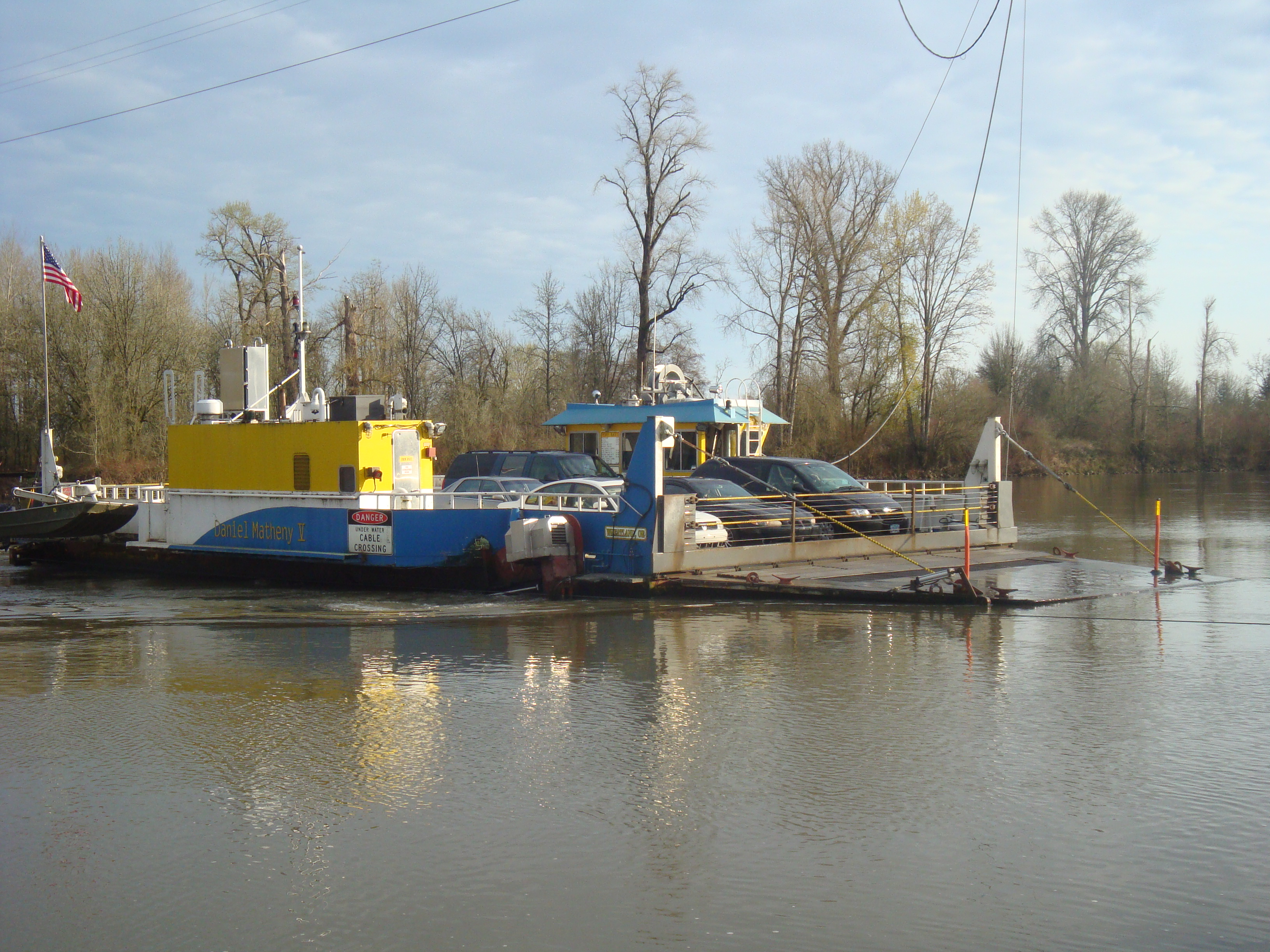
The ferry in February 2010

The Wheatland Ferry has been a catalyst for local political controversy. Some of this is the natural result of the challenges of inter-county politics and budget issues. Motorists who frequently use the ferry are another factor, citing long wait times, frequent closures for maintenance and increasing prices. Because of its proximity to Salem, the state's capital and second largest city, political and practical issues over Salem's own bridge issues affect the Wheatland Ferry.

Additional concerns about the ferry's operation were raised after the ferry operator was found to be intoxicated while running the ferry on November 4, 2012.

== Ridership ==
The estimated annual number of vehicle crossings for 2007 was 240,000. While Yamhill and Marion counties are trying to increase ridership, the wait for the ferry can be lengthy at peak times. During harvest seasons, the ferry is frequently used by farmers delivering produce to canneries across the river.

== See also ==
- Buena Vista Ferry
- Canby Ferry
- Boones Ferry
- Historic ferries of Oregon
- List of crossings of the Willamette River
