= Peter DeFazio Bridge =

Bridge in Eugene, Oregon, U.S.

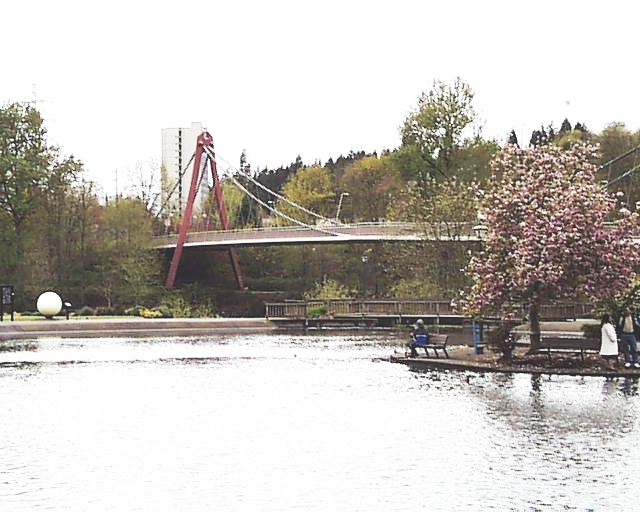
- Coordinates: 44.05691°N 123.08352°W
- Carries: Ruth Bascom Bicycle Path
- Crosses: Willamette River
- Locale: Eugene, Oregon
- Owner: City of Eugene

Characteristics
- Total length: 590 ft.
- No. of spans: 1

History
- Designer: Jiri Strasky, OBEC Consulting Engineers
- Engineering design by: OBEC Consulting Engineers
- Constructed by: Mowat Construction
- Construction end: 2000
- Construction cost: $2.8 million

The Peter DeFazio Bridge is a bicycle and pedestrian bridge located in Eugene, Oregon, that crosses the Willamette River. The bridge was completed in 2000 and cost $2.8 million.

== See also ==
- List of crossings of the Willamette River
