= Buena Vista, Oregon =

Unincorporated community in the state of Oregon, United States

Coordinates: 44°46′10″N 123°09′02″W

Buena Vista (/ˌbjuːnə ˈvɪstə/ BEW-nə VIST-ə) is an unincorporated community in Polk County, Oregon, United States. It is located on the Willamette River, and is the western landing for the Buena Vista Ferry. It is approximately 7 miles (11 km) south-southeast of Independence.

== History ==
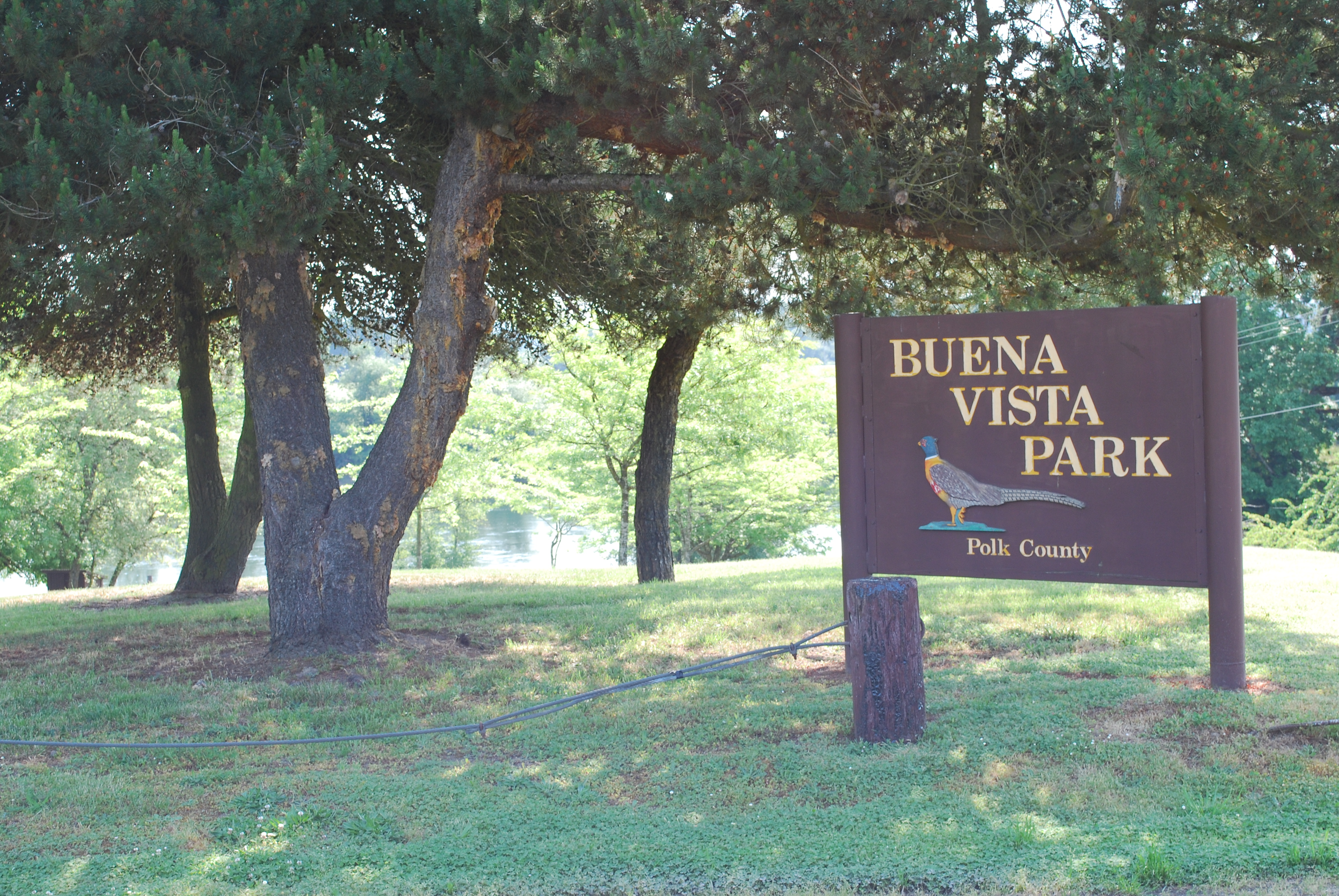

Buena Vista was named in about 1850 by Reason B. Hall, who settled on a Donation Land Claim there in 1847. Some of Hall's relatives had participated in the Battle of Buena Vista during the Mexican–American War. About the same time he named the community, Hall also started Halls Ferry across the Willamette. The ferry later became known as the Buena Vista Ferry, which is still in operation today. Later one of Hall's sons, B.F. Hall, operated another Halls Ferry north of Independence.

Buena Vista was once the home of the Oregon Pottery Company, which shipped its wares all over Oregon via the Willamette River. One of the earliest settlements in Oregon, it once had a much greater population because of the pottery industry, as well as being an important hops-growing area. Buena Vista had saloons, a hotel, a school, a church, an I.O.O.F. hall and a store. The town later went into decline, especially because the railroad bypassed Buena Vista and instead was routed through Independence. Today, most of the principal buildings are gone and the community is considered a ghost town by authors of ghost town guidebooks, although local residents tend to disagree. Buena Vista formerly had a post office by the same name, which existed from 1866 to 1935. At the top of a steep hill to the north of town the Buena Vista cemetery includes graves dating back to the 1800s.

The Buena Vista Store burned to the ground around 1970 and the I.O.O.F hall burned to the ground in the mid-1990s. The Buena Vista Methodist Church was moved from its original location on a hill to the west of town into the center of town and celebrated its 100th anniversary in 1968, and was eventually razed and replaced by a new building. The Buena Vista Park, which is a Polk County park, was built around 1970 and includes a boat launch ramp; the purpose was to prevent locals from using the ferry landing as a boat launch. The Buena Vista schoolhouse was a large two-room building that in 1972 was renovated and became the home of Johnny Craviotto, founder of the Craviotto drums company.

Buena Vista means "good view" or "beautiful view" in Spanish, and is pronounced "byoona vista" locally; many residents refer to the town as just "byoonee".
