= Wheatland, Oregon =

Unincorporated community in the state of Oregon, United States

Wheatland
- Unincorporated community
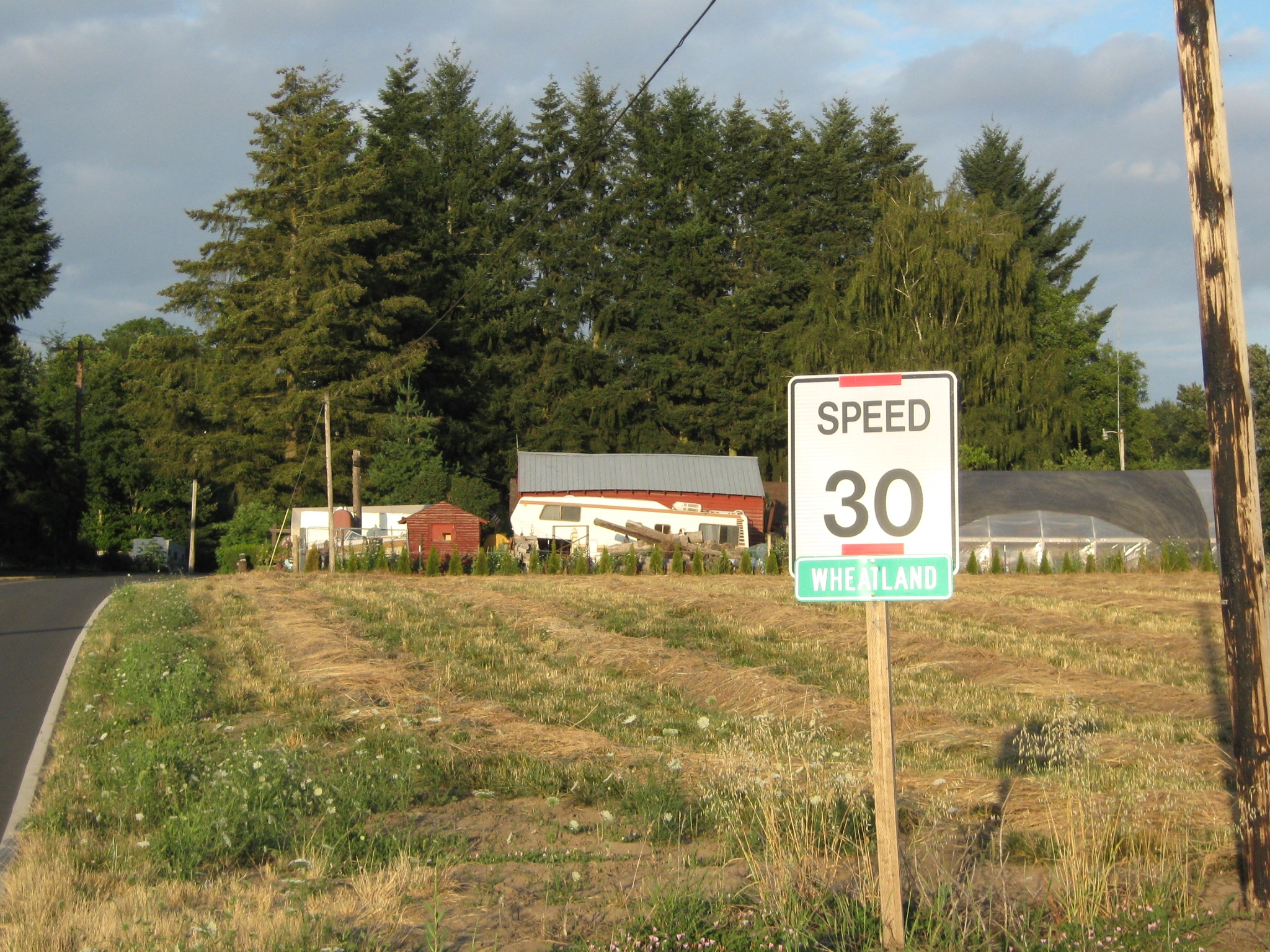
- Wheatland

- Location within the state of Oregon Wheatland (the United States)
- Coordinates: 45°05′33″N 123°03′00″W
- Country: United States
- State: Oregon
- County: Yamhill
- Elevation: 118 ft (36 m)
- Time zone: UTC-8 (Pacific (PST))
  - Summer (DST): UTC-7 (PDT)
- GNIS feature ID: 1136896

Wheatland is an unincorporated community in Yamhill County, Oregon, United States. It is near the Willamette River where the Wheatland Ferry takes traffic across the river into Marion County. It is in the Pacific Time Zone.

== See also ==
- Willamette Mission State Park, across the river from Wheatland
  - Methodist Mission in Oregon, former settlement now part of the state park
- Wheatland Ferry, a historic river crossing and currently the only one between Salem and Newberg
- Maud Williamson State Recreation Site, a few miles to the west, donated and named after a teacher who taught at the former Wheatland school
