= Willamette Mission State Park =

State park in Oregon, United States

- Formerly: Mission Bottom; Lone Tree Bar State Park
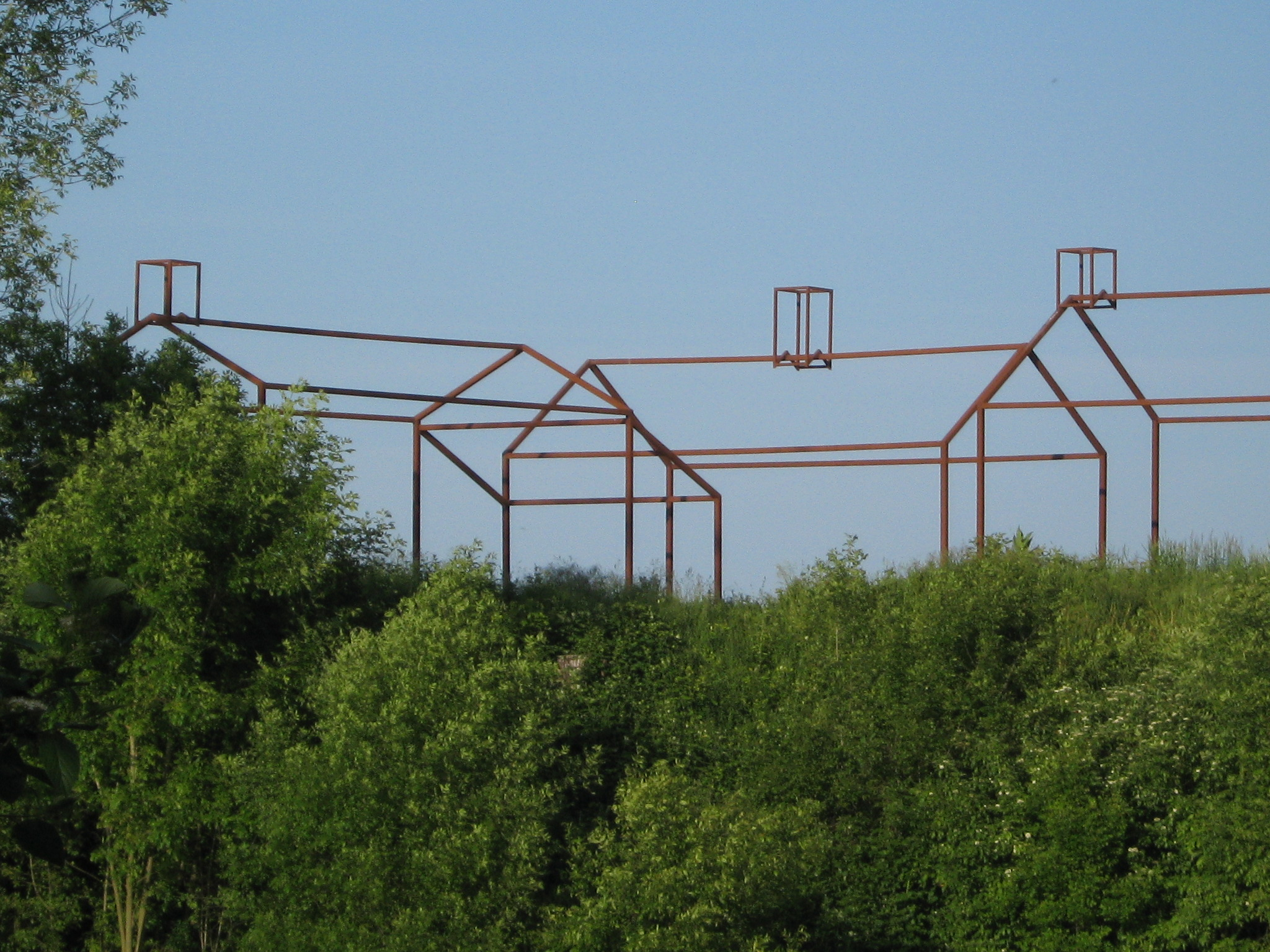
- A "ghost structure" marks the location of the mission

- Location within Oregon Location within the United States
- Type: Public, state
- Location: Marion County, Oregon
- Nearest city: Gervais
- Coordinates: 45°04′31″N 123°03′00″W
- Area: 1,680 acres (680 ha)
- Created: October 6, 1834
- Founder: Rev. Jason Lee
- Operator: Oregon Parks and Recreation Department
- Visitors: ~280,000
- Status: Open all year
- Designated: May 24, 1982
- Willamette Station Site, Methodist Mission in Oregon
- U.S. National Register of Historic Places
- City of Gervias, Oregon - Marion County
- Area: ~6 Acres
- Built: 1834-1836
- Architect: Rev. Jason Lee, Missionary
- Architectural style: Un-hewn log Wood slab-lap roof
- NRHP reference No.: 84003040
- Added to NRHP: August 1, 1984

Willamette Mission State Park is a state park in the U.S. state of Oregon, located about four miles (6.4 km) north of Keizer adjacent to the Wheatland Ferry and east of the Willamette River. It includes Willamette Station Site, Methodist Mission in Oregon, which is listed by the National Register of Historic Places.

== History ==
The park is the site of the Willamette Mission, established in 1834 by Jason Lee, who traveled to the area to convert Native Americans in the Oregon Country to Christianity. The missionaries built a one-room house that served as a school, chapel, hospital, and living quarters. They later added onto the house and built a barn. In September 1837, more missionaries arrived and built a blacksmith shop, granary, hospital, and a building that doubled as a school and a dining hall; the ensuing settlement became known as Mission Bottom. The mission later moved in 1840 to Salem (known then as Chemeketa). In a flood in 1861, the mission site was extensively damaged, and the Willamette River changed its course. The mission site is listed on the National Register of Historic Places as the "Willamette Station Site, Methodist Mission in Oregon". A "ghost structure" marks the location of the mission.

== Details ==
Located along the east bank of the Willamette River, the 1,680-acre (6.8 km^{2}) park contains eight miles (13 km) of hiking trails along the river. The park is home to what might be the largest black cottonwood in the United States. The Willamette Mission Cottonwood was designated an Oregon Heritage Tree by the Oregon Heritage Tree Committee.

== See also ==
- List of Oregon State Parks
