= Dave and Lynn Frohnmayer Pedestrian and Bicycle Bridge =

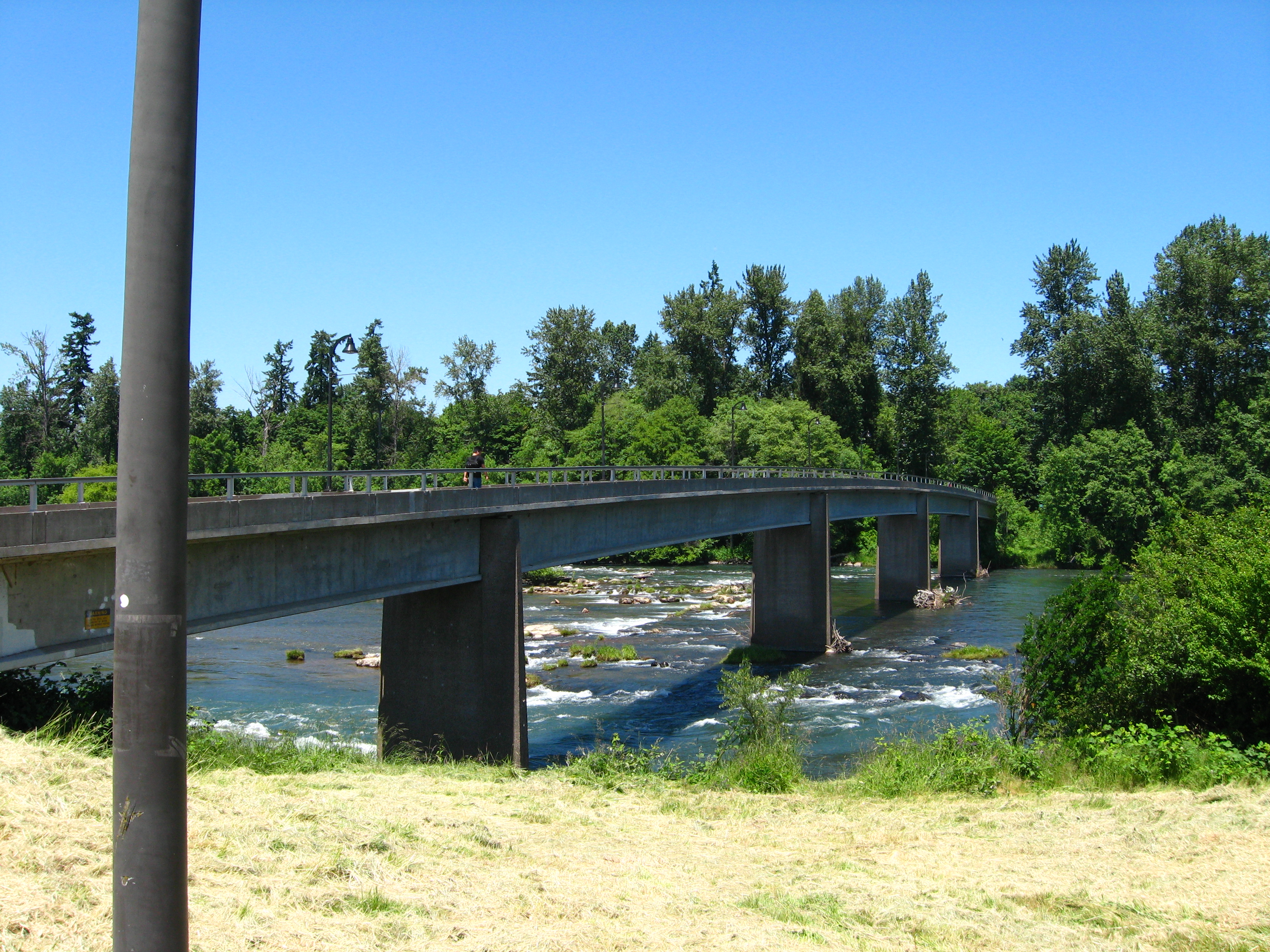
- Coordinates: 44.0515°N 123.0714°W
- Carries: bicycle and pedestrian traffic, steam pipe (no longer used)
- Crosses: Willamette River
- Locale: Eugene, Oregon
- Other name(s): Autzen Footbridge
- Owner: City of Eugene

Characteristics
- Material: Concrete
- Total length: 667 ft (203 m)
- Width: 14 ft (4.3 m)
- No. of spans: 6
- Piers in water: 4

History
- Designer: OBEC Consulting Engineers
- Construction cost: $175,000
- Opened: 1970

Statistics
- Toll: none

The Dave and Lynn Frohnmayer Pedestrian and Bicycle Bridge, formerly and still informally known as the Autzen Footbridge, is a bicycle and pedestrian bridge across the Willamette River, located in Eugene, Oregon, in the United States. Named after former University of Oregon president David B. Frohnmayer, the bridge connects Alton Baker Park and Autzen Stadium.

The bridge was originally proposed in 1970 by the Eugene Water & Electric Board (EWEB) to carry steam between EWEB's steam plant and a commercial greenhouse near Autzen Stadium. The river's bedrock deterred installing a buried pipe. In proposing a bridge, EWEB offered the university and Lane County the option of incorporating a pedestrian bridge if they paid the extra cost.

== See also ==
- Bicycle bridge
- List of crossings of the Willamette River
