= Canby Ferry =

Cable ferry in the U.S. state of Oregon

Coordinates: 45.30012°N 122.69315°W

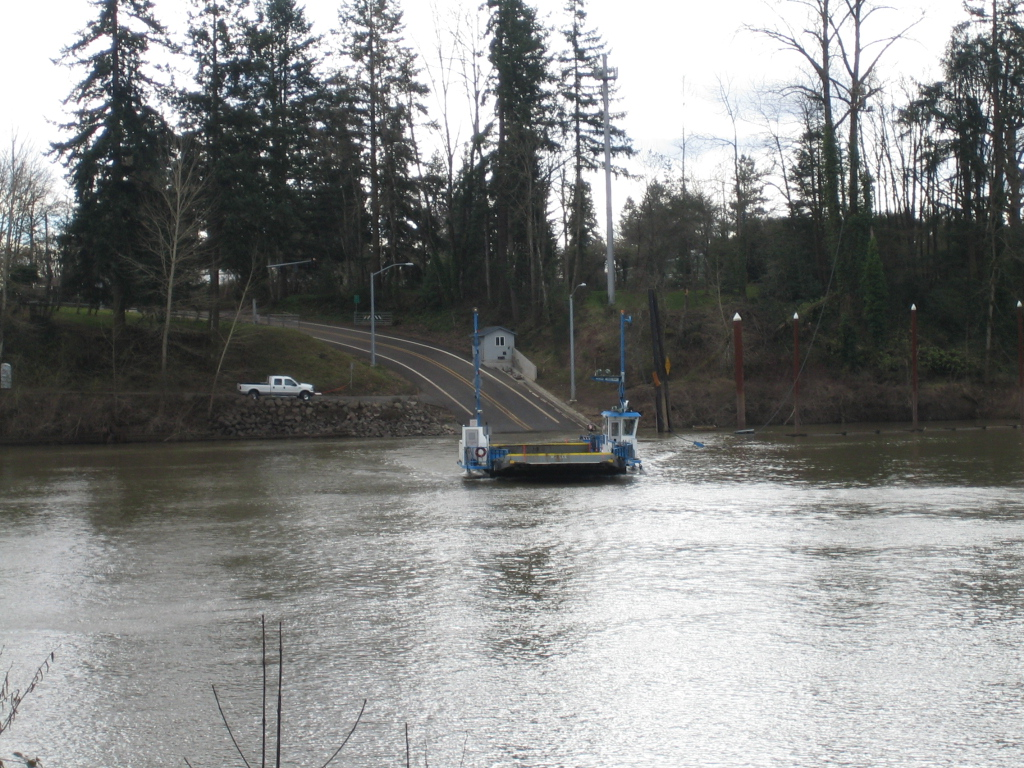
- The Canby Ferry in Oregon, with south bank of the Willamette in view
- Locale: Canby, Oregon
- Waterway: Willamette River
- Transit type: Electric cable ferry
- Route: Locust Street (to the south); Mountain Road (to the north)
- Carries: Motor vehicles, bicycles, pedestrians
- Operator: Clackamas County, Oregon
- Began operation: 1914
- Travel time: 3 minutes
- No. of vessels: 1 (M.J. Lee II)
- No. of terminals: 2
- Daily vehicles: 350–400
- Yearly vehicles: 100,000+

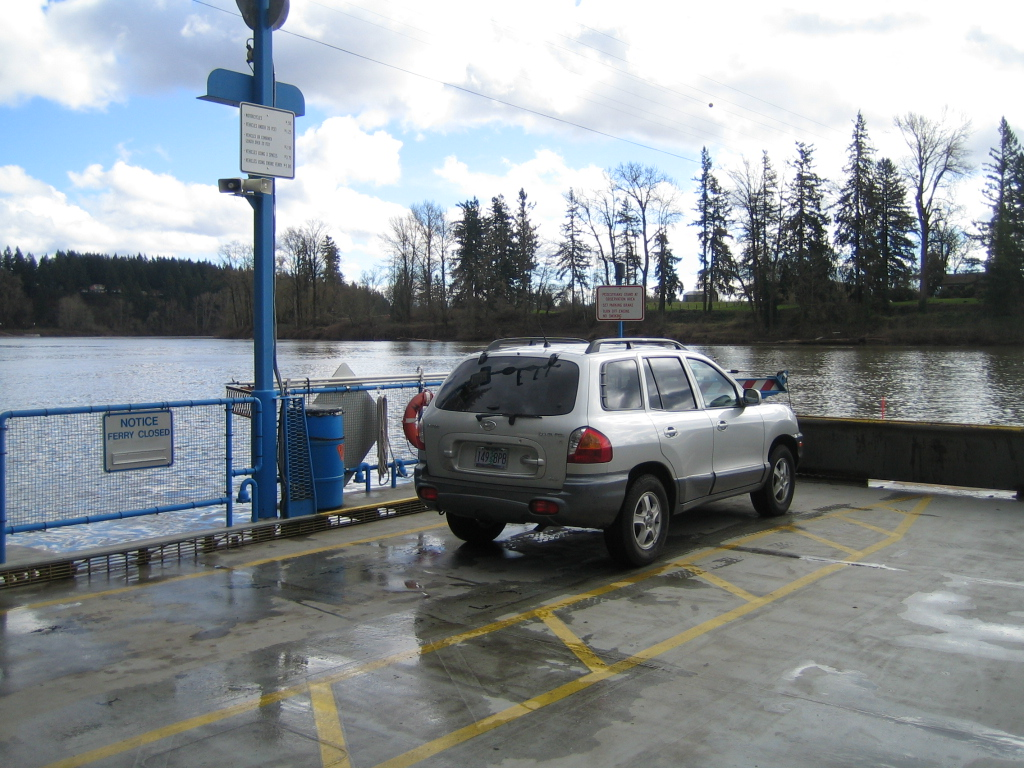
A car on board the Canby Ferry

The Canby Ferry is a cable ferry in the U.S. state of Oregon that connects Canby, and Wilsonville/Stafford in Clackamas County across the Willamette River. The service has been in operation since 1914, except from 1946 to 1953. The specific vessel used has been replaced and updated several times, most recently in 1997. It is one of three remaining ferries on the Willamette River.

The ferry has room for six cars (or 75 tons) and a total passenger capacity of 49. A toll is charged for all crossings. As of July 2017, a passenger car costs $5.00, a motorcycle, bicycle, or pedestrian $3.00, and $30.00 is charged if a vehicle takes up the entire ferry. The vessel currently used, the M.J. Lee II, is a cable-guided vessel powered by electricity with a voltage of 460 volts provided by overhead lines and is guided across the river by an underwater cable 1.25 inches (32 mm) in diameter, leaving the vessel relatively unaffected by the river's currents.

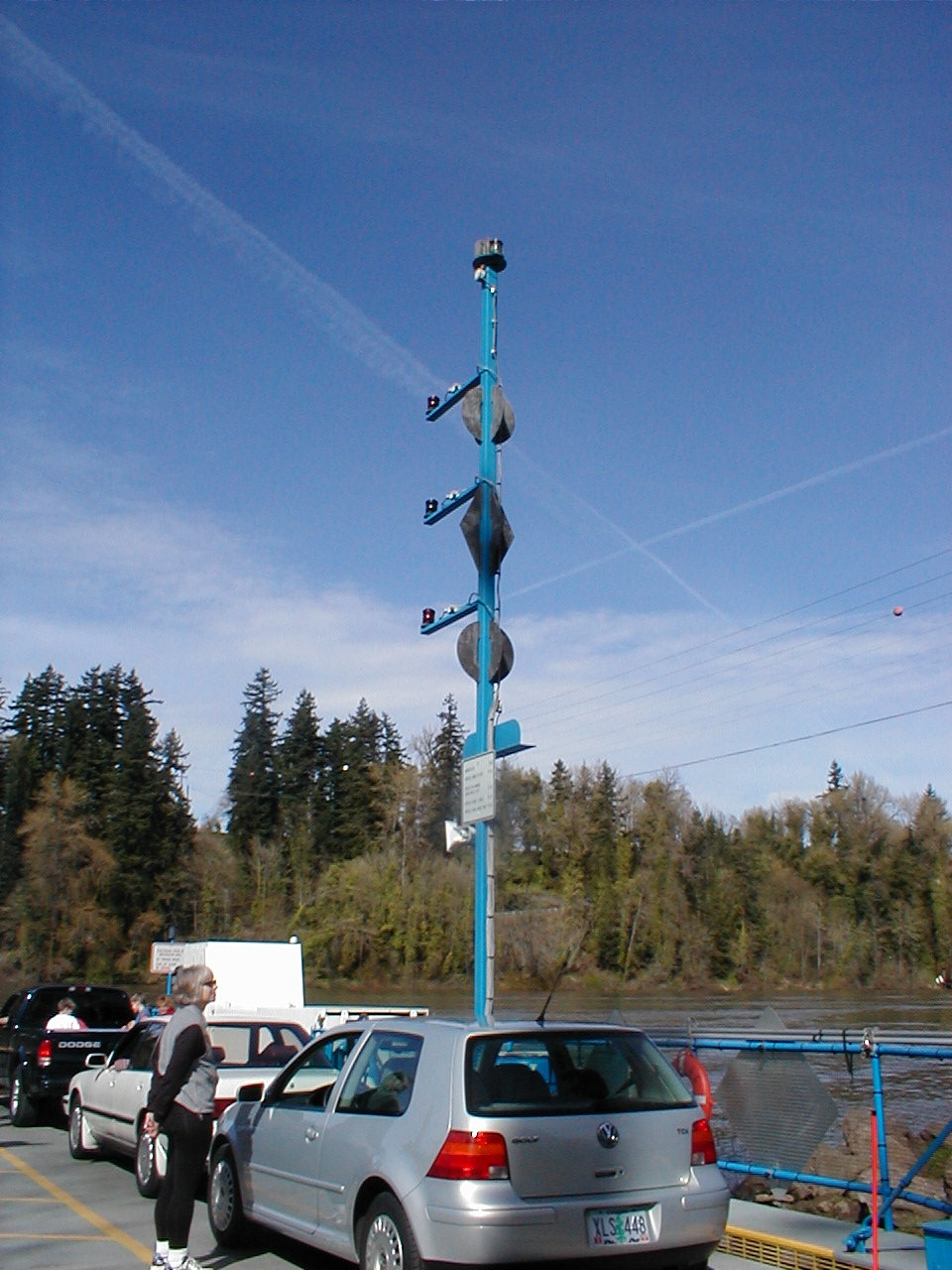
Canby Ferry Restricted Maneuverability Day Shape

The ferry is required by the Navigation Rules to display a day shape and, at night, certain lights that communicate to other vessels its (right-of-way) rights on navigable waters. Because the ferry is guided by an underwater cable, and is fed electricity from an overhead cable, its ability to maneuver is restricted. Such vessels must display the day shape for restricted maneuverability which is a ball, diamond, and ball displayed vertically in the rigging. As the Canby Ferry is permanently with restricted maneuverability, the shipbuilders mounted a metal ball-diamond-ball on a mast. Before sunrise and after sunset, and during periods of restricted visibility, the ferry must display the red over white over red array of a vessel restricted in ability to maneuver.

The ferry is named after Millard Jerome Lee, the first child born in Canby. Lee was born in 1872, two years after the town was platted in 1870. The vessel currently in use, M.J. Lee II, has been providing the service since 1997.

In 2013, operation of the ferry was suspended from January to July, to allow major maintenance work to be carried out. The work included retrofitting the vessel with a new propulsion equipment that is quieter and more energy-efficient – using less electricity – than previously.

== See also ==
- Buena Vista Ferry
- Wheatland Ferry
- Molalla River State Park
- Boones Ferry
- List of crossings of the Willamette River
- Straussee Ferry, an electrically-driven cable ferry in Germany
