= Buena Vista Ferry =

Coordinates: 44°46′11″N 123°08′58″W

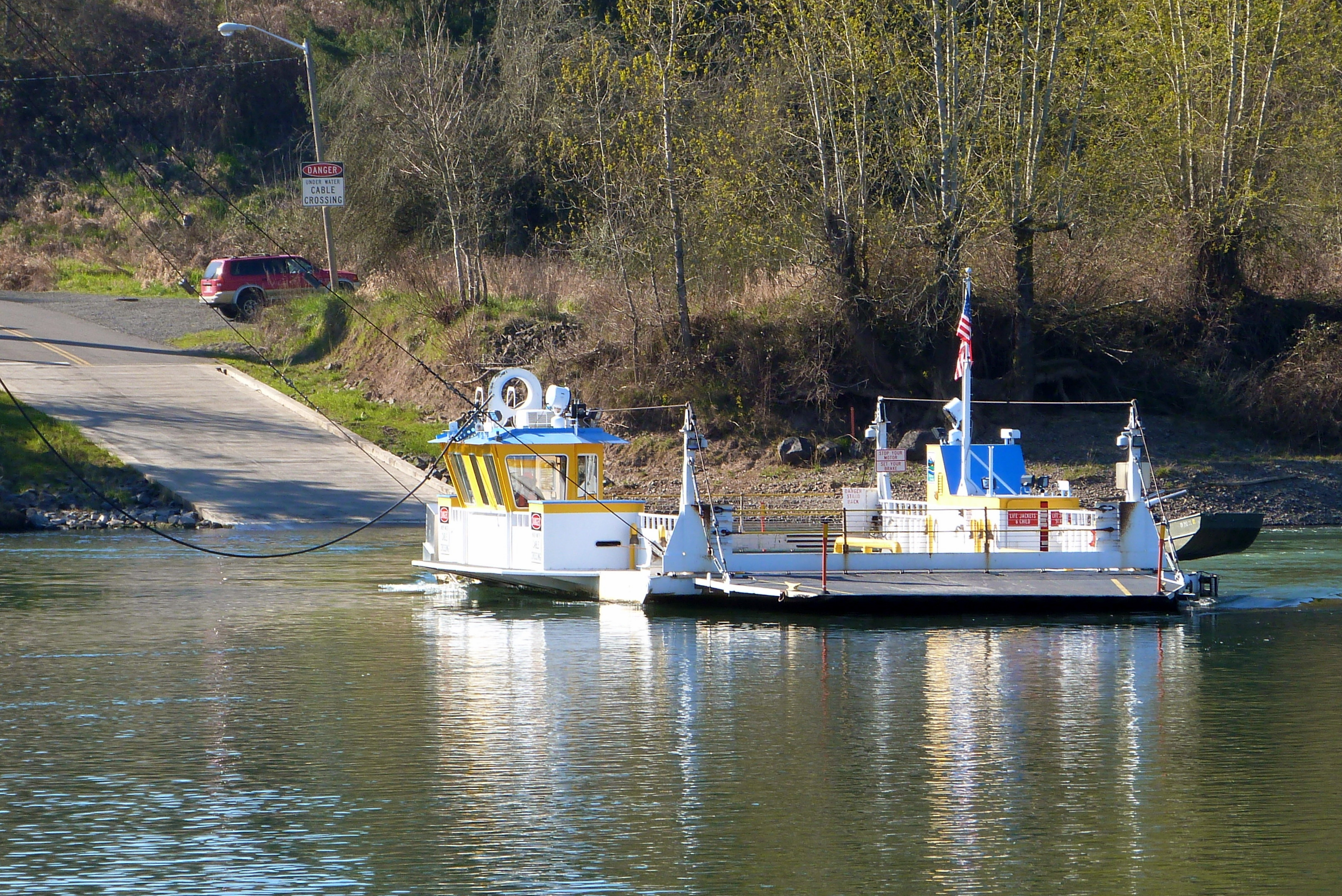
- Buena Vista Ferry from the east landing
- Locale: Buena Vista, Oregon
- Waterway: Willamette River
- Transit type: Cable ferry
- Carries: Willamette Ferry Street; Buena Vista Road
- Terminals: 2
- Operator: Marion County, Oregon

The Buena Vista Ferry connects Marion County and Polk County across the Willamette River in the U.S. state of Oregon. It is located a few miles south of Independence, near the community of Buena Vista. The river is approximately 720 feet (220 m) wide at the crossing. The cable ferry has a capacity of six vehicles.

The ferry is open 7 a.m. to 5:30 p.m., seven days a week.

Buena Vista Ferry is electrically powered with three-phase AC with a frequency of 60 Hertz and a voltage of 480 volts. The power is delivered by a three-conductor overhead wire .

== History ==
In 2011, the ferry was replaced with a new one paid for in part by federal stimulus funds. The new vessel allows the ferry to operate year-round; formerly it only ran from April to October.

== See also ==
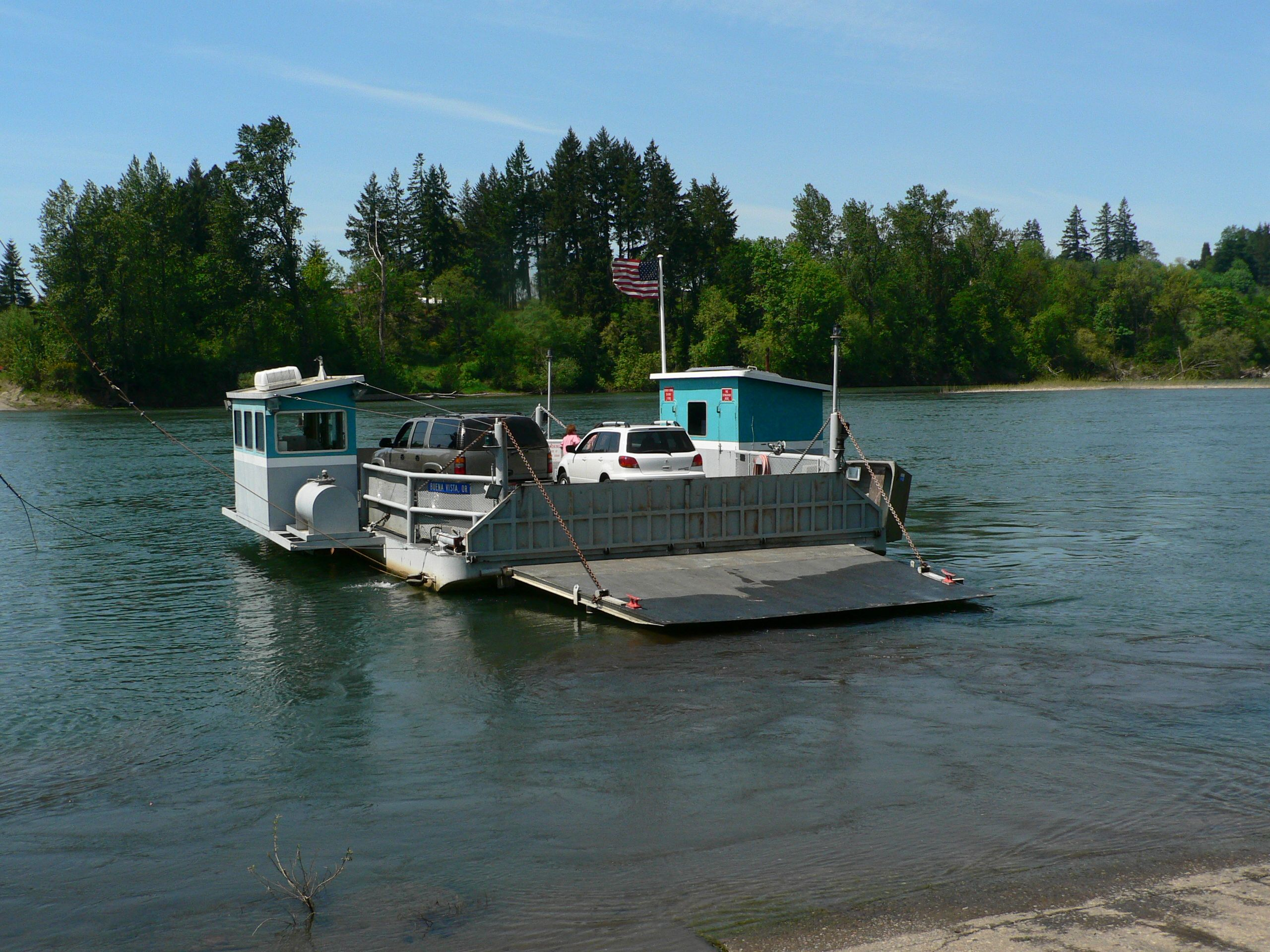
The previous ferry decommissioned in 2011

Canby Ferry and Wheatland Ferry are the state's other two ferries across the Willamette River.

- Historic ferries in Oregon
