= TNT Creek =

- Location of the mouth of TNT Creek in Oregon
- Etymology: For TNT bucked off by a pack mule near the creek

Location
- Country: United States
- State: Oregon
- County: Lane

Physical characteristics
- Source
  - location: Willamette National Forest
  - coordinates: 43°38′16″N 122°15′44″W
  - elevation: 4,814 ft (1,467 m)
- Mouth: Hills Creek
  - coordinates: 43°37′48″N 122°16′50″W
  - elevation: 2,556 ft (779 m)

TNT Creek is a small tributary of Hills Creek in Lane County, in the U.S. state of Oregon. It enters the larger stream about 10.5 miles (16.9 km) above its confluence with the Middle Fork Willamette River at Hills Creek Reservoir.

TNT Creek was named for an incident by a United States Forest Service ranger's mule that threw off a load of trinitrotoluene (TNT) by the creek.

== See also ==
- List of rivers of Oregon
