= Garoutte Creek =

- Location of the mouth of Garoutte Creek in Oregon
- Etymology: For S. P. Garoutte, who found cinnabar on Black Butte in the 1890s

Location
- Country: United States
- State: Oregon
- County: Lane

Physical characteristics
- Source: Calapooya Mountains
  - location: near the border with Douglas County
  - coordinates: 43°32′47″N 123°06′20″W
  - elevation: 1,743 ft (531 m)
- Mouth: Little River
  - location: near Black Butte
  - coordinates: 43°34′03″N 123°04′34″W
  - elevation: 1,138 ft (347 m)

Garoutte Creek is a tributary of the Little River in the U.S. state of Oregon. Rising along the Calapooya Divide near the border between Lane and Douglas counties, it flows generally northeast to meet the larger stream near Black Butte. The butte is a dark-colored mountain, the site of a former mine, and the site of a former post office. Little River joins Big River a few miles downstream to form the Coast Fork Willamette River.

On older maps, Little River appears as a tributary of Garoutte Creek, also known as Saroutte Creek. However, in 1988 the United States Board on Geographic Names renamed the lower reach of Garoutte Creek so that it became part of Little River. The change rendered the upper reach of Garoutte Creek a tributary of Little River.

The only named tributary of Garoutte Creek is Carlson Creek, which enters from the left.

== Post office ==
The Black Butte Mine, developed by S. P. Garoutte in the 1890s, led to the establishment of a post office at Black Butte. William Harris was the first postmaster, and the office, established in 1898, was known by his last name, Harris. The name was changed in 1901 to Blackbutte. It operated under that name until permanently closing in 1957.

== Pollution ==
In the 21st century, the former mine and the area around it have become a Superfund site. The Environmental Protection Agency is concerned about methylmercury contamination of streams including Garoutte Creek, the Little River, and the Coast Fork, as well as the Cottage Grove Reservoir on the Coast Fork. During its heyday, the mine was the second-largest mercury producer in Oregon. From 1900 to 1957, it yielded a total of 16,904 flasks of elemental mercury; equivalent to about 13 million pounds (5,900,000 kg).

== See also ==
- List of rivers of Oregon
