= Elijah Bristow State Park =

State park in Oregon, United States

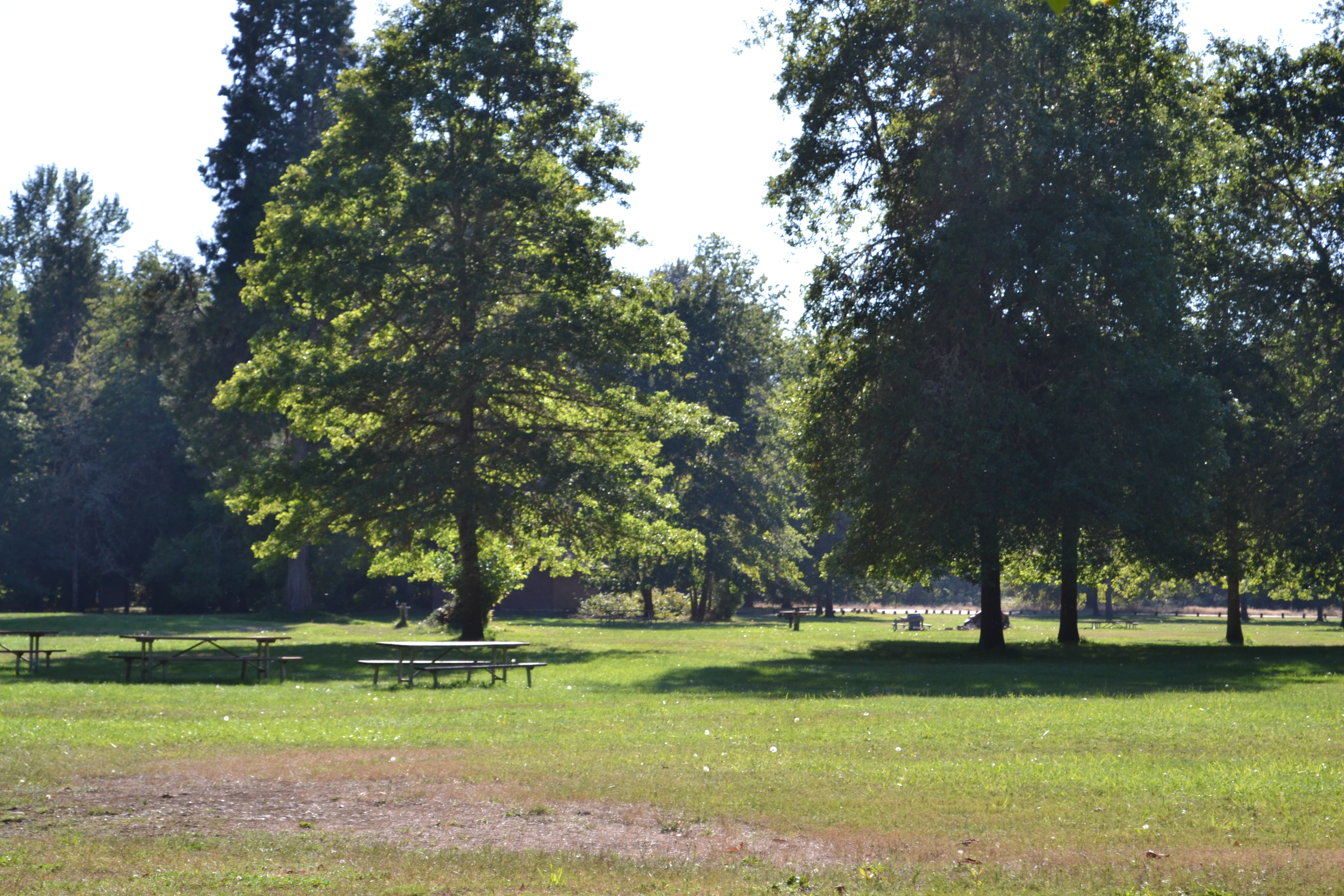
- Picnic area in the park

- Location within Oregon Location within the United States
- Type: Public, state
- Location: Lane County, Oregon
- Nearest city: Eugene
- Coordinates: 43°55′14″N 122°48′44″W
- Area: 847 acres (343 ha)
- Operator: Oregon Parks and Recreation Department
- Open: Year-round

Elijah Bristow State Park is a state park in the U.S. state of Oregon, administered by the Oregon Parks and Recreation Department. It has more than 10 miles (16 km) of well-maintained trails along ponds, wetlands, meadows, and the Middle Fork Willamette River, and through forests of broadleaf and evergreen trees. The trails are open to horses, hikers, and mountain bikers, and there is a separate equestrian staging area popular with riding clubs.

The 847-acre (343 ha) park was named for Elijah Bristow, one of the first pioneer settlers in Lane County. Located directly downstream of Dexter Reservoir, the site was originally called Dexter State Park. It was renamed in 1979 to honor Bristow, who founded the nearby community of Pleasant Hill in the mid-19th century.

The park's trail system includes part of a trail linking Alton Baker Park in Eugene to the Pacific Crest Trail near Oakridge. Named trails in the park include Equestrian, River, Lost Creek, Pond Loop, and Fishermen's, which interconnect "like a tangle of intersecting puzzle pieces".

Wildlife in the park includes salmon and steelhead, osprey, great blue herons, bald eagles and beaver. Among the thousands of species in the park are the threatened Western pond turtle and the Oregon chub.

Activities, in addition to hiking, horse riding, biking, and fishing, include wildlife watching, picnicking, and boating. A wildlife viewing platform overlooks the pond complex in the park.

== See also ==
- List of Oregon state parks
