= Salt Creek Falls =

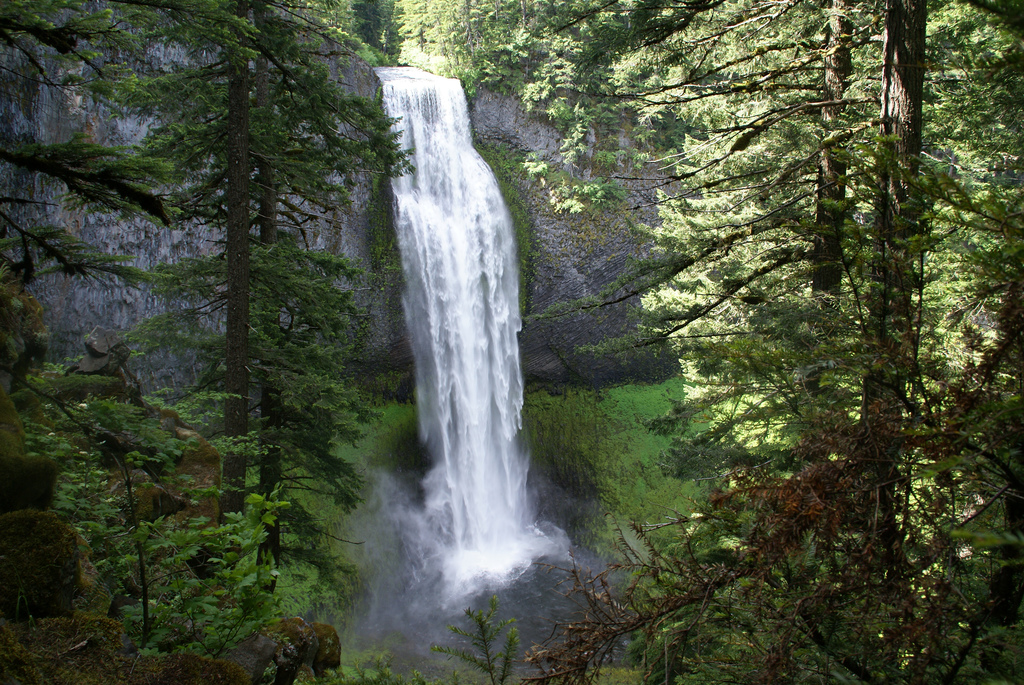
- Interactive map of Salt Creek Falls
- Location: Lane County, Oregon
- Coordinates: 43.61179°N 122.12861°W
- Type: Cascade, Plunge
- Elevation: 3,902 ft (1,189 m)
- Total height: 286 ft (87 m)
- Number of drops: 1
- Average width: 40 ft (12 m)
- Watercourse: Salt Creek
- Average flow rate: 6,684 cu ft/s (189.3 m^{3}/s)

Salt Creek Falls is a cascade and plunge waterfall on Salt Creek, a tributary of the Middle Fork Willamette River, that plunges into a gaping canyon in the Willamette National Forest near Willamette Pass in Lane County, Oregon. The waterfall is notable for its main drop of 286 feet (87 m), ranking third highest among plunge waterfalls in Oregon, after Multnomah Falls and Watson Falls.) The pool at the bottom of Salt Creek Falls waterfall is 66 feet (20 m) deep.

Salt Creek Falls, August 2024.

== Description ==
Starting from 3,902 ft (1,189 m) above sea level, Salt Creek Falls drops about 286 feet (87 m), and this height varies little because the giant boulders at its crest have an even surface. However, a couple of protruding rocks interrupt the fall of water. The annual average flow of water approaching the falls is 250 cubic feet per second (7.1 m^{3}/s). This flow typically peaks when the mountain snow melts in the late spring and early summer. No water diversion facility exists within the falls or anywhere along Salt Creek.

== History ==
Salt Creek Falls was formed when glaciers receded during the last glacial period, and water from newly formed lakes upstream carved a valley through the forest. A main glacier in the Salt Creek valley seems to have deepened this canyon well below the level of the stream's tributaries, leaving those side valleys towering high above the bed of Salt Creek. Lava flows then filled in a portion of this canyon, making narrow walls composed of columnar basalt visible from Salt Creek Falls.

The first recorded eyewitness description of Salt Creek Falls is attributed to Frank S. Warner—a resident since birth of Lane County and settler of the Middle Fork Willamette River valley—and a Warm Springs Agency Native American of Molala ancestry named Charles Tufti, who reported the discovery in March 1887. The falls and stream are named for a series of salty springs downstream that are often used as mineral licks by wildlife.

In 2018, The Oregonian newspaper named Salt Creek Falls one of the 50 most beautiful places in the state.

== Climate ==
Climate data for SALT CREEK FALLS, OR (Snotel)
| Month | Jan | Feb | Mar | Apr | May | Jun | Jul | Aug | Sep | Oct | Nov | Dec | Year |
|---|---|---|---|---|---|---|---|---|---|---|---|---|---|
| Mean daily maximum °F (°C) | 38.7 (3.7) | 40.5 (4.7) | 44.3 (6.8) | 49.8 (9.9) | 58.3 (14.6) | 67.2 (19.6) | 77.7 (25.4) | 77.0 (25.0) | 69.2 (20.7) | 56.6 (13.7) | 42.8 (6.0) | 37.0 (2.8) | 54.9 (12.7) |
| Mean daily minimum °F (°C) | 26.5 (−3.1) | 26.3 (−3.2) | 27.3 (−2.6) | 30.2 (−1.0) | 35.3 (1.8) | 40.7 (4.8) | 46.5 (8.1) | 46.2 (7.9) | 41.9 (5.5) | 35.2 (1.8) | 30.1 (−1.1) | 26.0 (−3.3) | 34.4 (1.3) |
| Average precipitation inches (mm) | 9.46 (240) | 8.02 (204) | 8.34 (212) | 6.91 (176) | 5.22 (133) | 3.37 (86) | 1.05 (27) | 1.01 (26) | 2.64 (67) | 5.79 (147) | 10.97 (279) | 12.16 (309) | 74.94 (1,906) |
| Average extreme snow depth inches (cm) | 42 (110) | 53 (130) | 58 (150) | 52 (130) | 28 (71) | 2 (5.1) | 0 (0) | 0 (0) | 0 (0) | 3 (7.6) | 15 (38) | 31 (79) | 66 (170) |
Source: XMACIS2

== Location and access ==
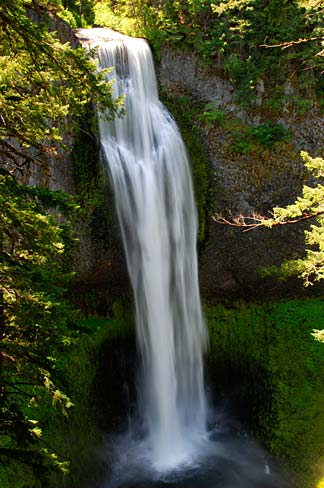
View of the Salt Creek Falls from a trail viewpoint

Salt Creek Falls is situated in the heart of the Cascade Range, in the southern portion of the Willamette National Forest, adjacent to the state-designed Salt Creek Sno-park and to Too Much Bear Lake. The falls is roughly 4 miles (6.4 km) west of Willamette Pass and about 22 miles (35 km) upstream from the creek's mouth at the Middle Fork Willamette River just below Hills Creek Dam. The falls initially descend over a small number of cascades before the 286-foot (87 m) horsetail drop. In total, the falls descend over 87 metres (285 ft).

Salt Creek Falls is easily accessible by car year-round from Oregon Route 58, which connects U.S. Route 97 north of Chemult with Interstate 5 south of Eugene. The day use area is about 21 miles (34 km) east of Oakridge and about 5 miles (8.0 km) west of Willamette Pass. Salt Creek Falls and its surrounding amenities are operated by the Hoodoo Recreation Services. The U.S. Forest Service charges a $5 day use fee, but visitors with a Northwest Forest Pass may park there without the extra fee. There is a viewing platform near the top of the falls, as well as a hiking path down to the bottom.

== Hiking trails ==
The Salt Creek Falls Trail has two moderate to difficult paths—a 3.4-mile (5 km) loop hike and a 6-mile (10 km) semi-loop hike. Both start at the interpretive kiosk in the parking lot and gain approximately 400 ft (122 m) in elevation.

=== Loop hike ===
From the parking lot and to the left of the interpretive kiosk is the beginning of the 3.4-mile (5 km) loop hike upstream of the waterfall on the Salt Creek Falls and Diamond Creek Falls trails. The Salt Creek Falls trail starts with a paved walkway along Salt Creek that leads to a picnic area. Past the picnic area is a bridge over Salt Creek that leads to a faint pathway where the trail divides. Following the right side at the junction leads to about 0.2 miles (0 km) of a quick climb that ends in a wide view of the surrounding canyon. Past this viewpoint, the Diamond Creek Falls Trail continues for about 1.1 miles (2 km) past Too Much Bear Lake and ends in a junction that leads to Diamond Creek Falls, which has access to its base over basalt steps, fissures and boulders.
