= Little River (Coast Fork Willamette River tributary) =

- Location of the mouth of the Little River in Oregon

Location
- Country: United States
- State: Oregon
- County: Lane

Physical characteristics
- Source: Calapooya Mountains
  - location: near the border with Douglas County
  - coordinates: 43°32′33″N 123°01′07″W
  - elevation: 2,333 ft (711 m)
- Mouth: Coast Fork Willamette River
  - location: Confluence with Big River; near Black Butte
  - coordinates: 43°35′44″N 123°04′08″W
  - elevation: 984 ft (300 m)

The Little River is a tributary of the Coast Fork Willamette River in the U.S. state of Oregon. Rising along the Calapooya Divide near the border between Lane and Douglas counties, it flows generally west-northwest to meet the Big River. The combined Big and Little rivers form the Coast Fork near Black Butte. The butte is a dark-colored mountain, the site of a former mine, and the site of a former post office.

On older maps, Little River appears as a tributary of Garoutte Creek, also known as Saroutte Creek. However, in 1988 the United States Board on Geographic Names renamed the lower reach of Garoutte Creek so that it became part of Little River. The upper reach of Garoutte Creek thus became a tributary of Little River.

Named tributaries of Little River from source to mouth are Weyerhaeuser Creek, which enters from the right; Cinnabar Creek, left; Trail Creek, right; Garoutte and Blood creeks, left; and Dennis Creek, right.

== Post office ==
The Black Butte Mine, developed by S. P. Garoutte in the 1890s, led to the establishment of a post office at Black Butte. William Harris was the first postmaster, and the office, established in 1898, was known by his last name, Harris. The name was changed in 1901 to Blackbutte. It operated under that name until permanently closing in 1957.

== Pollution ==
In the 21st century, the former mine and the area around it have become a Superfund site. The Environmental Protection Agency is concerned about methylmercury contamination of streams including Garoutte Creek, the Little River, and the Coast Fork, as well as the Cottage Grove Reservoir on the Coast Fork. During its heyday, the mine was the second-largest mercury producer in Oregon. From 1900 to 1957, it yielded a total of 16,904 flasks of elemental mercury; equivalent to about 13 million pounds (5,900,000 kg).

== See also ==
- List of rivers of Oregon
