= Elijah Bristow =

American pioneer and Oregon settler

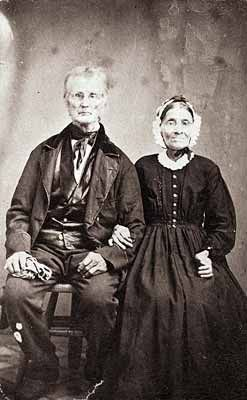
- Elijah and Susannah Bristow
- Born: April 28, 1788; Tazewell County, Virginia
- Died: September 19, 1872 (aged 84); Pleasant Hill, Oregon
- Known for: First cabin built, 1846 in Lane County, Oregon

Elijah Bristow (1788–1872) was the first white settler to stake a claim and build a permanent cabin in 1846, in the upper Willamette Valley, in what is now Lane County, Oregon, United States. He and his wife, Susannah Gabbert Bristow established the first church and donated land for the first school in Pleasant Hill.

== Early life ==
Of English descent, Elijah Bristow was the eldest child of James Bristow and Delilah Elkins. He was born April 28, 1788, in the mountains of Tazewell County, Virginia. He became an expert marksman and hunter, serving in both the War of 1812 under General Andrew Jackson, and in the Black Hawk War. Historical narratives describe his spirit of adventure and his love for frontier life. He sought adventure as a young man, moving first to Overton County, Tennessee, where he married Susannah Gabbert in 1812; then to Cumberland County, Kentucky, in 1819 or 1820; then to Macoupin County, Illinois, and McDonough County, Illinois, where his family lived about 23 years. Bristow left his family in Blandinsville, Illinois, for the Pacific Coast in the spring of 1845.

== Pioneering in Oregon ==
Crossing the plains by ox team, 58-year-old Bristow spent the winter of 1845 at Sutter's Fort, California, and in June 1846, set out by pony riding north with William Dodson, Felix Scott, and Eugene Skinner on an Indian trail that is now the old territorial road. They passed through the Siuslaw valley near the present day sites of Lorane, Crow, Elmira and Monroe, to Rickreall. The company traveled the east side of the Willamette Valley near present-day Salem, south to where the town of Jasper is presently located, and forded the Middle Fork Willamette River to the south side, seeing "a low ridge covered with scattering oak trees with timbered mountains rising above it." Bristow is reported to have risen in his stirrups, and said, "There I will take my claim; and I am going to name it Pleasant Hill. That ridge with the mountains in the background reminds me of my boyhood home in old Virginia."

At Bristow's request, "the first territorial legislature passed an act naming his donation claim of 640 acres, Pleasant Hill." His was the first claim and permanent cabin built in what would eventually become Lane County. (Donald McKenzie built a trapper's shack near the confluence of the McKenzie and Willamette rivers before 1825, but it was not a permanent residence.) The completion of Bristow's cabin by about October 1, 1846, marked the end of the exploration period and beginnings of settlement of the southern Willamette Valley, which had previously been visited exclusively by trappers, hunters, and explorers.

Others settled nearby, and by 1848, the settlers had brief conflicts with some Klamath and Klickitat people. Bristow's family joined him in 1848, after he had written 15 letters, one to each of his children, inviting them to join him in Oregon. He served as the first postmaster in Lane County, and he and his wife donated land in 1849 for a church and school built in 1853, as well as land for the oldest cemetery in Lane County.

Elijah Bristow died September 19, 1872, aged 84 years. He lived to see Oregon become a state in 1859, 13 years after he built the first cabin in Lane County.

== See also ==
- Elijah Bristow State Park
- Lane County, Oregon
- Pleasant Hill, Oregon
