= Lookout Point Dam =

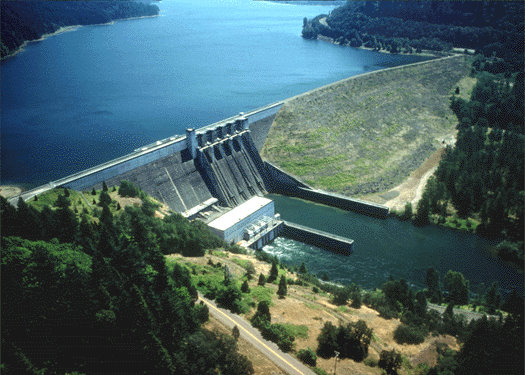
- An aerial view of Lookout Point Dam
- Location: Lane County, Oregon, U.S.
- Coordinates: 43°54′53″N 122°45′9″W
- Opening date: 1953
- Operator(s): Cenwp

Dam and spillways
- Impounds: Middle Fork Willamette River
- Height: 276 feet (84 m)
- Length: 3,175 feet (968 m)

Reservoir
- Creates: Lookout Point Lake
- Total capacity: 477,700 acre-feet (0.589 km^{3})
- Catchment area: 991 square miles (2,570 km^{2})
- Surface area: 4,360 acres (1,760 ha)
- HAZARD- "High" (reclassified may 2023)Population possibly at risk: 200,000+

Lookout Point Dam is an earth-type dam on the Middle Fork Willamette River in the U.S. state of Oregon. It is located in Lane County. Its reservoir is called Lookout Point Lake. The dam's primary purpose is flood control, with secondary purposes of power generation, recreation, and irrigation. Lookout Point Dam was completed in 1954 and is located 360.3 km upstream of the Pacific Ocean

== See also ==
- List of dams in the Columbia River watershed
- List of lakes in Oregon
