= Black Butte, Oregon =

Unincorporated community in the state of Oregon, United States

Coordinates: 43°34′09″N 123°04′39″W

Black Butte was an unincorporated community in Lane County, Oregon, United States. It was located near Black Butte, a dark-colored mountain at the headwaters of the Coast Fork Willamette River, about 20 miles south of Cottage Grove, at the confluence of Garoutte Creek and the Little River. The Black Butte Mine, which operated from the 1890s to the 1960s, was one of the largest mercury mines in the state. Mercury contamination from abandoned mine tailings continues to be a health concern in the area, including mercury-contaminated runoff from Furnace Creek that has made its way to Cottage Grove Lake.

The post office at Black Butte was originally named Harris, after William Harris, the first postmaster. Harris post office was established in 1898, and the name changed to Blackbutte in 1901. The office ran until 1957. At one time there was a Black Butte School; in 1932 the Black Butte School District was consolidated with the London School District.

== See also ==
- List of Superfund sites in Oregon
