= Salt Creek (Middle Fork Willamette River tributary) =

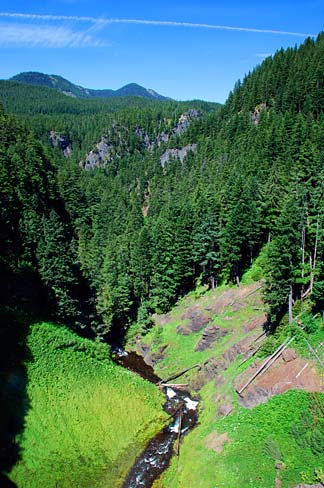
- Salt Creek in the canyon below Salt Creek Falls
- Etymology: Salt springs along the creek that attract deer

Location
- Country: United States
- State: Oregon
- County: Lane

Physical characteristics
- Source: Lower Betty Lake
  - location: southeast of Waldo Lake
  - coordinates: 43°40′09″N 122°01′17″W
  - elevation: 5,481 ft (1,671 m)
- Mouth: Middle Fork Willamette River
  - location: just below Hills Creek Dam
  - coordinates: 43°43′31″N 122°26′16″W
  - elevation: 1,225 ft (373 m)
- Length: 30 mi (48 km)

Salt Creek is a 30-mile (48 km) tributary of the Middle Fork Willamette River in Lane County in the U.S. state of Oregon. It is named for salt springs along its banks that are used as licks by deer. The stream originates as an outflow of Lower Betty Lake in the forested Cascade Range just southeast of Waldo Lake. It proceeds generally south, through Gold Lake, to Route 58, which it then follows mainly northwest for about 26 miles (42 km) to its mouth at the Middle Fork Willamette River just below Hills Creek Dam. At Salt Creek Falls—roughly 4 miles (6.4 km) west of Willamette Pass and a little more than 22 miles (35 km) upstream from the mouth—the stream plunges 286 feet (87 m), discharging an average of 50,000 U.S. gallons (190,000 L) of water per minute, or 111 cubic feet per second (3.1 m^{3}/s). Below the falls, the creek enters a narrow canyon shaped by glaciation and basaltic lava flows from higher in the Cascades. McCredie Hot Springs, at the former community of McCredie Springs, are natural hot springs along the lower half of Salt Creek beside Route 58.

The Salt Creek watershed is a temperate coniferous forest. The primary tree species are Douglas fir, western hemlock, and mountain hemlock. Fish species in Salt Creek are primarily trout, especially coastal cutthroat trout, rainbow trout, and non-native brook trout. The brook trout were introduced into lakes in and around the Salt Creek watershed, and many now live in upper Salt Creek. Bull trout formerly inhabited Salt Creek until damage to habitat throughout the Willamette River basin, such as dams, reduced their numbers in the Willamette's watershed.
