= Hills Creek (Oregon) =

- Location of the mouth of Hills Creek in Oregon
- Etymology: John J. Hill, early settler

Location
- Country: United States
- State: Oregon
- County: Lane

Physical characteristics
- Source: Juniper Ridge
  - location: Willamette National Forest
  - coordinates: 43°34′12″N 122°15′50″W
  - elevation: 5,043 ft (1,537 m)
- Mouth: Middle Fork Willamette River
  - location: Hills Creek Dam
  - coordinates: 43°42′27″N 122°25′24″W
  - elevation: 1,545 ft (471 m)
- Length: 16 mi (26 km)

Hills Creek is a tributary, about 16 miles (26 km) long, of the Middle Fork Willamette River in the U.S. state of Oregon. From its headwaters on Juniper Ridge in the Cascade Range, the creek flows northwest through Lane County and the Willamette National Forest for its entire course.

Hills Creek enters the Hills Creek Reservoir at Hills Creek Dam on the Middle Fork about 3 miles (5 km) upstream from Oakridge. Forest Road 23 (Hills Creek Road) runs roughly parallel to the creek for most of its length.

Hills Creek was named for John J. Hill, who settled near the mouth of the creek in 1870. The dam and lake take their names from the creek.

== Recreation ==
The lower 3 to 4 miles (5 to 6 km) of the creek are stocked with rainbow trout that reach 10 to 12 inches (25 to 30 cm) in length. The stream also supports wild coastal cutthroat trout.

Whitewater enthusiasts sometimes run a 4-mile (6 km) stretch of the creek that has been called "one of the more demanding creeks in the Eugene area". (Eugene is about 40 miles (64 km) northwest of the mouth of the creek.) Rapids vary from class 4 to 5 on the International Scale of River Difficulty. Debris from logging adds to the many dangers on this run.

== See also ==
- List of rivers of Oregon
