= Pleasant Hill, Oregon =

Unincorporated community in the state of Oregon, United States

- Unincorporated community
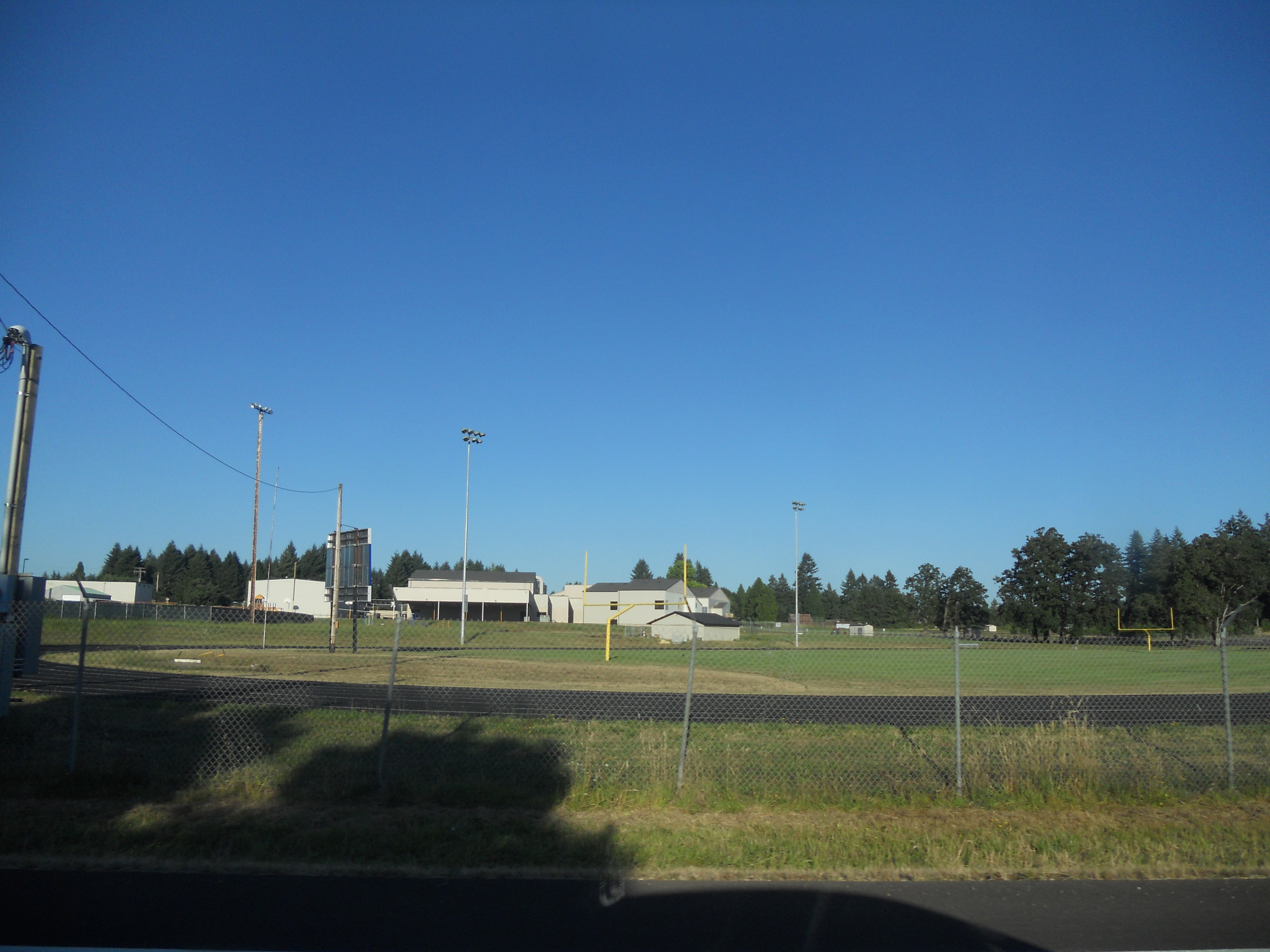
- Sports fields at Pleasant Hill High School

- Location within Oregon Location within the United States
- Coordinates: 43°57′57″N 122°55′54″W
- Country: United States
- State: Oregon
- County: Lane
- Elevation: 653 ft (199 m)
- Time zone: UTC-8 (Pacific (PST))
  - Summer (DST): UTC-7 (PDT)
- ZIP code: 97455
- Area codes: 458 and 541
- GNIS feature ID: 1125471

Pleasant Hill is an unincorporated community in Lane County, Oregon, United States.

== History ==
Pleasant Hill was the first white settlement in Lane County when Elijah Bristow settled in 1846. He was the first of a party of four immigrants to settle, most recently from California. Also in the party was Eugene Skinner, Captain Felix Scott, and William Dodson. Dodson and Scott took up adjacent claims, Dodson to the southeast and Scott to the west of Bristow's claim. Scott later abandoned and claimed opposite the mouth of the Mohawk River, some 7 miles (11 km) north of his previous claim. Skinner made his claim at what is now Eugene.

Pleasant Hill has survived numerous house fires and light flooding in lower areas, but the most remembered flood was in 1996. The flooding resulted in no deaths but many homes were destroyed.

== Geography ==
Pleasant Hill is 8 miles (13 km) from Creswell, in the area between the Coast Fork Willamette River and the Middle Fork Willamette River.

== Education ==
Public schools in Pleasant Hill include the OSAA class 3A Pleasant Hill High School and an Elementary School. Due to decreased enrollment and budget issues, Trent Elementary School has been closed. At this time, grades K-5 attend the Elementary and grades 6-12 attend the High School. Emerald Christian Academy, a private Seventh-Day Adventist K-10 school, is also located in Pleasant Hill.

== Notable person ==
Pleasant Hill was the home of author and counter-cultural figure Ken Kesey, who died in 2001.
