= Big River (Oregon) =

River in Oregon, United States of America

- Location of the mouth of the Big River in Oregon

Location
- Country: United States
- State: Oregon
- County: Lane and Douglas

Physical characteristics
- Source: Calapooya Mountains
  - location: Douglas County, Oregon
  - coordinates: 43°32′25″N 122°53′52″W
  - elevation: 3,288 ft (1,002 m)
- Mouth: Coast Fork Willamette River
  - location: Lane County, Oregon
  - coordinates: 43°35′43″N 123°04′03″W
  - elevation: 1,004 ft (306 m)
- Length: 12 mi (19 km)

The Big River is a tributary of the Coast Fork Willamette River, approximately 12 miles (19 km) long, in western Oregon in the United States. It drains an area of the Calapooya Mountains south of Eugene.

It rises in northern Douglas County, northwest of Huckleberry Mountain, approximately 20 miles (32 km) south-southeast of Cottage Grove at 43.540398°N 122.897840°W. It flows northwest through Lane County to form the Coast Fork of the Willamette at its confluence with the Little River, about 15 miles (24 km) south of Cottage Grove at 43.5953987°N 123.0675727°W

== Course ==
Flowing northwest from the northern flanks of the Calapooya Mountains in Douglas County, Big River enters Lane County about 1 mile (1.6 km) downstream from the source. Box Canyon enters from the right at about river mile (RM) 9 or river kilometer (RK) 14. Big River receives Boulder Creek from the left, then Edwards Creek enters from the right at about RM 6 (RK 10). After receiving Bar Creek from the left and Martin Creek from the right, Big River meets Little River to form the Coast Fork Willamette River about 40 miles (64 km) from where the larger stream meets the Middle Fork Willamette River to form the Willamette River.

== See also ==
- List of rivers of Oregon
