= Diamond Creek Falls =

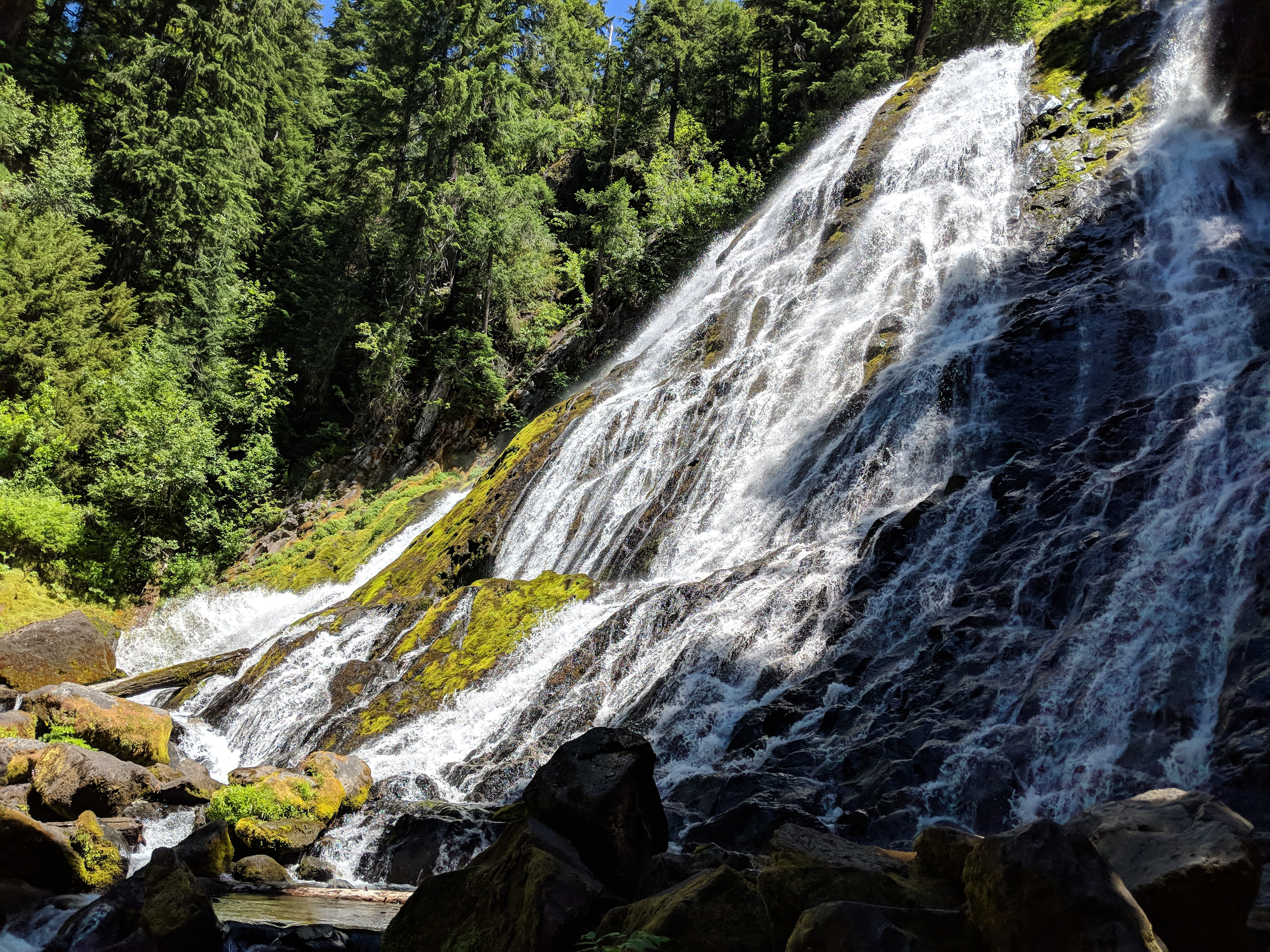
- Interactive map of Diamond Creek Falls
- Location: Willamette National Forest
- Coordinates: 43.60722°N 122.14333°W
- Type: Veiling Horsetail
- Elevation: 4,195 ft (1,279 m)
- Total height: 120 ft (37 m)

Diamond Creek Falls is a waterfall formed along Gibson Canyon on the north end of Willamette National Forest, east side of the city of Oakridge in Lane County, Oregon. Access to Diamond Creek Falls is located along Oregon Route 58 through trail paths that lead down to the stream and the base of the waterfall.

== Trail ==
From the parking lot and to the left of the interpretive kiosk is the beginning of the 3.4-mile (5 km) loop hike upstream of the waterfall on the Salt Creek Falls and Diamond Creek Falls trails. The Salt Creek Falls trail starts with a paved walkway along Salt Creek that leads to a picnic area. Past the picnic area is a bridge over Salt Creek that leads to a faint pathway where the trail divides. Following the right side at the junction leads to about 0.2 miles (0 km) of a quick climb that ends in a wide view of the surrounding canyon. Past this viewpoint, the Diamond Creek Falls Trail continues for about 1.1 miles (2 km) past Too Much Bear Lake and ends in a junction that leads to the waterfall, which has access to its base over basalt steps, fissures and boulders.

== See also ==
- List of waterfalls in Oregon
