= List of Superfund sites in Oregon =

A map of superfund sites in Oregon.

This is a list of federal Superfund sites on the National Priorities List (NPL) in Oregon designated under the Comprehensive Environmental Response, Compensation, and Liability Act (CERCLA) environmental law. There are other federal Superfund sites in Oregon not on the NPL, which are shorter-term, cleanup sites.

The CERCLA federal law of 1980 authorized the United States Environmental Protection Agency (EPA) to clean up contaminated properties and create the NPL list. On this list are the most polluted sites requiring a long-term response to clean up hazardous material contaminations.

The NPL guides EPA in "determining which sites warrant further investigation" for significant environmental remediation. As of April 2010, there were thirteen Superfund sites on the National Priorities List in Oregon. Four sites have been cleaned up and removed from the list; none are currently proposed for entry on the list. The primary goal is to reduce the risks to human health and human health in the environment through a combination of cleanup, engineered controls like caps and site restrictions such as groundwater use restrictions.

A secondary goal is to return the site to productive use as a business, recreation or as a natural ecosystem. Identifying the intended reuse early in the cleanup often results in faster and less expensive cleanups. EPA's Superfund Redevelopment Initiative provides tools and support for site redevelopment.

== Superfund sites ==
Deleted from National Priorities List

| CERCLIS ID | Name | County | Reason | Proposed | Listed | Construction completed | Partially deleted | Deleted |
|---|---|---|---|---|---|---|---|---|
| ORD009051442 | Allied Plating, Inc. | Multnomah | Heavy metal contamination of groundwater, wells and municipal water supplies. | 01/22/1987 | 02/21/1990 | 06/29/1993 | – | 11/14/1994 |
| OR0000515759 | Black Butte Mine | Lane | Surface water contamination by mercury and other substances from abandoned mercury mine site. | 09/23/2009 | 03/04/2010 | – | – | – |
| ORN001002616 | Formosa Mine | Douglas | Heavy metal contamination of streams and rivers. | 03/07/2007 | 09/19/2007 | – | – | – |
| OR7122307658 | Fremont National Forest Uranium Mines (USDA) | Lake | Radioactive contamination of streams, wetlands and creeks. | 06/23/1993 | 04/25/1995 | 09/28/2006 | – | – |
| ORD095003687 | Gould, Inc. | Multnomah | Lead contamination of the air, surface and ground water. | 12/30/1982 | 09/08/1983 | 09/28/2000 | – | 09/30/2002 |
| ORD071803985 | Harbor Oil Inc. | Multnomah | PCB, oil and other contamination of wetlands and lakes. | 09/05/2002 | 09/29/2003 | 08/05/2013 | – | 5/27/2014 |
| ORD068782820 | Joseph Forest Products | Wallowa | Arsenic, chromium and other contamination of drinking water aquifers. | 06/24/1988 | 03/31/1989 | 09/27/1993 | – | 11/04/1999 |
| ORD052221025 | Martin-Marietta Aluminum Co. | Wasco | Cyanide contamination of groundwater and well water. | 10/15/1984 | 06/10/1986 | 12/29/1994 | – | 07/05/1996 |
| ORD009020603 | McCormick & Baxter Creosoting Co. | Multnomah | Heavy metal, Pentachlorophenol, creosote and other contamination of soil, sediment and Willamette River. | 06/23/1993 | 05/31/1994 | 09/27/2005 | – | – |
| ORD980988307 | Northwest Pipe & Casing/Hall Process Company | Clackamas | PCB and other contamination of soil. | 02/07/1992 | 10/14/1992 | 06/04/2004 | – | – |
| ORSFN1002155 | Portland Harbor | Multnomah | PCB, DDT, arsenic and other contamination of Willamette River. | 07/27/2000 | 12/01/2000 | – | – | – |
| ORD009412677 | Reynolds Metals Company | Multnomah | Significant contamination of Sandy River and Columbia River areas, including anadromous fish. | 08/23/1994 | 12/16/1994 | 09/29/2006 | – | – |
| ORD009042532 | Taylor Lumber and Treating | Yamhill | Serious pentachlorophenol, heavy metal, dioxin and other contamination of the soil, air, and water. | 12/01/2000 | 06/14/2001 | 09/24/2008 | – | – |
| ORD050955848 | Teledyne Wah Chang | Linn | Radioactive contamination of rivers. | 12/30/1982 | 09/08/1983 | 09/13/2002 | – | – |
| OR6213820917 | Umatilla Army Depot (Lagoons) | Morrow | Pesticide, NDX and other contamination of groundwater, affecting drinking water supplies. | 10/15/1984 | 07/22/1987 | – | – | – |
| ORD009043001 | United Chrome Products, Inc. | Benton | Chromium contamination in drinking water aquifers. | 09/08/1983 | 09/21/1984 | 12/27/1991 | – | – |
| ORD009049412 | Union Pacific Railroad Tie-Treating Plant | Wasco | Ammonia, VOC, arsenic and other contamination of soil, groundwater and drinking water aquifers. | 10/26/1989 | 08/30/1990 | 09/23/2004 | – | – |

== See also ==
- List of Superfund sites in the United States
- List of environmental issues
- List of waste types
- TOXMAP
