= Emerald Christian Academy =

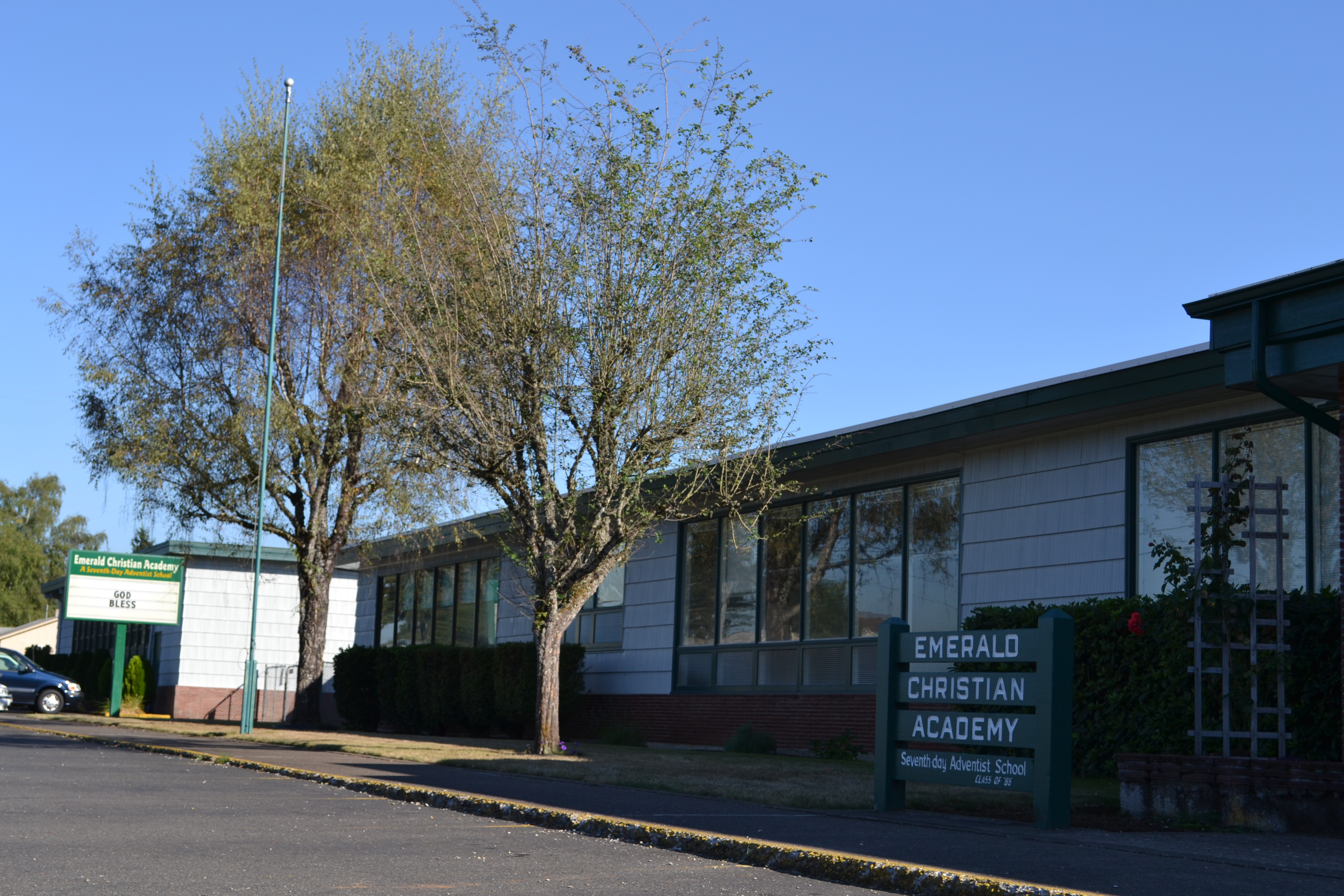

Location
- 35582 Zephyr Way; Pleasant Hill, Lane County, Oregon 97455; United States
- Coordinates: 43.979664°N 122.94873°W

Information
- Type: Private
- Principal: Doug Gaylor
- Teaching staff: 4.5 (FTE) (PK-8) (2020–21)
- Grades: PK-eighth grade
- Enrollment: 58 (pk-8) (2020–21)
- Student to teacher ratio: 10.5∶1 (PK-8) (2020-21)
- Mascot: Roadrunner
- Team name: Roadrunners
- Accreditation: Cognia (formerly Advanc-ED)
- Affiliation: Seventh-day Adventist Church
- Website: emeraldchristian.com

Emerald Christian Academy, originally called Emerald Junior Academy, is a private Christian school in Pleasant Hill, Oregon, United States. It is affiliated with the Seventh-day Adventist Church. Children from kindergarten to eighth grade may enroll. The first through fourth graders are enrolled in the Accelerated Reader system, and sixth through eighth graders may participate in MathCounts competitions.

The school has been accredited by Cognia (formerly AdvancED) as part of the Northwest Association of Accredited Schools since 1994.

== See also ==
- Seventh-day Adventist Church
- Seventh-day Adventist education
- List of Seventh-day Adventist secondary and elementary schools
