= McCredie Springs =

Unincorporated community in the state of Oregon, United States

- Census-designated place
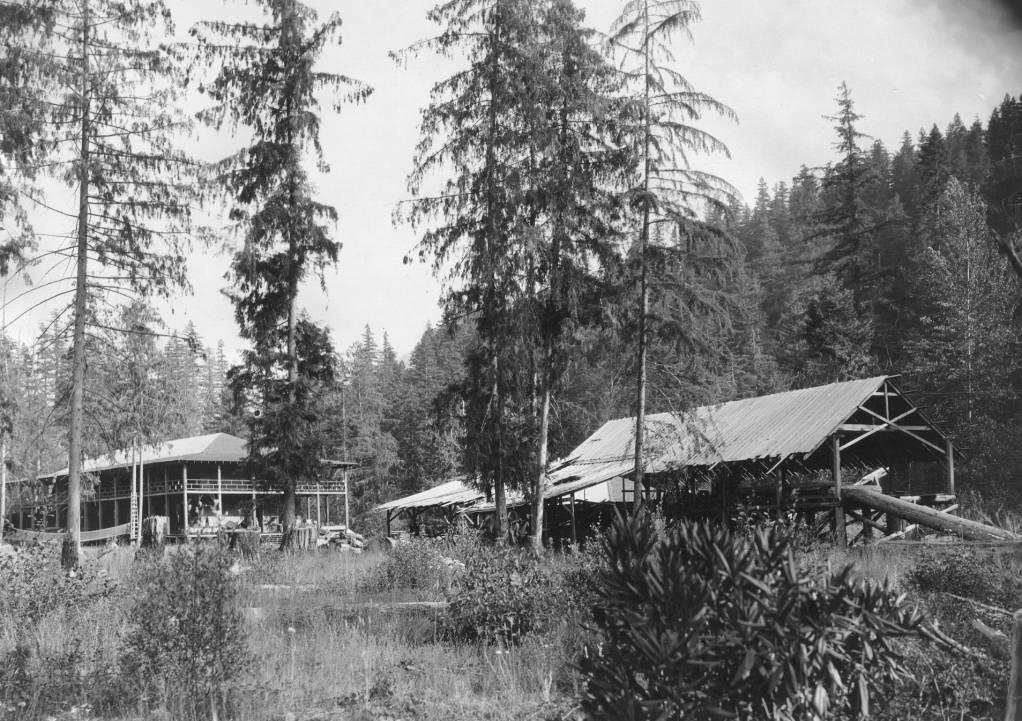
- McCredie Springs Resort and sawmill in 1910

- Location within the state of Oregon McCredie Springs (the United States)
- Coordinates: 43°42′35″N 122°17′20″W
- Country: United States
- State: Oregon
- County: Lane
- Elevation: 2,064 ft (629 m)
- Time zone: UTC-8 (Pacific (PST))
  - Summer (DST): UTC-7 (PDT)
- ZIP code: 97463
- Area codes: 458 and 541
- GNIS feature ID: 1145953

McCredie Springs is a hot springs and a former resort in Lane County, Oregon, United States. It is located near Oregon Route 58 (OR 58), 10.7 miles (17.2 km) east of Oakridge, and 50.7 miles (81.6 km) east of Eugene, within the Willamette National Forest. It is known for the nearby natural hot springs along Salt Creek.

== History ==
Frank Warner, a trapper, came upon a series of hot springs along Salt Creek and settled near them in 1878. He lived in the cabin he built there until he was evicted by the newly formed United States Forest Service (USFS) in the early 1900s. In 1911, John Hardin filed a mineral claim on the land, ostensibly because of the salt found there, but he actually wanted to build a resort on the land leased from the USFS. He named the place Winino Springs and opened a hotel in 1914. William Wallace McCredie known as "Judge", bought the lease from Hardin to build a springs resort in 1916, and established a training quarters for his Portland baseball club, the Portland Beavers.

A post office named Winino was established near Salt Creek on July 8, 1924. The compiler of Oregon Geographic Names believed the name was of Native American origin, but could not find a definition. The office was closed during the time the Southern Pacific Railroad (now Union Pacific) Cascade Line was being built, on December 31, 1925, with mail going to Railhead. The resort came to be known as McCredie Springs. McCredie Springs post office operated intermittently from September 14, 1926, until October 2, 1953.

The Southern Pacific railroad servicing the area was built in 1923. During its heyday in the 1930s, the resort was served by five Southern Pacific passenger trains each day which increased its popularity. In 1940, the resort community had a population of 19, cabins, a hotel, and a store. However, by the later years of the 1940s a new owner converted the hotel and resort into a brothel, thus diminishing its reputation at the time.

The hotel burned to the ground in 1958 and the Christmas flood of 1964 destroyed the bridge that provided access to the springs and damaged the swimming pool. The Forest Service cancelled the lease and razed the remaining buildings. Today, the site remains mostly natural. No services remain onsite, however there is a toilet in a nearby parking lot.

== Hot springs ==
McCredie Hot Springs are hot springs located at 43°42′14″N 122°17′14″W, across OR 58 from the community, by the banks of Salt Creek.

=== Water profile ===
The geothermally heated mineral water emerges from the ground at 20 US gallons (76 L) per minute at a temperature of 163 °F (73 °C). The mineral content includes: sodium, potassium, calcium, magnesium, iron, aluminum, silicon dioxide, boron, lithium, bicarbonate, sulfate, chlorine, fluorine.

== See also ==
- List of hot springs in the United States
