= Hills Creek Reservoir =

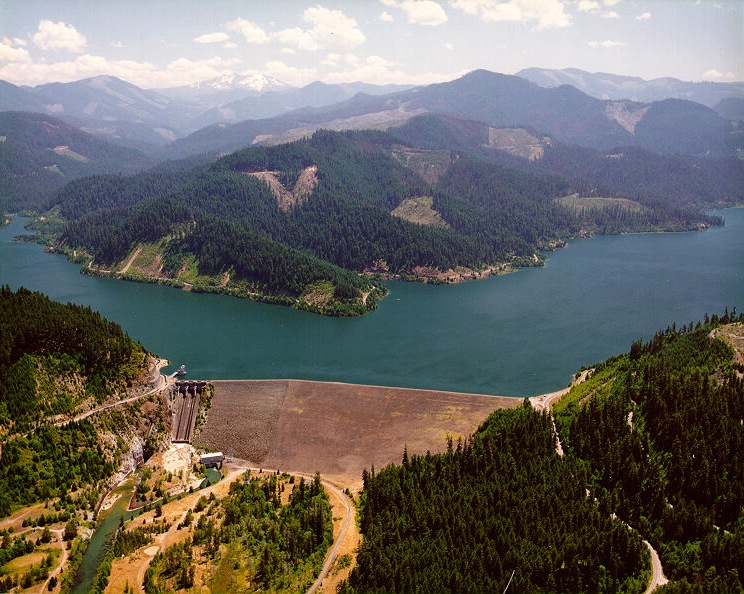
- Aerial view

- Location within Oregon Location within the United States
- Location: Lane County, Oregon
- Coordinates: 43°40′16″N 122°25′33″W
- Type: Reservoir, mesotrophic
- Primary inflows: Middle Fork Willamette River
- Primary outflows: Middle Fork Willamette River
- Catchment area: 389 square miles (1,010 km^{2})
- Basin countries: United States
- Surface area: 2,735 acres (1,107 ha)
- Average depth: 130 feet (40 m)
- Max. depth: 299 feet (91 m)
- Water volume: 356,000 acre-feet (439,000,000 m^{3})
- Residence time: 1.4 months
- Shore length^{1}: 32 miles (51 km)
- Surface elevation: 1,545 feet (471 m)
- Settlements: Oakridge
- ^{1} Shore length is not a well-defined measure.

Hills Creek Reservoir, also known as Hills Creek Lake, is an artificial impoundment behind Hills Creek Dam on the Middle Fork Willamette River in the U.S. state of Oregon. The lake is near Oakridge in Lane County about 40 miles (64 km) southeast of Eugene, at the confluence of Hills Creek with the Middle Fork. The reservoir and its watershed lie within the Willamette National Forest.

The U.S. Army Corps of Engineers created the lake in 1961 when it built the dam, primarily to control floods and generate hydroelectricity. Since then, the lake has become a popular recreation site with parks, boat launches, and a fishery.

Hills Creek was named for John J. Hill, who settled near the mouth of the creek in 1870. The dam and lake take their names from the creek.

== Recreation ==
Hills Creek reservoir supports populations of crappie, wild coastal cutthroat trout, threatened bull trout and stocked rainbow trout, the latter of which average 8 to 12 inches (20 to 30 cm). All wild trout (non-fin clipped) must be released.

The United States Forest Service manages campgrounds, picnic areas, and hiking trails near the lake. These include the Packard Creek Campground, Bingham Boat Launch, C.T. Beach Picnic Area, Larison Cove Canoe Area, and Larison Trail Area. The lake provides opportunities for swimming and waterskiing as well as fishing and boating.

== See also ==
- List of lakes in Oregon
- Tufti Mountain, the summit to the east of the reservoir
