= University of Oregon rowing team =

Collegiate rowing team

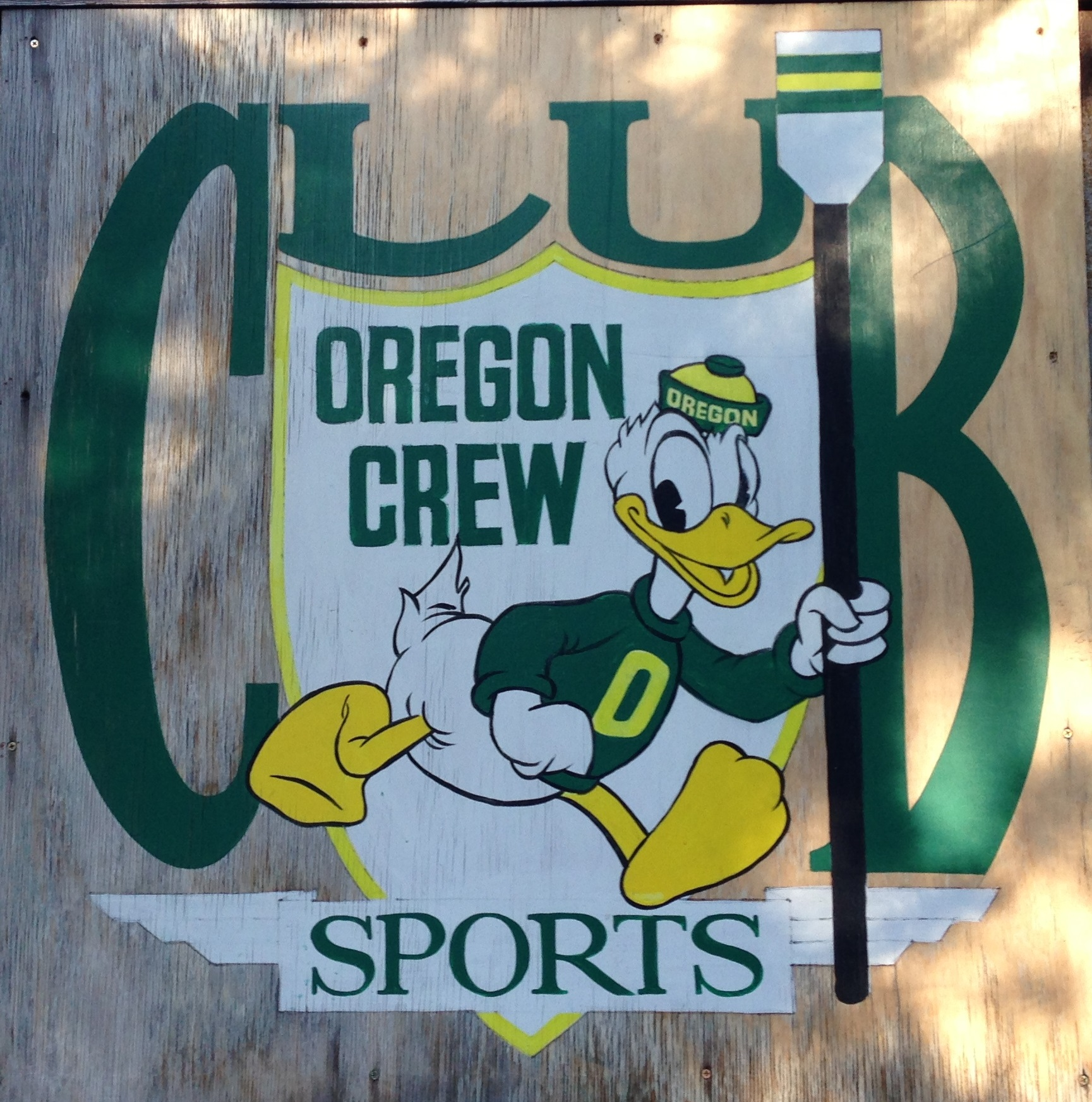
University of Oregon Club Crew Logo

The University of Oregon Rowing Team is located in Eugene, Oregon, and practices at Dexter Reservoir nearby. The team was founded in 1967 and has operated continuously under the guidance of the University. At Oregon, men's and women's teams practice together and compete against other teams regionally and nationally in a number of regattas each year. Even before the passage of Title IX in 1972, the team received national attention for Coach Don Costello's controversial use of female coxswain Victoria Brown in crew, in a previously all-male sport.

Since 2011, the team has raced annually at the end of May in the American Collegiate Rowing Association (ACRA) National Championship.

The University of Oregon Boathouse is located next to the Oregon Association of Rowers (O.A.R.) at Dexter Reservoir. Each year, O.A.R. hosts the Covered Bridge Regatta which is the home regatta for both programs. In 2013, Dexter Lake was named one of the top racing venues in the United States by Row2k.

== History ==
=== 1967–1972: The Founding Crew, Don McCarty, and Victoria Brown ===
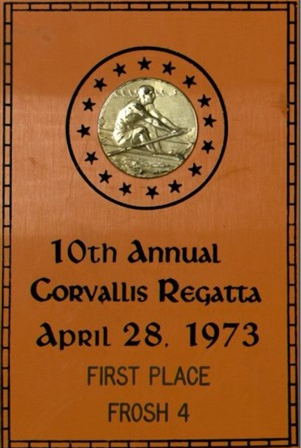
Men's Novice 4+ Winning Plaque 1973 - University of Oregon Rowing

Efforts to build a rowing program at Oregon reappeared in 1967 under the direction of university administrators Don McCarty and Ken Abbey and a founding crew of twenty-two oarsmen.

Oregon State Head Coach Karl Drlica loaned two rowing shells, and McCarty rented a number of shells from Stanford coach Conn Findlay, at cost of $1500 per year.

By 1969 the Oregon Rowers regularly competed in varsity races. The Register-Guard reported, "the University of Oregon had officially elevated crew to varsity status on a one-year provisional basis making it the 10th intercollegiate sport at the school."

Initially an all men's group, because of Oregon's mixed status it was exempt from the new regulations of Title IX in 1972. Despite this, the Oregon Women's Crew was founded in 1973 and the team received significant national attention surrounding coxswain Victoria Brown, one of the first female coxswains to compete in men's collegiate rowing. Traditionally, men's crews relied on male coxswains, and Brown's presence on the Oregon team stirred controversy.

=== 1973–1980: Oregon's First Women's Crew ===
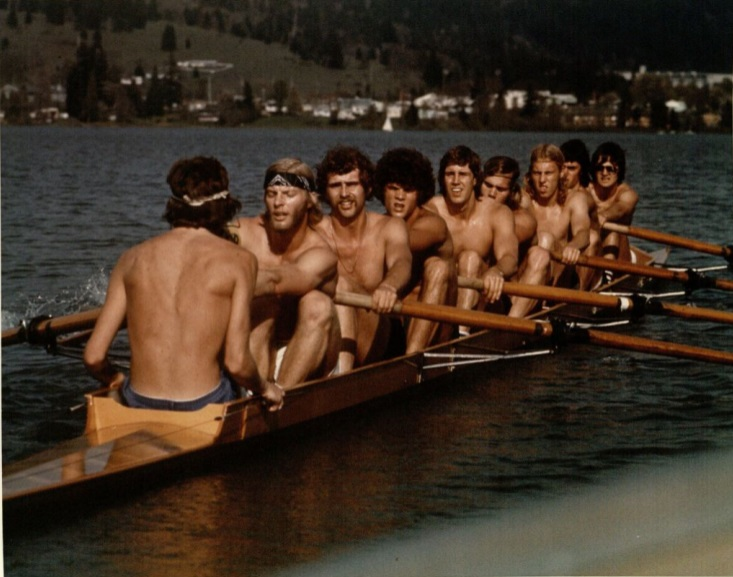
University of Oregon Men's Varsity 8+ 1975

1973 marked an important year for the Ducks because it was then University-sponsored women's rowing. Ralph Neils and Marti Abts had taken over for the men's and women's programs with Mike Napier and Bill Lioio as assistant coaches.

According to the Register-Guard, "The $350 spent on Oregon's first women's crew this year was apparently well spent. The U of O lightweights finished second to Washington in the recent Northwest championships in Seattle. And so did a heavyweight pair, Zanne Pratt and Debbie [Sprecher]."

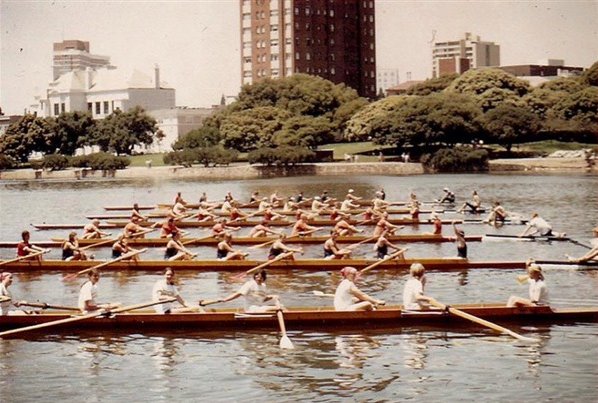
University of Oregon Women's Crew 1973

In the next season, Reed Adler took over as men's coach for the Ducks, and he was followed by Chuck Knoll in 1976. Coach Brian Cole entered the 1968 Long Beach Rowing Trials, finishing two spots shy of an Olympic berth and earning a bronze medal.

Between 1976 and 1980, the Oregon Women's Crew grew. Paul Schultz (Ithaca College '77) coached for two years, amazed at the strength, size and talent that showed up for rowing in the fall of '77. An over-six-foot Olympic-level skier whose career-ending injury on the slopes landed her at five and a woman reflecting her drive at six, there was a boat that won on Green Lake (tho- disqualified for a lane violation) and won in Corvallis. They were all novices, rowing against varsities and JVs, including were Carolyn McCloskey (rowed in high school) and Robin Riordan (rowed in the Pan-Am Games a few years later).

The Oregon Daily Emerald noted, "The University of Oregon varsity crew came up with two surges to hand Oregon State University a defeat... on Dexter Lake Saturday. With Lance Baughman at stroke and Russ Ward at coxswain, the Ducks held the Beaver eight, composed entirely of heavyweights (160 pounds and up) at bay over the remainder of the estimated 2,200-meter course, crossing the finish line in 7 minutes flat to 7:05 for OSU."

=== 1980 to 1988: Our first owned shells, the emergence of the lightweight dominance and a National Championship ===
In 1980, the men and women's crew was coached by Lance Baughman and competed in many of the traditional west coast races. The men competed at the Pac 10 championship at Redwood Shores in a Freshman 8, Lightweight 8 and an Open 4. Most notable, the men's Freshman 8 broke a rigger disabling the shell at about the exact same time MT. ST. Helens erupted.

In 1981, the women were not able to field a team and the men fielded a Lightweight 8 and an Open 4. Lee Wilder coached the men's team and was one of the 1st women coaches of a men's team in NCAA history. The men's Open 4 took 3rd at the Pac 10 Championship with Dane Nickerson at stroke, Joe Meier at 3, Ted Kraines at 2 and Jeff Levikow at Bow.

At the Portland Regatta, The Ducks won every race entered. This included a 2 shell open water deficit at the start of the men's varsity 8 when our 4 man lost his seat and caught a crab. He quickly got everything back in place and the crew powered back into the race with the coxswain calling out the deficit rather negative at start and then becoming more positive and screaming excitement as the crew powered by all crews to win going away. The Oregon Journal published the photo at the finish.

At the Northwest Regionals, the lightweight 4 (Jim Petrosich at stroke, Tim Meier at 3, Scott Chestnut at 2 and Kirk Krasheul at bow with Brenda Thornton at cox) and heavyweight 4 overtook "all twelve of their competitors in the preliminary heats... to win the Championship in each of those events. For the first time in the crew team's history, they beat the Huskies in a varsity rowing event [!]" The women took silver in their light 4. The men's Open 4 qualified to compete for a spot in the National Sports Festival. Despite the light 4's win and faster time at Regionals, there was not a Light 4 event at the Festival.

The men's Open 4 western race was set as a duel between UCLA to be held at Redwood Shores.

Leading up to the final race of the season against a dominant and undefeated UCLA boat, the crew earned the nickname Cinderella.

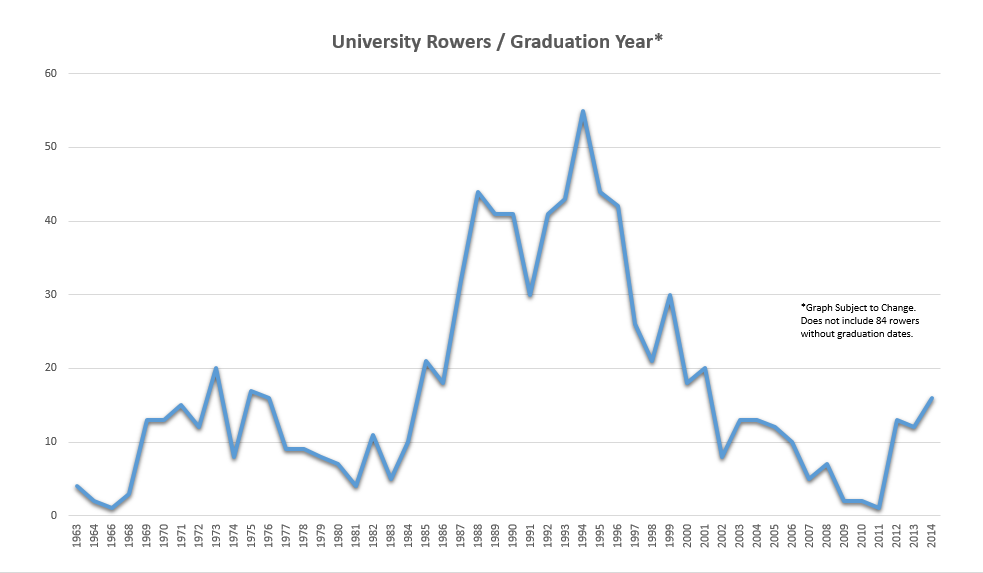
Number of Rowers on the University of Oregon Rowing Team per Year

In an article titled, "It's an unlikely row to anywhere," the Register-Guard reported, "The key to the success of the four seems to be Hugh Watson, the 32-year-old Australian... 'I was rowing before Sietske (Folkens) was born,' said [stroke seat] Watson. [In addition, Sietske Folkens] rows No. 2. The No. 3 man is John Bigelow... the bow is Bryan Andressen... and the coxswain is Brenda Thornton."

Hugh Watson sought out the help of graduate school dean and University vice-provost Dick Hersh. "Hersh... was an old-timer in the world of competitive rowing. After four years on the Syracuse crew, Hersh had been coxswain on the U.S. team at the 1966 world championships in Yugoslavia. He then coached at Harvard and coached two of seven Olympic rowing teams at Mexico City in 1968." When Watson approached him, Hersh was skeptical, "I think he thought that nobody in Oregon could be competitive on a national level. He came out for one row and was surprised at our standard. He's been out for every row since." Hersh explained, "I told them that I felt I could make them six or seven seconds faster than they were, and that they needed to do 2,000 meters in six minutes, forty five seconds to beat UCLA. Well, they did six forty-six and won."

"Oregon crew out-rows UCLA," The Register-Guard reported, "The University of Oregon crew team beat UCLA in a dual race Saturday to qualify for the National Sports Festival in Indianapolis, Ind., July 23–27", adding, "The Ducks completed the 2,000 meter course in 6:46.3. UCLA finished in 6:50.3".

Hugh Watson said, "They were a lot bigger than us, and certainly more experienced. It was quite an upset. It is the most remarkable thing the Oregon crew has ever won." The Ducks were just shy of a medal against "five larger teams from schools that offer rowing scholarships, and four teams from the national Olympic camp."

In 1983, Mike Holcomb took over as coach for both the men's and women's team. Pursuing a loan from the Student Union, the team was able to purchase our 1st 8. Due to lack of trailer, the shell was able to be split into 2 halves and be transported on top of our bus. At the Northwest Regionals in Seattle, we were able to officially christen the shell the Victoria Brown. Victoria was the 1st woman coxswain of a men's crew in NCAA history. The team continued to win many races with our new equipment and had a heated rivalry with OSU's light men's 4 that heated up with the Oregon Crew being cut off by another OSU light 4 crew at the Corvallis regatta. Oregon protested and it was agreed by both coaches that the medals for both races would be settled at the Tri-Cities Regatta the following week. The Daily Barometer, which was OSU's student paper reported the OSU team was seeking their revenge on the Ducks. With 3 lengths of open water at the finish, Oregon smashed the Beavers at WSU.

In 1984, Mike Holcomb coached the men and Tim Meier Coached the women's team. The women's team had a great year in winning many races in both the novice 8 and 4, lightweight 8 and 4. At the Tri-Cities regatta, OSU only beat Oregon by 1 point in the team standings. The Lightweight women won the Pac 10's in Sacramento and came in second at the National Collegiate Championship in Seattle. 3 Oregon women (Gayle Johnson, Teresa Hukari and Marge Kuenne) from the lightweight 8 were invited to train all summer in Seattle for the World Championships in Montreal. Gayle Johnson's 4 took 6th in her event.

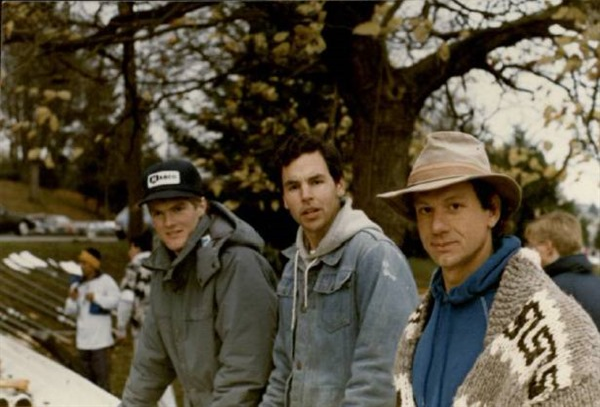
Photo of 1982 Coaches Andy Josa, and Dave Baugh -- Oregon Rowing

1n 1985, Mike Holcomb coached the men and women's team. the lightweight women's team continued their dominance by winning the Pac 10's and placing second in the National Collegiate Rowing Championships.

In a June 4, 1985 article The Register-Guard reported: "In the best finish ever for a University of Oregon crew team, the women's 'lightweight eight' team finished second Sunday in the Women's National Collegiate Rowing Championships. The Oregon unit, coached by Mike Holcomb, lost to Radcliffe, which covered the 1,750 meter course in 5:48.6. Oregon's team clocked 6:08.1... The Oregon crew was Robin Hendricks, Julie Martinson, Teresa Bujacich, Sasha Stone, Margie Bernards, Gayle Johnson, Cate Renfrew, Teresa Hukari and coxswain Lisa Woodworth."

In 1986, Dave Baugh coached the women's team and they again won the Pac 10s and took home the gold medal at the Women's National Collegiate Rowing Championship. The 1st NCAA championship for the Oregon. Teresa Hukari stroke, Kris Sternberg, Sasha Stone, Teresa Bujacich, Kitty O'Doherty, Marge Kuehn, Gayle Johnson, Robin Hendricks and Lisa Woodward - cox.

=== 1986–1991: Jeff Moag and Marty Billingsley ===
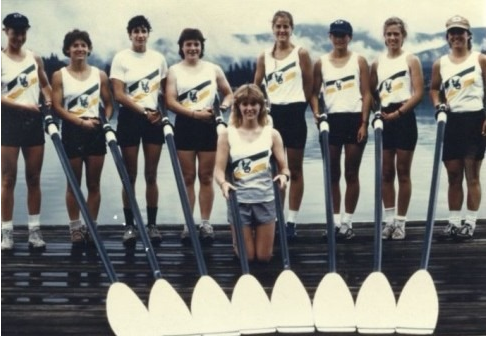
1986 Women's NCAA Champion Lightweight-8 University of Oregon

Sasha Stone join the coaching staff in 1988.

Jeff Moag was the team's coach in 1990–1991. Coach Moag said Marty Billingsley's time was "comparable to the times of rowers in other categories, not only the best in the master's division but among the world's top times." He added, "It's probably a top 10 finish out of everybody in the world." She was Oregon's first World Champion (Indoor) Rower.

=== 1991–1996: Crews under Emerich, Borton, and Busse ===
Morgan Emrich coached from 1992 to 1993, Joe Borton coached from 1993 to 1994, and Phil Busse from 1994 to 1996. Susan Belcher and James Mcqueen were assistant coaches in these years.

The Oregon Daily Emerald reported in June 1993, "The men's lightweight team of the crew will compete for the national championship June 11 and 12, in East Fork State Park in Cincinnati Ohio", and added, "Oregon defeated some of the top teams in the west, including California and Cal-Davis. Oregon must now face Ivy League powerhouses Harvard, Princeton and Dartmouth in the national competition." Despite defeat at the 1993 national championship, the lightweight four had a near perfect season in 1994 winning every race except for their last. The other strong boat in 1994 was the women's novice 8+. Their boat finished third out of sixteen competitors at the Northwest Regional Championship with a time of 7:19.5.

The Oregon Daily Emerald wrote, "the Oregon men's and women's crew teams made a mockery of the competition on Saturday, taking home first place in all but one of their eight divisional races".

The Oregon Daily Emerald also reported, "Aided by a stiff tail wind, the men's novice four team upset the No. 1-ranked Washington squad by a half second in the day's closest race. It was a crushing defeat for the Huskies who had been undefeated much of the year. Coach Phil Busse remarked, 'It was just a great day for the whole Oregon team, the men's novice four race was very exciting and worked out well for us.' "

=== 1997–2001: Crews under Holmes, Gerlach, and Neron ===
In 1996-1997 two crews went to Opening Day Regatta at the University of Washington. The men's boat finished fourth of seven. The women's boat was disqualified after hitting a buoy and breaking a rigger. Holmes said, "I had no idea what to expect from that race, but they were winning at that point."

The Oregon Daily Emerald reported in 1999 that the university was considering upgrading women's crew to intercollegiate status, in order to comply with Title IX. "Such a move has generated mixed feelings in team members and coaches, who say varsity status can be as much a curse as it is a blessing", and added, "Many women on the team now wouldn't make the cut on varsity."

=== 2002–2007: Athletic Department Overlooks Rowing ===
In the fall of 2002 Coach Chris Peters said he was attracted to the Oregon program because the university had, "potential to be a good rowing school. It has a lot of students, it's a large school and it's in the Pac-10." Peters left after one season.

In February 2003 the Register-Guard reported on the potential for a varsity rowing program at Oregon, following an announcement by the University of Oregon that, "lacrosse will be the school's new women's varsity sport", which, "sent waves crashing through the hopes and dreams of some members of the local rowing community."

Yasmin Farooq, a local volunteer coach for the O.A.R. master's program and a former NCAA Champion (1986), World Champion (1995), Olympian (1992, 1996) as a coxswain, said, "It's so mind-blowing to me that Oregon failed to see the potential right in front of them. You put a great coach on that lake, with the athletes that are available in this area alone, and within five years you could have a national champion." Adding, "When I moved out here (in 1996) and saw Dexter Lake, I had to pinch myself, I've raced on some of the best water in the world and I can tell you, Dexter is in the top five in the nation, and easily the best on the West Coast if you consider climate."

According to Oregon associate athletic director Renee Mack Baumgartner, the senior women's administrator for the athletic department, many variables factored into the decision for women's lacrosse. Surveys of the team revealed "women's crew team did not want to be separated from the men's crew team". Additionally, Baumgartner said, "Dexter Reservoir is 21½ miles from campus, while the lacrosse team will play on the field in front of the Casanova Center." Cost was also an issue: "Oregon figures show a $270,000 difference in yearly budget estimates ($530,000 for a fully funded lacrosse program, $800,000 for crew), and estimate a $4.17 million start-up cost that would include construction of a boat house at Dexter Reservoir and the purchase of boats."

Baumgartner said, "Oregon wants to be competitive immediately. California, Stanford, Denver and Saint Mary's College are the only Division I women's lacrosse teams west of the Mississippi River... Crew, on the other hand, is already established at every Pac-10 school except Oregon, Arizona State and Arizona. [Adding] it would have taken a significant amount of time to be competitive." Baumgartner concluded, "I think in the future we will look back and say that we were proactive, we had the big picture and picked the right sport." Farooq responded, "They may win conference championships with lacrosse, but they would have won national championships with rowing."

Despite these success the team began to decline. In 2006, The Emerald reported, "Duck rowers race at Dexter Lake", and "membership in the Crew has declined going into the busy spring season despite starting the year with a large roster".

=== 2008–2013: Carly Schmidt and ACRA ===
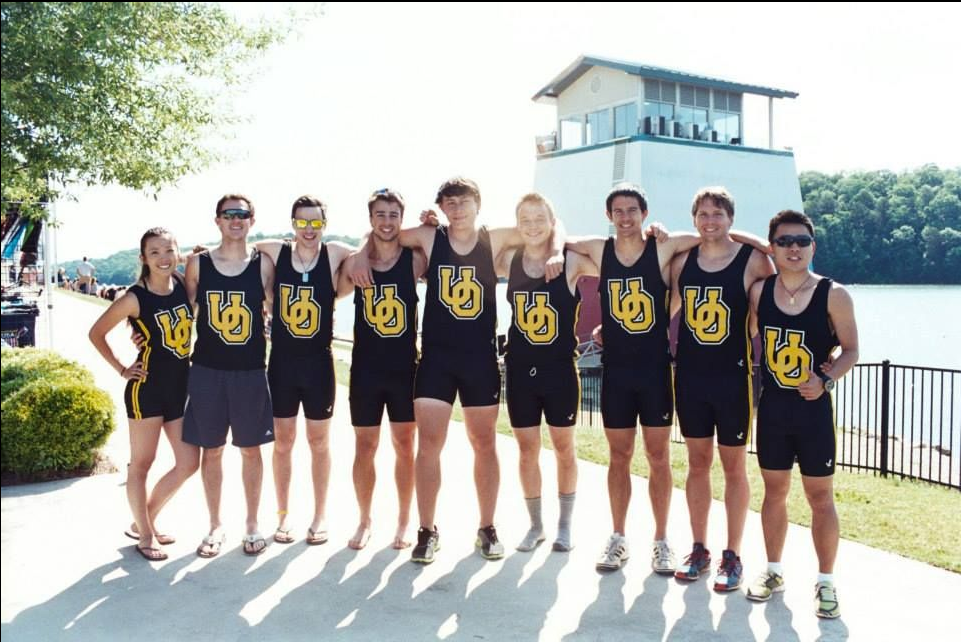
University of Oregon Men's Crew at Lake Lanieir Georgia - 2013

In the fall of 2008, Athletics Director Sandy Vaughn discovered that the rowers had been practicing without a coach. The team found Carly Schmidt, who coached until the end of spring 2013. Under Schmdt, the program attended the American Collegiate Rowing Association (ACRA) National Championships for the first time in 2011. The 2011 team won two medals, a bronze in the women's varsity 4+ and a silver in the men's 1x. In the following two seasons, Schmidt's squads were able to place two more boats in the top 10 at the ACRA championships.

Three articles, titled, "All Aboard," "Rowers respond," and "Closer than They Appear," reported on the team over the 2010 season.

=== 2014–2017: Kindorf Leads the Ducks ===
In the 2013–2014 season under Marlene Kindorf, the team made a number of equipment upgrades through $50,000 in fundraising and donation. That season, the team sent four boats to the ACRA national championships, including a women's novice 8 that placed second in the event. This was just the third medal the program had ever won at the ACRA championships, and the first in an 8+ event in any category.

Over the next four years as head coach, Kindorf's boats would win four more medals, including the program's first ACRA gold medal in the women's novice 4 in 2016. In total, the team finished the four-year stretch with nine top-5 finishes at the ACRA national championships. Prior to Kindorf's tenure as head coach, the program had placed in the top 5 only twice.

After six years with the team as an assistant and head coach, and significant national success, Marlene Kindorf abruptly stepped down from her role following the 2017 season.

Oregon Rowing celebrated its 50th anniversary in September 2017.

=== 2020: Pandemic Poses Challenges ===
The COVID-19 pandemic forced a cancellation of the fall 2020 season, and the team was forced to practice with just one rower in each boat.

== Former coaches ==
Name	Year Associated
Don McCarty	1967–1971
Ken Abbey	1967–1968
Dave Thomsen	1968–1969
Don Costello	1972–1973
Ralph Neils	1973–1974
Marti Abts	1973–1975
Bill Lioio	1973–1975
Mike Napier	1973–1974
Reed Adler	1974–1975
Chuck Knoll	1975–1976
Brian Cole	1975–1976
Mike Johnson	1976–1979
Jim Medlock	1976–1977
Paul Schultz	1977–1979
Lori Huseth	1981–1982
Richard Hersch	1982
Jim Petrusich	1982
Mike Holcomb	1982–1985
Tim Meier	1983–1984
Andy Josa	1985–1987, 2011–2015
Dave Baugh	1985–1988
Sasha Stone	1986–1988
Jane LaRiveiere	1989–1990
Jeff Moag	1988–1991
Morgan Emrich	1992–1993
Joe Borton	1993–1994
James McQueen	1994–1995
Phil Busse	1994–1996
Phil Holmes	1997–1999
Scott Jones	1998–1999
Joe Neron	1998–2002
Craig Gerlach	2001–2002
Chris Peters	2002–2003
Laura Riekki	2004
Galen Mitterman	2004–2007
James Beasley	2005–2007
Brian Shimek	2006–2007
Erin Dury	2007
Marissa Mason	2007
Carly Schmidt	2009–2013
Molly Fales	2009–2010
Marlene Kindorf	2011–2017
Michael Johnson	2012–2013
Trevor Mathwick	2013–2015
Delaney Butler	2014–2016
Robert Maclean	2015–2016
Rachel Boehm	2014
Nathan Sandoval	2016–2017
Spencer Kales	2016–2017
Amanda Smith	2016–2017
Zachary Hedeen	2017–2024
Kathryn Budekke	2017–2018
Hali Meyer	2017–2018
Carlin Otterstedt	2018–2022
Emily Kraschel	2022–2024
Josh Baker	2024-present
Sally Clark	2024-present

== Covered Bridge Regatta ==
The Oregon Association of Rowers (O.A.R.) began working to construct a boathouse at Dexter Lake in 1984 with the support of a $3000 US Rowing Grant. After nine years the boathouse was completed in 1993. The group then organized and hosted its first Covered Bridge Regatta in 1995.

The event traditionally takes place in the middle of April and offers three levels of competition: Masters, Collegiate, and Juniors. The event's namesake, the Lowell Covered Bridge, sits approximately 100 meters from the starting line of a 2,000 meter course running down to a finish line adjacent to the UO/OAR Boathouses. There is a dock which extends out along the course allowing for spectators at the 1,500 meter mark. In 2008 the OAR Masters completed the construction of a $70,000 buoyed course at Dexter. In 2013, Dexter was named one of the ten best race courses in the country.

In 2014, for its 20th anniversary, the event hosted, "Five hundred junior, collegiate and master rowers from 36 teams competed in 44 events" over two days. In 2015, the event is separating into two weekends: Collegiate Covered Bridge on April 11, and Covered Bridge Regatta (Masters/Juniors) on April 18–19.
