= Dexter State Recreation Site =

State park in Oregon, United States

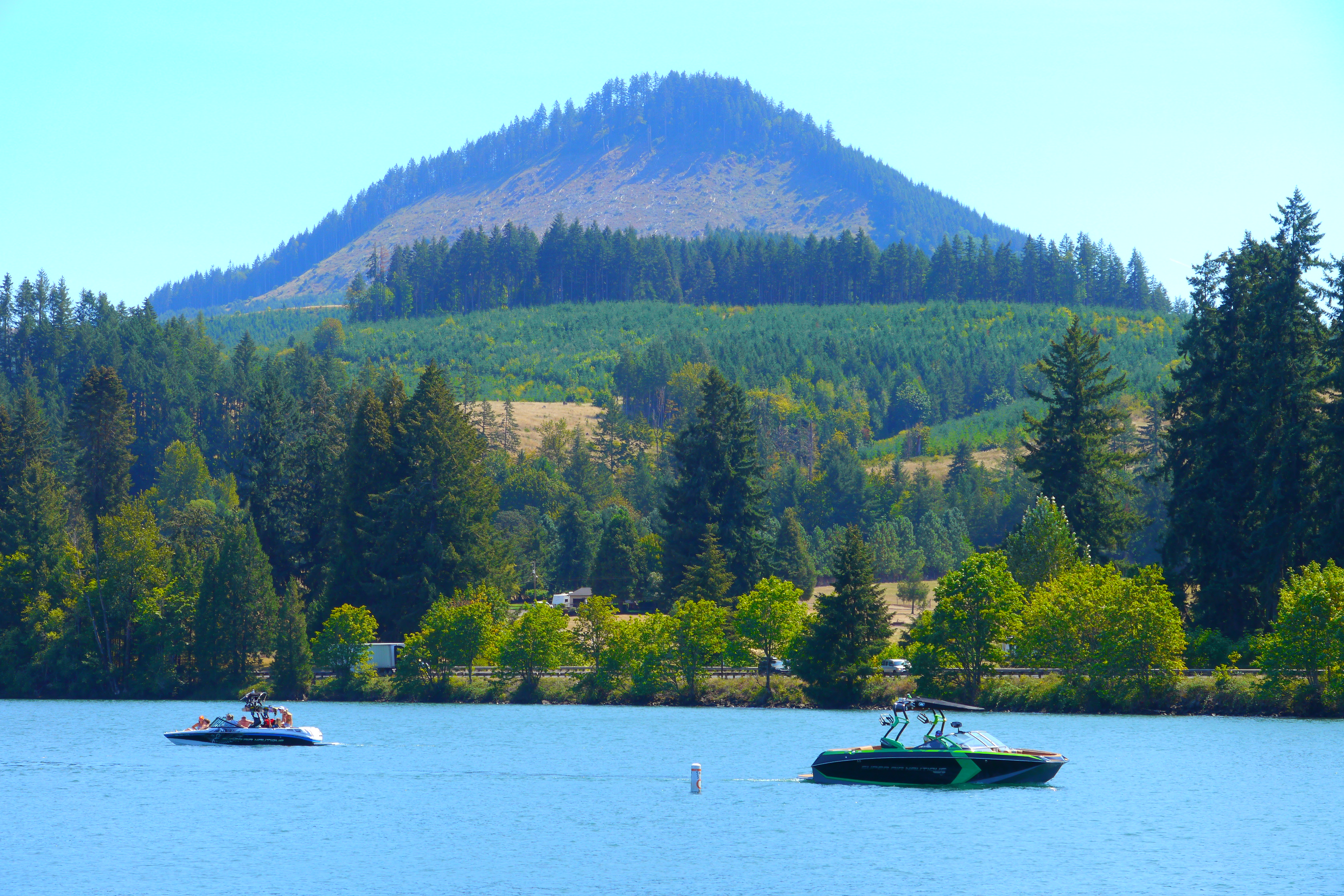
- Dexter State Recreation Site, August 2016

- Location within Oregon Location within the United States
- Type: Public, state
- Location: Lane County, Oregon
- Nearest city: Eugene
- Coordinates: 43°55′04″N 122°48′44″W
- Operator: Oregon Parks and Recreation Department

Dexter State Recreation Site is a state park in the U.S. state of Oregon, administered by the Oregon Parks and Recreation Department.

== See also ==
- Dexter Lake
- Dexter, Oregon
- List of Oregon state parks
