= Hills Creek Dam =

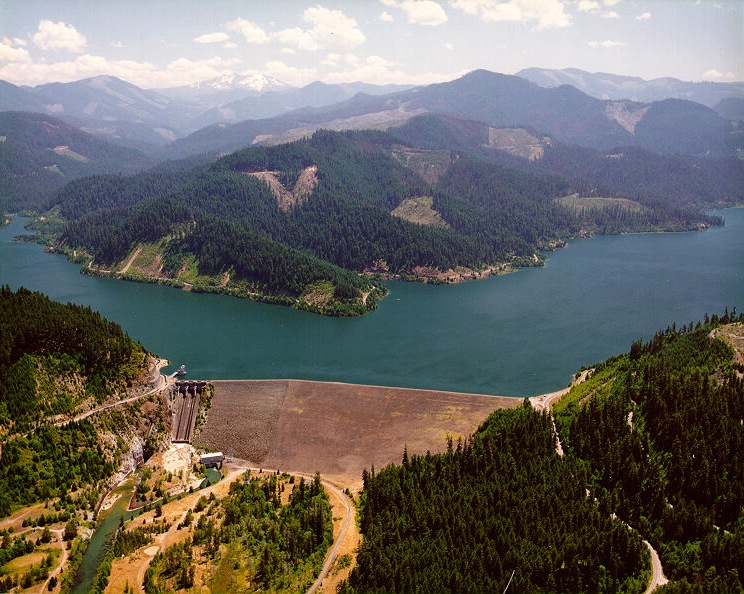
- Interactive map of Hills Creek Dam
- Country: United States
- Location: Oakridge, Oregon
- Coordinates: 43°42′30″N 122°25′30″W
- Purpose: Flood control, Water storage, Hydroelectric, Recreation
- Status: Operational
- Opening date: 1961
- Built by: United States Army Corps of Engineers (USACE)
- Owner: United States Army Corps of Engineers (USACE)
- Operator: United States Army Corps of Engineers (USACE)

Dam and spillways
- Type of dam: Earthen
- Impounds: Middle Fork Willamette River
- Height (foundation): 304 ft (93 m)
- Dam volume: 355,500 acre-feet (438,500,000 m3)
- Spillways: 1
- Spillway type: Concrete

Reservoir
- Creates: Hills Creek Reservoir
- Total capacity: 355,500 acre-feet (438,500,000 m3)
- Surface area: 2,735 acres (1,107 ha)

Hills Creek Power Plant
- Coordinates: 43.693°N 122.392°W
- Operator: United States Army Corps of Engineers (USACE)
- Commission date: 1961
- Type: Hydroelectric
- Turbines: 2
- Installed capacity: 30 MW

Hills Creek Dam is a dam about 4 miles (6.4 km) southeast of Oakridge in Lane County, Oregon, United States. It impounds Hills Creek Reservoir, which has a surface area of 2,735 acres (1,107 ha) and a shoreline of roughly 44 miles (71 km), on the Middle Fork Willamette River.

Constructed in 1961 by the United States Army Corps of Engineers (USACE), the dam's purpose is primarily water storage and flood control, and secondarily for recreation, wildlife and waterfowl conservation, and hydropower generation. The earthen dam has a concrete spillway, stands 304 feet (93 m) high, and impounds 355,500 acre-feet (438,500,000 m^{3}) of water. There are two hydropower-generating units capable of producing a total of 30 megawatts.

The dam is one of 13 USACE projects in the Willamette Valley, including two others further downstream on the Middle Fork Willamette, Lookout Point Lake and Dexter Reservoir.

== See also ==
- List of dams in the Columbia River watershed
- Hills Creek
