= Lookout Point Lake =

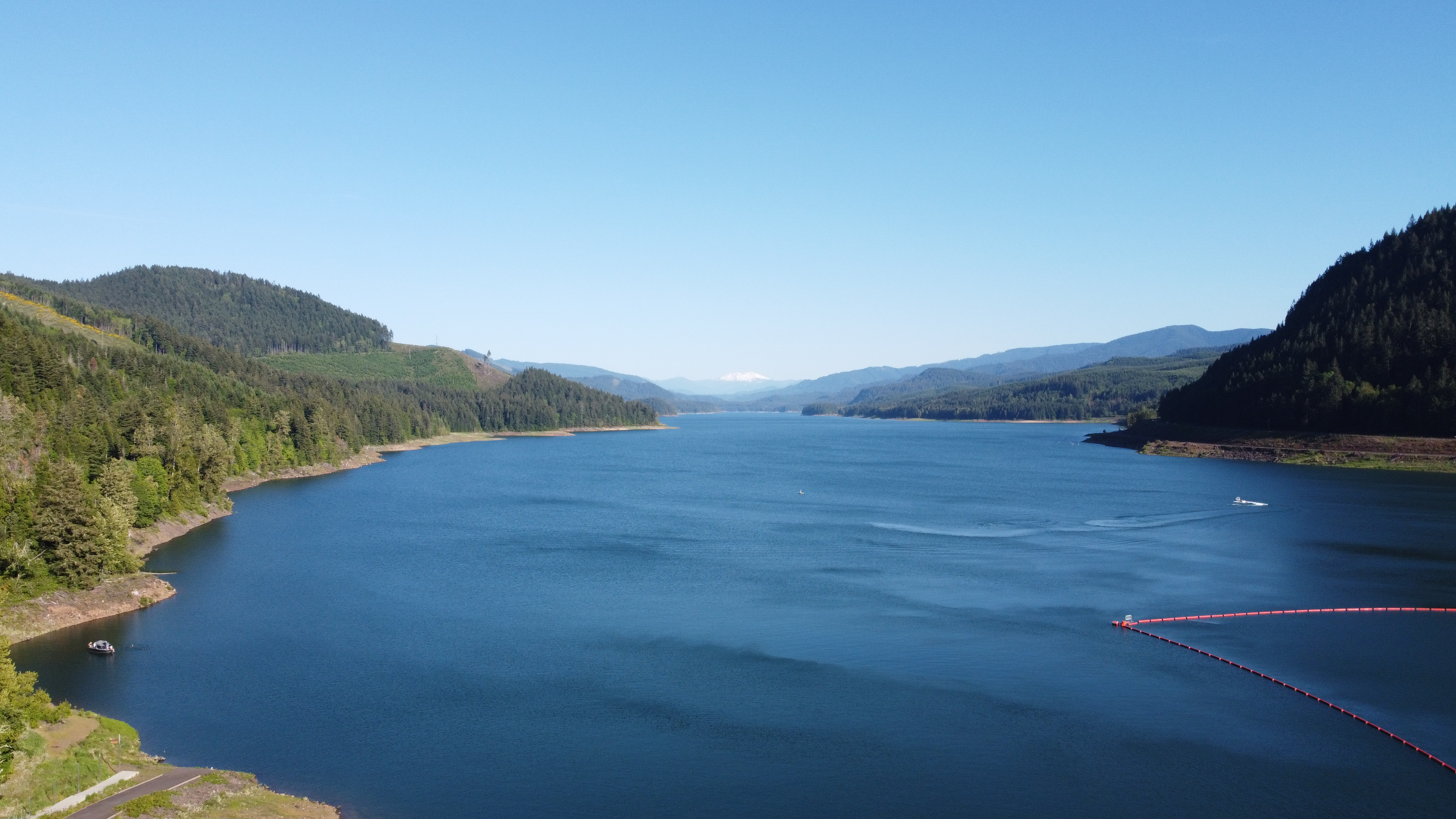
- Lookout Point Reservoir

- Location within Oregon Location within the United States
- Location: Lane County, Oregon
- Coordinates: 43°53′48″N 122°43′34″W
- Type: Reservoir, mesotrophic
- Primary inflows: Middle Fork Willamette River
- Primary outflows: Middle Fork Willamette River
- Catchment area: 991 square miles (2,570 km^{2})
- Basin countries: United States
- Surface area: 4,360 acres (17.6 km^{2})
- Average depth: 104 feet (32 m)
- Max. depth: 534 feet (163 m)
- Water volume: 477,700 acre-feet (0.589 km^{3})
- Residence time: 1.9 months
- Shore length^{1}: 35 miles (56 km)
- Surface elevation: 932 feet (284 m)
- Settlements: Lowell, Oakridge
- ^{1} Shore length is not a well-defined measure.

Lookout Point Lake (also Lookout Point Reservoir) is a large reservoir on the Middle Fork Willamette River in Lane County, Oregon, United States. It was created in 1953 with the construction of Lookout Point Dam.

The downstream end of the reservoir is about 20 miles (32 km) southeast of Eugene. It lies immediately upriver from Dexter Lake, another reservoir. The city of Lowell is nearby, along the north shore of Dexter Lake. Oregon Route 58 follows the lake's southern shore and Boundary Road the northern shore. The lake, about 14 miles (23 km) long, continues upriver to within about 7 miles (11 km) of Oakridge.

Lookout Point Dam, 276 feet (84 m) high, impounds up to 477,700 acre-feet (589,200,000 m^{3}) of water. It helps control flooding, generates electricity, and provides a place for boating and other outdoor recreation.

== History ==
The two reservoirs, Lookout Point and Dexter, were created in the early 1950s, when the United States Army Corps of Engineers finished building the dams that contain them. Dexter exists partly as a re-regulating basin that controls water surges from Lookout Point Lake. The pair of dams work together to prevent downstream flooding.

Both dams are equipped with powerhouses that generate electricity. Lookout Point Dam has three generating units that can produce a combined 120,000 kilowatts of power. Water levels in the dam are usually high from May through August. To supply demands for water downriver, a gradual drawdown of lake water begins in July and extends through September. After September, the lake is emptied more rapidly to make room for high river flows that enter the lake during the winter. The Lookout Point and Dexter projects are among 13 built by the Corps in the Willamette Valley.

== Recreation ==
Recreation on or near the lake includes boating and fishing, camping and picnicking. Large populations of rough fish such as northern pikeminnows and suckers limit the catch of fish such as rainbow trout considered desirable by sports fishers. Strong winds, big waves, and annual fluctuations in the lake level also make fishing more difficult.

Several picnicking and boat launches run by the county, the state, or the Willamette National Forest are located around the lake. Some of the ramps become disconnected from the lake when the water is low, but the ramps near Lowell and the dam remain operational all year. Camping spots are available at Black Canyon Campground, managed by the United States Forest Service, near the southeast end of the lake.

== See also ==
- List of lakes in Oregon
