= Juniper Ridge =

Community in Kamloops, British Columbia, Canada

Coordinates: 50°40′00″N 120°15′00″W

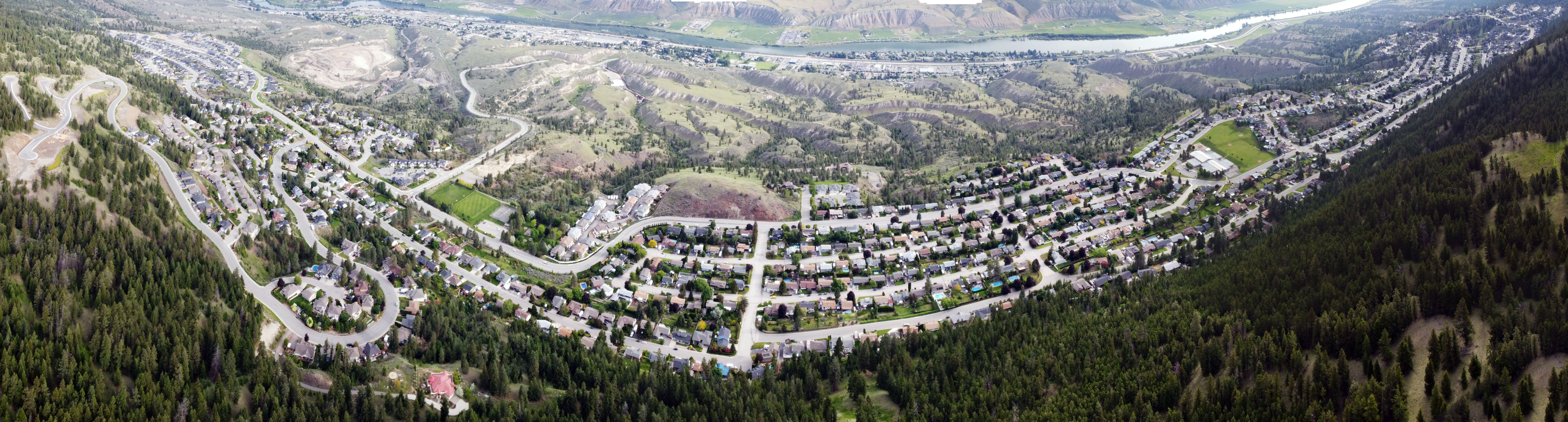
View of Juniper Ridge from the South

Juniper Ridge is a community located in the city of Kamloops, British Columbia. It is situated at the south-east end of the city on a hillside south of the South Thompson River. There is a convenience store at the entrance to the community, and the area is serviced by an elementary school. It is accessible only by one road, Highland Rd.: however, a formerly washed out dirt road has been refilled allowing emergency access to the Rose Hill area. Most of the streets in this neighbourhood are named after rivers in the province, such as: Skeena, Nechako, Omineca, Babine, Coldwater, etc. Tennis courts, an ice rink with bright lighting, and a dog park are located at the local community centre, Juniper Park.

== History ==
=== The Cordonier Ranch ===
Prior to 1971, the 1,050-acre (4.2 km^{2}) Cordonier ranch, which occupied the lands now known as Juniper Ridge, was used as for the grazing of sheep during the spring on their passage from the Kamloops area to Crowfoot mountain in the Shuswap. A highway accident involving a loaded semi trailer and sheep along the highway resulted in restriction being put in place that banned the transfer of sheep along the highway. As such, sheep were prevented from returning to the area now known as Juniper Ridge and this area of the Cordonier ranch went unused, providing insufficient income to both owner and government.

=== The Hesperia Development ===
The beginnings of the housing development now known as Juniper Ridge was originally known as The Hesperia Development Project, with the land being owned by Hesperia Development Limited. The beginning of project in particular was initiated by Brentwood Estates Limited in late 1970. The Municipality of Valleyview (now a community within the municipality of Kamloops) accepted a report detailing the proposed community as submitted on August 4, 1971. Shortly after the approval of this preliminary report, Hesperia Development Limited filed an application with the Town of Valleyview to be included within the town's limits. This was eventually done in March 1972.

=== The Juniper Lands Project ===
On December 10, 1971, The Hesperia Development Project was sold to Juniper Lands Ltd based out of Vancouver, BC. Juniper Lands LTD was owned jointly by Hesperia and Tierra Properties. Subsequently Tierra Properties was appointed manager of the project. At this same time, the name of the project was changed to The Juniper Lands Project. The plan for the development of this land was submitted to the Municipality of Valleyview by Mr. Lawrence J. Rogers, the President of Juniper Lands and Tierra Properties and Mr Alfredo J. Luz of Townley Matheson and Partners on August 4, 1971. At this time, Juniper Lands owned all portions of what is now known as Juniper Ridge with the exception of small parcels along Highland Drive, which, in 1972 provided access solely to Valleyview park.

==== Housing Shortages ====
One of the goals of the project was to provide housing in the Kamloops region which, at the time, was experiencing a housing shortage after an increase in government assistance in home purchases. In addition, all flat lands along the South Thompson River and western banks of the North Thompson had been fully developed at this time. In the original proposal, it was suggested that this community would serve as an example of a self-sufficient satellite community which would be less reliant upon the services provided within the city of Kamloops. This self-reliance, however, has to date not been fully achieved.

==== The Development Program ====
Given that the area was totally undeveloped, the site needed complete survey and engineering, provision of roads, water, sewer, storm drainage, electricity and telephone facilities. As well, housing construction was to be completed in 7 phases which closely parallels the community as it exists today. Land was also set aside for the development of both elementary and high schools. The elementary school was built and sustained classes up to grade 4 until 1993 when the school was expanded to include classes up to grade 7. To date, no high school has been built, and all Juniper Ridge Elementary students take their subsequent high school education at Valleyview Senior Secondary. Land was also set aside for the establishment of hospitals, churches, green areas and commercial zones.

== The Juniper Ridge Community Association (JRCA) ==
The JRCA was formed in 1983 and formed to provide a "convenient and effective method of informing and organizing fellow residents to address issues and to host community events".

== Residential Sections of Juniper Ridge ==
While Juniper Ridge is classified as one subdivision in Kamloops, common areas of the subdivision are categorized based on the name of the development and age of the homes. For example, residents will call newer homes in the West end of Juniper, "Juniper West". Similarly, residents call the newer development in the East "The Benchlands".

== Related links ==
- Juniper Ridge Elementary
- Juniper Gate Strata Complex
