= Dexter Reservoir =

- Dexter Lake
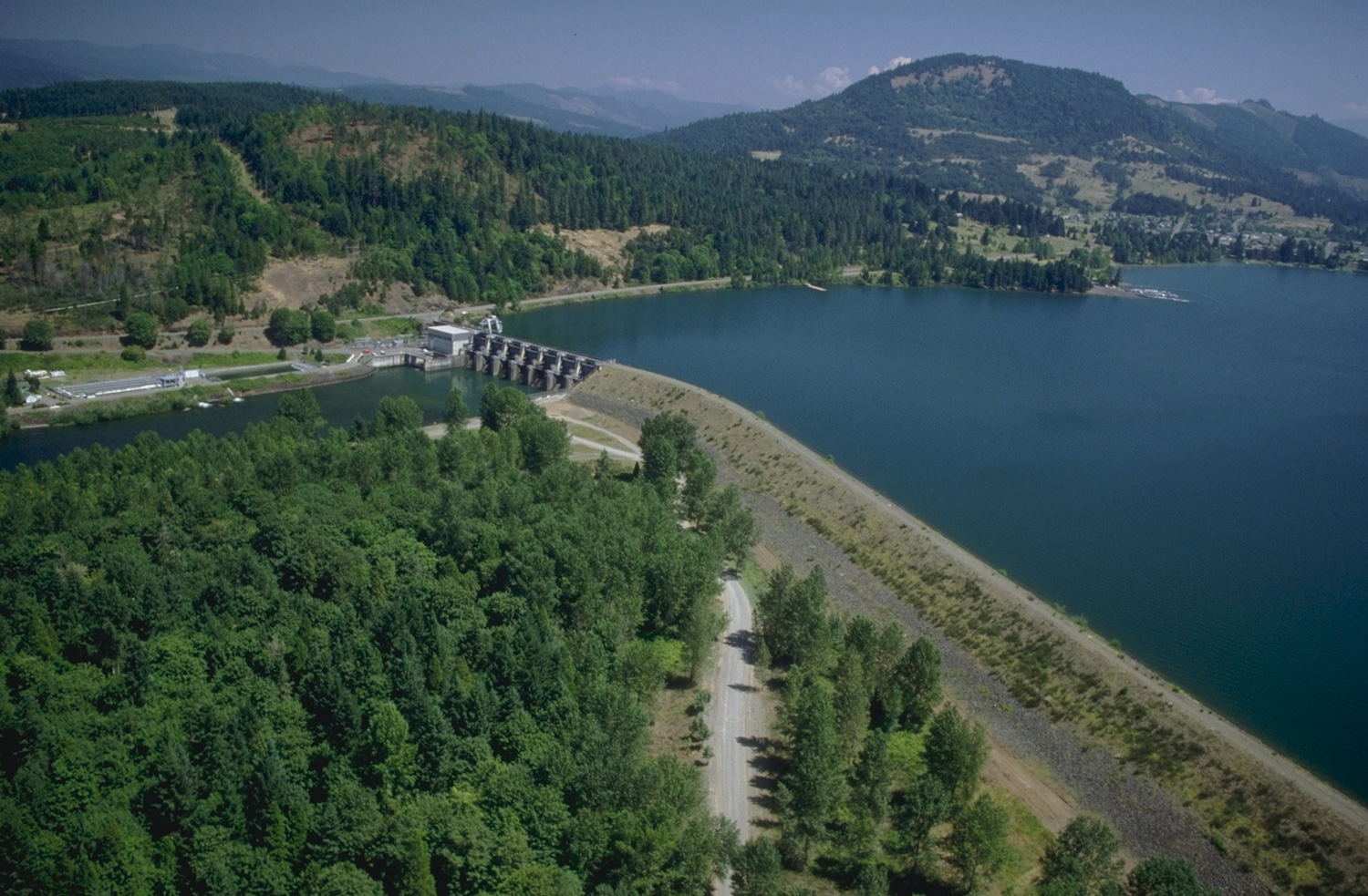
- Dexter Lake

- Location within Oregon Location within the United States
- Location: Lane County, Oregon
- Coordinates: 43°55′25″N 122°48′24″W
- Type: Reservoir, mesotrophic
- Primary inflows: Middle Fork Willamette River
- Primary outflows: Middle Fork Willamette River
- Catchment area: 1,002 square miles (2,600 km^{2})
- Basin countries: United States
- Surface area: 1,025 acres (415 ha)
- Average depth: 27 feet (8.2 m)
- Max. depth: 56 feet (17 m)
- Water volume: 29,990 acre-feet (36,990,000 m^{3})
- Residence time: less than one month
- Shore length^{1}: 7 miles (11 km)
- Surface elevation: 695 feet (212 m)
- Settlements: Dexter, Lowell
- ^{1} Shore length is not a well-defined measure.

Dexter Reservoir (also known as Dexter Lake) is a reservoir in Lane County, in the U.S. state of Oregon. It is about 16 miles (26 km) southeast of Eugene on the Middle Fork Willamette River, immediately downriver from Lookout Point Lake, another reservoir. The communities of Dexter and Lowell are near the lake. Oregon Route 58 follows the lake's southern shore, while Pengra Road parallels the lake's northern shore as far east as Lowell.

Dexter Dam, 117 feet (36 m) high, impounds up to 29,900 acre-feet (36,900,000 m^{3}) of water in the reservoir. The powerhouse at the dam can generate 15,000 kilowatts of electricity. The lake and three adjacent state parks are used for water sports and other outdoor recreation.

== History ==
The two reservoirs, Dexter and Lookout Point, were created in 1954 when the United States Army Corps of Engineers finished building the dams that contain them. Dexter exists partly to control water surges from the upstream lake during Lookout Point's production of hydroelectricity. Lookout reservoir water levels vary greatly, while the flow below Dexter Dam remains relatively steady. The Dexter and Lookout Point projects are among 13 that the Corps built in the Willamette Valley.

== Recreation ==
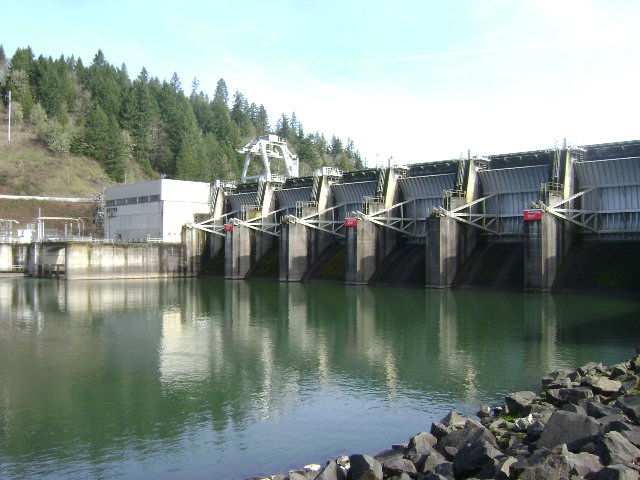
Dexter Dam

In addition to mitigating floods and generating electricity, Dexter Reservoir is used for recreation. Three state parks are located near the lake. Dexter State Recreation Site is a 100-acre (40 ha) park with picnic tables, toilets, and a boat launch adjacent to Dexter Dam, about 16 miles (26 km) southeast of Eugene. Activities at or near the park include swimming, fishing, sailing, and other water sports. The University of Oregon Rowing Team has practiced continuously on the reservoir since 1967.

Elijah Bristow State Park is an 847-acre (343 ha) park that stretches for 3 miles (4.8 km) along the south bank of the river below Dexter Dam. Park amenities include picnic tables, restrooms, equestrian staging areas, horseshoe pits, a wildlife viewing platform, and a boat launch. The park has 12 miles (19 km) of trails through woods and meadows. Most of the trails are open to mountain bikers and equestrians as well as hikers. Lowell State Recreation Site is a waterfront park on the north side of Dexter Lake. Amenities include picnic tables, a boat launch, dock, playground, basketball court, and restrooms. Fishing, swimming, sailing, and waterskiing are among possible activities at this site.

Dexter Lake supports populations of rainbow trout, largemouth bass, and smallmouth bass. The lake also has large populations of northern pikeminnow. The City of Lowell encourages removal of this rough fish during a pikeminnow contest held each July.

== See also ==
- List of lakes in Oregon
- List of dams in the Columbia River watershed

== Works cited ==
- Bannan, Jan (2002). Oregon State Parks: A Complete Recreation Guide, 2nd ed. Seattle, Washington: The Mountaineers Books. ISBN 0-89886-794-0.
- Sheehan, Madelynne Diness (2005). Fishing in Oregon: The Complete Oregon Fishing Guide, 10th ed. Scappoose, Oregon: Flying Pencil Publications. ISBN 0-916473-15-5.
