= Tufti Mountain =

Mountain in Oregon, United States

- Location within Oregon Location within the United States

Highest point
- Elevation: 3,176 ft (968 m)
- Coordinates: 43°40′26″N 122°23′32″W

Geography
- Location: Willamette National Forest; Lane County, Oregon
- Parent range: Cascade Range
- Topo map: USGS Oakridge

Tufti Mountain is a summit in Lane County, Oregon, in the United States with an elevation of 3,176 feet (968 m).

Tufti was named in honor of a Native American (Indian) who lived near the site of Oakridge.
