= Calapooya Mountains =

Mountain range in Oregon, United States

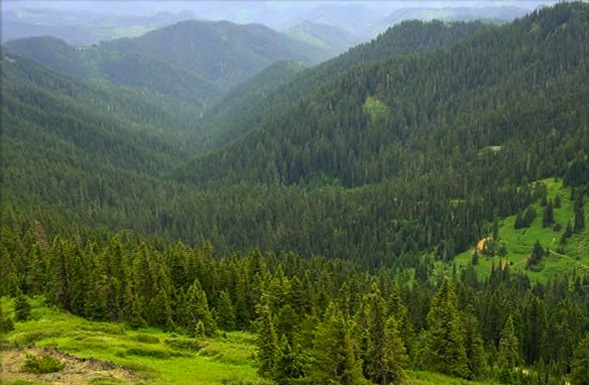
- View from Fairview Peak Lookout

Highest point
- Peak: Balm Mountain
- Elevation: 6,165 ft (1,879 m)
- Coordinates: 43°22′49″N 122°25′19″W

Dimensions
- Length: 60 mi (97 km) east–west

Naming
- Etymology: The Kalapuya Native Americans of the Willamette Valley

Geography
- Country: United States
- State: Oregon
- Counties: Lane and Douglas
- Range coordinates: 43°29′59″N 122°30′04″W
- Borders on: Cascade Range; Oregon Coast Range

The Calapooya Mountains are a mountain range in Lane and Douglas counties of southwestern Oregon in the United States. The range runs for approximately 60 miles (97 km) west from the Cascade Range between Eugene on the north and Roseburg on the south.

== Geology ==
The Calapooya Mountains are composed of volcanic rocks and newer sedimentary strata. The mountains have been deeply eroded by the Coast Fork Willamette River and its tributaries. In the southern drainage, the tributaries of the North Umpqua River have cut into the southern slopes. The soil is silty, clay loam formed from sandstone, sediment, and igneous rocks.

== Topography ==
The Calapooya Mountains and the Calapooya Divide are two parts of a spur of the Western Cascade mountains in the U.S. state of Oregon that form the divide between the watersheds of the Willamette and Umpqua rivers. At its southeastern end, the spur joins the Cascade Range near Cowhorn Mountain near the headwaters of the Middle Fork Willamette River and the North Umpqua River. A topographic map in the Atlas of Oregon shows the Calapooya Mountains curving northwest from near Potter, McGowan, and Balm mountains past Bohemia Mountain to Holland Point, south of Oakridge. From near Bohemia Mountain, a block of mountains connected to the Calapooya Mountains runs due west along the border between Lane and Douglas counties to the vicinity of Interstate 5 (I-5) near Rice Hill. This block is known as the Calapooya Divide. To the north along I-5 are Cottage Grove and Eugene and to the south are Sutherlin and Roseburg.

Streams flowing south from the Calapooyas into the North Umpqua River include Steamboat, Canton, and Rock creeks, while Calapooya Creek flows west from the divide into the Umpqua main stem. Streams flowing north or east into the Middle Fork Willamette River include Tumblebug, Staley, Coal, and Packard creeks. Flowing northwest or west into the Coast Fork Willamette River or its major tributary, the Row River, are Brice, Layng, and Mosby creeks and Big River. The Umpqua flows west through the Oregon Coast Range to the Pacific Ocean at Reedsport, while the Willamette flows north to the Columbia River, which flows northwest to the Pacific Ocean at Astoria.

The highest peaks in the range include Balm Mountain at 6,165 feet (1,879 m) above sea level, Potter Mountain at 6,145 feet (1,873 m), and McGowan Mountain at 6,130 feet (1,870 m), all near the southeastern end of the range. Along the divide, Huckleberry Mountain in the east rises to 4,754 feet (1,449 m), while Ben More Mountain near I-5 is only 2,480 feet (760 m) high. Bohemia Mountain and its close neighbor Fairview Peak reach identical peak elevations of 5,933 feet (1,808 m), while Holland Point near Oakridge is 5,048 feet (1,539 m) high.

== Climate ==
The climate in the Calapooya Mountains follows a pattern of wet winters and dry summers. Precipitation generally increases with elevation, ranging from an average of 40 to 50 inches (1,000 to 1,300 mm) per year in the valleys to 70 to 80 inches (1,800 to 2,000 mm) on the mountain peaks. Above 4,000 feet (1,200 m), a significant part of this falls as snow.

== History ==
Throughout the history of the region, the range has provided a geographic and cultural barrier between the Willamette Valley and the Umpqua Valley, effectively separating Western Oregon from Southern Oregon. In the 19th century, it separated the tribal domains of the Kalapuya and Umpqua tribes of Native Americans. During the 1840s, the mountains proved a barrier to white settlers seeking to move into southern Oregon or to move southward to the California gold fields. The Applegate Trail, blazed in the late 1840s, provided the first reliable path for white settlement through the western end of the mountains. Interstate 5 essentially follows the route of the trail between Eugene and Roseburg.

The mountains have been an important timber source in the 20th century. The eastern end of the mountains are largely within the Umpqua National Forest in the south and Willamette National Forest in the north.

== Works cited ==
- Loy, William G., et al. (2001). Atlas of Oregon. Eugene, Oregon: University of Oregon Press. ISBN 0-87114-102-7.
