= Coast Fork Willamette River =

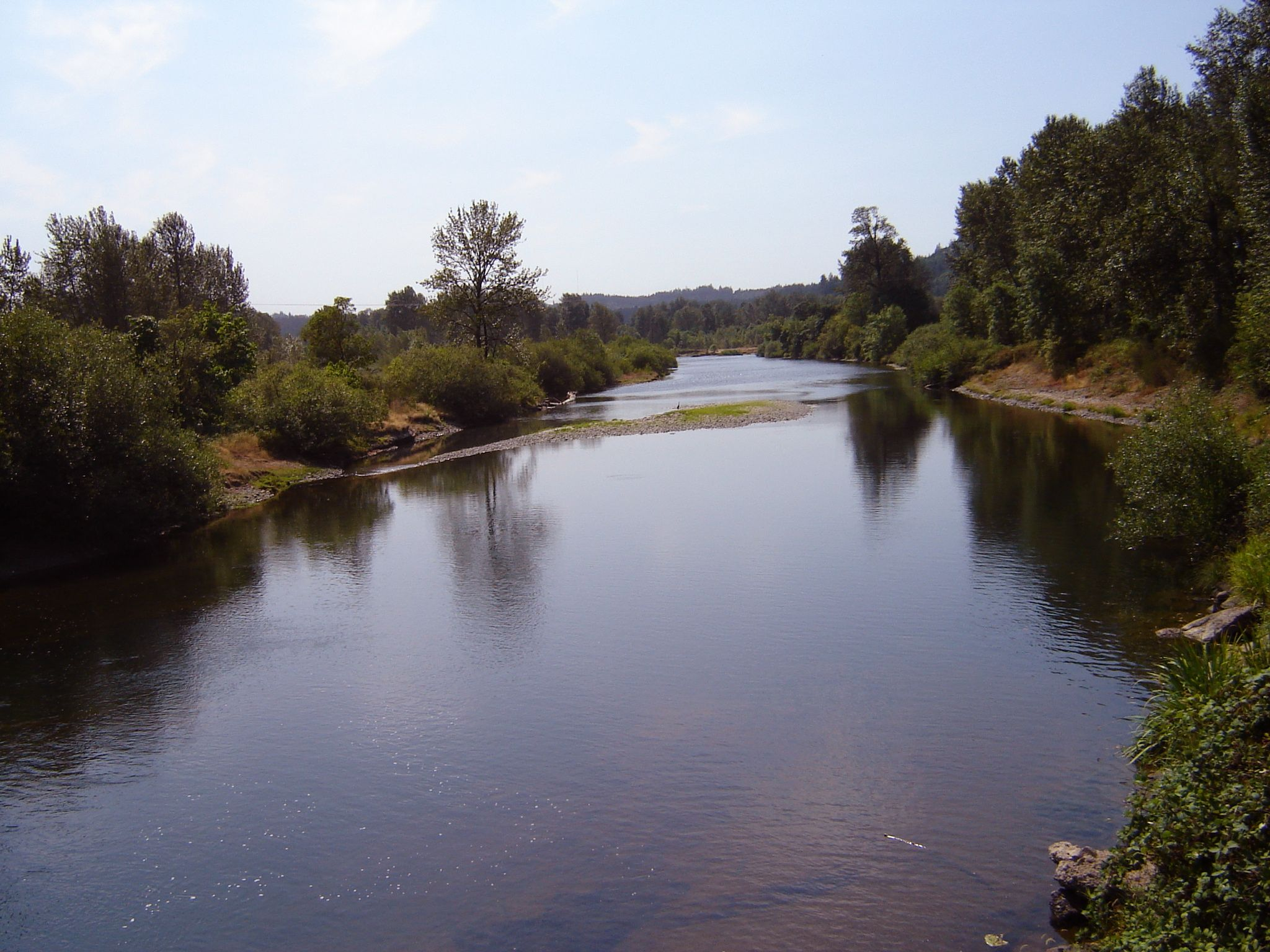
- The Coast Fork Willamette River

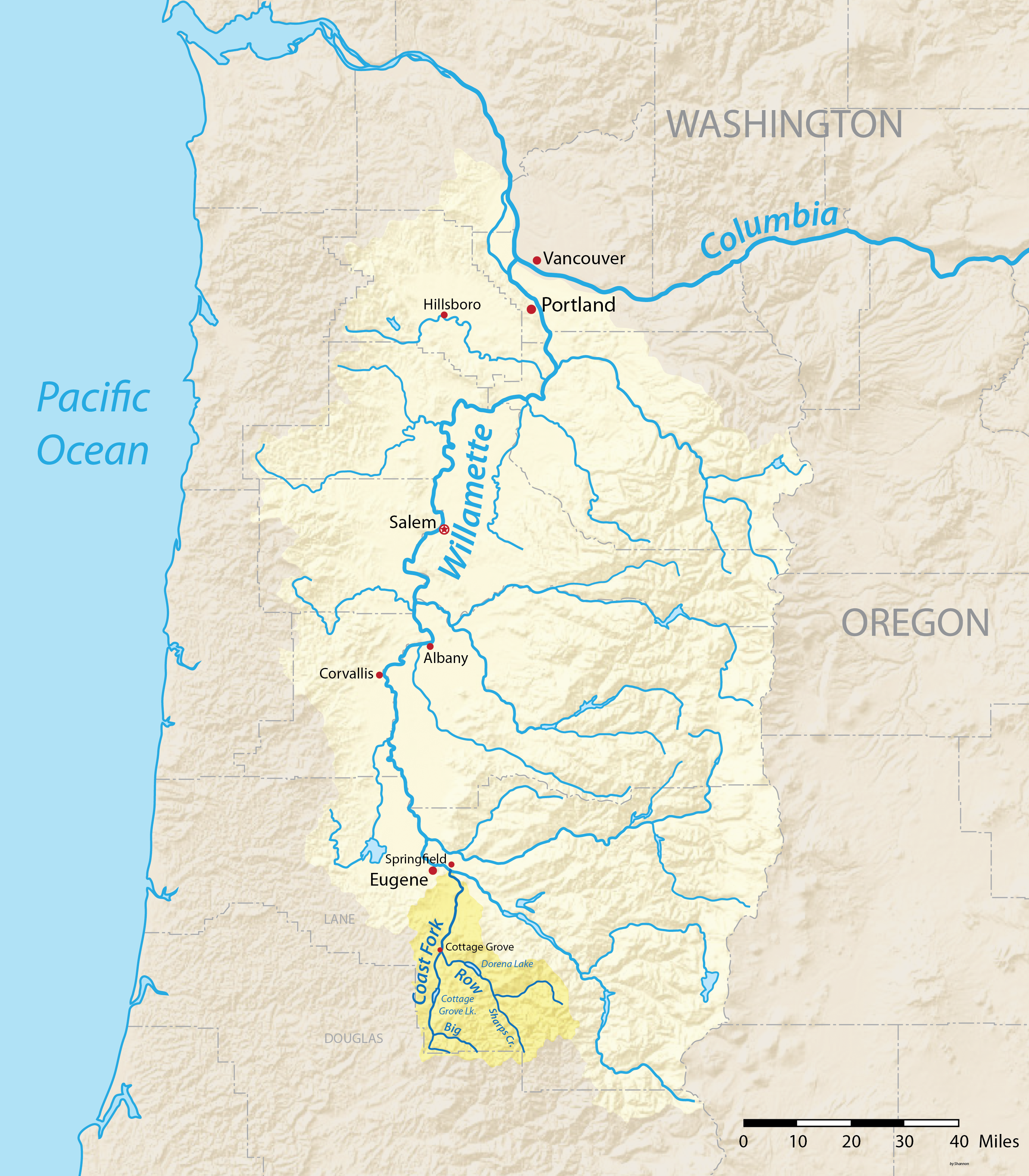
- Map of the Willamette River basin with the Coast Fork highlighted

- Location of the mouth of the Coast Fork Willamette River in Oregon
- Etymology: Willamette is from a similar Clackamas Indian village name

Location
- Country: United States
- State: Oregon
- County: Lane

Physical characteristics
- Source: Confluence of Big River and Garoutte Creek
  - location: Calapooya Mountains, Oregon
  - coordinates: 43°35′44″N 123°4′4″W
  - elevation: 990 ft (300 m)
- Mouth: Willamette River
  - location: near Eugene and Springfield, Oregon
  - coordinates: 44°1′23″N 123°1′25″W
  - elevation: 436 ft (133 m)
- Length: 40 mi (64 km)
- Basin size: 666 sq mi (1,720 km^{2})
- Discharge
  - location: Goshen, 6.4 miles (10.3 km) from the mouth
  - average: 1,558 cu ft/s (44.1 m^{3}/s)
  - minimum: 36 cu ft/s (1.0 m^{3}/s)
  - maximum: 58,500 cu ft/s (1,660 m^{3}/s)

Basin features
- Tributaries
  - right: Row River

The Coast Fork Willamette River is one of two forks that unite to form the Willamette River in western Oregon in the United States. It is about 40 miles (64 km) long, draining an area of the mountains at the south end of the Willamette Valley south of Eugene.

== Course ==
The Coast Fork Willamette River is formed in southwestern Lane County, in the Calapooya Mountains, by the confluence of the Little River and the Big River. The Coast Fork flows north through the mountains, through the Cottage Grove Lake reservoir, to Cottage Grove, where it receives the Row River from the southeast. It continues north past Creswell and joins the Middle Fork from the south, about 2 miles (3 km) southeast of Eugene, to form the Willamette.

== See also ==
- List of rivers of Oregon
- Willamette Riverkeeper
