= Middle Fork Willamette River =

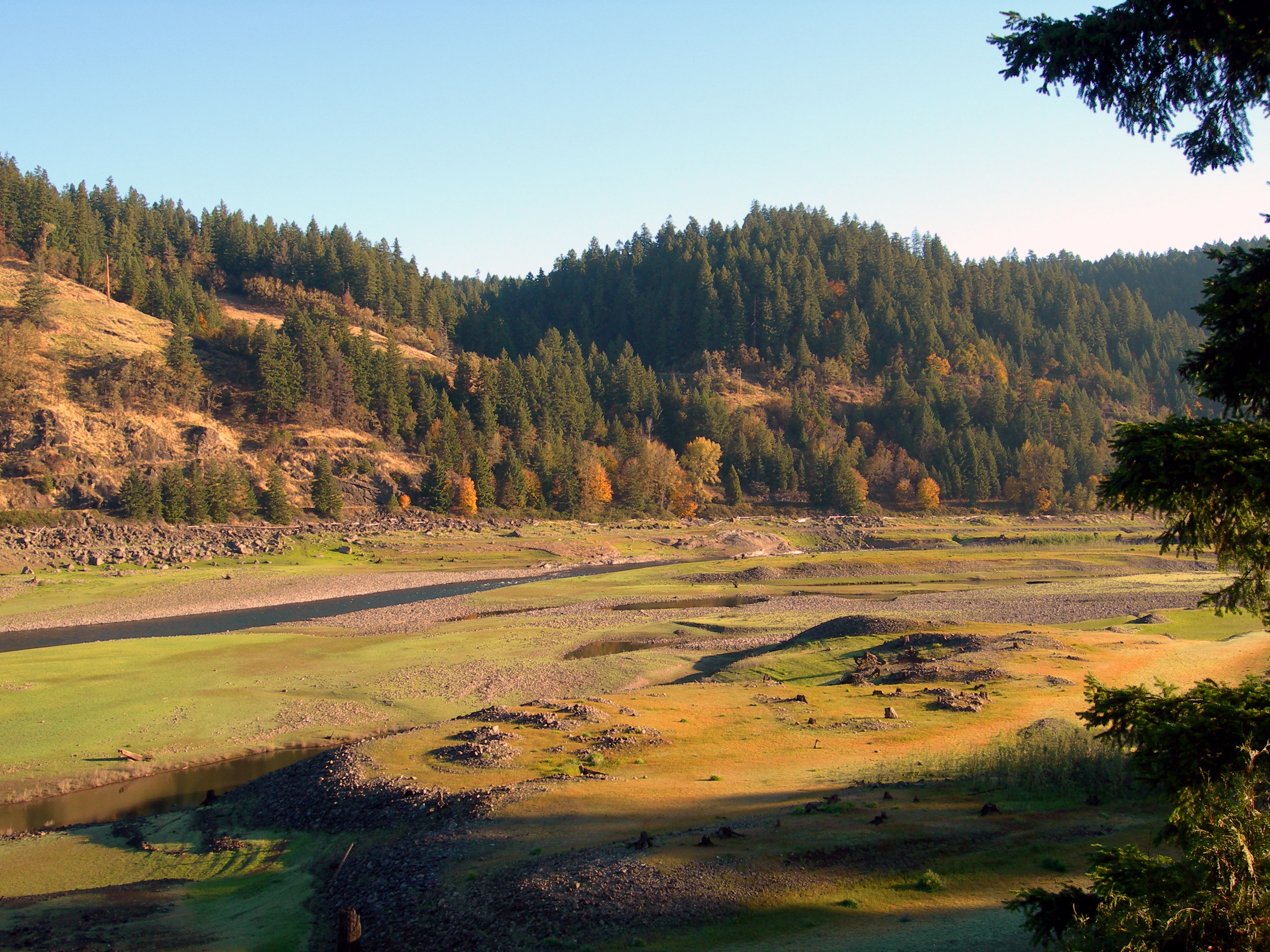

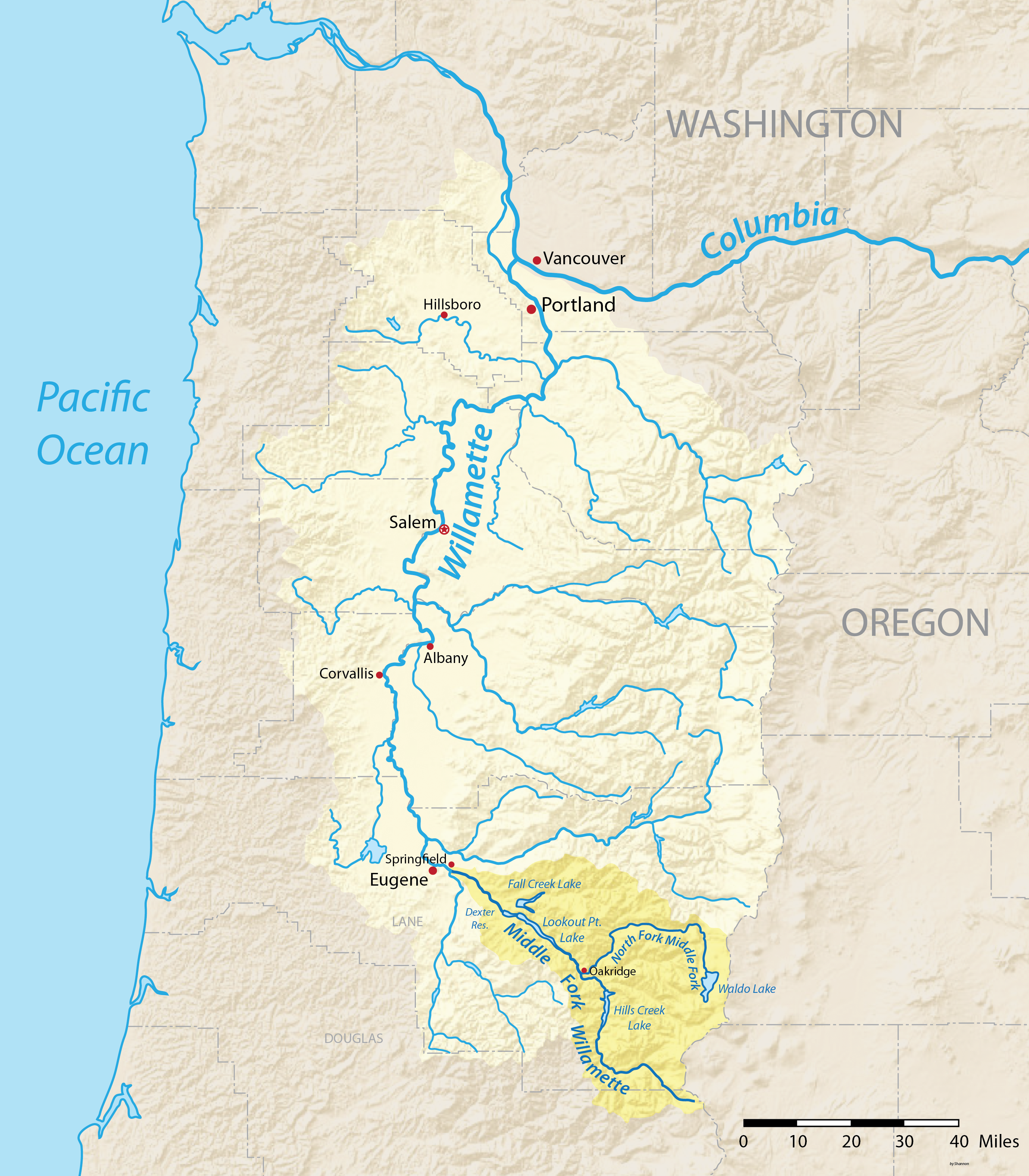
- Map of the Willamette River watershed with the Middle Fork highlighted

- Location of the mouth of the Middle Fork Willamette River in Oregon

Location
- Country: United States
- State: Oregon
- Counties: Douglas and Lane

Physical characteristics
- Source: Timpanogas Lake, Cascade Range
  - coordinates: 43°24′48″N 122°07′20″W
  - elevation: 5,552 ft (1,692 m)
- Mouth: Willamette River
  - location: between Eugene and Springfield
  - coordinates: 44°01′23″N 123°01′25″W
  - elevation: 440 ft (130 m)
- Length: 115 mi (185 km)
- Basin size: 1,340 sq mi (3,500 km^{2})
- Discharge
  - location: Jasper
  - average: 4,087 cu ft/s (115.7 m^{3}/s)
  - minimum: 366 cu ft/s (10.4 m^{3}/s)
  - maximum: 94,000 cu ft/s (2,700 m^{3}/s)

Basin features
- Tributaries
  - right: Salt Creek, North Fork Middle Fork Willamette River

The Middle Fork Willamette River is one of several forks that unite to form the Willamette River in the western part of the U.S. state of Oregon. It is approximately 115 miles (185 km) long, draining an area of the Cascade Range southeast of Eugene, which is at the southern end of the Willamette Valley.

== Course ==
The Middle Fork Willamette River is formed in northeastern Douglas County by the joining of several small headwater streams near Emigrant Pass. The river flows generally north into Lane County, through the Calapooya Mountains, to the vicinity of Eugene and Springfield, where it joins the Coast Fork Willamette River to form the Willamette River proper.

Just south (upriver) of Oakridge, the Middle Fork is impounded in Hills Creek Reservoir, created by Hills Creek Dam. Below the dam, the river receives Salt Creek and then Salmon Creek at Oakridge. At Westfir, the Middle Fork is joined by the North Fork Middle Fork Willamette River from the right bank. Below this confluence, the Middle Fork is impounded by two more reservoirs, Lookout Point Reservoir and Dexter Reservoir. Fall Creek enters from the right below Dexter before the Middle Fork joins the Coast Fork in Springfield to form the main stem Willamette River.

=== Tributaries ===
Named tributaries from source to mouth are Beaver, Tumblebug, Royal, Fizz, Indigo, Found, Skunk, Swift, Mac, and Echo creeks. Then come Staley, Maple, Simpson, Gravel, Deadhorse, Jims, Coal, Youngs, and What Creek. Further downstream are Indian, Dry, Spring Butte, Boulder, Butcherknife, Snake, Fy, Emile, Estep, and Bohemia creeks.

Bills, Cone, Buck, Gold, and Windfall creeks are next, followed by a series of streams that enter the river via Hills Creek Reservoir. They are Snow, Coffeepot, Big Willow, Little Willow, Stony, Bull, Packard, Modoc, Larlson, and Hills creeks.

Downstream of Hills Lake Reservoir come Salt, Salmon, Shortridge, Gray, Spot, and Chillo creeks, followed by the North Fork Willamette River. Then come Deception, Dell, Buckhead, Bridge, Tire, Whitehead, Rock, and Hospital creeks.

Entering the Middle Fork via Lookout Point Reservoir are Duval, Carpet Hill, Schweitzer, South, North, Armet, Harper, Cain, School, Rhodes, Crale, Goodman, Fern, Bannister, Hazel, Rolling Riffle, and Minnow creeks. Noisy Creek enters the river via Dexter Reservoir. Below the reservoir come Lost Creek, then Fall Creek, Alder, Rattlesnake, Hills, Wallace, and Pudding creeks before the Middle Fork meets the Coast Fork to form the Willamette.

== See also ==
- List of rivers of Oregon
- List of longest streams of Oregon
- Tributaries of the Columbia River
