= Oregon Route 222 =

State highway in Lane County, Oregon, US

Oregon Route 222
- Springfield–Creswell Highway No. 222
- Route 222 highlighted in red

Route information
- Maintained by ODOT
- Length: 11.16 mi (17.96 km)
- Existed: 2002–present

Southwestern section
- West end: OR 99 in Creswell
- East end: 0.1 miles north of Rodgers Road near Creswell (South Section)

Northeastern section
- South end: OR 58 near Pleasant Hill
- North end: OR 126 Bus. in Springfield

Location
- Country: United States
- State: Oregon
- County: Lane

Highway system
- Oregon Highways; Interstate; US; State; Named; Scenic
← OR 221	→ OR 223

Oregon Route 222 (OR 222) is an Oregon state highway, consisting of two disconnected sections in Lane County. |county=Lane The north section runs from OR 126 Business in Springfield to OR 58 near Pleasant Hill. Incorporating a temporary location for part of its route, the north section is 8.00 miles (12.87 km) long and runs northwest to southeast.

The south section runs from a point on Cloverdale Road 0.1 miles north of Rodgers Road near Cloverdale, along Cloverdale Road, to OR 99 in Creswell. It is 3.16 miles (5.09 km) long and runs generally east–west.

OR 222 is known as the Springfield-Creswell Highway No. 222 (see Oregon highways and routes). OR 222 was established in 2002 as part of Oregon's project to assign route numbers to highways that previously were not assigned.

== Route description ==
The north section of OR 222 begins at an intersection with OR 126 Business at Springfield and heads south via South 42nd Street, then east, then south via Jasper Road, through Jasper, Over the Middle Fork of the Willamette via Parkway Road then south Ending in Pleasant Hill, OR 222 intersects with OR 58, where the north section ends.

The Bypass of the South 49th Avenue approach to Jasper Road is the Bob Straub Parkway beginning at the intersection of OR 126 and OR 126 Business (Main Street) south to Jasper Road. Phase one of the Bob Straub Parkway was a 0.5 mi (0.80 km) segment from Main Street to South 57th Street. Phase two of the parkway was a 2 mi (3.2 km) segment from South 57th Street to Jasper Road.

The south section of OR 222 begins on Cloverdale Road approximately 0.1 miles north of Rodgers Road. It heads south and then west to Creswell, where it ends at an intersection with OR 99.

== History ==
OR 222 was assigned to the Springfield-Creswell Highway in 2002.

== Major intersections ==
The entire route is in Lane County.

Location	mi	km	Destinations	Notes
Creswell	14.88	23.95	OR 99 (Mill Street, Oregon Avenue)	
Creswell	14.60	23.50	I-5 – Roseburg, Eugene	I-5 exit 182.
Cloverdale	11.63	18.72	Cloverdale Road	
Gap in route
	8.00	12.87	OR 58 – Dexter, Oakridge, Goshen, Eugene	
Springfield	0.00	0.00	OR 126 Bus. (Main Street) – Springfield City Center, McKenzie River	
1.000 mi = 1.609 km; 1.000 km = 0.621 mi
