= Willamette Pass Resort =

Ski area in Oregon, United States

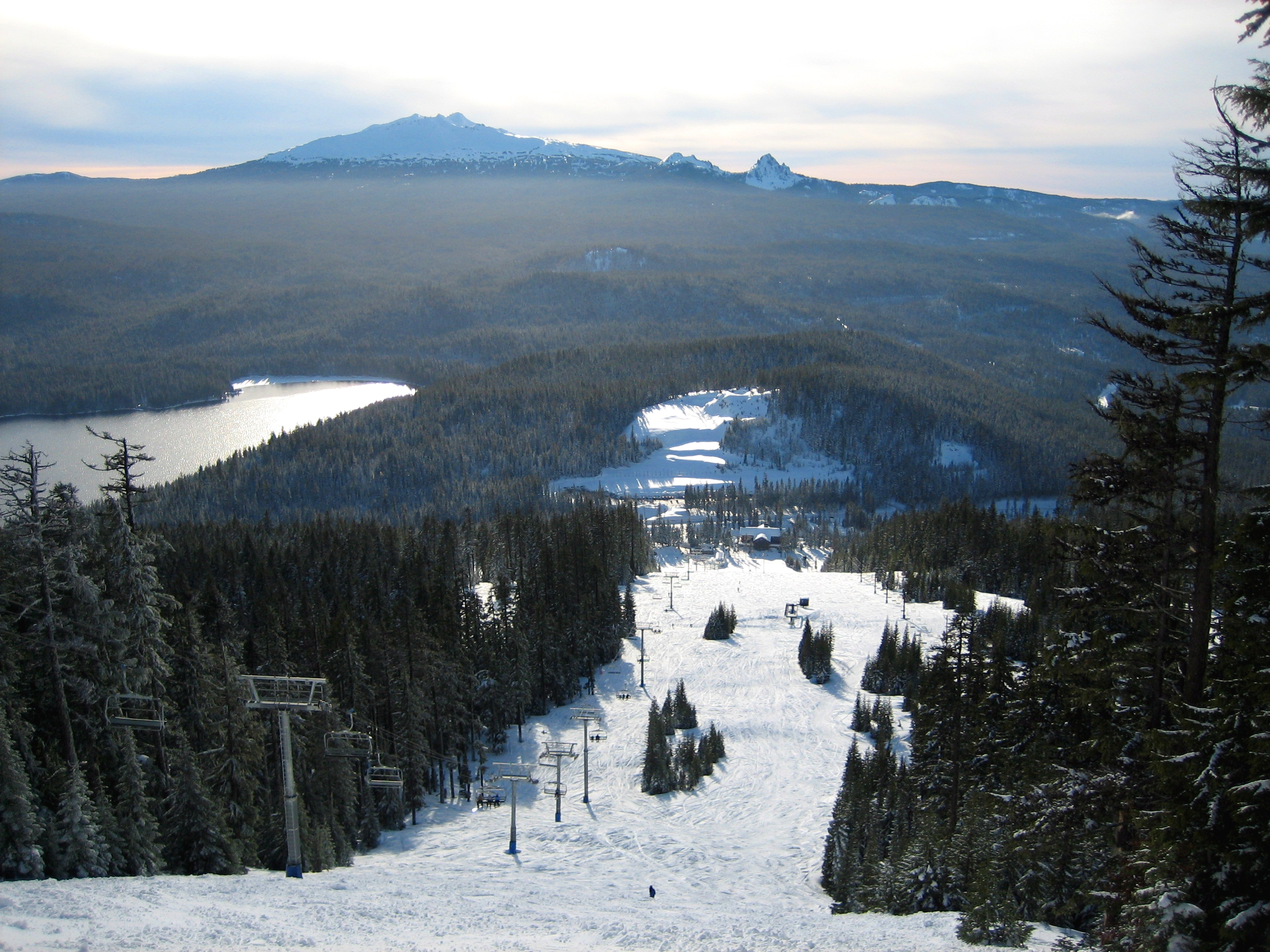
- View from summit of Willamette Pass Ski Area

- Location of Willamette Pass in Oregon Willamette Pass Resort (the United States)
- Location: Cascade Range, Klamath County, Oregon; United States
- Nearest city: Oakridge 20 miles (30 km)
- Coordinates: 43.60°N 122.036°W
- Status: Operating
- Vertical: 1,563 ft (476 m)
- Top elevation: 6,683 ft (2,037 m)
- Base elevation: 5,120 ft (1,561 m)
- Skiable area: 555 acres (2.25 km^{2})
- Trails: 29 total: 20% Beginner; 45% Intermediate; 35% Advanced / Expert
- Longest run: 2.1 m (6 ft 11 in)
- Lift system: 5 Total - Winter: 1 High-Speed Six Pack; 3 Triple Chair; 1 Magic Carpet
- Terrain parks: 1
- Snowfall: 430 in (10.9 m) per year
- Website: willamettepass.ski

Willamette Pass Resort is a ski area in the western United States, located at Willamette Pass in west central Oregon, in Klamath and Lane counties. In the Cascade Range between Oakridge and La Pine and accessed by Highway 58, it operates on federal land under special use permit on the Willamette and Deschutes National Forests. Founded in 1941, the ski area has been locally-owned and operated by the Wiper family of Eugene since 1982, the year its first chairlift was installed.

== Ski area information ==
Willamette Pass is best known for having one of the steepest runs in the world, "RTS", which at its steepest point is 52 degrees. It hosted the 1993 Subaru U.S. Speed Skiing Championships, where a top speed of 111.56 mph (179.54 km/h) was achieved.

The area is a popular place for nearby schools to visit, with lessons and plenty of green runs. The lodge has a restaurant, shop, lost-and-found service, and ski and snowboard rentals.

Snowshoeing and Nordic skiing activities are also available.

Willamette Pass resort entered into a new joint venture with Mountain Capital Partners

== Resort statistics ==
=== Elevation ===
- Summit: 6,683 ft (2,037 m)
- Base: 5,120 ft (1,561 m)
- Vertical: 1,563 ft (476 m)

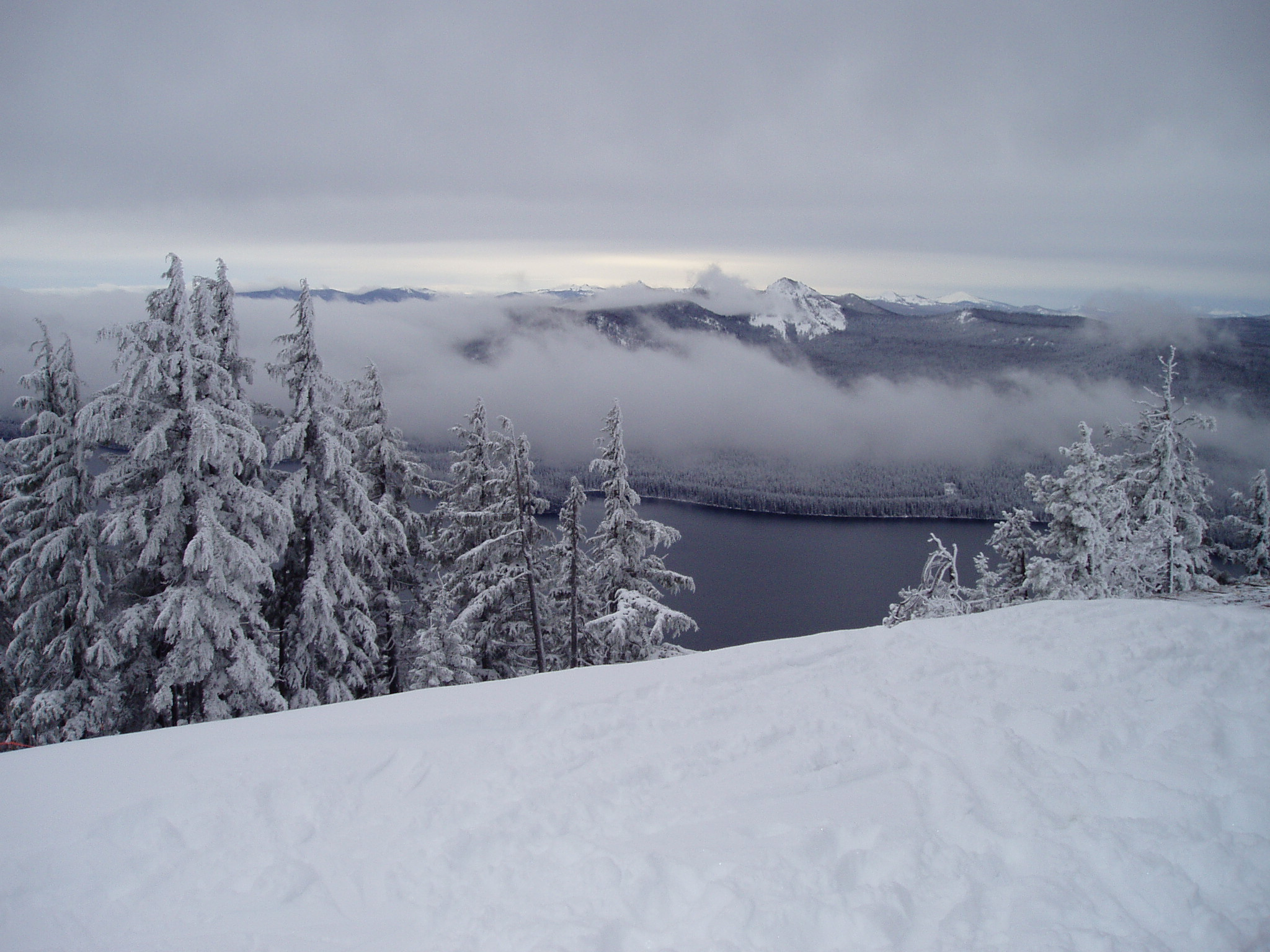
View of Odell Lake from the summit of Willamette Pass

=== Trails ===
- Skiable area: 555 acres (2.25 km^{2})
- Groomable area: 225 acres (0.91 km^{2})
- Trails: 29 total
  - 20% Beginner
  - 45% Intermediate
  - 35% Advanced / Expert
- Nordic trails: up to 12.4 miles (20 km) groomed
- Longest run: "Kaleidoscope/Perseverance" - 2.1 mi (3 km)
- Steepest run: "RTS"- up to 52°
- Average annual snowfall: 430 inches (1,090 cm)
- Peaks: 2
  - Eagle Peak
  - Peak 2

=== Lifts ===
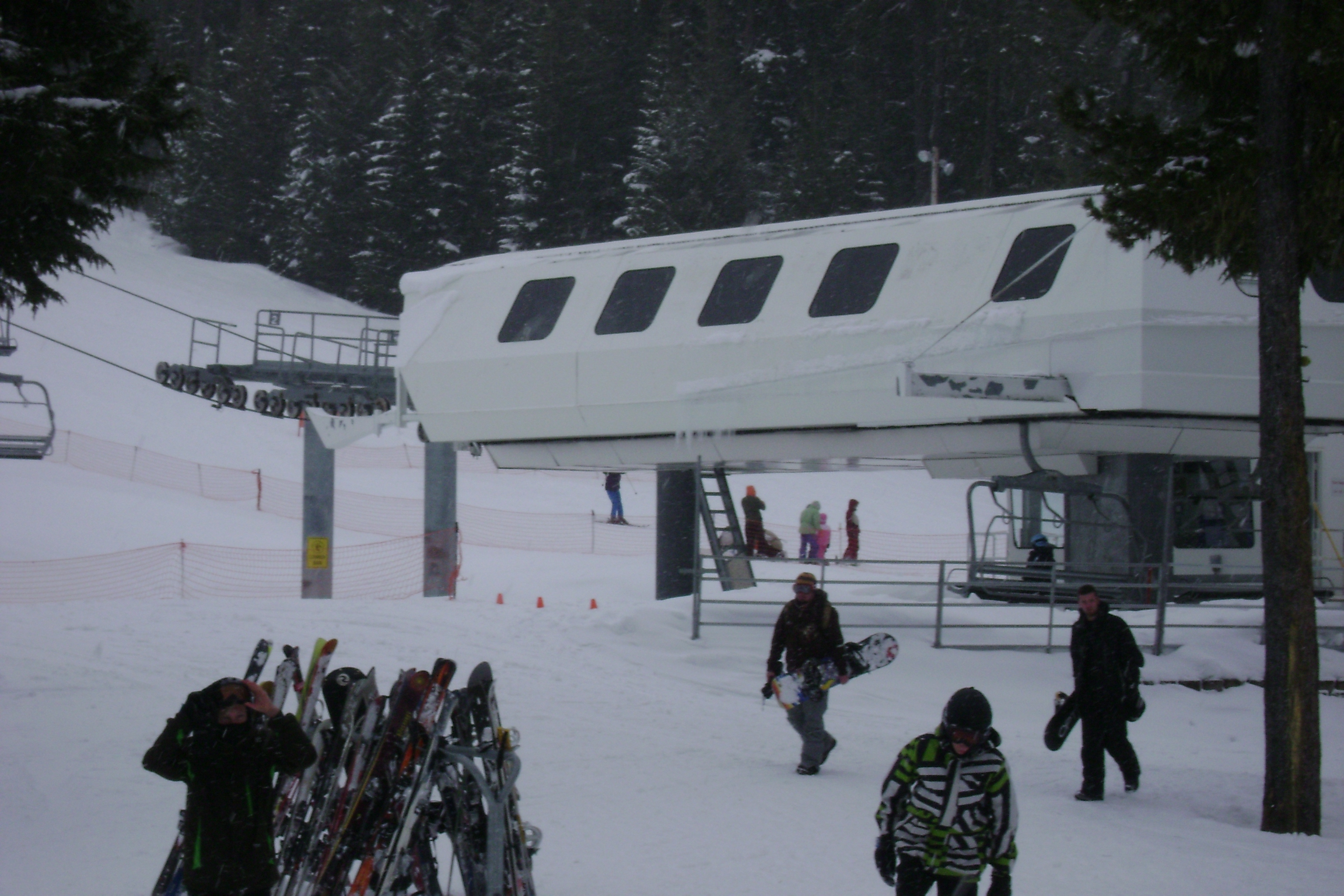
The only High Speed Six-Pack in Oregon.

- 6 Total
  - 1 High-Speed Six Pack Eagle Peak Accelerator (Doppelmayr CTEC)
  - 4 Triple Chairs Sleepy Hollow, Midway, Twilight Lift and Peak 2 Lift (Riblet Tramway Company)
  - 1 Magic Carpet
- Lift capacity: 12,300 skiers per hour

=== U.S. Ski Team ===
- Mike Lafferty - 1972 Olympian
