= Emigrant Pass (Oregon) =

Mountain pass in Oregon, United States

- Location within Oregon
- Elevation: 5,650 feet (1,720 m)

Third Approach
- Location: Klamath and Lane counties, United States
- Range: Cascade Range
- Coordinates: 43°28′00″N 122°08′21″W

Emigrant Pass is a gap in the Cascade Range in the U.S. state of Oregon. It is about 0.5 miles (0.8 km) west of Summit Lake on the border between Klamath and Lane counties. Originally called Willamette Pass, it lay along a primitive road that paralleled the Middle Fork Willamette River to near the crest. The gap's name was changed in 1960, when the mountain pass used by Oregon Route 58 north of Odell Lake was named Willamette Pass.

By the 1850s, Emigrant Pass, slightly south of Willamette Pass, was being used by emigrants to the Oregon Territory as a way over the Cascades. In October 1853, a party of 1,500 was almost stranded at the pass, but was saved from a Donner Party-style tragedy by nearby settlers who had begun to improve the route up the Middle Fork Willamette River earlier that year as a shortcut between the Oregon Trail near Boise, Idaho, and the Willamette Valley.
