= West Cascades Scenic Byway =

Scenic highway in Oregon, United States

West Cascades Scenic Byway National Forest Scenic Byway

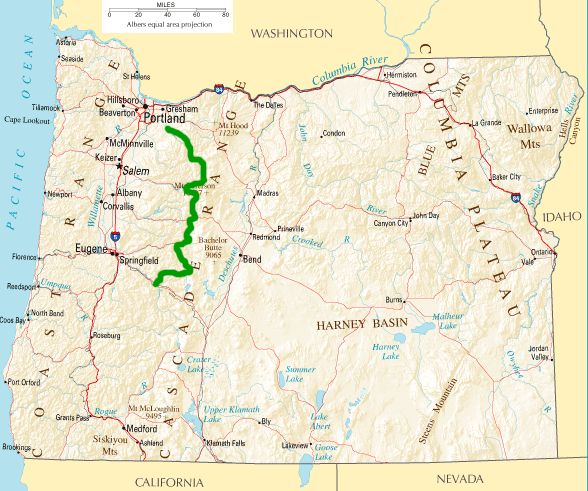
- West Cascades Scenic Byway shown in green

Route information
- Maintained by Oregon Department of Transportation
- Length: 220 mi (350 km)

Major junctions
- North end: OR 224 in Estacada, Oregon
- OR 22 in Detroit: OR 126 at Santiam Junction State Airport
- South end: OR 58 in Westfir

Location
- Country: United States
- State: Oregon
- Counties: Clackamas, Marion, Linn, & Lane

Highway system
- Scenic Byways; National; National Forest; BLM; NPS; Oregon Highways; Interstate; US; State; Named; Scenic

The West Cascades Scenic Byway is a 220-mile (350 km) National Scenic Byway in the U.S. state of Oregon. The route is designed to provide a tour on the west side of the Cascade Range along the east side of the Willamette Valley.

== Route description ==
The route is roughly north–south, from Estacada, southeast of Portland to Oakridge on the Willamette River southeast of Eugene. Much of the route is very sparsely populated, passing through timber regions in the Cascades.

From Estacada the route follows the valley of the Clackamas River upstream on Oregon Route 224 into the Mount Hood National Forest, then south along the Breitenbush River to Detroit on the North Santiam. It follows Oregon Route 22 along Detroit Lake to the junction of U.S. Route 20, then west a short distance on U.S. Route 20 to the junction of Oregon Route 126 at which the Aufderheide Scenic Bikeway begins for the last 60 miles of West Cascades. Following OR 126 south, it then cuts through the mountain south to Oakridge, where it ends (along with West Cascades) at an intersection with Oregon Route 58 in Westfir.

The route provides views of old growth fir trees and jagged volcanic peaks. The driving time is approximately 7–9 hours.
