= Cascade Summit, Oregon =

Unincorporated community in the state of Oregon, United States

Coordinates: 43°34′45″N 122°02′32″W

Cascade Summit is an unincorporated community in Klamath County, Oregon, United States. It is located on the west shore of Odell Lake near Shelter Cove; about 30 miles southeast of Oakridge.

Cascade Summit is a station of the Southern Pacific Railroad's (SP) Cascade Line established when the line was completed in 1925–1926. The station was named because it is just east of the summit tunnel through the Cascades. Cascade Summit post office was established in 1927 and closed in 1980. The railroad line is now owned by Union Pacific.

Cascade Summit is the highest point on the railroad's crossing of the Cascades at an elevation of 4,852 feet (1,479 m). It was a famous location for publicity photos in SP days. At Cascade Summit there was a station, siding, and a wye. During the 1930s to 1940s, passenger trains stopped at the station daily. Today only the siding remains. At one time the locale was the site of Cascade Summit Lodge; it later burned down, but as of 1990 the foundation was still visible.

== Climate ==
This region experiences warm (but not hot) and dry summers, with no average monthly temperatures above 71.6 °F. According to the Köppen Climate Classification system, Cascade Summit has a warm-summer Mediterranean climate, abbreviated "Csb" on climate maps.
