= North Fork Middle Fork Willamette River =

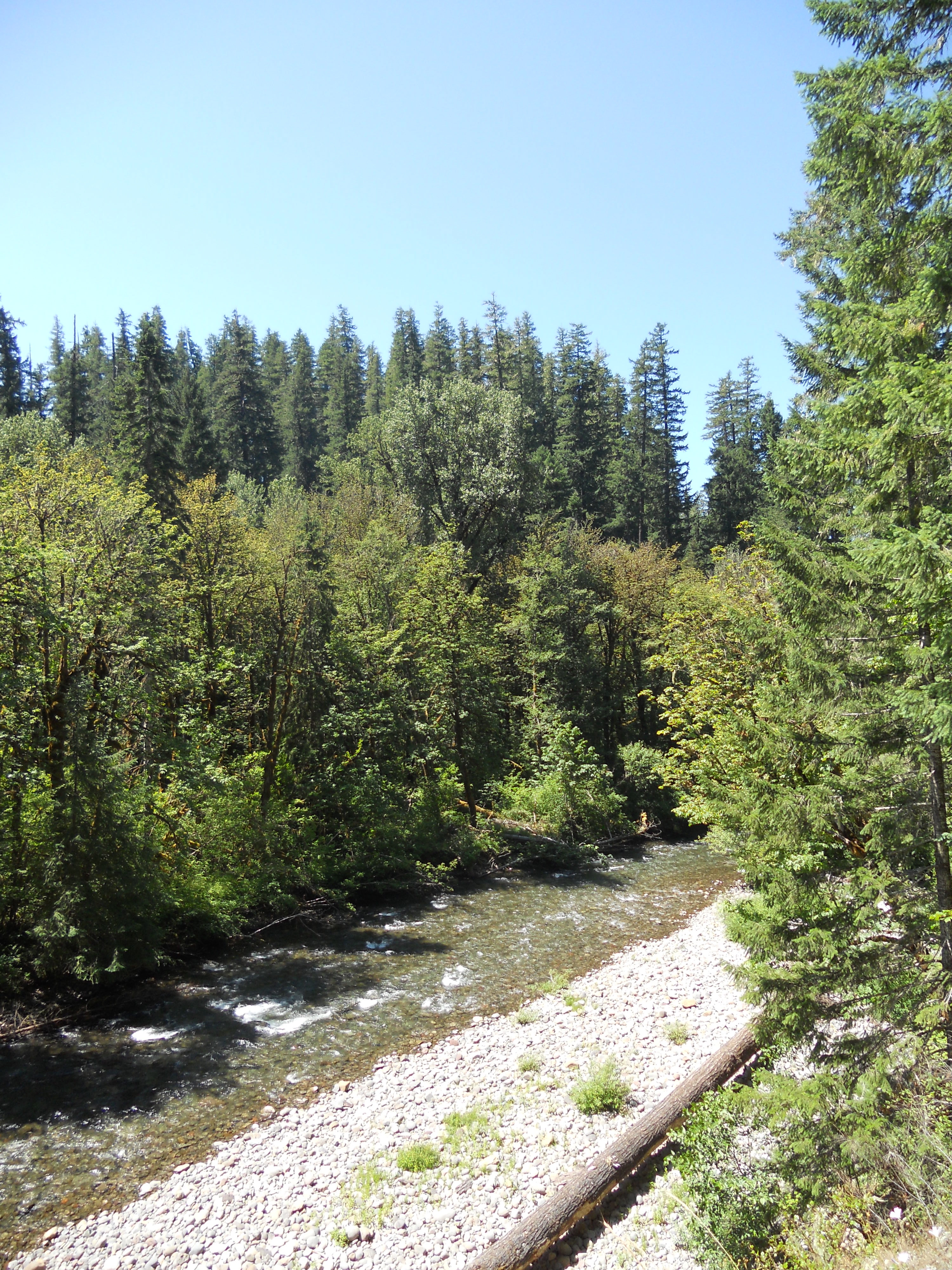

- Location of the mouth of the North Fork Middle Fork Willamette River in Oregon

Location
- Country: United States
- State: Oregon
- County: Lane

Physical characteristics
- Source: Waldo Lake
  - location: Cascade Range
  - coordinates: 43°46′1″N 122°3′11″W
- Mouth: Middle Fork Willamette River
  - coordinates: 43°45′30″N 122°31′27″W
  - elevation: 1,033 ft (315 m)

National Wild and Scenic River
- Type: Wild, Scenic, Recreational
- Designated: October 28, 1988

The North Fork Middle Fork Willamette River as it is officially named but frequently called North Fork of the Willamette River or North Fork of the Middle Fork of the Willamette River has its headwaters at Waldo Lake and flows into the Middle Fork Willamette River northwest of Oakridge. In the first 3 miles (5 km) below Waldo Lake, the river drops 2,400 feet (730 m) in 34 separate waterfalls through diverse natural plant life and old growth forest.

The river has Oregon's longest covered bridge crossing it at Westfir, the Office Bridge. Portions of the river were designated wild and scenic in 1988. The portion from Waldo Lake to 1 mile (1.6 km) upstream from Westfir is designated scenic by the State of Oregon and is known for its native trout by fly fishermen.

The river above Westfir is rated as class 3-4 (5) whitewater. Recommended flow range is 500 to 3,000 cubic feet per second (14 to 85 m^{3}/s).

== See also ==
- List of Oregon rivers
- List of National Wild and Scenic Rivers
