= Methodist Episcopal Church of Goshen =

Historic church in Oregon, United States

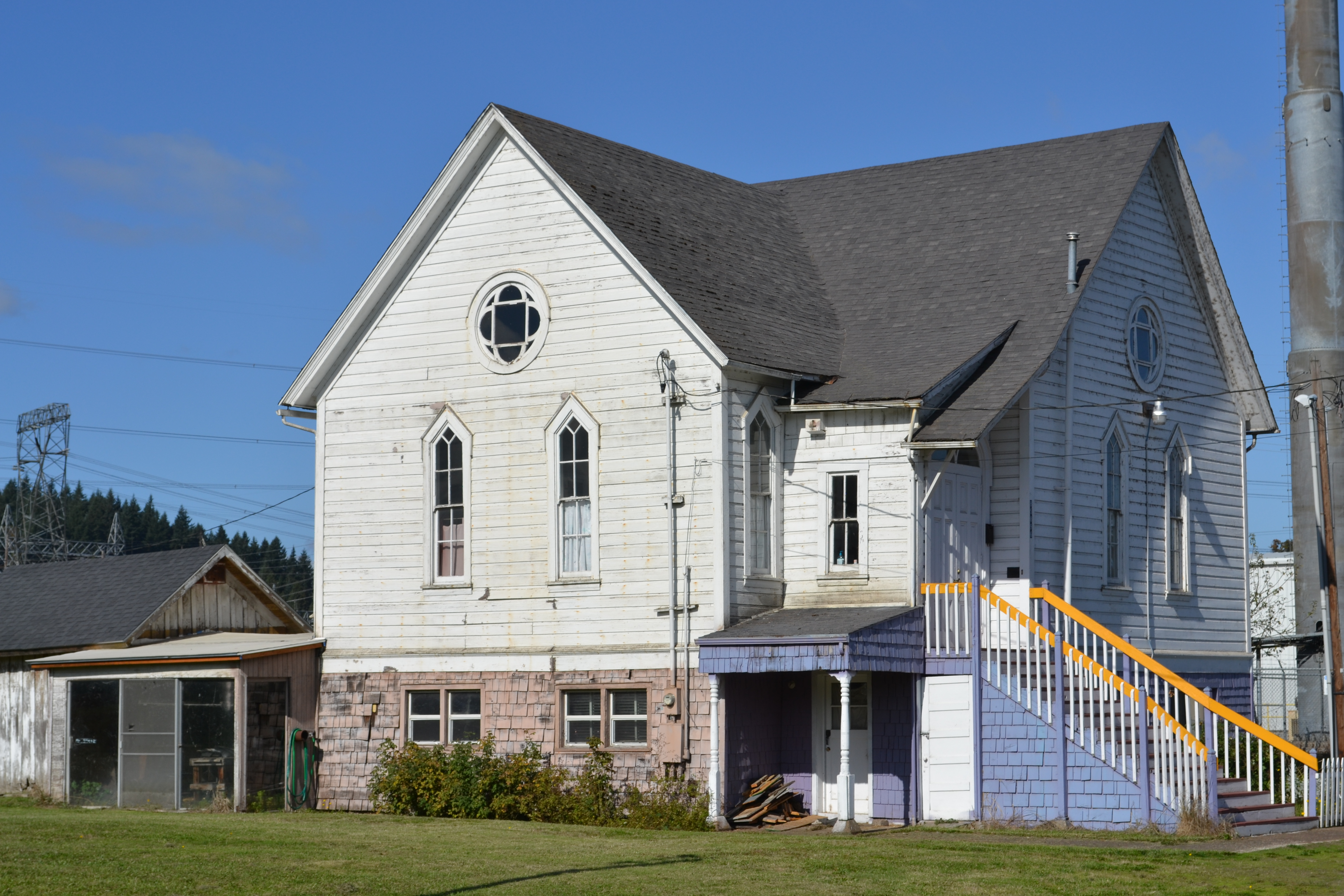
Methodist Episcopal Church (Goshen, Oregon)

The Methodist Episcopal Church of Goshen, located in Goshen, Oregon, is listed on the National Register of Historic Places.

== See also ==
- National Register of Historic Places listings in Lane County, Oregon
