= Heckletooth Mountain =

Mountain in Oregon, United States

- Location within Oregon Location within the United States

Highest point
- Elevation: 3,682 ft (1,122 m) NGVD 29
- Prominence: 242 ft (74 m)
- Coordinates: 43°44′27″N 122°22′07″W

Geography
- Location: Lane County, Oregon
- Parent range: Cascade Range
- Topo map: USGS McCredie Springs

Heckletooth Mountain is a summit in Lane County, Oregon, in the United States with an elevation of 3,682 feet (1,122 m) NGVD 29. It is located just north of the Willamette Highway (OR 58), in the Willamette National Forest.

Heckletooth Mountain was so named in the 1870s by a pioneer settler who likened the rocks about its jagged peak to the teeth of a hackle, a tool used to process flax.
