= Goshen, Oregon =

Unincorporated community in the state of Oregon, United States

- Unincorporated community
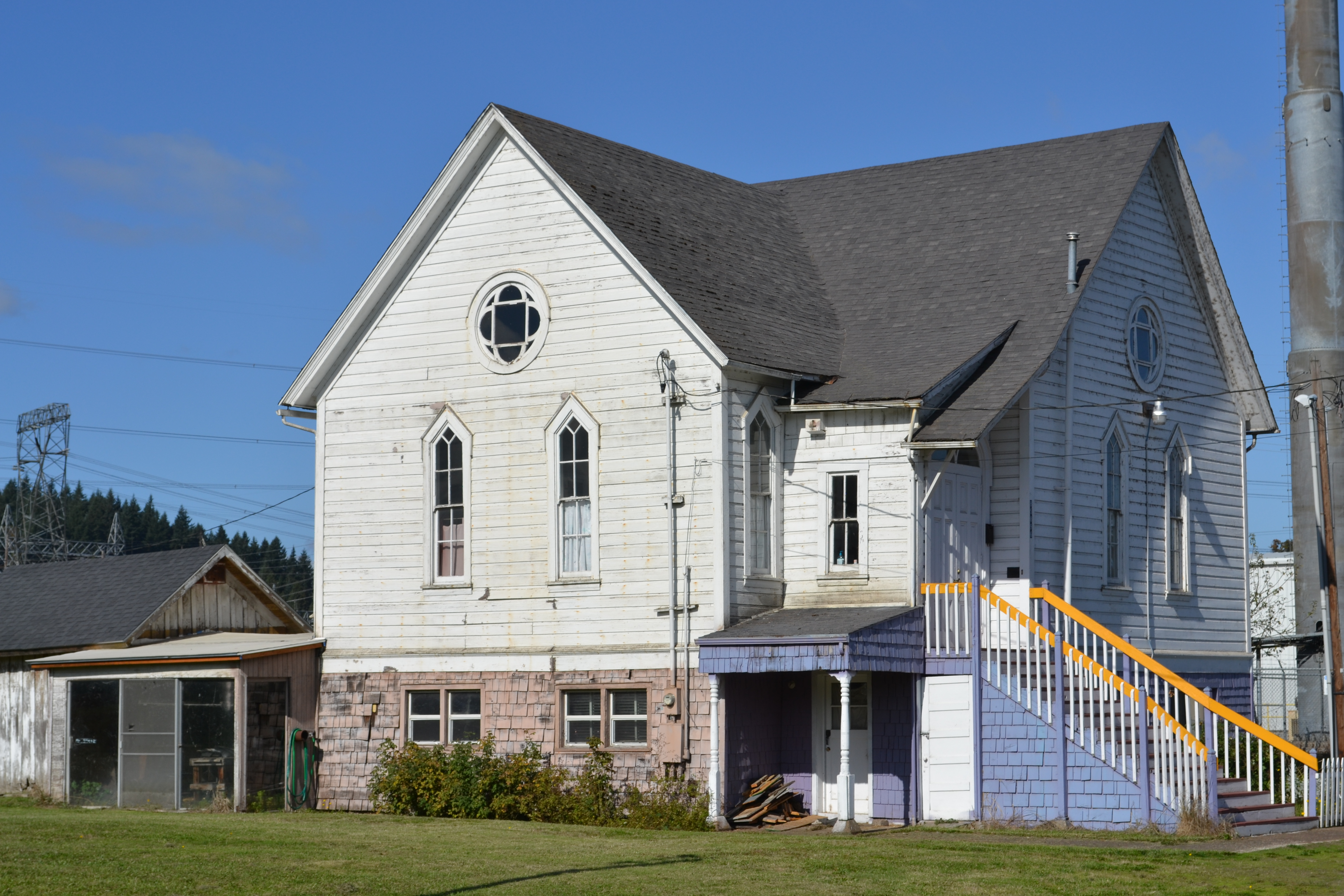
- Former Assembly of God church in Goshen

- Location within Oregon Location within the United States
- Coordinates: 43°59′43″N 123°0′41″W
- Country: United States
- State: Oregon
- County: Lane
- Elevation: 499 ft (152 m)
- Time zone: UTC-8 (Pacific (PST))
  - Summer (DST): UTC-7 (PDT)
- ZIP code: 97405
- Area codes: 458 and 541
- GNIS feature ID: 1136329

Goshen is an unincorporated community in Lane County, Oregon, United States. It is located at the junction of Oregon Route 58, Oregon Route 99, and Interstate 5.

== History ==
In 1853, there was stagecoach stop at what is now Goshen, on the stage line that led from Oregon City to the gold country in Jacksonville. The Goshen area was settled in the 1870s. Goshen post office was established in September 1874, with John Handsaker as first postmaster. In the Bible, Goshen was the pastoral land in lower Egypt occupied by the Israelites before the Exodus. An author for the Lane County Historian wrote that Goshen was named by John Jacob Hampton, although Oregon: End of the Trail says that it was named by Elijah Bristow. Bristow saw the area as a "land of promise." The post office was discontinued in 1957, when it became an Independent Rural Station of Eugene.

In 1884, Goshen was a station on the Oregon and California Railroad (later the Siskiyou Line of the Southern Pacific, and today the Central Oregon and Pacific), and the town had a store, blacksmith shop, and a school.

In 1940 Goshen had a population of 93.

The Methodist Episcopal Church of Goshen was built in 1910; as of 1990 it was a private residence. It is listed on the National Register of Historic Places. The Andrew J. Keeney House, built circa 1870, is also in the Goshen area.

== Economy ==
Goshen is the site of a Cone Lumber Company sawmill. At one time the community had a truckstop and a café. The truckstop and café were torn down in 1999 and replaced with a Pacific Pride commercial filling station.

== Education ==
Goshen School, which served grades K–8 in the Springfield School District, was closed in June 2011. It now houses the Willamette Leadership Academy, a charter school serving students in grades 6-12.
