= Oregon Route 58 =

State highway in Oregon, US

Oregon Route 58
- Route 58 highlighted in red

Route information
- Maintained by ODOT
- Length: 86.75 mi (139.61 km)
- Existed: 1932–present

Major junctions
- West end: I-5 / OR 99 at Goshen
- East end: US 97 near Chemult

Location
- Country: United States
- State: Oregon

Highway system
- Oregon Highways; Interstate; US; State; Named; Scenic
← OR 53	→ OR 62

Oregon Route 58 (OR 58), also known as the Willamette Highway No. 18 (see Oregon highways and routes), is a state highway in the U.S. state of Oregon. The route, signed east–west, runs in a southeast–northwest direction, connecting U.S. Route 97 north of Chemult with Interstate 5 south of Eugene. It links the Willamette Valley and Central Oregon, crossing the Cascade Range at Willamette Pass. OR 58 is generally a modern two-lane highway with a speed limit of 55 mph (88 km/h), built through the Willamette National Forest in the 1930s.

OR 58 is a designated freight route, forming one of several connections between I-5 and US 97, which leads back to I-5 at Weed, California. This is a popular alternate route for trucks on the I-5 corridor, avoiding the steep grades and winter closures of I-5 over Siskiyou Summit. The highway is also on the National Highway System, and is classified as an expressway southeast of Odell Lake. (US 97 is also classified as such south to the state line, and in California it is part of the Freeway and Expressway System.) This matches the general routes of the 1887 Oregon and California Railroad over Siskiyou Summit and the 1926 Natron Cutoff along OR 58 and US 97; the latter is now part of the Union Pacific Railroad's I-5 Corridor rail line, while the former is the Central Oregon and Pacific Railroad shortline.

== Route description ==
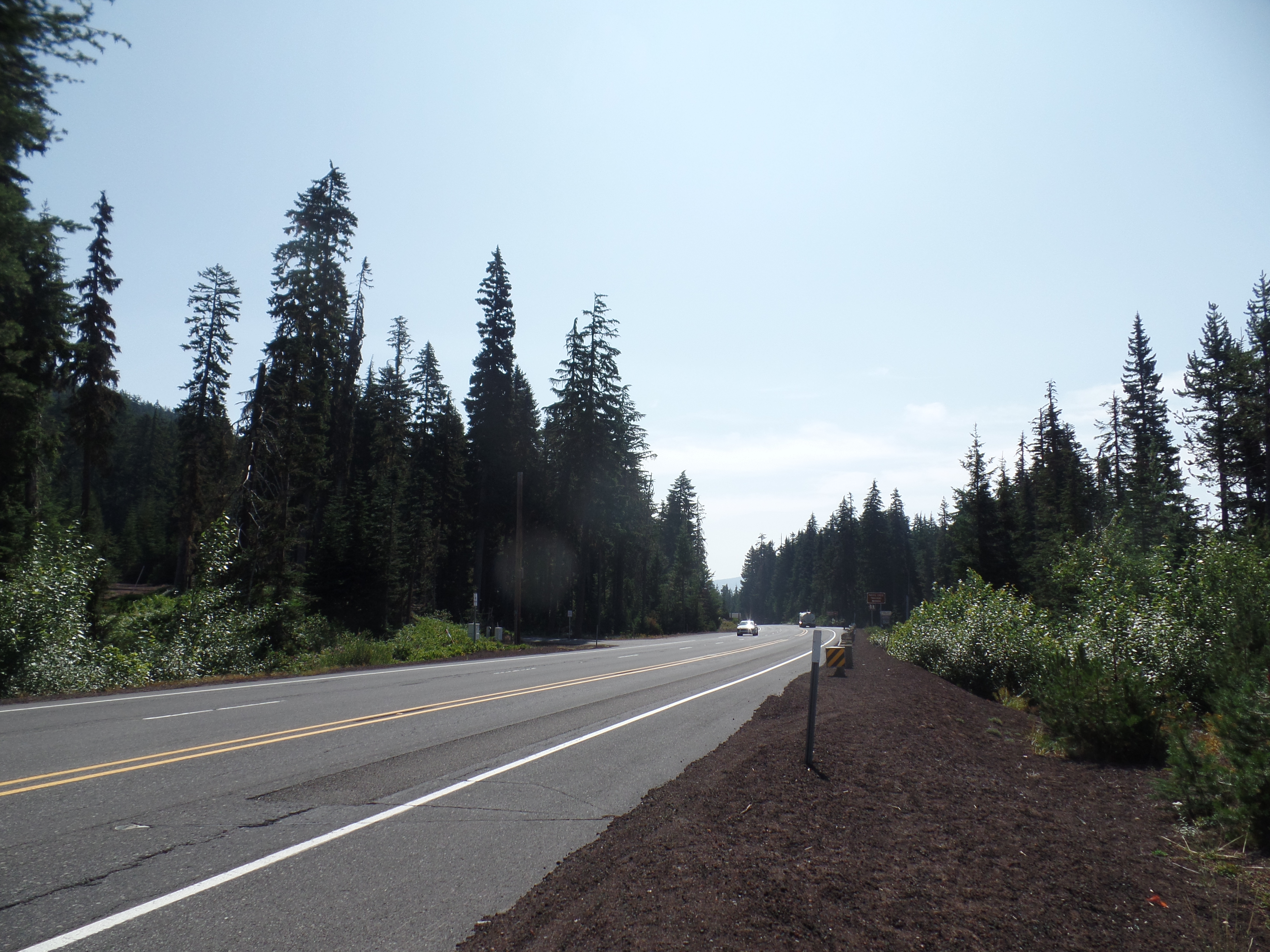
Route 58 at Willamette Pass

Oregon Route 58 begins (at its western terminus) at an interchange with Interstate 5 and Oregon Route 99 near Goshen, located between the cities of Eugene and Creswell. It heads due southeast from there, following the course of the Willamette River into the foothills of the Cascade Mountains. The highway passes several lakes, including Dexter Lake and Lookout Point Lake, and provides access to the town of Lowell. Further into the mountains, it passes through the cities of Oakridge and Westfir. It continues past Heckletooth Mountain and McCredie Springs, into the mountains up the Salt Creek canyon, to the summit of Willamette Pass, after which it descends into central Oregon. Oregon Route 58 terminates at an interchange with U.S. Route 97.

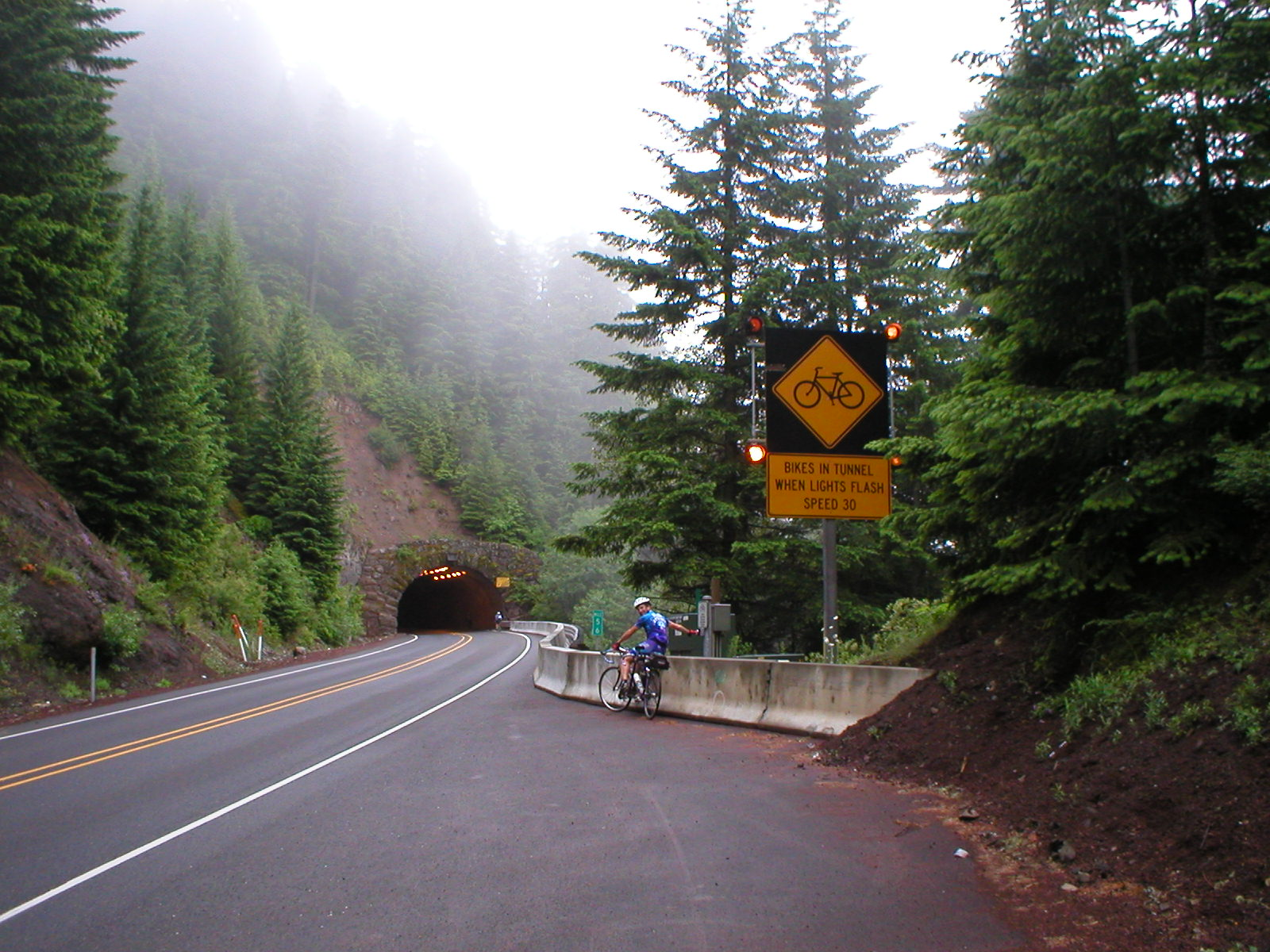
The Salt Creek Tunnel

Oregon Route 58 is of high importance as a freight corridor. It is the primary route between the Willamette Valley and south-central Oregon, including the Klamath Falls region. It also is the preferred route to points further southeast, including Reno, Nevada. Finally, it is an important alternate route for traffic moving up and down the West Coast, as bad weather frequently closes Interstate 5 at the Siskiyou Summit during the winter. The Union Pacific Railroad I-5 Corridor main line through Oregon and California roughly follows OR 58 and US 97. While a rail line exists through Siskiyou Summit, it is difficult for trains to use even in good weather, due to an excessively steep grade, and is often uneconomical to use in winter weather. It is common for West Coast truck traffic to prefer OR 58 and US 97 to Interstate 5 for the same reason.

Two scenic byways—the West Cascades Scenic Byway and the Cascade Lakes Scenic Byway—intersect with OR 58.

== History ==
By the 1850s, Emigrant Pass, slightly south of OR 58's crossing at Willamette Pass, was being used by emigrants to the Oregon Territory as a way over the Cascades. In October 1853, a party of 1,500 was almost stranded at the pass, but was saved from a Donner Party-style tragedy by nearby settlers who had begun to improve the route up the Middle Fork Willamette River earlier that year as a shortcut between the Oregon Trail near Boise, Idaho, and the Willamette Valley.

In July 1865, the United States Congress authorized the construction of the Oregon Central Military Wagon Road from Eugene to Fort Boise in Idaho. To finance the construction, the government offered land grants along the route. Eventually, the Oregon Central Military Wagon Road Company would build 420 miles (680 km) of road and claim about 806,400 acres (3,263 km^{2}). However, scandal and lawsuits regarding the quality of the road and its route reduced the amount of land actually patented by the company to approximately 235,568 acres (953.31 km^{2}). Today, Oregon Route 58 follows the first leg of the Oregon Central military road from Eugene over the Cascades to Central Oregon.

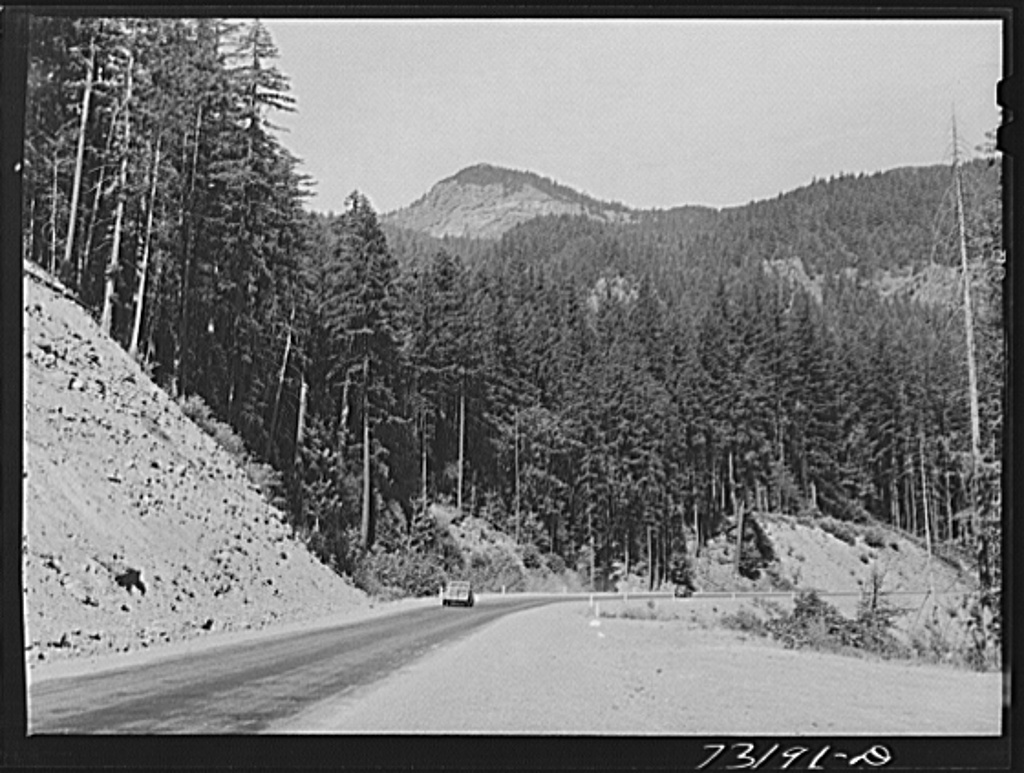
OR 58 through the Willamette National Forest, 1942

The Oregon State Highway Commission added the Willamette Highway No. 18, from Goshen via Oakridge to Crescent, to the state highway system on November 24, 1922. The road was entirely unimproved when it was taken over, and improvement progressed slowly from the Goshen end. The roadway received the signed Oregon Route 58 designation in 1932, when the Oregon Route system was first laid out. A major realignment, crossing the Cascades at Willamette Pass rather than Emigrant Pass, was designed in 1933, and incorporated a number of "half viaducts" built into the hillside and one tunnel (the Salt Creek Tunnel) in order "not to scar the hillsides more than is absolutely necessary" through the Willamette National Forest. An opening ceremony for the highway, thought at the time to be the last major highway that the state would build, was held on July 30, 1940. The road remained partially oiled gravel until the mid-1960s.

== Major intersections ==
County	Location	mi	km	Destinations	Notes
Lane	Goshen	−0.30– 0.20	−0.48– 0.32	I-5 / OR 99 – Eugene, Roseburg	
Lane	Coast Fork Willamette River	2.42– 2.50	3.89– 4.02	Truss bridge	
Lane		2.64	4.25	To OR 222 south (Cloverdale Road) – Creswell	
Lane		5.73	9.22	OR 222 north (Parkway Road) – Jasper, Jasper Park, Springfield	
Lane		13.19	21.23	Jasper–Lowell Road (Lowell Bridge) – Lowell, Fall Creek Dam	
Lane		31.39	50.52	Westfir Road – Westfir	Leads to the West Cascades Scenic Byway
Lane	Oakridge	35.48	57.10	Crestview Street	
Lane		56.01– 56.18	90.14– 90.41	Salt Creek Tunnel	
Klamath	Crescent Lake Junction	69.41	111.70	OR 429 (Crescent Lake Highway) – Crescent Lake	
Klamath		72.90	117.32	Crescent Cutoff Road – Davis Lake, US 97	Cascade Lakes Scenic Byway
Klamath		86.45	139.13	US 97 – Chemult, Klamath Falls, Crescent, Bend	
1.000 mi = 1.609 km; 1.000 km = 0.621 mi
