= Cloverdale, Lane County, Oregon =

Unincorporated community in Oregon, US

Coordinates: 43°55′29″N 122°58′02″W

Cloverdale is an unincorporated community in Lane County, Oregon, United States. It is approximately 3 miles (5 km) northeast of Creswell on Oregon Route 222.

Cloverdale was the site of one of the first sawmills in Lane County, built in 1851. A gristmill was added in 1852. A townsite was laid out at Cloverdale in 1855, but the plat was later canceled. Cloverdale was considered a "thing of the past" as early as 1884. At one time Cloverdale had a store, and a school, and a blacksmith forge. The former Cloverdale Methodist Episcopal Church now serves as a wedding chapel. The church was built in 1904, and later served Baptist and Mennonite congregations and then as a community hall. The building was purchased by the McKinlay family in 1999 and restored. The school building, constructed in 1911, is also still standing.
