= Westfir, Oregon =

- City
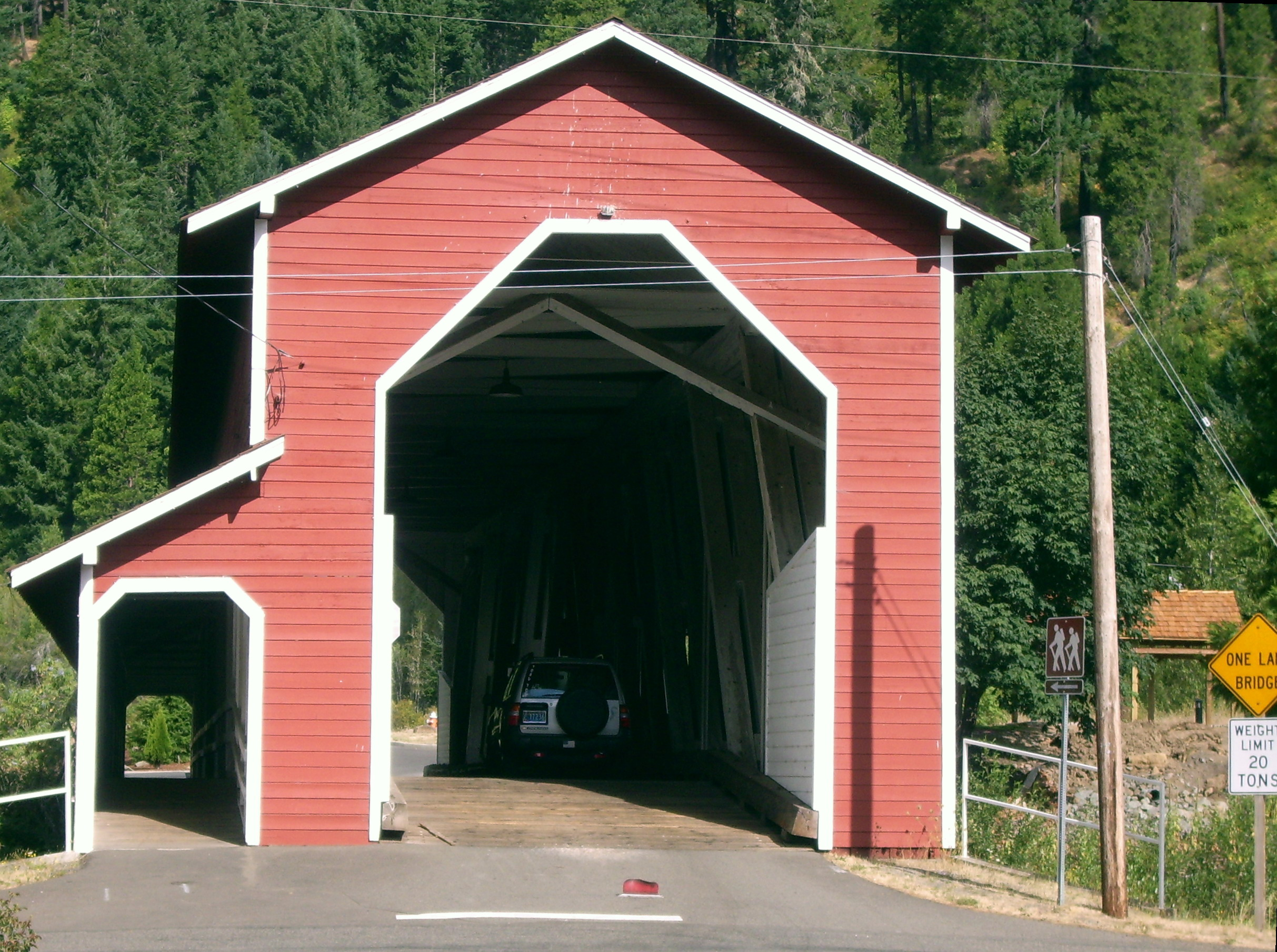
- Office Covered Bridge, Westfir, Oregon

- Location in Oregon
- Coordinates: 43°45′29″N 122°30′12″W
- Country: United States
- State: Oregon
- County: Lane
- Incorporated: 1979

Area
  - Total: 0.32 sq mi (0.82 km^{2})
  - Land: 0.31 sq mi (0.81 km^{2})
  - Water: 0.0039 sq mi (0.01 km^{2})
- Elevation: 1,070 ft (330 m)

Population (2020)
  - Total: 259
  - Density: 825.5/sq mi (318.71/km^{2})
- Time zone: UTC-8 (Pacific)
  - Summer (DST): UTC-7 (Pacific)
- ZIP code: 97492
- Area code: 541
- FIPS code: 41-79950
- GNIS feature ID: 2412234
- Website: www.ci.westfir.or.us

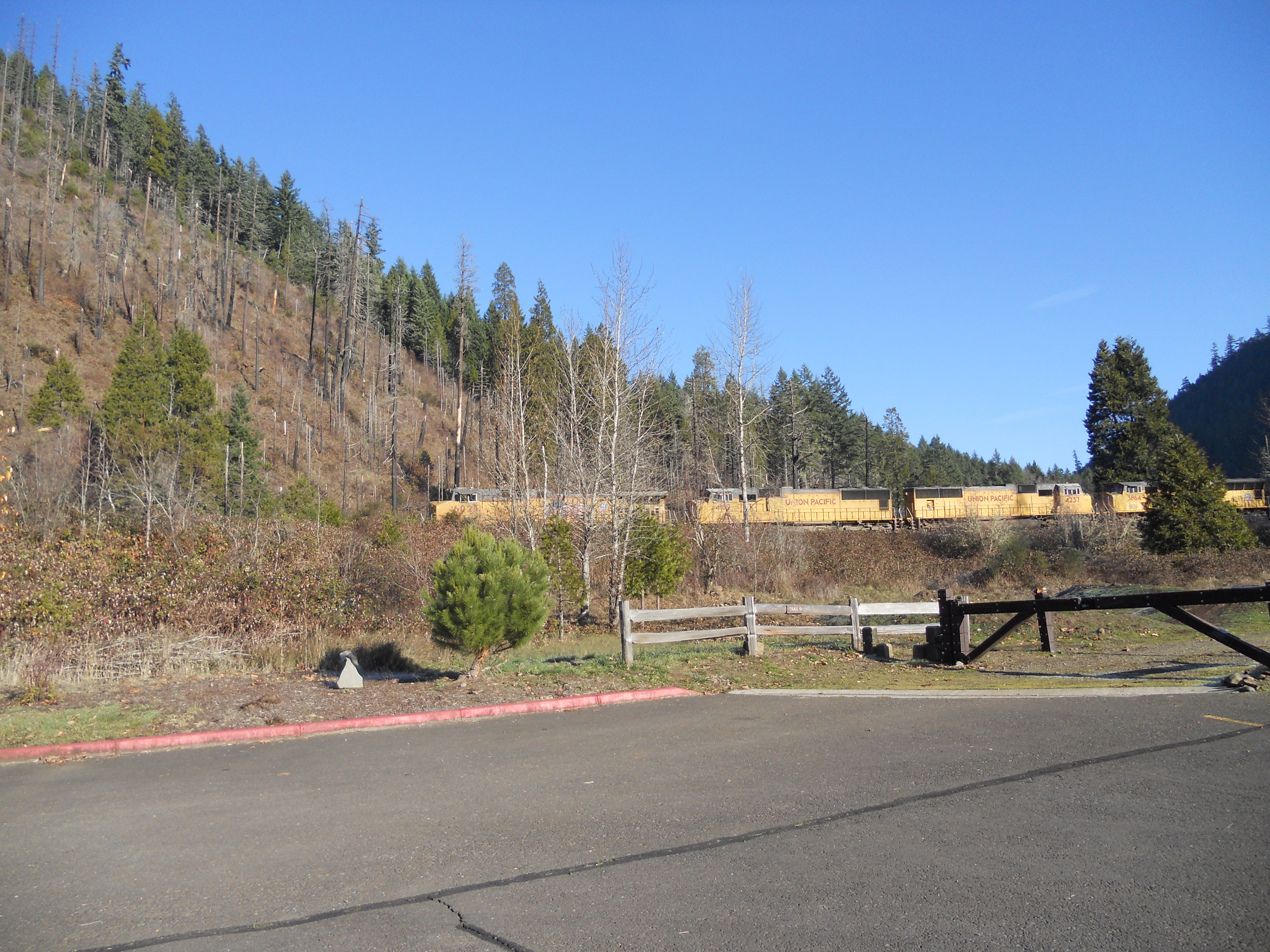
A locomotive on the Union Pacific Railroad passing by Westfir

Westfir is a city in Lane County, Oregon, United States. The population was 259 at the 2020 census. It is located about 40 miles (64 km) southeast of Eugene and about 4 miles (6 km) west of Oakridge in the Willamette National Forest.

== History ==
The name Westfir was first used for the community in July 1923. The name came from the Western Lumber Company, which produced Douglas-fir lumber and had established Westfir as a company town. A major customer of the mill at this time was the Southern Pacific Railroad, which was building its line over Willamette Pass between Eugene and Klamath Falls in the 1920s and passing through Westfir. Westfir post office was established in November 1923. The population in 1931 was 500. The Western Lumber sawmill was later sold to the Westfir Lumber Company and in 1946 to the Edward Hines Lumber Company. Hines established a plywood mill in Westfir in 1952. In 1977, Hines closed the mills and sold the entire town, including the water and sewer system. The town's new owners wanted the utilities to be in public ownership, so local residents voted to incorporate in 1979. The mill operations closed in 1984, after a series of fires.

Oregon's longest existing covered bridge, the Office Bridge, was built across the North Fork Middle Fork Willamette River in 1944 to connect the Westfir Lumber Company mill to the main office.

== Geography ==
According to the United States Census Bureau, the city has a total area of 0.33 square miles (0.85 km^{2}), all of it land.

=== Climate ===
This region experiences warm (but not hot) and dry summers, with no average monthly temperatures above 71.6 °F. According to the Köppen Climate Classification system, Westfir has a warm-summer Mediterranean climate, abbreviated "Csb" on climate maps.

== Demographics ==
Historical population
Census	Pop.	Note	%±
1980	312		—
1990	278		−10.9%
2000	276		−0.7%
2010	253		−8.3%
2020	259		2.4%
U.S. Decennial Census

=== 2020 census ===
As of the 2020 census, Westfir had a population of 259. The median age was 54.8 years; 15.8% of residents were under the age of 18 and 28.6% of residents were 65 years of age or older. For every 100 females there were 103.9 males, and for every 100 females age 18 and over there were 111.7 males age 18 and over.

0% of residents lived in urban areas, while 100.0% lived in rural areas.

There were 113 households in Westfir, of which 27.4% had children under the age of 18 living in them. Of all households, 44.2% were married-couple households, 23.9% were households with a male householder and no spouse or partner present, and 25.7% were households with a female householder and no spouse or partner present. About 17.7% of all households were made up of individuals and 5.3% had someone living alone who was 65 years of age or older.

There were 129 housing units, of which 12.4% were vacant. Among occupied housing units, 82.3% were owner-occupied and 17.7% were renter-occupied. The homeowner vacancy rate was 1.1% and the rental vacancy rate was 12.5%.

Racial composition as of the 2020 census
Race	Number	Percent
White	226	87.3%
Black or African American	2	0.8%
American Indian and Alaska Native	3	1.2%
Asian	1	0.4%
Native Hawaiian and Other Pacific Islander	0	0%
Some other race	4	1.5%
Two or more races	23	8.9%
Hispanic or Latino (of any race)	7	2.7%

=== 2010 census ===
As of the census of 2010, there were 253 people, 114 households, and 74 families living in the city. The population density was 766.7 inhabitants per square mile (296.0/km^{2}). There were 132 housing units at an average density of 400.0 per square mile (154.4/km^{2}). The racial makeup of the city was 92.1% White, 0.4% African American, 1.6% Native American, 0.4% Asian, 0.8% from other races, and 4.7% from two or more races. Hispanic or Latino of any race were 2.0% of the population.

There were 114 households, of which 18.4% had children under the age of 18 living with them, 47.4% were married couples living together, 8.8% had a female householder with no husband present, 8.8% had a male householder with no wife present, and 35.1% were non-families. 29.8% of all households were made up of individuals, and 7% had someone living alone who was 65 years of age or older. The average household size was 2.22 and the average family size was 2.70.

The median age in the city was 51.1 years. 19.8% of residents were under the age of 18; 1.9% were between the ages of 18 and 24; 20.5% were from 25 to 44; 39.2% were from 45 to 64; and 18.6% were 65 years of age or older. The gender makeup of the city was 54.2% male and 45.8% female.

=== 2000 census ===
As of the census of 2000, there were 276 people, 100 households, and 74 families living in the city. The population density was 789.9 inhabitants per square mile (305.0/km^{2}). There were 106 housing units at an average density of 303.4 per square mile (117.1/km^{2}). The racial makeup of the city was 99.28% White and 0.72% Native American. Hispanic or Latino of any race were 1.09% of the population.

There were 100 households, out of which 37.0% had children under the age of 18 living with them, 66.0% were married couples living together, 5.0% had a female householder with no husband present, and 26.0% were non-families. 21.0% of all households were made up of individuals, and 6.0% had someone living alone who was 65 years of age or older. The average household size was 2.76 and the average family size was 3.22.

In the city, the population was spread out, with 30.1% under the age of 18, 4.7% from 18 to 24, 27.5% from 25 to 44, 24.3% from 45 to 64, and 13.4% who were 65 years of age or older. The median age was 38 years. For every 100 females, there were 120.8 males. For every 100 females age 18 and over, there were 119.3 males.

The median income for a household in the city was $32,031, and the median income for a family was $31,875. Males had a median income of $27,500 versus $24,375 for females. The per capita income for the city was $11,324. About 8.9% of families and 12.2% of the population were below the poverty line, including 15.5% of those under the age of 18 and 7.4% of those 65 or over.

== Economy ==
The three largest employers in the Westfir area are the Oakridge School District, the national forest service and Willamette Pass Ski Area.

== Education ==
Westfir students are served by the Oakridge School District, which has an elementary, middle, and high school in Oakridge. Westfir Middle School closed in 2006, after serving for a time as the district's middle school. The Westfir school district merged with the Oakridge school district in 1967.

== Media ==
The Dead Mountain Echo was a weekly newspaper published in Oakridge that also served the Westfir community. It closed in 2020.
