= Dead Mountain Echo =

Newspaper published in Oregon, U.S.

- Type: Weekly newspaper
- Founder: Dennis Keffer
- Founded: 1973
- Ceased publication: September 2020
- Language: English
- City: Oakridge, Oregon
- Circulation: 465
- OCLC number: 23860553

The Dead Mountain Echo was a weekly newspaper published Tuesdays in Oakridge in the U.S. state of Oregon from 1973 to 2020. The Echo was a general member of the Oregon Newspaper Publishers Association, and its coverage was mentioned or picked up by various neighboring news organizations. Its circulation was reported as 465.

== History ==
Dennis Keffer started the Dead Mountain Echo in 1973. Keffer had little journalism experience at the time and created the paper with an initial investment of $300 and a IBM standard type-writer. But within two years he was able to grow circulation to 1,500 and gross $50,000 annually. This was in spite of competition from the Oakridge Telegram, which was more than two decades older. Larry Roberts became Echo publisher as some point. Viki Burns also worked at the paper for a time.

After the Echo ceased in 2020, Doug Bates launched a digital news outlet called the Highway 58 Herald. Bates was a two-time Pulitzer Prize winner. He left the paper after eight months and was succeeded by George Custer. He planned to retire and pass down the Herald to Ellie Graham in March 2026. The Herald announced in August 2026 that it would officially cease on September 15 due to "financial reasons only."

== Achievements ==
When it launched in the 1970s, the Echo drove a 70-year competitor out of business. In 1975, the Echo won the "general excellence" award for small weeklies from the ONPA. Award-winning journalist Alan Robertson got his start in the newspaper business at the Echo in 1978. In 1980, the paper took second place in the "Special Issue" category in the ONPA awards. Tom Henderson, a humor/opinion columnist in northern Idaho, made several references to the Echo in his column in the 2000s.
