= Office Bridge =

Covered bridge in Oregon, US

- U.S. National Register of Historic Places
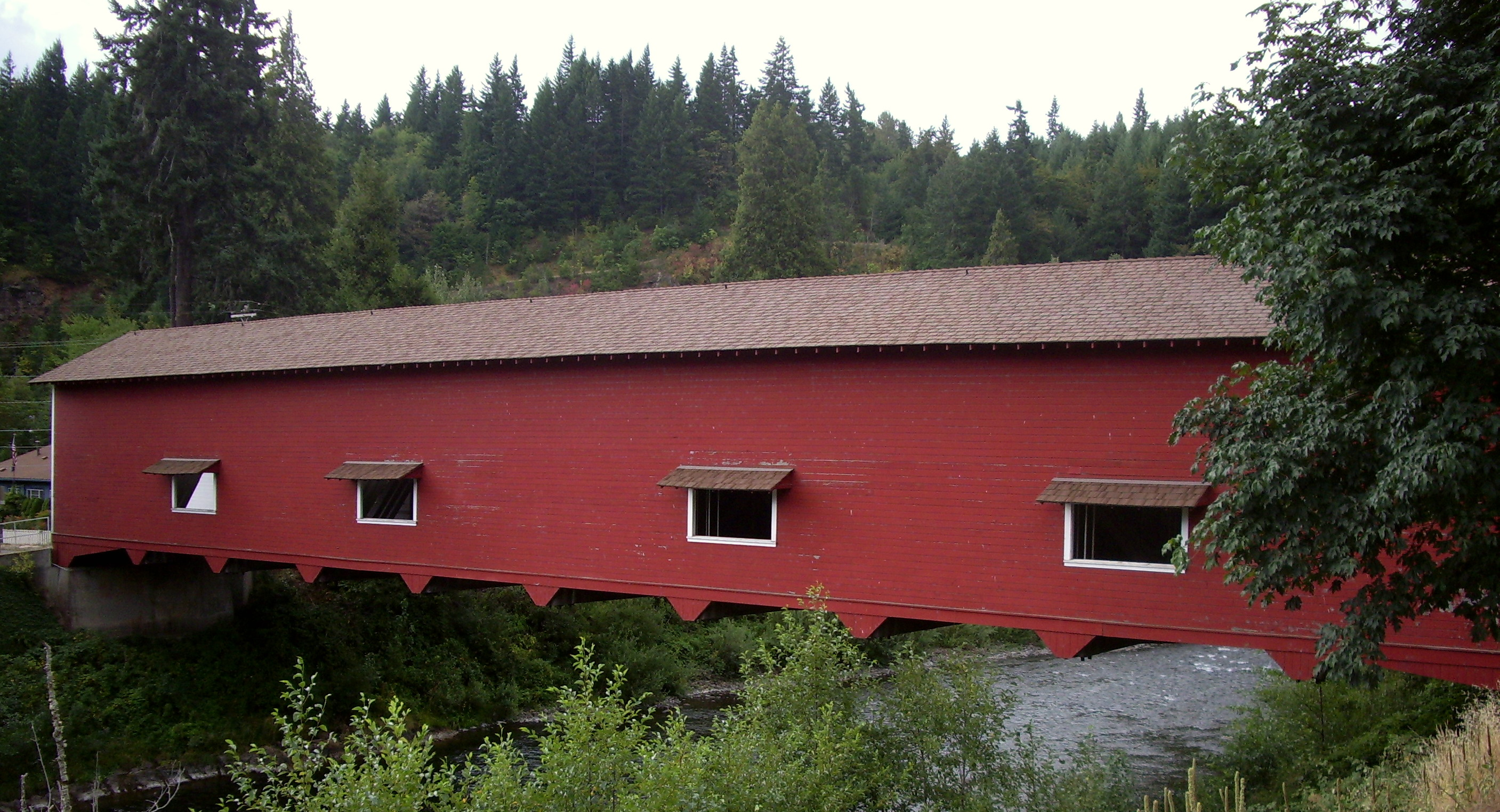
- Office Bridge and North Fork Middle Fork Willamette River
- Location: Westfir, Oregon
- Coordinates: 43.75847°N 122.49571°W
- NRHP reference No.: 79003768
- Added to NRHP: 1979

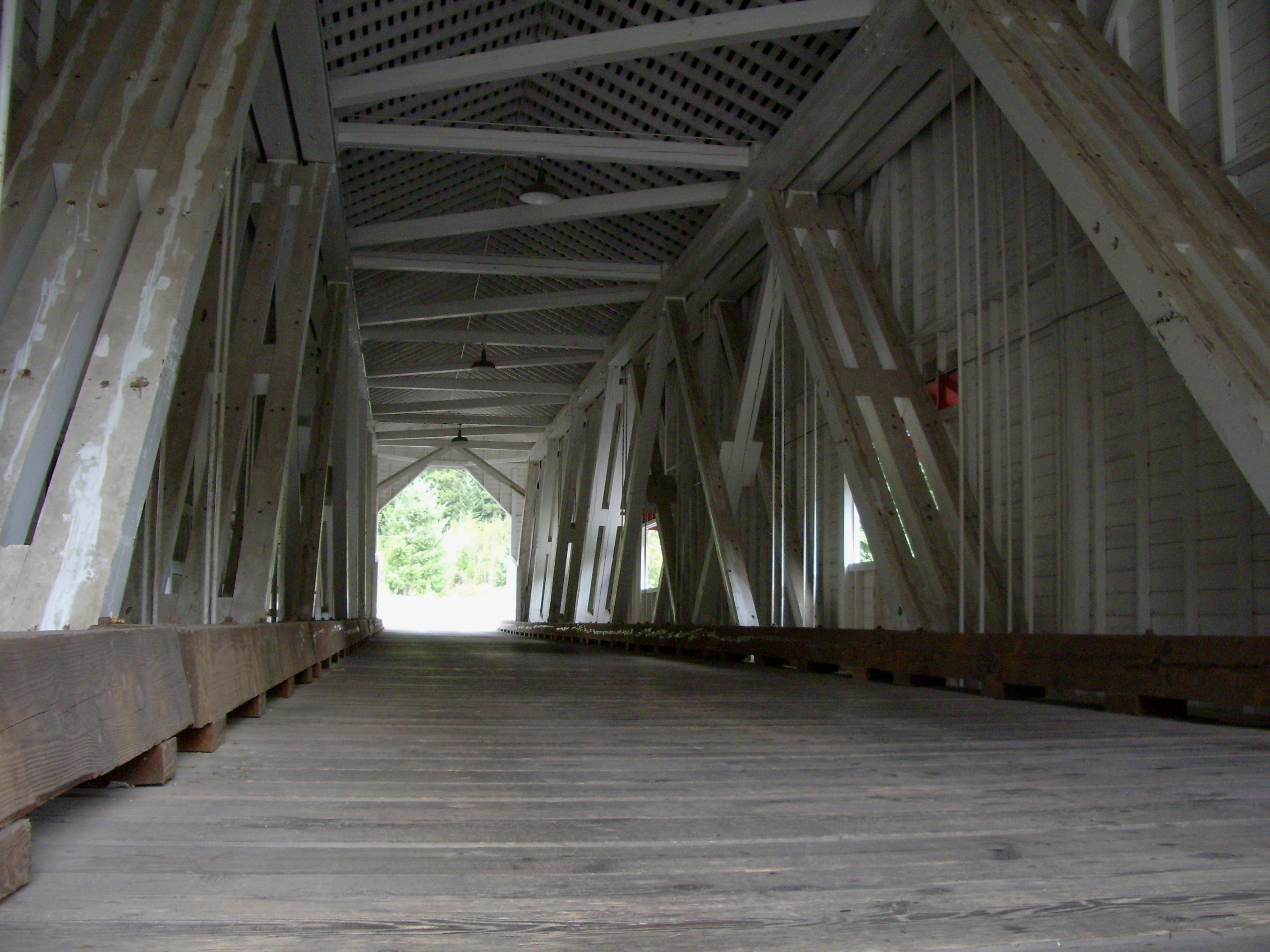
Interior of bridge shows strong construction intended for heavy vehicles

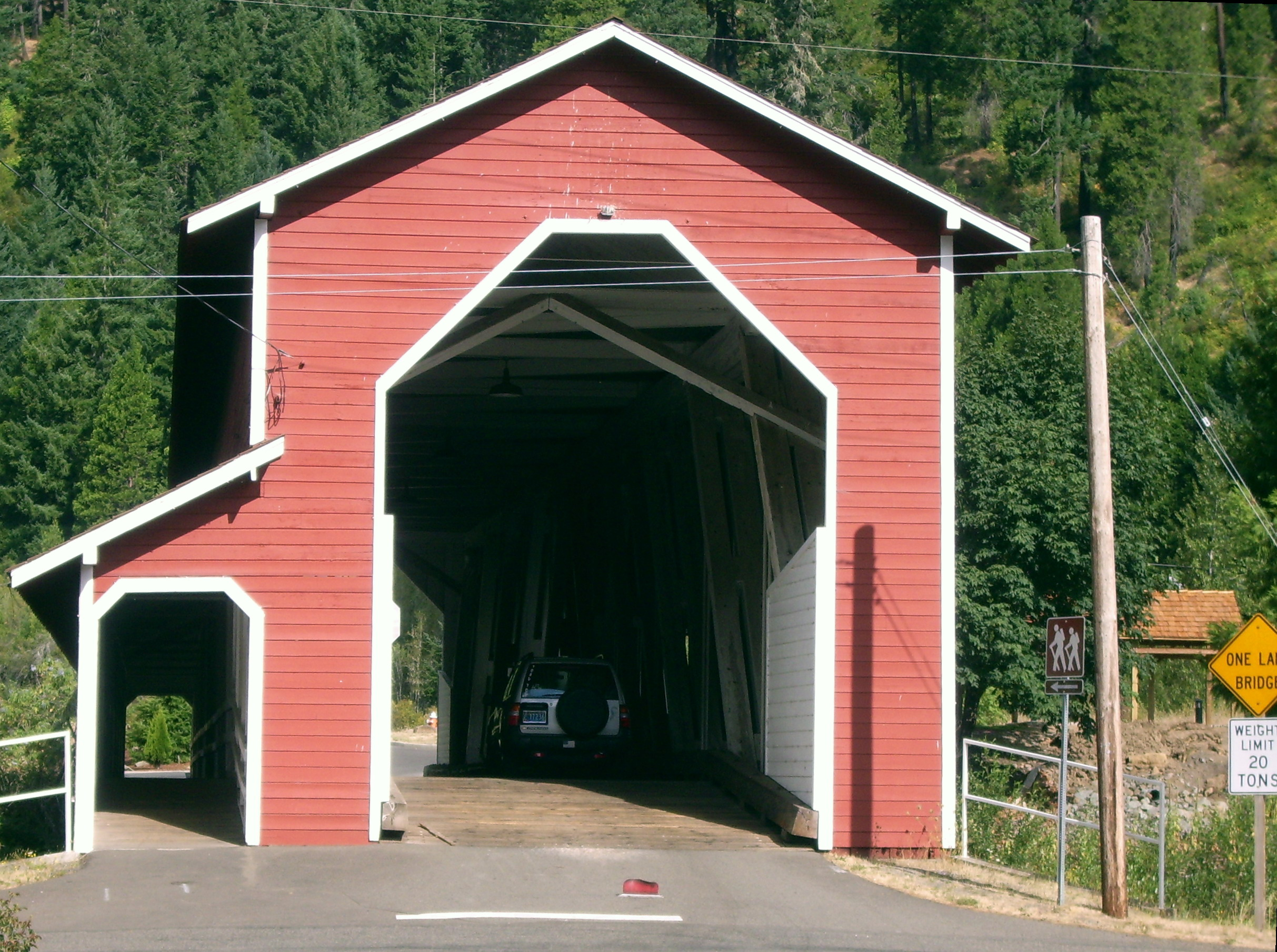
Separate pedestrian walkway

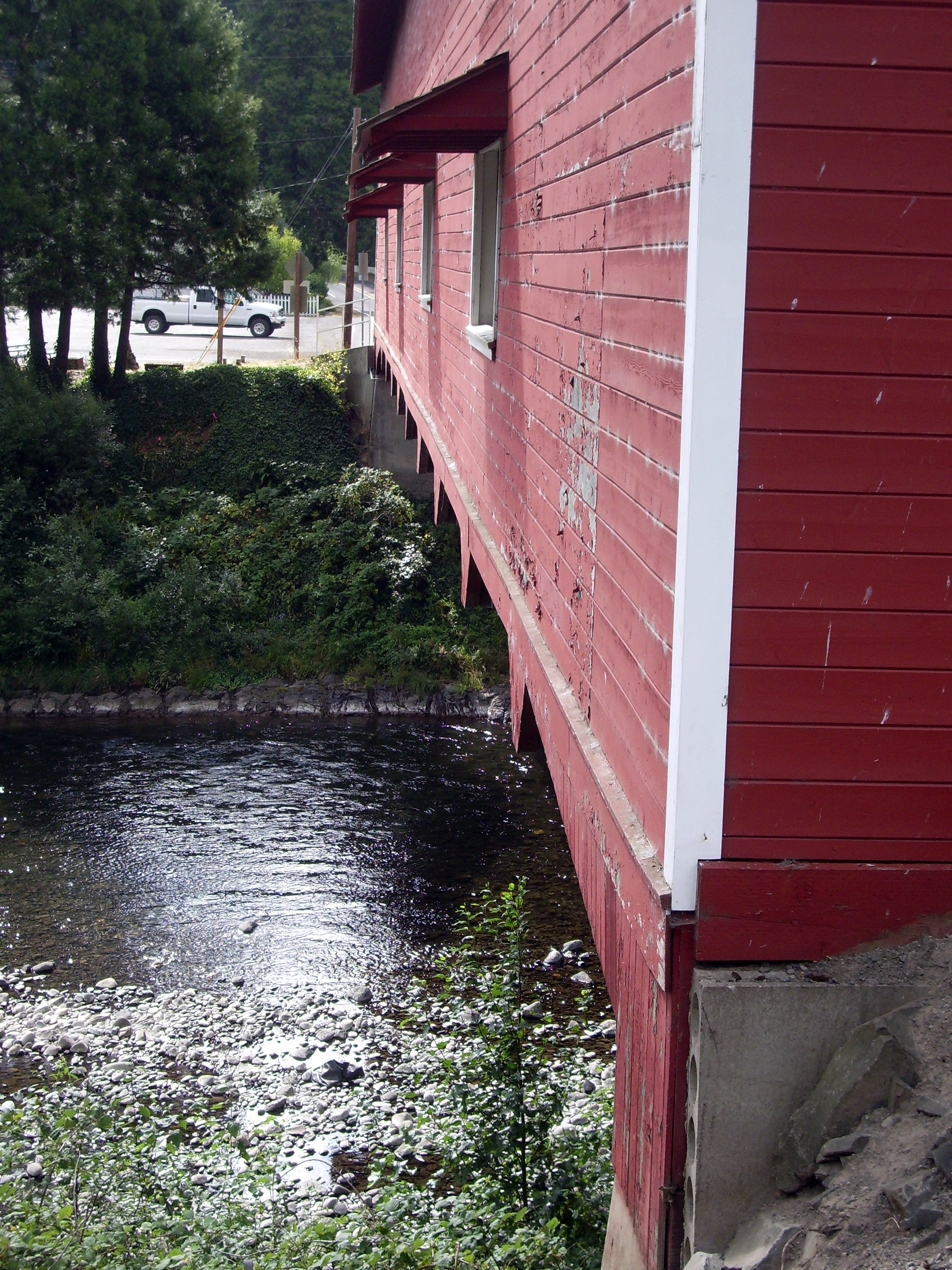
The North Fork Middle Fork Willamette River in early fall

The Office Bridge (also called Westfir Covered Bridge) is a covered bridge in Westfir, Lane County, Oregon, U.S. crossing the North Fork Middle Fork Willamette River at the south end of the Aufderheide National Scenic Byway and edge of the Willamette National Forest. It is Oregon's longest covered bridge at 180 ft (55 m), and is one of only two in the state using triple Howe truss construction. It is the only covered bridge west of the Mississippi River which has a separate pedestrian walkway.

The bridge is a replacement for a 1941 bridge which washed away. It was built in 1944 by the Westfir Lumber Company to carry logging trucks and lumber trucks to the company's lumber mill and mill pond. The company headquarters and offices were located across the river beside National Forest Development Road 19, in what is now a bed and breakfast. The bed and breakfast retains the company's walk-in safe.

The company-owned town of Westfir, the mill, and the bridge were sold to an investment firm in 1977. The lumber mill burned to the ground in the early 1980s. In 1992 the bridge ownership changed to Lane County due to property tax foreclosure. Extensive structural work in 1993 stabilized the bridge. In 2002, the roof was replaced.

Formerly, the bridge was closed to public access. In about 2003, a small park was established on the north side of the bridge. The park also serves as a trailhead to North Fork Trail #3666, which follows the Wild and Scenic section of the North Fork river. The Wild and Scenic designation ends a few hundred feet upriver from the bridge.

Each Christmas season, the town decorates the bridge with lights. A firetruck driven by Santa Claus turns the lights on the first week after Thanksgiving.

== See also ==
- List of bridges documented by the Historic American Engineering Record in Oregon
- List of bridges on the National Register of Historic Places in Oregon
- List of Oregon covered bridges
