= Odell Lake (Oregon) =

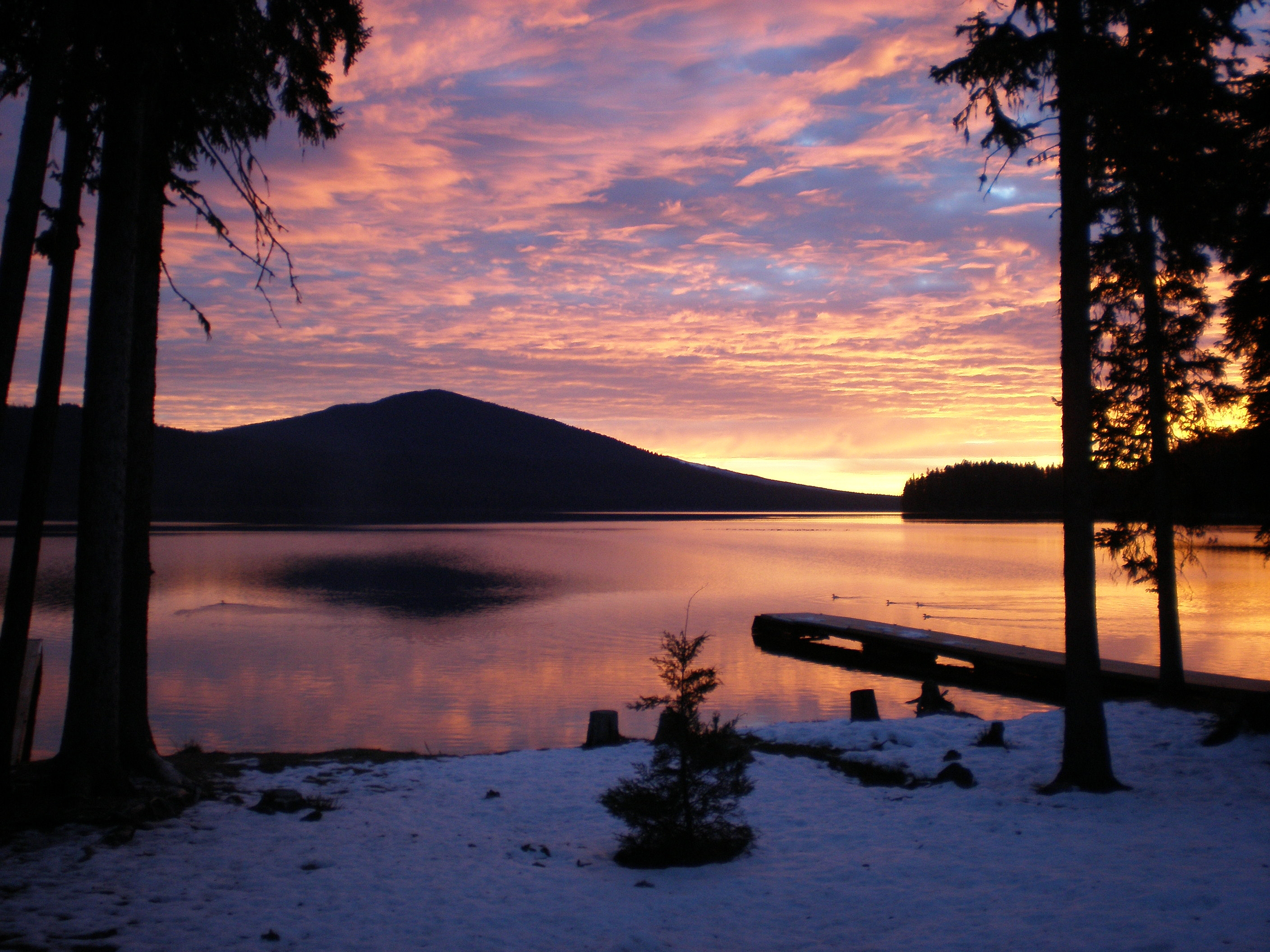
- The lake at sunrise

- Location within Oregon Location within the United States
- Location: Klamath County, Oregon
- Coordinates: 43°34′22″N 121°59′54″W
- Type: natural lake without dam
- Primary inflows: Trapper Creek
- Primary outflows: Odell Creek
- Catchment area: 37 sq mi (96 km^{2})
- Basin countries: United States
- Max. length: 6 mi (9.7 km)
- Max. width: 1.5 mi (2.4 km)
- Surface area: 3,582 acres (1,450 ha)
- Average depth: 132 ft (40 m)
- Max. depth: 282 ft (86 m)
- Water volume: 473,900 acre⋅ft (0.5845 km^{3})
- Residence time: 8 years
- Shore length^{1}: 13.3 mi (21.4 km)
- Surface elevation: 4,787 ft (1,459 m)
- ^{1} Shore length is not a well-defined measure.

Odell Lake is located near Willamette Pass in the northwest corner of Klamath County, Oregon, United States. It is one of several lakes in the Cascade Range in Central Oregon, and lies within the Deschutes National Forest. It was named for Oregon Surveyor General William Holman Odell by Bynon J. Pengra, in July 1865, while they were making a preliminary survey for the Oregon Central Military Road, which would later become Oregon Route 58. The lake fills a basin carved by a glacier, and the resulting terminal moraine confines the water along the lake's southeast shore.

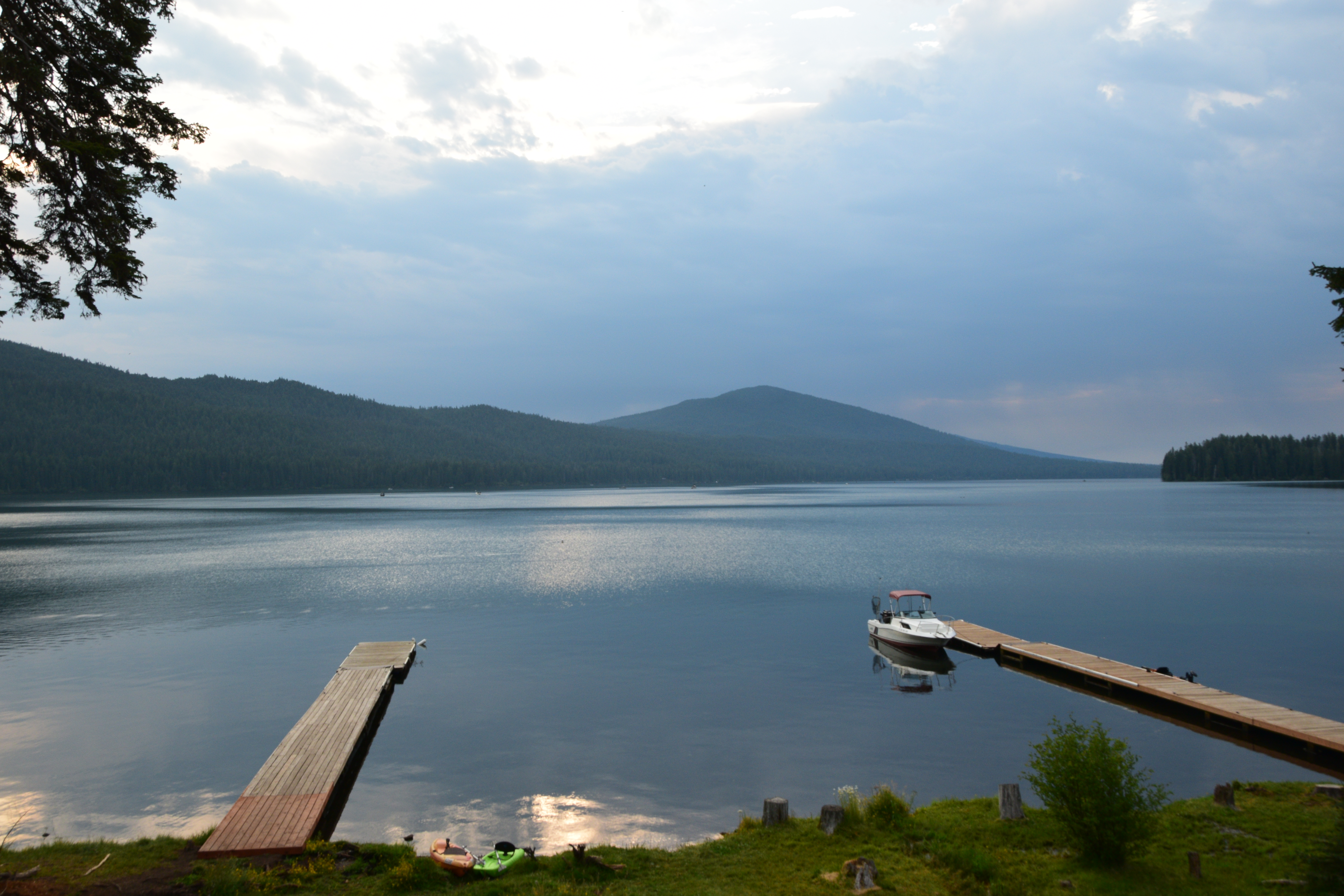
Odell Lake in the Summer

== Community ==
The populated place of Odell Lake, Oregon, is on the lake's southeast end at 43.549013°N 121.964752°W and was once a station on the Southern Pacific Railroad's Cascade Line between Crescent Lake station and Cascade Summit. The place was also known as Odell Lake Resort, and today is the site of Odell Lake Lodge. The historic lodge building was constructed in 1903. In the 1930s on the west end of the lake another resort, Shelter Cove Resort which includes cabins, camping sites, RV parking, and docks for boating.

== Climate ==
Climate data for Odell Lake, Oregon, 1991–2020 normals, 1974–2020 extremes: 4800ft (1463m)
Month	Jan	Feb	Mar	Apr	May	Jun	Jul	Aug	Sep	Oct	Nov	Dec	Year
Record high °F (°C)	58 (14)	60 (16)	68 (20)	77 (25)	97 (36)	93 (34)	95 (35)	105 (41)	97 (36)	87 (31)	65 (18)	56 (13)	105 (41)
Mean maximum °F (°C)	47.7 (8.7)	50.8 (10.4)	56.9 (13.8)	65.8 (18.8)	75.5 (24.2)	82.3 (27.9)	87.7 (30.9)	89.4 (31.9)	83.7 (28.7)	72.4 (22.4)	56.5 (13.6)	45.7 (7.6)	91.1 (32.8)
Mean daily maximum °F (°C)	35.2 (1.8)	37.6 (3.1)	41.8 (5.4)	46.3 (7.9)	55.5 (13.1)	62.8 (17.1)	73.0 (22.8)	74.2 (23.4)	67.9 (19.9)	55.0 (12.8)	40.9 (4.9)	34.1 (1.2)	52.0 (11.1)
Daily mean °F (°C)	27.8 (−2.3)	29.1 (−1.6)	32.7 (0.4)	37.0 (2.8)	44.7 (7.1)	50.6 (10.3)	58.6 (14.8)	58.2 (14.6)	52.0 (11.1)	42.7 (5.9)	33.2 (0.7)	26.9 (−2.8)	41.1 (5.1)
Mean daily minimum °F (°C)	20.4 (−6.4)	20.6 (−6.3)	23.6 (−4.7)	27.6 (−2.4)	34.0 (1.1)	38.3 (3.5)	44.2 (6.8)	42.3 (5.7)	36.1 (2.3)	30.4 (−0.9)	25.5 (−3.6)	19.7 (−6.8)	30.2 (−1.0)
Mean minimum °F (°C)	5.0 (−15.0)	6.1 (−14.4)	11.4 (−11.4)	19.9 (−6.7)	25.3 (−3.7)	30.3 (−0.9)	34.7 (1.5)	33.4 (0.8)	27.4 (−2.6)	19.8 (−6.8)	10.5 (−11.9)	4.1 (−15.5)	−2.1 (−18.9)
Record low °F (°C)	−15 (−26)	−16 (−27)	2 (−17)	5 (−15)	18 (−8)	25 (−4)	28 (−2)	21 (−6)	19 (−7)	0 (−18)	−10 (−23)	−18 (−28)	−18 (−28)
Average precipitation inches (mm)	5.73 (146)	4.70 (119)	3.34 (85)	1.91 (49)	1.84 (47)	1.02 (26)	0.52 (13)	0.45 (11)	0.96 (24)	2.62 (67)	4.69 (119)	6.05 (154)	33.83 (860)
Average snowfall inches (cm)	48.80 (124.0)	28.60 (72.6)	22.00 (55.9)	6.50 (16.5)	1.00 (2.5)	0.10 (0.25)	0.00 (0.00)	0.00 (0.00)	0.00 (0.00)	0.40 (1.0)	22.70 (57.7)	60.40 (153.4)	190.5 (483.85)
Average extreme snow depth inches (cm)	44 (110)	44 (110)	45 (110)	28 (71)	6 (15)	0 (0)	0 (0)	0 (0)	0 (0)	1 (2.5)	12 (30)	31 (79)	59 (150)
Average precipitation days (≥ 0.01 in)	14.5	13.2	13.9	11.7	9.1	5.7	2.3	2.4	4.4	9.4	14.0	15.5	116.1
Average snowy days (≥ 0.1 in)	9.8	9.2	8.1	4.1	0.7	0.1	0.0	0.0	0.0	0.7	5.4	10.4	48.5
Source 1: NOAA
Source 2: XMACIS2 (records, monthly max/mins & 1991-2020 snow depth)

== Recreation ==
Odell Lake offers recreational opportunities similar to nearby Crescent Lake, which is 4 miles (6.4 km) to the south. There are several developed campgrounds around Odell Lake, as well as boat ramps that allow for sailing, wind surfing, water skiing and fishing. The last two state record lake trout (mackinaw) were caught in Odell Lake; the most recent being a 40 lb 8 oz (18.4 kg) lake trout caught in 1984. Fish species found in the lake include:

- Rainbow trout
- Kokanee salmon
- Mountain whitefish
- Lake trout (mackinaw) - non-native introduced species
- Bull trout - listed as a threatened species

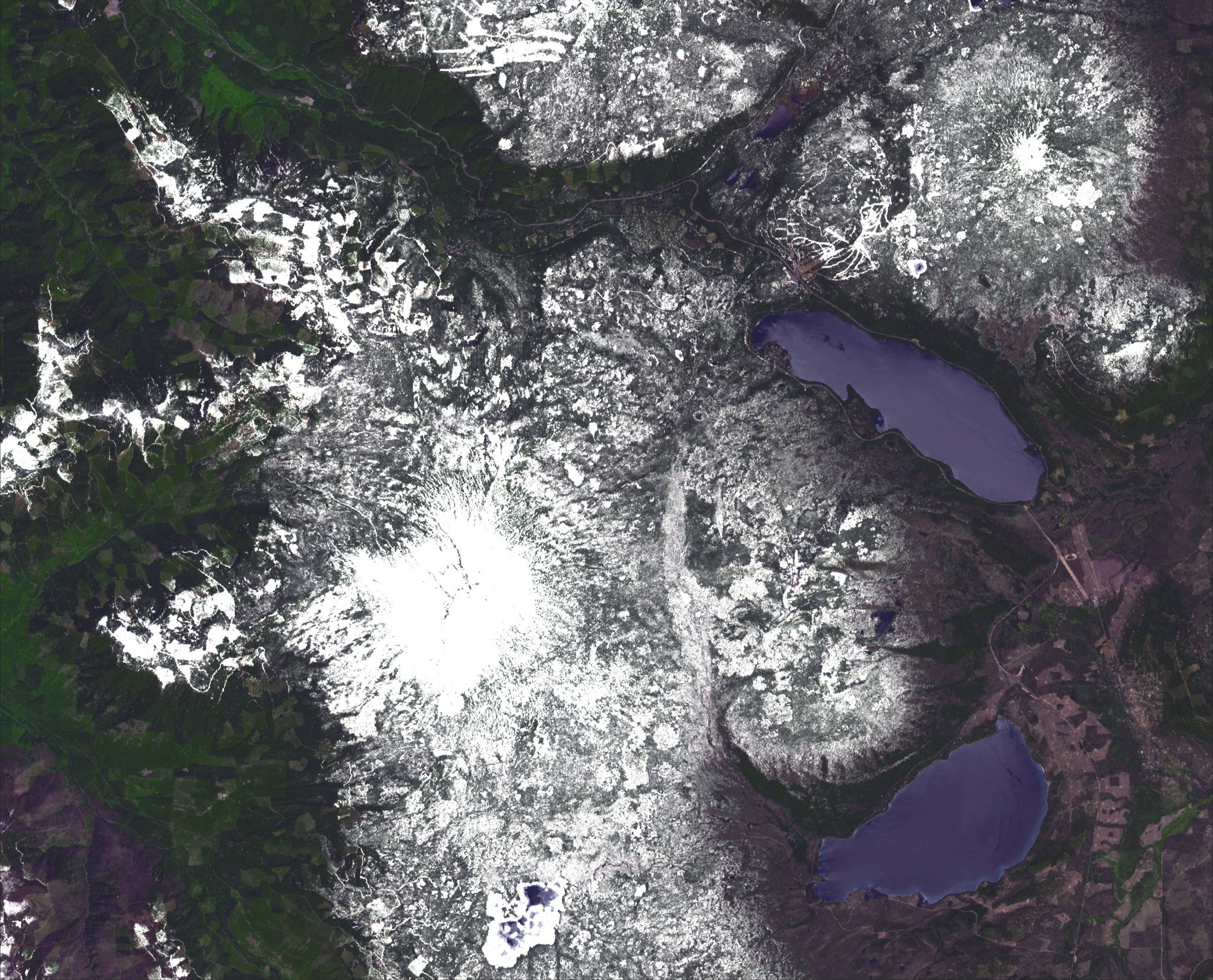
A satellite image showing Odell Lake (top right) northeast of Diamond Peak

== See also ==
- List of lakes in Oregon
- Odell Lake (video game), which takes place in this lake
