= Willamette Leadership Academy =

Willamette Leadership Academy, 6-12 grade

Location
- 34020 B St; Eugene, Lane County, Oregon 97405; United States

Information
- Type: Military
- School district: Springfield School District
- Principal: Kate Klontz
- Grades: 6-12
- Enrollment: 300
- Mascot: Knights
- Website: willametteleadershipacademy.net

Willamette Leadership Academy (WLA) is a public-charter military academy in Lane County, Oregon, United States. WLA prepares students to become leaders and to live fulfilled lives as respectful and responsible citizens.

== History and academics ==
The Willamette Leadership Academy is a 501(c)(3) non-profit organization. It is accredited through the NAAS and Oregon Dept of Education.

PYCO originally opened Willamette Leadership Academy but as of 2021, WLA is independent of PYCO. In 2012, the charter was taken up by Springfield Public Schools and all grades moved to the former Goshen Elementary building in Eugene. In 2013, grades 6–8 split off, and the newly created Battalion 2 moved into the old Mohawk Elementary building in Springfield. In 2021, both battalions merged once again into the Goshen building. WLA no longer owns the Mohawk location.

Willamette Leadership Academy currently serves multiple counties with students attending from Drain to Lebanon and Walterville to Veneta. WLA employs approximately 40 staff members.

== Leadership ==
Willamette Leadership Academy incorporates putting many students into leadership roles to boost their skills and learn leadership skills to help them out in the future. Student Leadership consists of the following roles: Squad Leader (SL), Platoon Leader (PL), Assistant Platoon Leader (APL), Guidon, student NCOs (Tan covers), and then staff.
