= Oakridge, Oregon =

- City
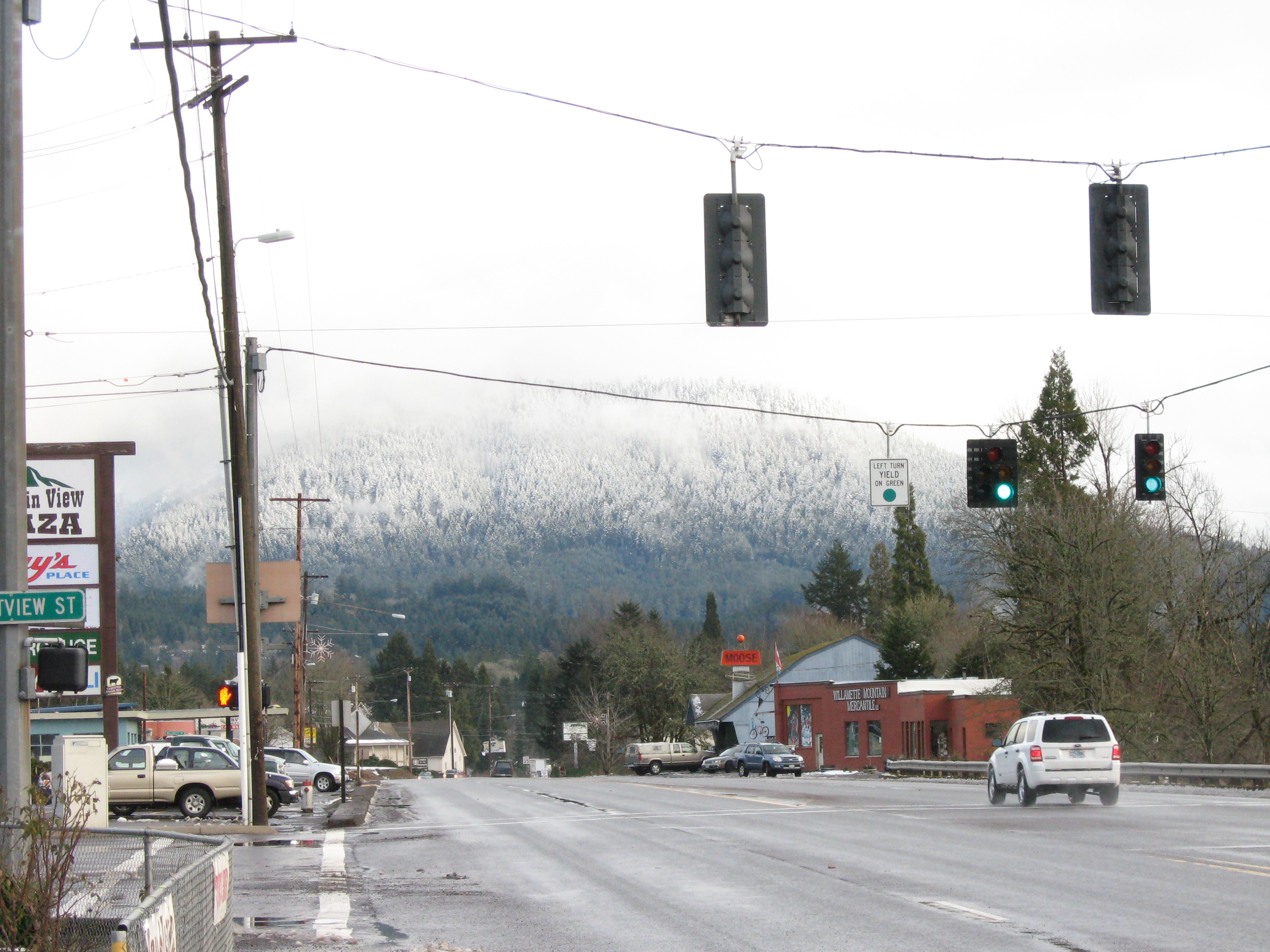
- Highway 58 in Oakridge
- Mottoes: Center of Oregon Outdoor Recreation, Mountain Biking Capital of the Northwest
- Location in Oregon
- Coordinates: 43°44′46″N 122°27′48″W
- Country: United States
- State: Oregon
- County: Lane
- Incorporated: 1912

Area
  - Total: 2.18 sq mi (5.65 km^{2})
  - Land: 2.16 sq mi (5.60 km^{2})
  - Water: 0.019 sq mi (0.05 km^{2})
- Elevation: 1,211 ft (369 m)

Population (2020)
  - Total: 3,206
  - Density: 1,483.0/sq mi (572.58/km^{2})
- Time zone: UTC-8 (Pacific)
  - Summer (DST): UTC-7 (Pacific)
- ZIP code: 97463
- Area codes: 458 and 541
- FIPS code: 41-54100
- GNIS feature ID: 2411297
- Website: www.ci.oakridge.or.us

Oakridge is a city in Lane County, Oregon, United States. The population was 3,206 as of the 2020 census. It is located east of Westfir on Oregon Route 58, about 40 miles (64 km) east of Eugene and 150 miles (240 km) southeast of Portland. Surrounded by the Willamette National Forest and the Cascade Range, Oakridge is popular with outdoor enthusiasts for its hiking, mountain biking, wildflowers, fly fishing, birding, watersports, and the nearby Willamette Pass Resort.

The city was originally a community called "Hazeldell", and its post office was established on July 26, 1888. When a station on the Southern Pacific Railroad opened in May 1912, it was named "Oak Ridge" by a railroad executive for the surrounding topography, and on July 19 of that year, the name was changed to be spelled as a single word.

The economy of Oakridge and that of nearby Westfir is centered on recreation. Since the lumber mills closed in the 1980s, the economy has been transitioning, with a new general store opening in 2010, a bakery in 2011, and a brewery and mercantile.

== History ==
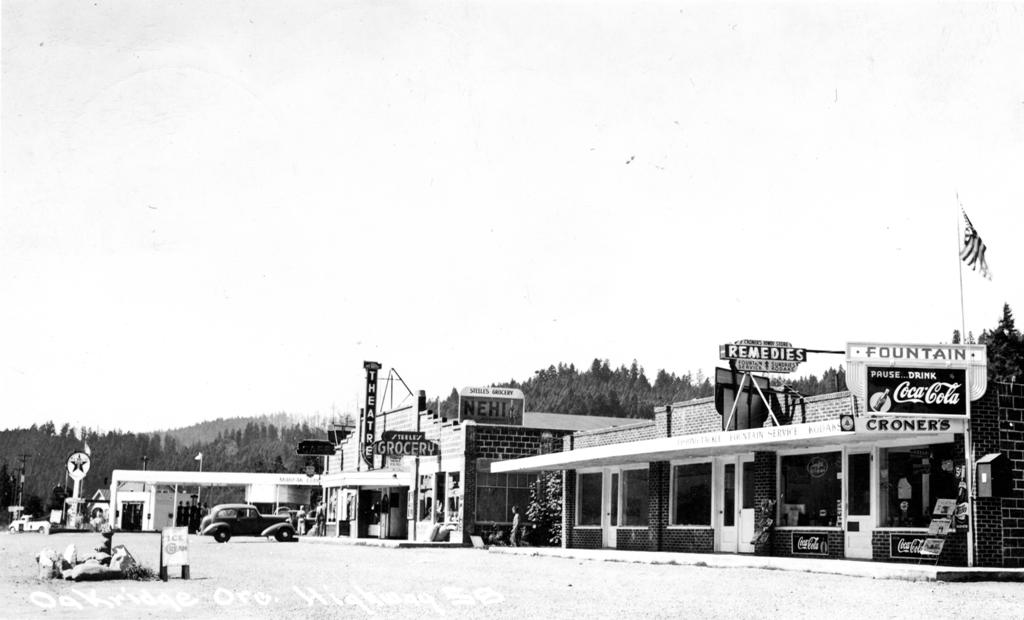
Highway 58 in Oakridge, c. 1940

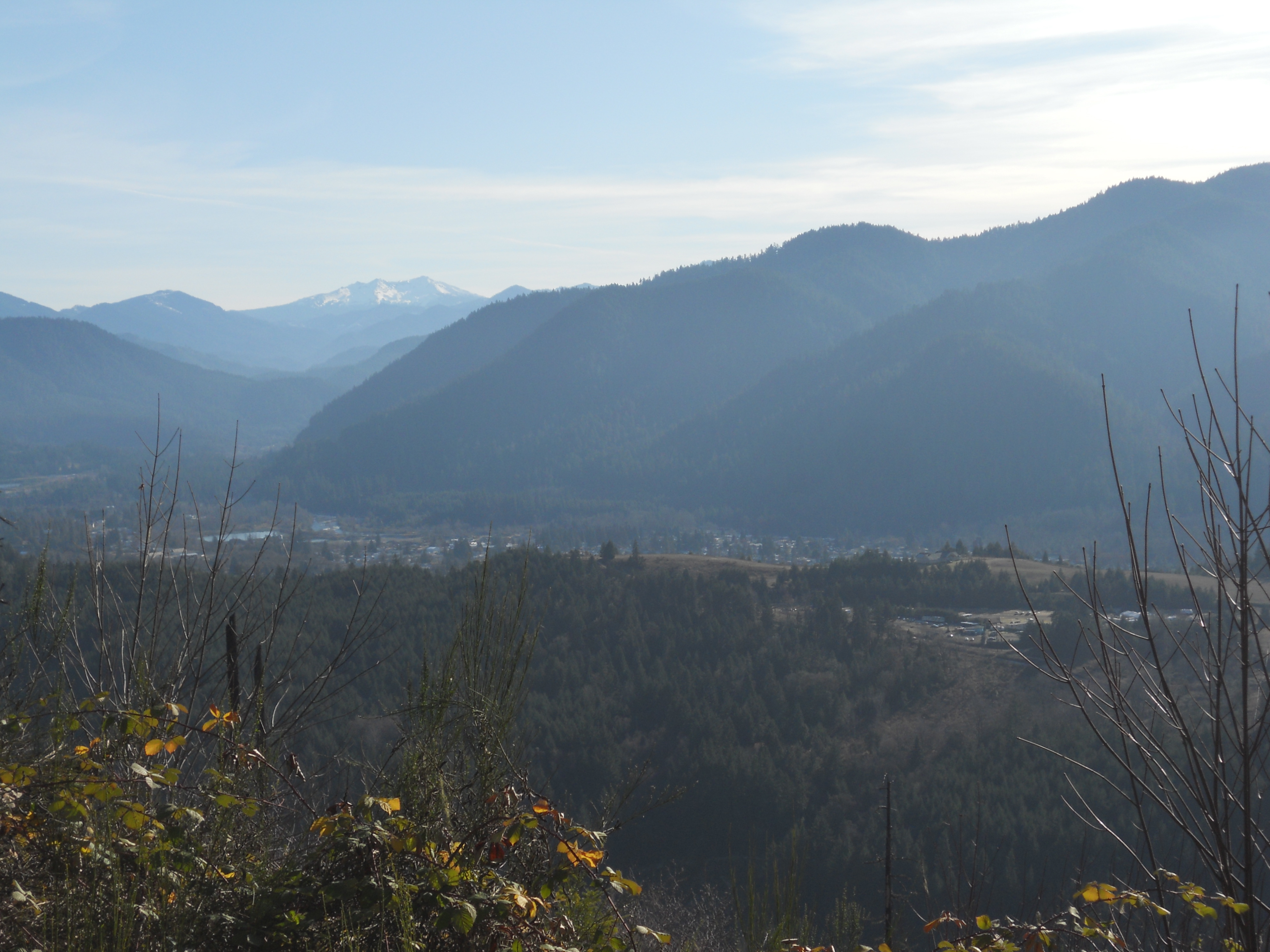
Oakridge as seen from the north, along the North Fork Trail, with snow-capped Diamond Peak in the distance

The area now known as Oakridge was first explored by Euro-Americans in 1852 as a possible route for pioneers coming from Central Oregon to the Willamette Valley. Before that Oakridge was the land of the Kalapuya who had villages on the rivers since time immemorial. A post office was named "Hazeldell" in 1888, and the place's name later changed to "Big Prairie", and then "Oak Ridge". In 1912, a new community was formed and officially named Oakridge. Since its beginnings as a mountain ranch, Oakridge has been a railroad boomtown, a loggers' haven, and an outdoor enthusiast's destination.

The early boom for Oakridge can be attributed to the Southern Pacific Railroad. By 1910, work had already begun on Tunnel 22, a short route connecting Oakridge to the area now known as Westfir. Oakridge was a station on Southern Pacific's Cascade subdivision, a line that goes over Willamette Pass via the Natron Cutoff that was built in 1926, and the railroad played an integral part of the economy and lifestyle in Oakridge. The Union Pacific Railroad still operates the rails and trains are a common sight in Oakridge. Today, Amtrak's Coast Starlight passes through the town but does not stop.

On July 2, 1946, the Pope and Talbot Lumber Company purchased timberland near Oakridge. By 1948, the company had built a large sawmill and had begun a massive timber logging operation. While the railroad and Westfir's Hines sawmill began to slow down, the Pope and Talbot mill expanded and eventually employed more than 500 people. The combined economic base of the railroad and sawmills accounted for the population growth of the 1960s and 1970s, when the community of Willamette City was consolidated into Oakridge. However, in 1978, the Hines mill in Westfir closed, and by 1985 the Pope and Talbot Mill had laid off all of its workers. The City of Oakridge now owns the property that formerly housed the Pope and Talbot sawmill.

In February 2019, an Amtrak Coast Starlight train was stranded near Oakridge for over 36 hours, after a rare heavy snowstorm.

== Geography ==
Oakridge sits at an elevation ranging from 1,200 to 1,600 feet (370 to 490 m) above sea level. According to the United States Census Bureau, the city has a total area of 2.20 square miles (5.70 km^{2}), of which 2.10 square miles (5.44 km^{2}) is land and 0.10 square miles (0.26 km^{2}) is water.

Oakridge lies in a small valley in the foothills of the Cascade Range and is completely surrounded by the Willamette National Forest. Five streams are located in and around Oakridge; they are Salmon Creek, Salt Creek, Hills Creek, and the Middle and North forks of the Willamette River, the latter of which has been designated Wild and Scenic. Diamond Peak, a shield volcano located in the nearby Diamond Peak Wilderness to the southeast, can be seen from various spots in and around Oakridge. Waldo Lake, known as one of the purest lakes in the world, and Salt Creek Falls, one of the largest waterfalls in Oregon, are located about 20 miles (32 km) east of town.

=== Climate ===
This region experiences warm and dry summers, with average monthly temperatures around 71.6 °F (22.0 °C). According to the Köppen Climate Classification system, Oakridge has a warm-summer Mediterranean climate, abbreviated Csb on climate maps. Oakridge is located below the snow line for the Cascades, making it the last stop from Eugene on Highway 58 where chains are not necessary.

Climate data for Oakridge Fish Hatchery, Oregon, 1991–2020 normals, extremes 1923–present
Month	Jan	Feb	Mar	Apr	May	Jun	Jul	Aug	Sep	Oct	Nov	Dec	Year
Record high °F (°C)	71 (22)	79 (26)	86 (30)	97 (36)	106 (41)	110 (43)	112 (44)	108 (42)	108 (42)	99 (37)	78 (26)	66 (19)	112 (44)
Mean maximum °F (°C)	53.9 (12.2)	62.8 (17.1)	72.2 (22.3)	79.7 (26.5)	86.3 (30.2)	88.4 (31.3)	93.2 (34.0)	95.3 (35.2)	92.2 (33.4)	78.1 (25.6)	61.7 (16.5)	53.5 (11.9)	97.3 (36.3)
Mean daily maximum °F (°C)	43.8 (6.6)	49.2 (9.6)	54.5 (12.5)	59.3 (15.2)	65.8 (18.8)	71.2 (21.8)	80.0 (26.7)	81.0 (27.2)	75.8 (24.3)	62.8 (17.1)	49.0 (9.4)	42.4 (5.8)	61.2 (16.2)
Daily mean °F (°C)	37.6 (3.1)	40.7 (4.8)	44.3 (6.8)	48.3 (9.1)	54.2 (12.3)	59.1 (15.1)	65.4 (18.6)	65.5 (18.6)	60.7 (15.9)	51.3 (10.7)	42.1 (5.6)	37.0 (2.8)	50.5 (10.3)
Mean daily minimum °F (°C)	31.4 (−0.3)	32.2 (0.1)	34.1 (1.2)	37.4 (3.0)	42.6 (5.9)	47.0 (8.3)	50.7 (10.4)	50.0 (10.0)	45.5 (7.5)	39.9 (4.4)	35.2 (1.8)	31.6 (−0.2)	39.8 (4.3)
Mean minimum °F (°C)	23.2 (−4.9)	24.8 (−4.0)	27.1 (−2.7)	30.1 (−1.1)	33.5 (0.8)	39.7 (4.3)	44.2 (6.8)	43.3 (6.3)	37.4 (3.0)	30.3 (−0.9)	26.5 (−3.1)	22.4 (−5.3)	19.4 (−7.0)
Record low °F (°C)	−1 (−18)	2 (−17)	18 (−8)	25 (−4)	21 (−6)	29 (−2)	33 (1)	31 (−1)	28 (−2)	20 (−7)	14 (−10)	−1 (−18)	−1 (−18)
Average precipitation inches (mm)	6.23 (158)	4.57 (116)	5.01 (127)	4.26 (108)	3.23 (82)	1.95 (50)	0.53 (13)	0.56 (14)	1.58 (40)	3.63 (92)	6.66 (169)	7.54 (192)	45.75 (1,162)
Average snowfall inches (cm)	1.3 (3.3)	1.3 (3.3)	0.6 (1.5)	0.1 (0.25)	0.0 (0.0)	0.0 (0.0)	0.0 (0.0)	0.0 (0.0)	0.0 (0.0)	0.0 (0.0)	0.3 (0.76)	1.6 (4.1)	5.2 (13)
Average precipitation days (≥ 0.01 in)	15.7	14.0	15.2	15.8	11.3	6.7	2.0	2.1	4.4	10.4	15.8	16.8	130.2
Average snowy days (≥ 0.1 in)	0.9	0.8	0.6	0.1	0.0	0.0	0.0	0.0	0.0	0.0	0.2	1.0	3.6
Source: NOAA

== Demographics ==
Historical population
Census	Pop.	Note	%±
1940	520		—
1950	1,562		200.4%
1960	1,973		26.3%
1970	3,422		73.4%
1980	3,729		9.0%
1990	3,063		−17.9%
2000	3,148		2.8%
2010	3,205		1.8%
2020	3,206		0.0%
U.S. Decennial Census

=== 2020 census ===
As of the 2020 census, Oakridge had a population of 3,206, that largest population ever recorded in Oakridge. The median age was 49.8 years. 19.0% of residents were under the age of 18 and 27.1% of residents were 65 years of age or older. For every 100 females there were 100.4 males, and for every 100 females age 18 and over there were 98.2 males age 18 and over.

0% of residents lived in urban areas, while 100.0% lived in rural areas.

There were 1,464 households in Oakridge, of which 24.3% had children under the age of 18 living in them. Of all households, 35.8% were married-couple households, 24.6% were households with a male householder and no spouse or partner present, and 30.5% were households with a female householder and no spouse or partner present. About 36.3% of all households were made up of individuals and 19.3% had someone living alone who was 65 years of age or older.

There were 1,646 housing units, of which 11.1% were vacant. Among occupied housing units, 63.7% were owner-occupied and 36.3% were renter-occupied. The homeowner vacancy rate was 2.3% and the rental vacancy rate was 9.1%.

Racial composition as of the 2020 census
Race	Number	Percent
White	2,676	83.5%
Black or African American	63	2.0%
American Indian and Alaska Native	65	2.0%
Asian	19	0.6%
Native Hawaiian and Other Pacific Islander	3	0.1%
Some other race	81	2.5%
Two or more races	299	9.3%
Hispanic or Latino (of any race)	197	6.1%

=== 2010 census ===
As of the 2010 census, there were 3,205 people (up from 3,148 people at the 2000 census), 1,437 households, and 849 families residing in the city. The population density was about 1,526 inhabitants per square mile (589.2/km^{2}). There were 1,605 housing units at an average density of about 764 per square mile (295.0/km^{2}).

There were 1,437 households, of which about 24% had children under the age of 18 living with them, about 42% were married couples living together, about 11% had a female householder with no husband present, about 6% had a male householder with no wife present, and about 41% were non-families. About 34% of all households were made up of individuals, and about 16% had someone living alone who was 65 years of age or older. The average household size was about 2.2 and the average family size was about 2.8.

The median age in the city was about 48 years. Twenty percent of residents were under the age of 18; about 7% were between the ages of 18 and 24; about 19% were from 25 to 44; 32% were from 45 to 64; and about 23% were 65 years of age or older. The gender makeup of the city was 50.2% male and 49.8% female.

== Economy ==
The town's two largest employers are the Oakridge School District and the United States Forest Service. However, in recent years there has been a cultural and economic revival centered on the outdoor recreational activities and local artists and craftspeople in the Oakridge area. Many new small businesses have opened, including a bicycle shop/ski shop/mercantile, an outdoor guide service, a microbrewery, and a bakery. The Uptown business district has formed the Uptown Business Revitalization Association (UBRA) and has worked to attract new businesses to the district. Oakridge is less than an hour from Eugene; as such, many people commute.

== Transportation ==
=== Land ===
State Highway 58, a designated freight route, serves as a major connection between Highway 97 and Interstate 5. Running east–west, Highway 58 links the Willamette Valley with Central Oregon while crossing through the Willamette National Forest and Cascade Range.

=== Rail ===
Union Pacific Railroad's main north–south line in the western two-thirds of the United States, with cargo shipping services, runs through Oakridge. Amtrak shares the rail line and provides passenger train service to nationwide destinations from Eugene.

=== Bus ===
Lane Transit District's Diamond Express runs three trips inbound and outbound on weekdays to the Eugene/Springfield area.

=== Air ===
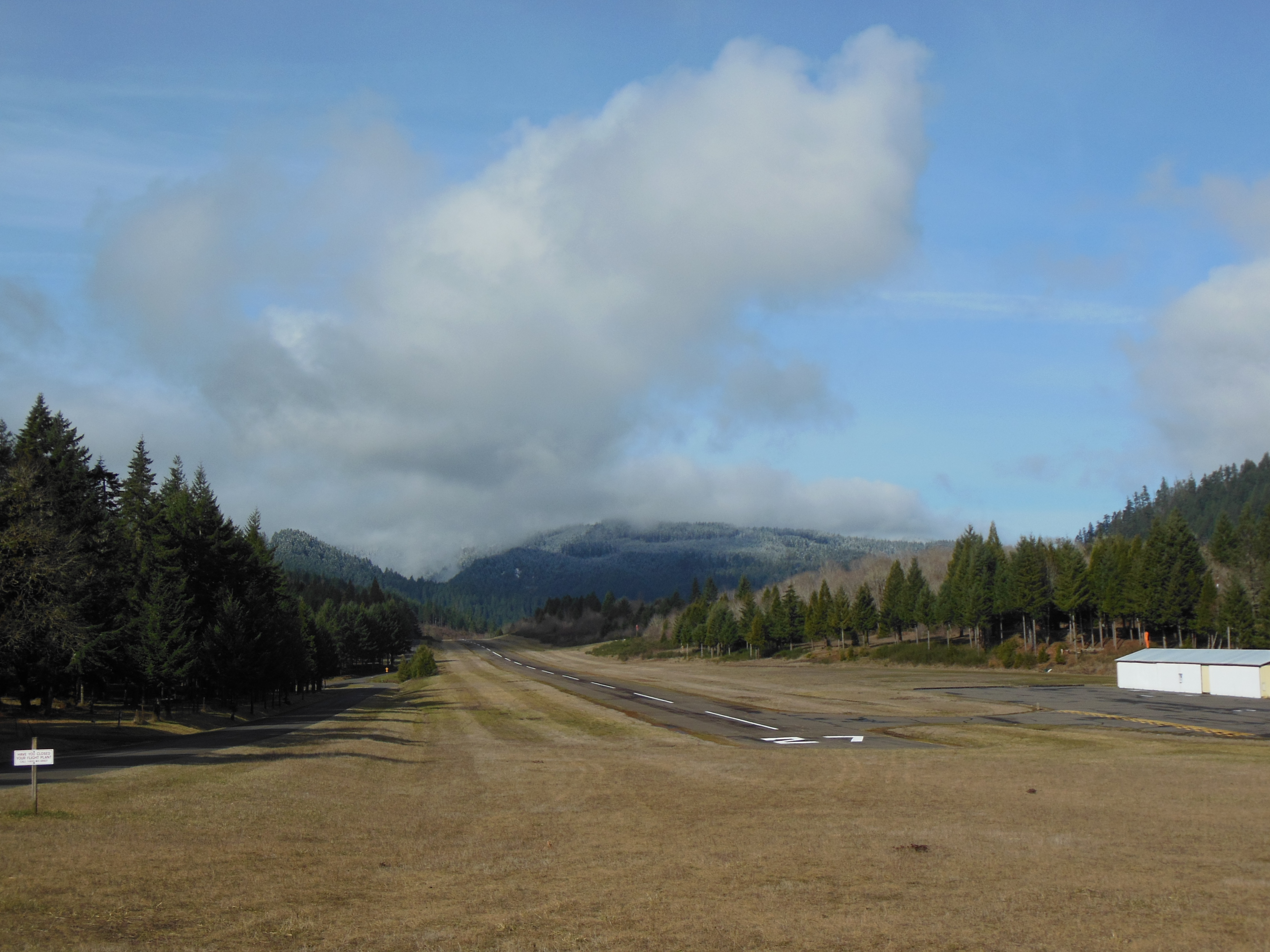
Oakridge State Airport

Oakridge State Airport is a public airport located 1 mile (1.6 km) west of Oakridge. Eugene Airport, located 45 miles (72 km) west, is the closest regional terminal providing passenger and cargo air services with access to all world markets.

=== Ports ===
The closest international shipping ports to Oakridge are the Port of Coos Bay, located 145 miles (233 km) to the west in Coos Bay, and the Port of Portland, located 149 miles (240 km) to the north in Portland.

== Education ==
The Oakridge School District consists of two schools and serves the children of Oakridge, Westfir, and outlying areas including High Prairie.

- Oakridge Elementary School - Grades K–6
- Oakridge High School - Grades 7–12

In 2008, Oakridge High School was recognized as one of the best high schools in America by U.S. News & World Report.

The University of Oregon and Lane Community College are located 40 miles (64 km) to the west.

The Oakridge Public Library was built at 48318 E. First St., next to the city hall, in 2012. It was paid for with a federal grant of $800,000 and replaced a smaller library that had been located in the city hall building.

== Notable people ==
- Tony Corcoran, represented Oakridge in the Oregon Legislature
- Laddie Gale, American basketball player
- Mason Williams, composer, "Classical Gas"
- Maximo Yabes, Medal of Honor recipient
