= Willamette Pass =

Mountain pass in Oregon

- Interactive map of Willamette Pass
- Elevation: 5,128 feet (1,563 m)
- Traversed by: OR 58

Third Approach
- Location: Klamath / Lane counties, Oregon, U.S.
- Range: Cascades
- Coordinates: 43°36′01″N 122°02′17″W

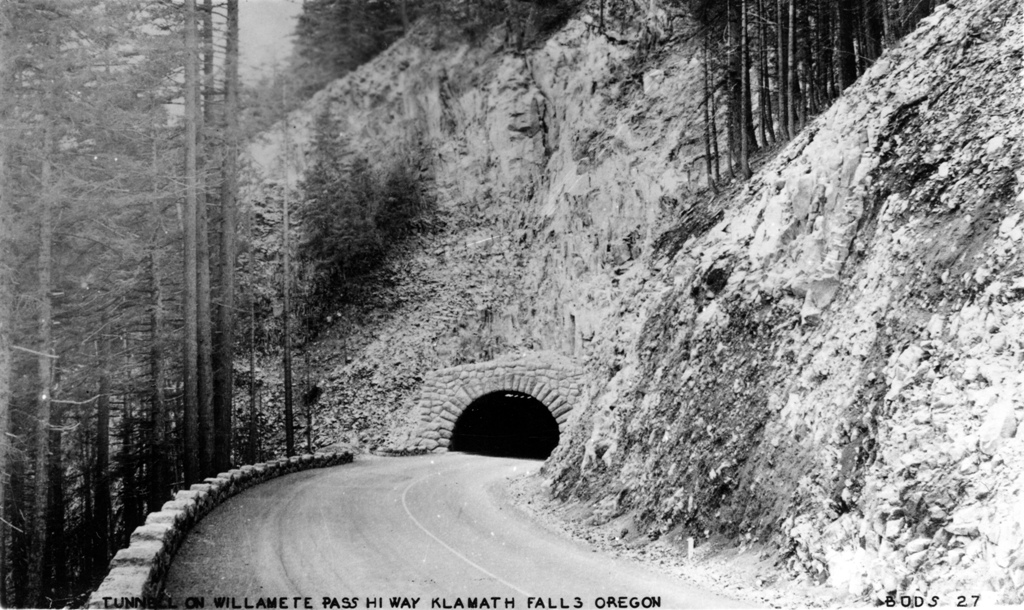
Willamette Pass Tunnel in 1940

Willamette Pass (5,128 ft or 1,563 m) is a mountain pass crossing the crest of the Cascade Range in Oregon, United States. It is less commonly known as Willamette Summit. The pass is traversed by Oregon Route 58 and by Union Pacific's (ex-Southern Pacific) Cascade Subdivision, which provides rail access between Portland, Oregon, and California. Amtrak's Coast Starlight uses this route on its way between Seattle, Portland, and Los Angeles. The Willamette Pass Resort ski area is located above the pass.

== Climate ==
Climate data for Santiam Pass, Oregon
Month	Jan	Feb	Mar	Apr	May	Jun	Jul	Aug	Sep	Oct	Nov	Dec	Year
Record high °F (°C)	61 (16)	60 (16)	69 (21)	76 (24)	84 (29)	91 (33)	93 (34)	97 (36)	93 (34)	84 (29)	71 (22)	59 (15)	107 (42)
Mean maximum °F (°C)	44 (7)	46 (8)	56 (13)	66 (19)	75 (24)	83 (28)	90 (32)	87 (31)	79 (26)	69 (21)	55 (13)	47 (8)	92 (33)
Mean daily maximum °F (°C)	34.2 (1.2)	36.7 (2.6)	41.7 (5.4)	49.0 (9.4)	57.7 (14.3)	64.2 (17.9)	75.5 (24.2)	74.2 (23.4)	64.6 (18.1)	54.0 (12.2)	42.8 (6.0)	36.8 (2.7)	52.6 (11.4)
Daily mean °F (°C)	28.3 (−2.1)	30.5 (−0.8)	33.9 (1.1)	39.0 (3.9)	45.9 (7.7)	51.5 (10.8)	59.5 (15.3)	58.3 (14.6)	51.6 (10.9)	44.2 (6.8)	34.9 (1.6)	31.1 (−0.5)	42.4 (5.8)
Mean daily minimum °F (°C)	21.1 (−6.1)	22.5 (−5.3)	25.4 (−3.7)	28.9 (−1.7)	33.8 (1.0)	38.5 (3.6)	43.5 (6.4)	42.9 (6.1)	38.6 (3.7)	34.3 (1.3)	28.0 (−2.2)	24.0 (−4.4)	31.8 (−0.1)
Mean minimum °F (°C)	4 (−16)	6 (−14)	12 (−11)	17 (−8)	25 (−4)	29 (−2)	33 (1)	33 (1)	29 (−2)	23 (−5)	15 (−9)	9 (−13)	3 (−16)
Record low °F (°C)	−19 (−28)	−16 (−27)	−7 (−22)	6 (−14)	10 (−12)	21 (−6)	27 (−3)	27 (−3)	20 (−7)	4 (−16)	0 (−18)	−10 (−23)	−26 (−32)
Average precipitation inches (mm)	9.72 (247)	6.21 (158)	6.51 (165)	3.51 (89)	2.85 (72)	2.10 (53)	0.50 (13)	0.85 (22)	1.92 (49)	5.12 (130)	7.88 (200)	9.89 (251)	57.06 (1,449)
Average snowfall inches (cm)	59.4 (151)	61.6 (156)	57.6 (146)	39.0 (99)	13.0 (33)	0.2 (0.51)	0.0 (0.0)	0.0 (0.0)	0.6 (1.5)	13.4 (34)	36.0 (91)	73.1 (186)	353.9 (898.01)
