= Willamette Riverkeeper =

Non profit organization in Oregon, US

- Abbreviation: WRK
- Named after: The original Hudson Riverkeeper in New York.
- Formation: February 1996; 30 years ago
- Founder: Joe Coffman (founding Board member), Rita Haberman (Executive Director, 1996-2000)
- Legal status: Nonprofit
- Headquarters: 454 Willamette St. #218, Eugene, OR 97401
- Region served: Willamette Valley, Oregon, US
- Co-Executive Director: Michelle Emmons, Co-Executive Director and Upper Willamette Riverkeeper Heather King, Co-Executive Director and Lower Willamette Riverkeeper
- Board of directors: Cathy Tortorici (President), Jessie Rohrig (Secretary), Tamara Madsen (Tresurer), Steve Hernandez, Mark Taratoot, Rosemary Furfey, Jordan Horrell, Sandy Cutler, Maleek McKenzie
- Affiliations: Waterkeeper Alliance
- Website: https://willamette-riverkeeper.org/
- Formerly called: Friends of the Willamette River

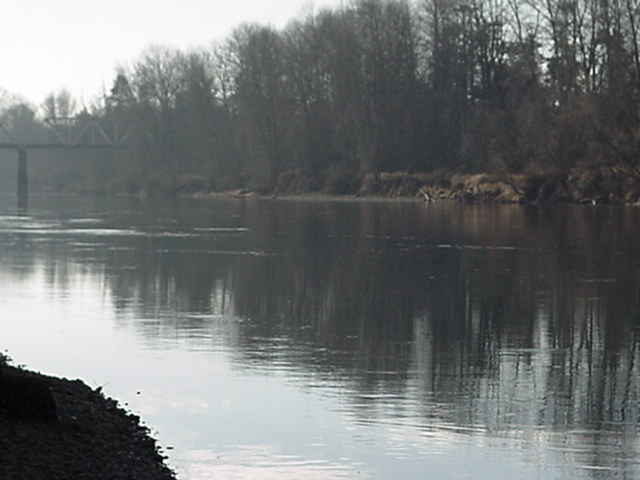
Willamette River

Willamette Riverkeeper is a non profit organization formed in 1996 in order to protect and restore the water quality and natural habitat of the Willamette River. WR was the 13th Riverkeeper organization formed after the original Hudson Riverkeeper. Today there are over 300 Riverkeeper, Baykeeper, and Coastkeeper organizations in the United States and internationally. Each organization is independent, but subscribes first and foremost to enforcing the Clean Water Act, or related international laws.

== Willamette River ==
The Willamette River runs through a large stretch of Oregon's Willamette Valley and is more than 187 miles long, with the main stem river stretching from south of Eugene to Portland, Oregon. The Willamette River is impacted by numerous issues, including water pollution, toxic pollutants, and dams on the river's tributaries to urban development and industrial waste. In addition to pollution, the floodplain of the Willamette River has been degraded to a significant extent.

== Overview ==
Willamette Riverkeeper is the only non-profit organization that works solely to protect and restore the Willamette River's water quality and habitat. Over the years they have advocated, educated, and worked in a hands-on manner to improve conditions along the Willamette - with the support of many members of the general public. From their work on Superfund in Portland Harbor since 1995, to their advocacy for the Willamette Greenway, they have moved the Willamette River's health forward in a way that no other organization, funder, or government entity has.

== History ==
Michelle Emmons and Heather King became over co-leaders of the organization in March, 2025. Bob Sallinger led the organization from June 2024 – October 2024, as Riverkeeper and executive director until his death in October, 2024. He was preceded by Travis Williams, who had led the organization since 2000. The Willamette Riverkeeper team has made efforts to enforce the Clean Water Act, improve fish passage at the dams on tributaries of the Willamette River with the goal of restoring naturally reproducing populations of Spring Chinook and Winter Steelhead to the river system and to restore habitat. In 2007, Willamette Riverkeeper filed a lawsuit against the US Army Corps of Engineers (Corps) that forced the Corps to complete the Biological Opinion of the Willamette, and to begin work to reduce their impact on fish populations. This legal action by Willamette Riverkeeper resulted in a settlement completed in 2008 that forced the US Army Corps and the Bonneville Power Administration to take steps to improve fish passage and restore habitat.

The organization has also been responsible for bringing thousands of people to the river to canoe, kayak, paddle board, and swim over the years. Their work on the Willamette Water Trail has drawn thousands to the Willamette. Their signature event, Paddle Oregon, brings hundreds of people to the river every August to canoe, kayak and paddle board. Each day participants learn about the river and its needs.

In 2009, Willamette Riverkeeper reinvigorated the Willamette River Greenway Program by the Oregon Parks and Recreation Department. This effort sought to improve public understanding and stewardship of thousands of acres of public land along the Willamette River. Over the next several years, Willamette Riverkeeper was involved in protecting and expanding Greenway lands.

In January 2017, after 16 years of work, the Portland Harbor Superfund site's Record of Decision was completed, providing a template for how best to remove or separate contaminated sediments from the river bottom. Willamette Riverkeeper worked to hold accountable the responsible parties and push them to take action in regard to the Cleanup, and to support the US Environmental Protection Agency (EPA) in completing the Record of Decision. Finally, after much opposition from some of the Potentially Responsible Parties, the Record of Decision was finished. The Record of Decision provided additional sediment removal over the Draft Plan issued by the EPA in June 2016. Willamette Riverkeeper has been the primary non profit organization that worked to analyze the technical aspects of the cleanup, educate the general public about the issue, and since 1996 had taken thousands of people on the river to see it and learn about its issues.

Willamette Riverkeeper has also purchased land along the Willamette and the S. Santiam River in order to protect its ecological value, and to provide low-impact camping opportunities along the river. This is part of the Willamette Water Trail. www.willamettewatertrail.org. The organization owns land in Lane, Benton, Marion, and Yamhill Counties.

== Staff ==
=== Team Members ===
Seven members are listed:

- Michelle Emmons, Co-Executive Director and Upper Willamette Riverkeeper
- Heather King, Co-Executive Director and Lower Willamette Riverkeeper
- Lindsey Hutchinson, Staff Attorney
- Lee Belowski, Recreation Associate
- Luke Stuntz, Upper Willamette Outreach and Recreation Coordinator
- Jake Hastings, Restoration Associate
- Brian Armstrong, Restoration Associate

=== Board of Directors ===
Nine Board members are listed:

- Cathy Tortorici, President
- Tamara Madsen, Treasurer
- Jessie Rohrig, Secretary
- Steve Hernandez
- Mark Taratoot
- Rosemary Furfey
- Jodan Horrell
- Sandy Cutler
- Malek McKenzie

=== Advisory Board ===
The Willamette Riverkeeper Advisory Board is in a reorganization process.

== See also ==
- Riverkeeper
- Oregon Water Resources Department
- Water quality law
