= Willamette River =

River in northwest Oregon, US

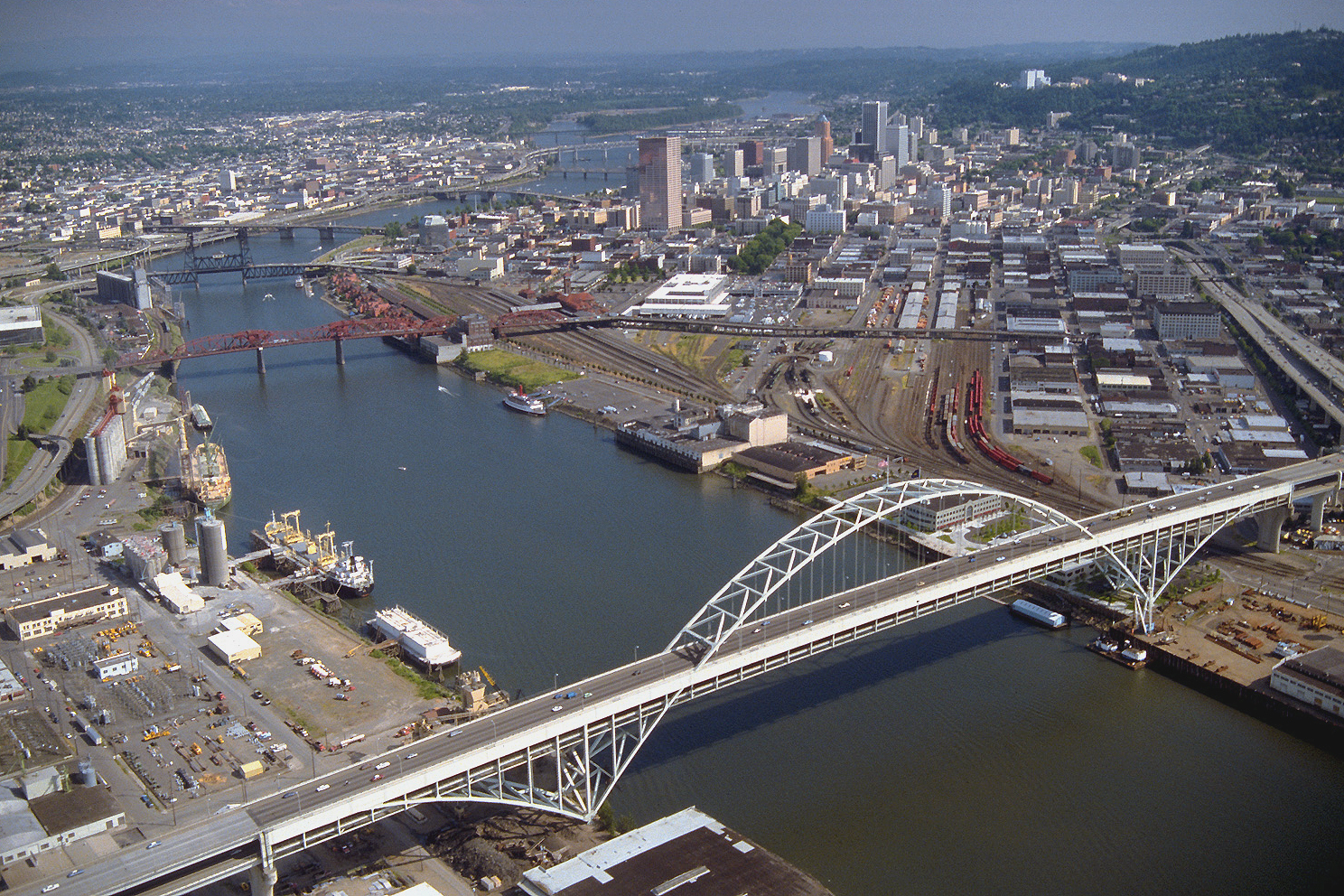
- The Willamette passing through Downtown Portland in the 1980s

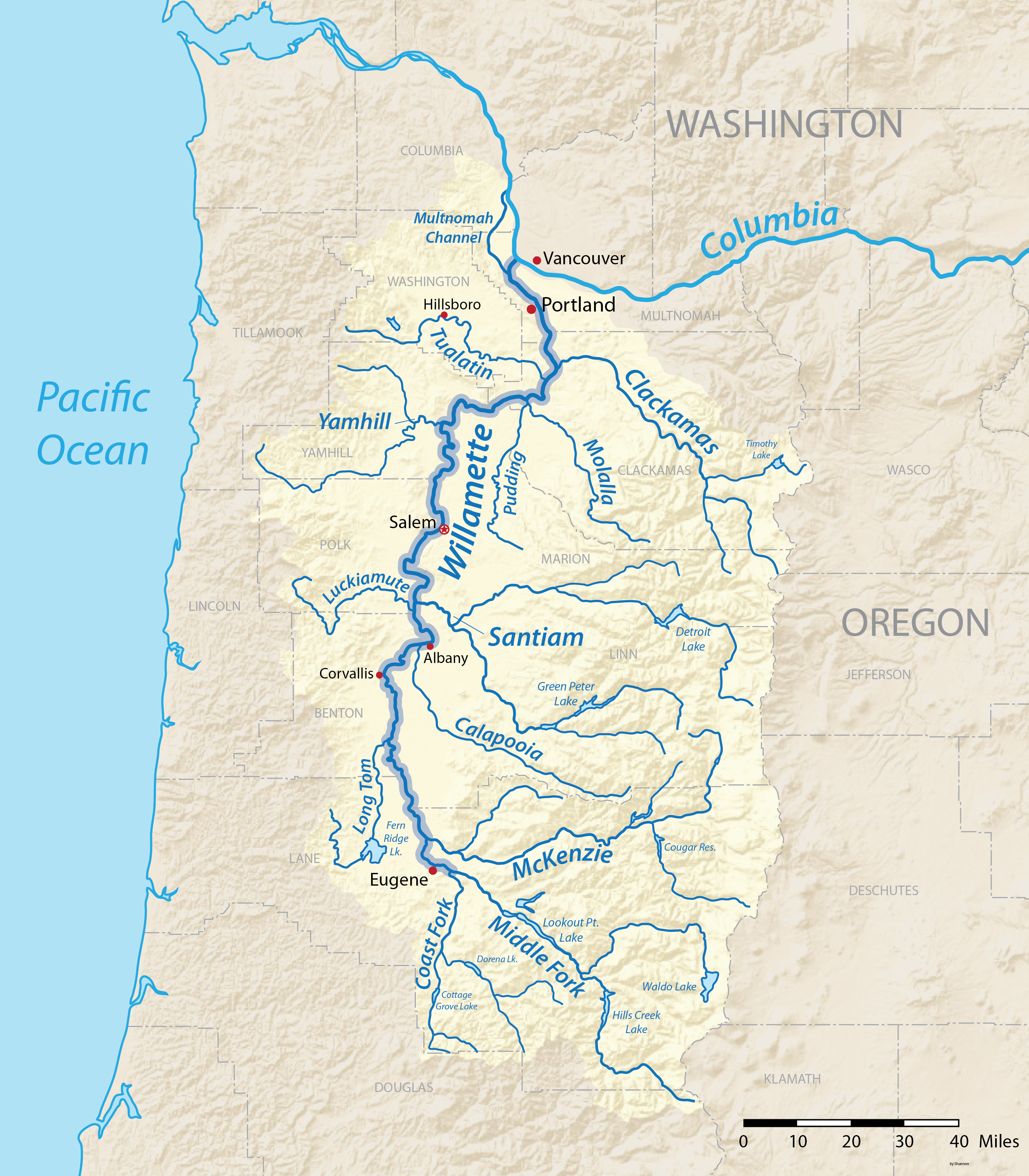
- A map of the Willamette River, its drainage basin, major tributaries and major cities
- Etymology: From a Clackamas Native American village name

Location
- Country: United States
- State: Oregon
- Cities: Eugene, Corvallis, Albany, Independence, Salem, Newberg, Wilsonville, Portland

Physical characteristics
- Source: Confluence of Middle Fork Willamette River and Coast Fork Willamette River
  - location: near Eugene, Oregon
  - coordinates: 44°01′23″N 123°01′25″W
  - elevation: 438 ft (134 m)
- Mouth: Columbia River
  - location: Portland, Oregon
  - coordinates: 45°39′10″N 122°45′53″W
  - elevation: 10 ft (3.0 m)
- Length: 187 mi (301 km)
- Basin size: 11,478 sq mi (29,730 km^{2})
- Discharge
  - location: Morrison Bridge, Portland, 12.8 miles (20.6 km) from mouth
  - average: 33,010 cu ft/s (935 m^{3}/s)
  - minimum: 4,200 cu ft/s (120 m^{3}/s)
  - maximum: 420,000 cu ft/s (12,000 m^{3}/s)

Basin features
- Tributaries
  - left: Coast Fork Willamette River, Long Tom River, Marys River, Luckiamute River, Yamhill River, Tualatin River
  - right: Middle Fork Willamette River, McKenzie River, Calapooia River, Santiam River, Molalla River, Clackamas River

The Willamette River (/wɪˈlæmɪt/ wi-LAM-it) is a major tributary of the Columbia River, accounting for 12 to 15 percent of the Columbia's flow. The Willamette's main stem is 187 miles (301 km) long, lying entirely in northwestern Oregon in the United States. Flowing northward between the Oregon Coast Range and the Cascade Range, the river and its tributaries form the Willamette Valley, a basin that contains two-thirds of Oregon's population, including the state capital, Salem, and the state's largest city, Portland, which surrounds the Willamette's mouth at the Columbia.

Originally created by plate tectonics about 35 million years ago and subsequently altered by volcanism and erosion, the river's drainage basin was significantly modified by the Missoula Floods at the end of the most recent ice age. Humans began living in the watershed over 10,000 years ago. There were once many tribal villages along the lower river and in the area around its mouth on the Columbia. Indigenous peoples lived throughout the upper reaches of the basin as well.

Rich with sediments deposited by flooding and fed by prolific rainfall on the western side of the Cascades, the Willamette Valley is one of the most fertile agricultural regions in North America, and it was thus the destination of many 19th-century pioneers traveling west along the Oregon Trail. The river was an important transportation route in the 19th century, although Willamette Falls, just upstream from Portland, was a major barrier to boat traffic. In the 21st century, major highways follow the river, and roads cross the main stem on approximately 30 different bridges. Five bridges not open to motorized vehicles provide separate crossings for bicycles and pedestrians, all in the Eugene area, and eight are exclusively for rail traffic. There are also ferries that convey cars, trucks, motorcycles, bicycles, and pedestrians across the river for a fare and provided river conditions permit. They are the Buena Vista Ferry between Marion County and Polk County south of Independence and Salem, the Wheatland Ferry between Marion County and Polk County north of Salem and Keizer, and Canby Ferry in Clackamas County north of Canby.

Since 1900, more than 15 large dams and many smaller ones have been built in the Willamette's drainage basin, 13 of which are operated by the U.S. Army Corps of Engineers (USACE). The dams are used primarily to produce hydroelectricity, to maintain reservoirs for recreation, and to prevent flooding. The river and its tributaries support 60 fish species, including many species of salmon and trout; this is despite the dams, other alterations, and pollution (especially on the river's lower reaches). Part of the Willamette Floodplain was established as a National Natural Landmark in 1987, and the river was named as one of 14 American Heritage Rivers in 1998.

== Course ==
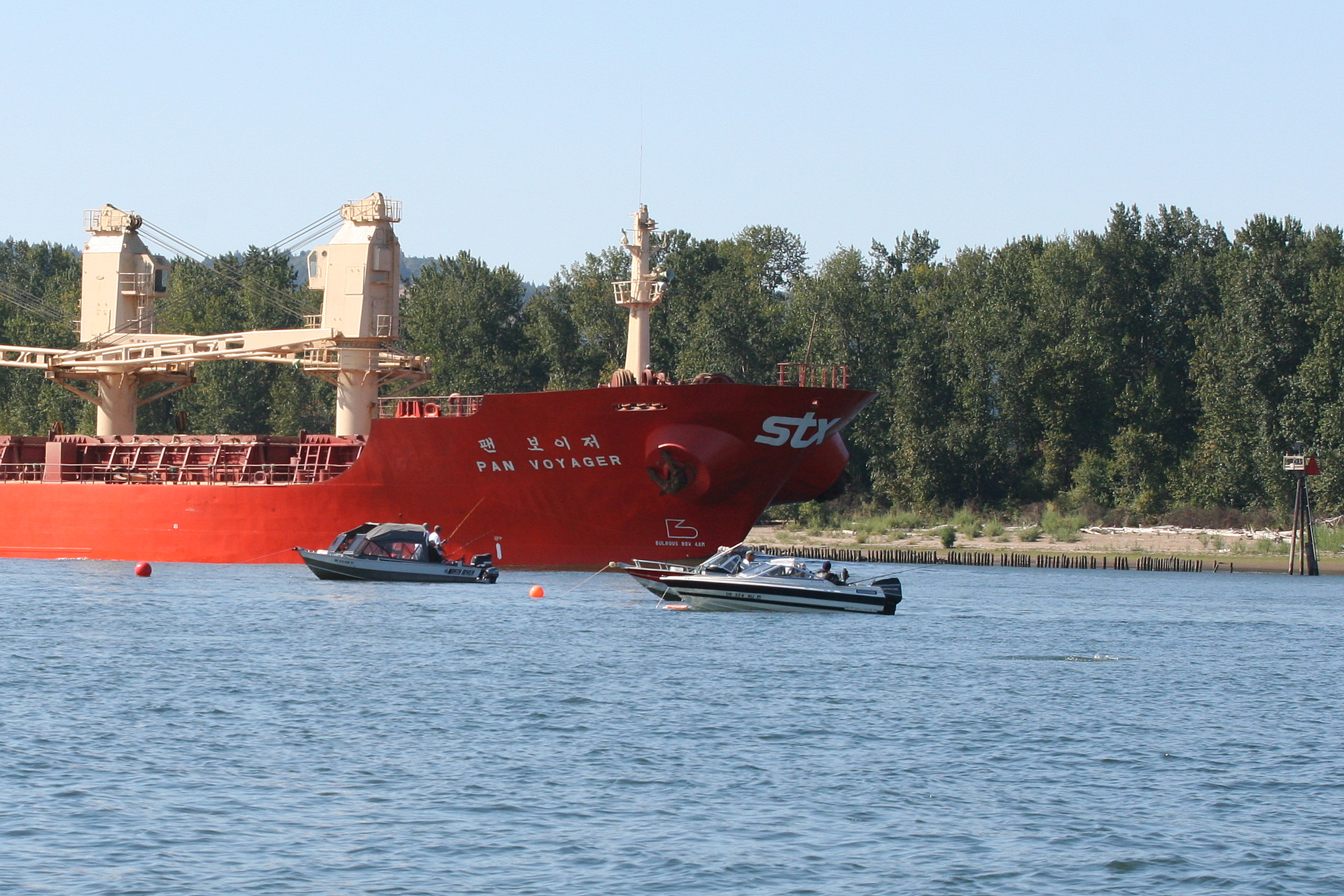
Ocean-going cargo ship anchored at the mouth of the Willamette

The upper tributaries of the Willamette originate in the mountains south and southeast of Eugene, Oregon. Formed by the confluence of the Middle Fork Willamette River and the Coast Fork Willamette River near Springfield, the main stem Willamette meanders generally north for 187 miles (301 km) to the Columbia River. The river's two most significant course deviations occur at Newberg, where it turns sharply east, and Canby, where it turns north again. Near its mouth north of downtown Portland, the river splits into two channels that flow around Sauvie Island, both of which are navigable and maintained by the United States Army Corps of Engineers. The main channel, the primary navigational conduit for Portland's harbor and riverside industrial areas, is 40 feet (12 m) deep and varies in width from 600 to 1,900 feet (180 to 580 m), although the river broadens to 2,000 feet (610 m) in some of its lower reaches. This channel enters the Columbia about 101 miles (163 km) from the Columbia's mouth on the Pacific Ocean. The smaller Multnomah Channel, a distributary, is 21 miles (34 km) long, about 600 feet (180 m) wide, and 40 feet (12 m) deep. It ends about 14.5 miles (23.3 km) farther downstream on the Columbia, near St. Helens in Columbia County.

Proposals have been made for deepening the Multnomah Channel to 43 feet (13 m) in conjunction with roughly 103.5 miles (166.6 km) of tandem-maintained navigation on the Columbia River. Between the 1850s and the 1960s, channel-straightening and flood control projects, as well as agricultural and urban encroachment, cut the length of the river between the McKenzie River confluence and Harrisburg by 65 percent. The river was also shortened by 40 percent in the stretch between Harrisburg and Albany.

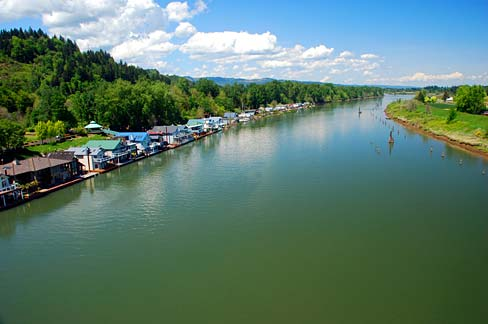
The Multnomah Channel from the Sauvie Island Bridge

Interstate 5 and three branches of Oregon Route 99 are the two major highways that follow the river for its entire length. Communities along the main stem include Springfield and Eugene in Lane County; Harrisburg in Linn County; Corvallis in Benton County; Albany in Linn and Benton counties; Independence in Polk County; Salem in Marion County; Newberg in Yamhill County; Oregon City, West Linn, Milwaukie, and Lake Oswego in Clackamas County; and Portland in Multnomah and Washington counties. Significant tributaries from source to mouth include the Middle and Coast forks and the McKenzie, Long Tom, Marys, Calapooia, Santiam, Luckiamute, Yamhill, Molalla, Tualatin, and Clackamas rivers.

Beginning at 438 feet (134 m) above sea level, the main stem descends 428 feet (130 m) between source and mouth, or about 2.3 feet per mile (0.4 m per km). The gradient is slightly steeper from the source to Albany than it is from Albany to Oregon City. At Willamette Falls, between West Linn and Oregon City, the river plunges about 40 feet (12 m). For the rest of its course, the river is extremely low-gradient and is affected by Pacific Ocean tidal effects from the Columbia. The main stem of the Willamette varies in width from about 330 to 660 feet (100 to 200 m).

=== Discharge ===
With an average flow at the mouth of about 37,400 cubic feet per second (1,060 m^{3}/s), the Willamette ranks 19th in volume among rivers in the United States and contributes 12 to 15 percent of the total flow of the Columbia River. The Willamette's flow varies considerably season to season, averaging about 8,200 cubic feet per second (230 m^{3}/s) in August to more than 79,000 cubic feet per second (2,200 m^{3}/s) in December.

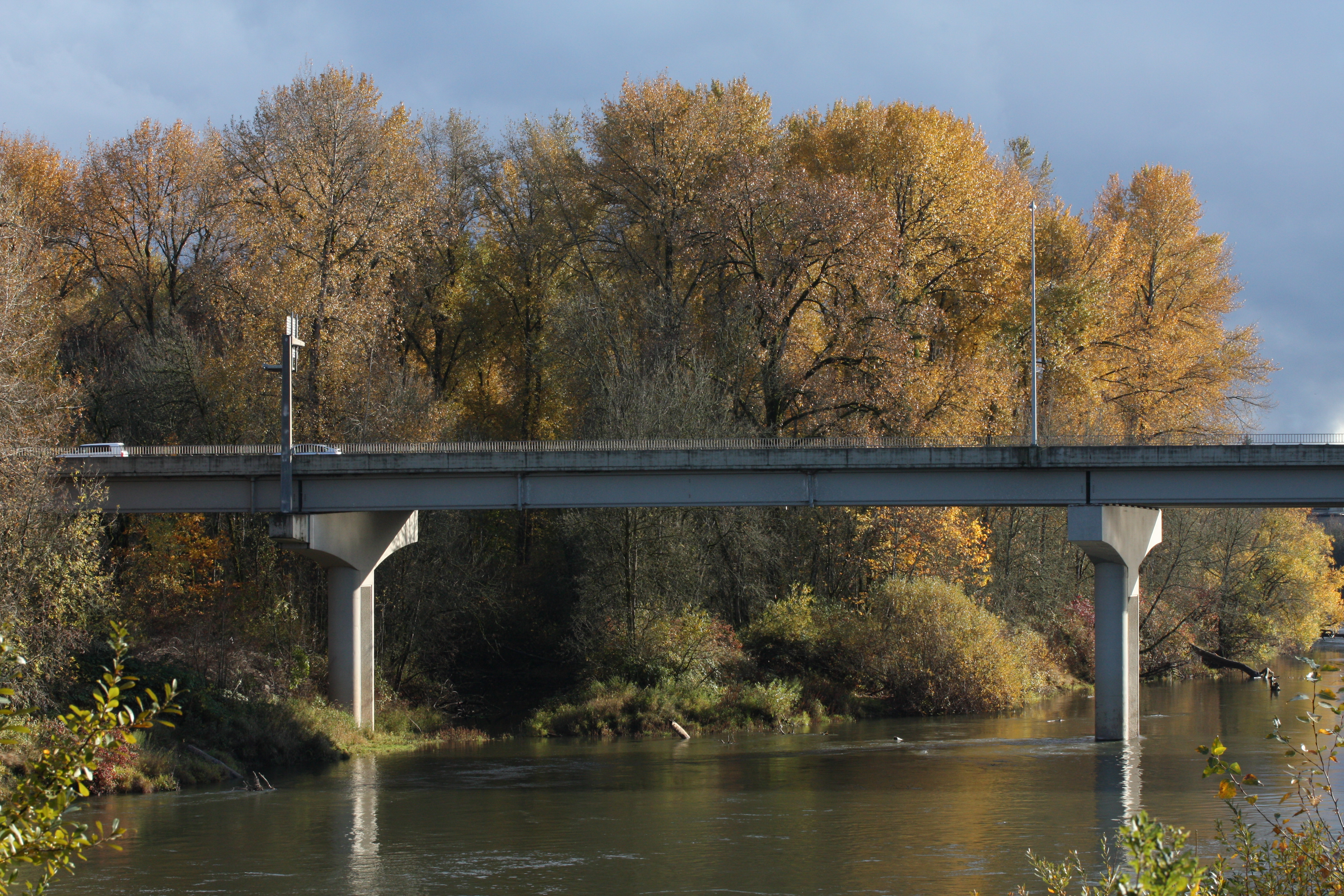
The Oregon Route 34 bridge across the Willamette River at Corvallis is a mid-valley highway crossing.

The U.S. Geological Survey (USGS) operates five stream gauges along the river, at Harrisburg, Corvallis, Albany, Salem, and Portland. The average discharge at the lowermost gauge, near the Morrison Bridge in Portland, was 33,220 cubic feet per second (941 m^{3}/s) between 1972 and 2013. Located at river mile (RM) 12.8 or river kilometer (RK) 20.6, the gauge measures the flow from an area of 11,200 square miles (29,000 km^{2}), roughly 97 percent of the Willamette basin. The highest flow recorded at this station was 420,000 cubic feet per second (11,893 m^{3}/s) on February 9, 1996, during the Willamette Valley Flood of 1996, and the minimum was 4,200 cubic feet per second (120 m^{3}/s) on July 10, 1978. The highest recorded flow of 635,000 cubic feet per second (18,000 m^{3}/s) for the Willamette at a different gauge in Portland occurred during a flood in 1861. This and many other large flows preceded the Flood Control Act of 1936 and dam construction on the Willamette's major tributaries.

The river below Willamette Falls, 26.5 miles (42.6 km) from the mouth, is affected by semidiurnal tides, and gauges have detected reverse flows (backwards river flows) below Ross Island at RM 15 (RK 24). The National Weather Service issues tide forecasts for the river at the Morrison Bridge.

== Geology ==
The Willamette River basin was created primarily by plate tectonics and volcanism and was altered by erosion and sedimentation, including deposits from enormous glacial floods as recent as 13,000 years ago. The oldest rocks beneath the Willamette Valley are the Siletz River Volcanics. About 35 million years ago, these rocks were subducted by the Farallon Plate beneath the North American Plate, creating the forearc basin that would later become the Willamette Valley. The valley was initially part of the continental shelf, rather than a separate inland sea. Many layers of marine deposits formed in the forearc basin and cover the older Siletz River Volcanics. About 20 to 16 million years ago, uplift formed the Coast Range and separated the basin from the Pacific Ocean.

Basalts of the Columbia River Basalt Group, from eruptions primarily in eastern Oregon, flowed across large parts of the northern half of the basin about 15 million years ago. They covered the Tualatin Mountains (West Hills), most of the Tualatin Valley, and the slopes of hills farther south, with up to 1,000 feet (300 m) of lava. Later deposits covered the basalt with up to 1,000 feet (300 m) of silt in the Portland and Tualatin basins. During the Pleistocene, beginning roughly 2.5 million years ago, volcanic activity in the Cascades combined with a cool, moist climate to produce further heavy sedimentation across the basin, and braided rivers created alluvial fans spreading down from the east.

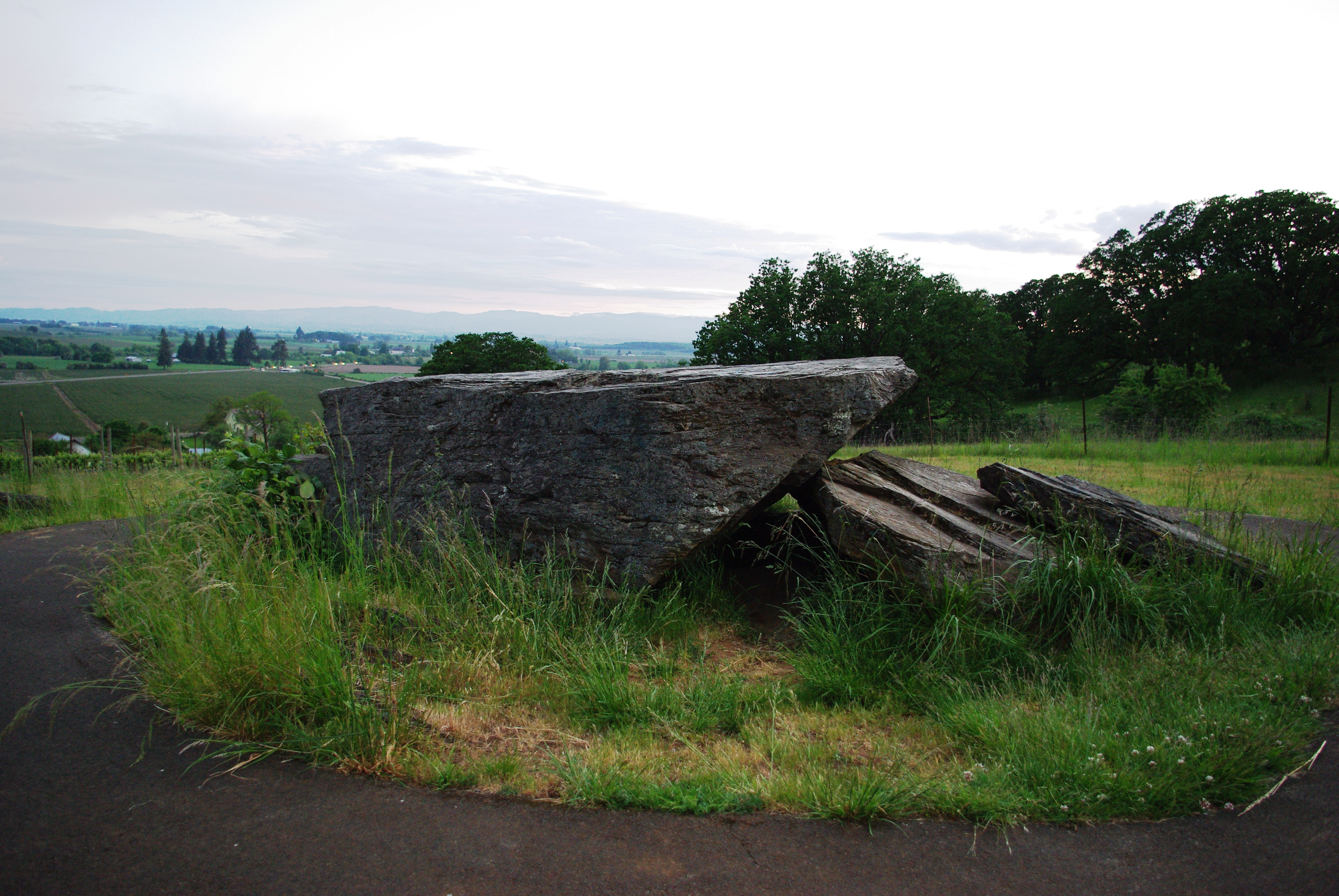
The glacial Bellevue Erratic at Erratic Rock State Natural Site. The rock was transported to the Willamette Valley by the Missoula Floods.

Between about 15,500 and 13,000 years ago, the Missoula Floods—a series of large outpourings originating at Glacial Lake Missoula in Montana—swept down the Columbia River and backfilled the Willamette watershed. Each flood produced "discharges that exceeded the annual discharge of all the present-day rivers of the world combined". Filling the Willamette basin to depths of 400 feet (120 m) in the Portland region, each flood created a temporary lake, Lake Allison, that stretched from Lake Oswego to near Eugene. The ancestral Tualatin Valley, part of the Willamette basin, flooded as well; water depths ranged from 200 feet (61 m) at Lake Oswego to 100 feet (30 m) as far upstream (west) as Forest Grove. Flood deposits of silt and clay, ranging in thickness from 115 feet (35 m) in the north to about 15 feet (4.6 m) in the south, settled from this muddy water to form today's valley floor. The floods carried Montana icebergs well into the basin, where they melted and dropped glacial erratics onto the land surface. These rocks, composed of granite and other materials common to central Montana but not to the Willamette Valley, include more than 40 boulders, each at least 3 feet (0.9 m) in diameter. Before being partly chipped away and removed, the largest of these originally weighed about 160 short tons (150 t).

The northern part of the watershed is underlain by a network of faults capable of producing earthquakes at any time, and many small quakes have been recorded in the basin since the mid-19th century. In 1993, the Scotts Mills earthquake—the largest recent earthquake in the valley, measuring 5.6 on the Richter scale—was centered near Scotts Mills, about 34 miles (55 km) south of Portland. It caused $30 million in damage, including harm to the Oregon State Capitol in Salem. Evidence suggests that massive quakes of 8 or more on the Richter scale have occurred historically in the Cascadia subduction zone off the Oregon coast, most recently in 1700 CE, and that others as strong as 9 on the Richter scale occur every 500 to 800 years. The basin's high population density, its nearness to this subduction zone, and its loose soils, which tend to amplify shaking, make the Willamette Valley especially vulnerable to damage from strong earthquakes.

== Watershed ==
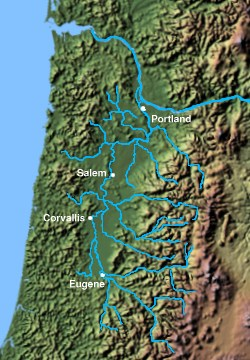
Willamette Valley map showing main stem and major tributaries

The Willamette River drains a region of 11,478 square miles (29,730 km^{2}), which is 12 percent of the total area of Oregon. Bounded by the Coast Range to the west and the Cascade Range to the east, the river basin is about 180 miles (290 km) long and 100 miles (160 km) wide. Elevations within the watershed range from 10,495 feet (3,199 m) at Mount Jefferson in the Cascade Range to 10 feet (3.0 m) at the mouth on the Columbia River. Watersheds bordering the Willamette River basin are those of the Little Deschutes River to the southeast, the Deschutes River to the east, and the Sandy River to the northeast; the North Umpqua and Umpqua rivers to the south; coastal rivers including (from south to north) the Siuslaw, the Alsea, the Yaquina, the Siletz, the Nestucca, the Trask, and the Wilson to the west; the Nehalem and the Clatskanie to the northwest, and the Columbia River to the north.

About 2.5 million people lived in the Willamette River basin as of 2010, about 65 percent of the population of Oregon. As of 2009, the basin contained 20 of the 25 most populous cities in Oregon. These cities include Springfield, Eugene, Corvallis, Albany, Salem, Keizer, Newberg, Oregon City, West Linn, Milwaukie, Lake Oswego, and Portland. The largest is Portland, with more than 500,000 residents. Not all of these cities draw water in part or exclusively from the Willamette for their municipal water supply. Other cities in the watershed (but not on the main-stem river) with populations of 20,000 or more are Gresham, Hillsboro, Beaverton, Tigard, McMinnville, Tualatin, Woodburn, and Forest Grove.

Sixty-four percent of the watershed is privately owned, while 36 percent is publicly owned. The U.S. Forest Service manages 30 percent of the watershed, the U.S. Bureau of Land Management 5 percent, and the State of Oregon 1 percent. Sixty-eight percent of the watershed is forested; agriculture, concentrated in the Willamette Valley, makes up 19 percent, and urban areas cover 5 percent. More than 81,000 miles (130,000 km) of roads criss-cross the watershed.

In 1987, the U.S. Secretary of the Interior designated 713 acres (289 ha) of the watershed in Benton County as a National Natural Landmark. This area is the Willamette Floodplain, the largest remaining unplowed native grassland in the North Pacific geologic province, which encompasses most of the Pacific Northwest coast.

== History ==
=== First inhabitants ===
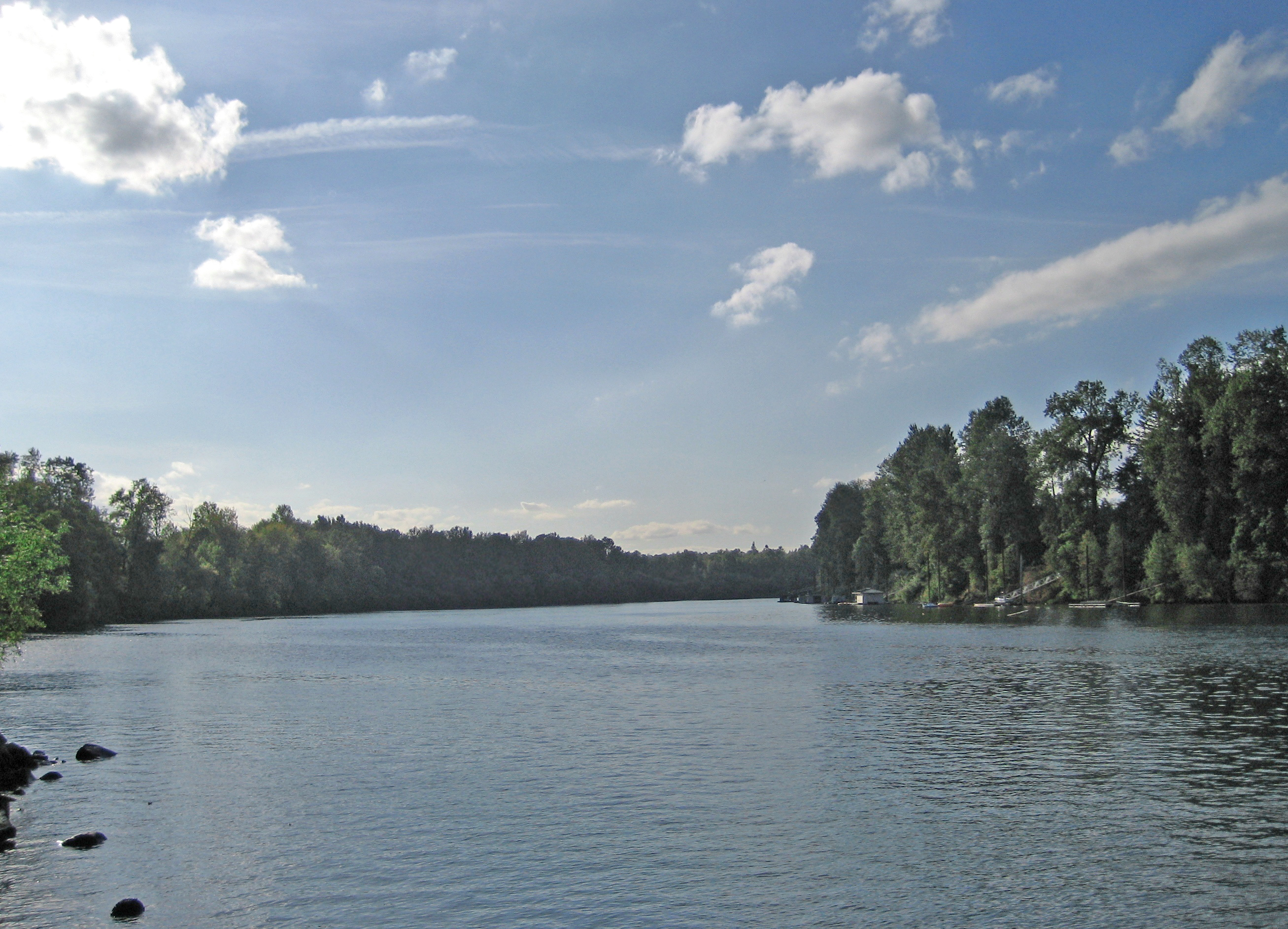
The Willamette River near the confluence with the Molalla River

For at least 10,000 years, a variety of indigenous peoples populated the Willamette Valley. These included the Kalapuya, the Chinook, and the Clackamas. The territory of the Clackamas encompassed the northeastern portion of the basin, including the Clackamas River (with which their name is shared). Although it is unclear exactly when, the territory of the Chinook once extended across the northern part of the watershed, through the Columbia River valley. Indigenous peoples of the Willamette Valley were further divided into groups including the Kalapuyan-speaking Yamhill and Atfalati (Tualatin) (both Northern Kalapuya), Central Kalapuya like the Santiam, Muddy Creek (Chemapho), Long Tom (Chelamela), Calapooia (Tsankupi), Marys River (Chepenafa) and Luckiamute, and the Yoncalla or Southern Kalapuya, as well other tribes such as the Chuchsney-Tufti, Siuslaw and Molala. The name Willamette is of Indigenous origin, perhaps deriving from the French pronunciation of the name of a Clackamas village. The name may also be derived from Kalapuya.

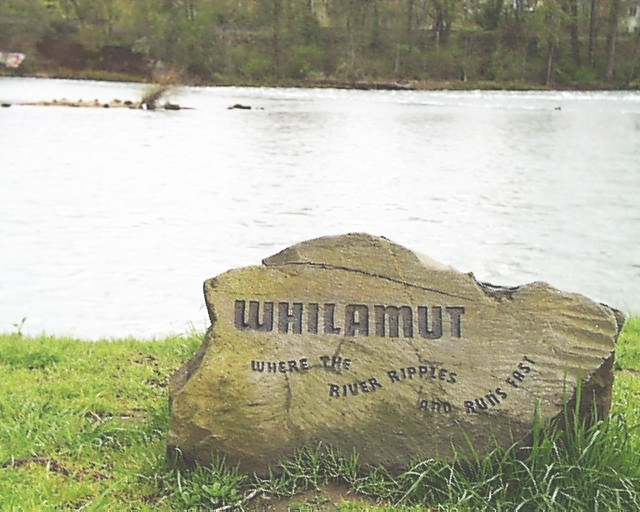
A boulder at Alton Baker Park in Eugene engraved with the Kalapuyan word "Whilamut" "Where the river ripples and runs fast"

Around the year 1850, the Kalapuya numbered between 2,000 and 3,000 and were distributed among several groups. These figures are only speculative; there may have been as few as eight subgroups or as many as 16. In that time period, the Clackamas' tribal population was roughly 1,800. The U.S. Census Bureau estimated that the Chinook population was nearly 5,000, though not all of the Chinook lived on the Willamette. The Chinook territory encompassed the lower Columbia River valley and significant stretches of the Pacific coast on both the north and the south side of the Columbia's mouth. At times, however, the Chinook territory extended even farther south in the Willamette Valley. The total native population was estimated at 15,000.

The indigenous peoples of the Willamette River practiced a variety of life ways. Those on the lower river, slightly closer to the coast, often relied on fishing as their primary economic mainstay. Salmon was the most important fish to Willamette River tribes as well as to the Native Americans of the Columbia River, where white traders traded fish with the Native Americans. Upper-river tribes caught steelhead and salmon, often by building weirs across tributary streams. Tribes of the northern Willamette Valley practiced a generally settled lifestyle. The Chinooks lived in great wooden lodges, practiced slavery, and had a well-defined caste system. People of the south were more nomadic, traveling from place to place with the seasons. They were known for the controlled burning of woodlands to create meadows for hunting and plant gathering (especially camas).

=== 18th century ===
The Willamette River first appeared in written records in 1792, when it was observed by British Lieutenant William Robert Broughton of the Vancouver Expedition, led by George Vancouver.

=== 19th century ===
The 1805–1806 Lewis and Clark Expedition originally missed the mouth of the Willamette. On their return journey, only after receiving directions from natives along the Sandy River did the explorers learn about their oversight. William Clark returned down the Columbia and entered the Willamette River in April 1806.

Fur trappers originally working for the Pacific Fur Company and subsequently for the North West Company were next to visit the Willamette River and various tributaries. In 1812, William Henry and Alfred Seton paddled up from Fort Astoria on the Columbia River into the mouth of the Willamette, continued to a portage at Willamette Falls, and finished their journey at the later site of Champoeg. A first trading post was established. By early 1813, William Wallace and John C. Halsey established a second outpost, Wallace House, farther south, north of present-day Salem.

By the end of the War of 1812, the North West Company acquired the Pacific Fur Company. Free trappers Registre Bellaire, John Day and Alexander Carson hunted and traded furs during the winter of 1813–14 along the Willamette. About thirty North West Company employees were stationed at the Champoeg post, now called the Willamette Trading Post, along with freemen housed in two huts and Kalapuya nearby. Nez Perce and Cayuse warned the North West Company to stay out of the Willamette Valley hunting grounds. Skirmishes went on for several years over fishing and hunting grounds contended by several groups. In 1829 Étienne Lucier established a land claim and settled near the Champoeg trading post, soon joined by Joseph Gervais (1831), Pierre Belleque (1833) and 77 French-Canadian settlers by 1836. By 1843, approximately 100 newcomer families lived in the vicinity of the Willamette on a section referred to as French Prairie.

By the winter of 1818–19, Thomas McKay led a hunting brigade south along the Willamette River and reached the upper Umpqua River. More violent skirmishes were fought. Most brigade members returned to Fort George (the former Fort Astoria). Louis LaBonté, Joseph Gervais, Étienne Lucier, Louis Kanota, and Louis Pichette (dit DuPré) remained in the Willamette Valley as free trappers. Meanwhile, in 1821 the NWC merged with the Hudson's Bay Company (HBC). In 1825 a new Fort Vancouver headquarters was built on the north shore of the Columbia closer to the Willamette, and Fort George was closed.

The Siskiyou Trail (or California-Oregon Trail), developed from a network of Indigenous routes, became a route for Euro-American fur traders along the Willamette Valley beginning with Alexander Roderick McLeod in the 1820s, who traveled from Fort Vancouver to the Sacramento Valley in California. By 1841, members of the United States Exploring Expedition encountered the Siskiyou Trail. They noted extensive salmon fishing by natives at Willamette Falls, much like that at Celilo Falls on the Columbia River.

In the middle part of the 19th century, the Willamette Valley's fertile soils, pleasant climate, and abundant water attracted thousands of settlers from the eastern United States, mainly the Upland South borderlands of Missouri, Iowa, and the Ohio Valley. Many of these emigrants followed the Oregon Trail, a 2,170-mile (3,490 km) trail across western North America that began at Independence, Missouri, and ended at various locations near the mouth of the Willamette River. Although people had been traveling to Oregon since 1836, large-scale migration did not begin until 1843, when nearly 1,000 pioneers headed westward. Over the next 25 years, some 500,000 settlers traveled the Oregon Trail to reach the Willamette Valley.

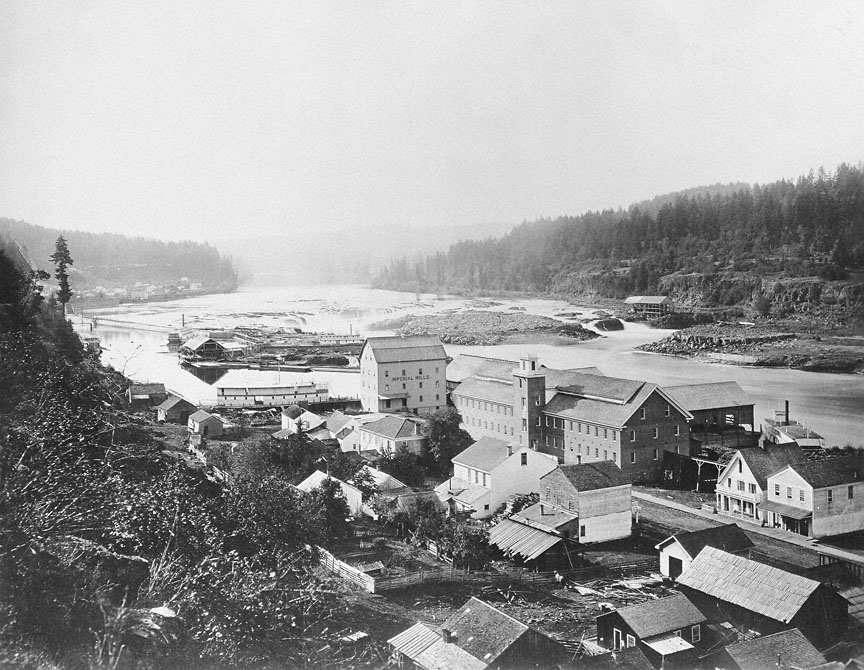
Oregon City circa 1867, with Willamette Falls in the background

Starting in the 1830s, Oregon City developed near Willamette Falls, and Linn City (originally Robins Nest) was established across the Willamette from Oregon City. Oregon City was incorporated in 1844, becoming the first city west of the Rocky Mountains to have that distinction. John McLoughlin, the Hudson's Bay Company (HBC) superintendent of the Columbia District, contributed to the founding of the town in 1829. McLoughlin attempted to persuade the HBC (which still held sway over the area) to allow American settlers to live on the land and provided significant help to American colonization of the area, all against the HBC's orders. Oregon City prospered because of the lumber and grist mills that were run by the water power of Willamette Falls, but the falls formed an impassable barrier to river navigation.

After Portland was incorporated in 1851, quickly growing into Oregon's largest city, Oregon City gradually lost its importance as the economic and political center of the Willamette Valley. Beginning in the 1850s, steamboats began to ply the Willamette, despite the fact that they could not pass Willamette Falls. As a result, navigation on the Willamette River was divided in two: the 27-mile (43 km) lower reach between Oregon City and Portland—connected to the rest of the Columbia River system—and an upper reach above Willamette Falls. Any boats whose owners found it absolutely necessary to get past the falls had to be portaged. This led to competition for business among steam portage companies. In 1873, the construction of the Willamette Falls Locks bypassed the falls and allowed easy navigation between the upper and lower river. Each lock chamber measured 210 feet (64 m) long and 40 feet (12 m) wide, and the canal was originally operated manually before it switched to electrical power. Usage of the locks peaked in the 1940s, and by the early 21st century, the lock system was little used. Since 2011, the Willamette Falls Locks have been inactive.

As commerce and industry flourished on the lower river, most of the original settlers acquired farms in the upper Willamette Valley. By the late 1850s, farmers had begun to grow crops on most of the available fertile land. The settlers increasingly encroached on Native American lands. Skirmishes between natives and settlers in the Umpqua and Rogue valleys to the southwest of the Willamette River led the Oregon state government to remove the natives by military force. They were first led off their traditional lands to the Willamette Valley, but soon were marched to the Coast Indian Reservation. In 1855, Joel Palmer, an Oregon legislator, negotiated a treaty with the Willamette Valley tribes, who, although unhappy with the treaty, ceded their lands to non-natives. The natives were then relocated by the government to a part of the Coast Reservation that later became the Grand Ronde Reservation.

Between 1879 and 1885, the Willamette River was charted by Cleveland S. Rockwell, a topographical engineer and cartographer for the United States Coast and Geodetic Survey. Rockwell surveyed the lower Willamette from the foot of Ross Island through Portland to the Columbia River and then downstream on the Columbia to Bachelor Island. Rockwell's survey was extremely detailed, including 17,782 hydrographic soundings. His work helped open the port of Portland to commerce.

In the second half of the 19th century, the USACE dredged channels and built locks and levees in the Willamette's watershed. Although products such as lumber were often transported on an existing network of railroads in Oregon, these advances in navigation helped businesses deliver more goods to Portland, feeding the city's growing economy. Trade goods from the Columbia basin north of Portland could also be transported southward on the Willamette due to the deeper channels made at the Willamette's mouth.

=== 20th and 21st centuries ===
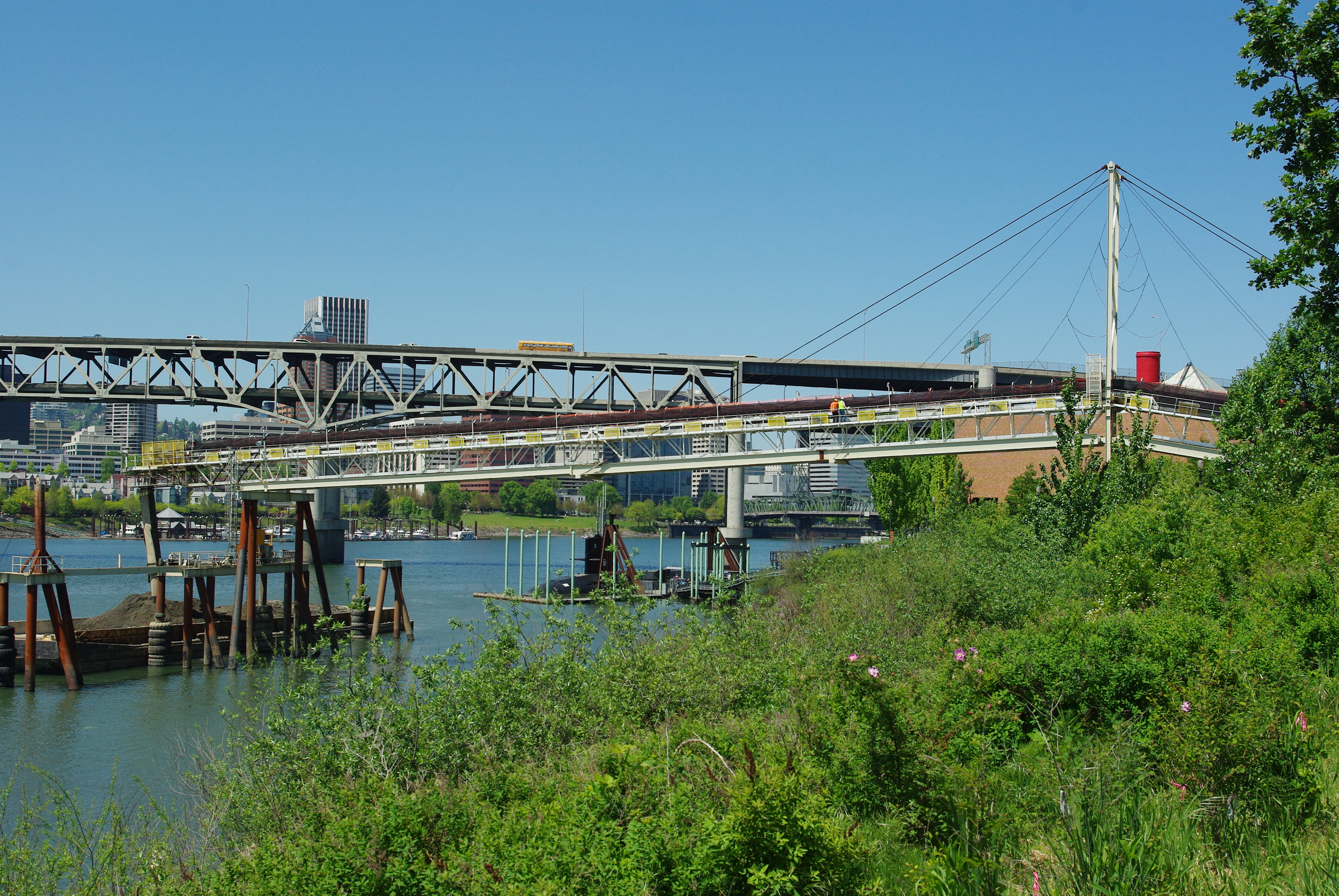
Conveyor belt loading debris onto a barge as part of the Big Pipe Project

By the early 20th century, major river-control projects had begun to take place. Levees were constructed along the river in most urban areas, and Portland built concrete walls to protect its downtown sector. In the following decades, many large dams were built on Cascade Range tributaries of the Willamette. The Army Corps of Engineers operates 13 such dams, which affect flows from about 40 percent of the basin. Most of them do not have fish ladders.

With development in and near the river came increased pollution. By the late 1930s, efforts to stem the pollution led to formation of a state sanitary board to oversee modest cleanup efforts. In the 1960s, Oregon Governor Tom McCall led a push for stronger pollution controls on the Willamette. In this, he was encouraged by Robert (Bob) Straub—the state treasurer and future Oregon governor (1975)—who first proposed a Willamette Greenway program during his 1966 gubernatorial campaign against McCall. The Oregon State Legislature established the program in 1967. Through it, state and local governments cooperated in creating or improving a system of parks, trails, and wildlife refuges along the river. In 1998, the Willamette became one of 14 rivers designated an American Heritage River by U.S. President Bill Clinton. By 2007 the Greenway had grown to include more than 170 separate land parcels, including 10 state parks. Public uses of the river and land along its shores include camping, swimming, fishing, boating, hiking, bicycling, and wildlife viewing.

In 2008, government agencies and the non-profit Willamette Riverkeeper organization designated the full length of the river as the Willamette River Water Trail. Four years later, the National Park Service added the Willamette water trail—expanded to 217 miles (349 km) to include some of the major tributaries—to its list of National Water Trails. The water trail system is meant to protect and restore waterways in the United States and enhance recreation on and near them.

A 1991 agreement between the City of Portland and the State of Oregon to dramatically reduce combined sewer overflows (CSOs) led to Portland's Big Pipe Project. The project, part of a related series of Portland CSO projects completed in late 2011 at a cost of $1.44 billion, separates the city's sanitary sewer lines from storm-water inputs that sometimes overwhelmed the combined system during heavy rains. When that occurred, some of the raw sewage in the system flowed into the river instead of into the city's wastewater treatment plant. The Big Pipe project and related work reduces CSO volume on the lower river by about 94 percent.

In June 2014, Dean Hall became the first person to swim the entire length of the Willamette River. He swam 184 miles (296 km) from Eugene to the river mouth in 25 days.

In 2017, Human Access Project partnered with Portland Parks & Recreation to open the city's first officially recognized public swimming beach, Poet's Beach.

== Dams ==
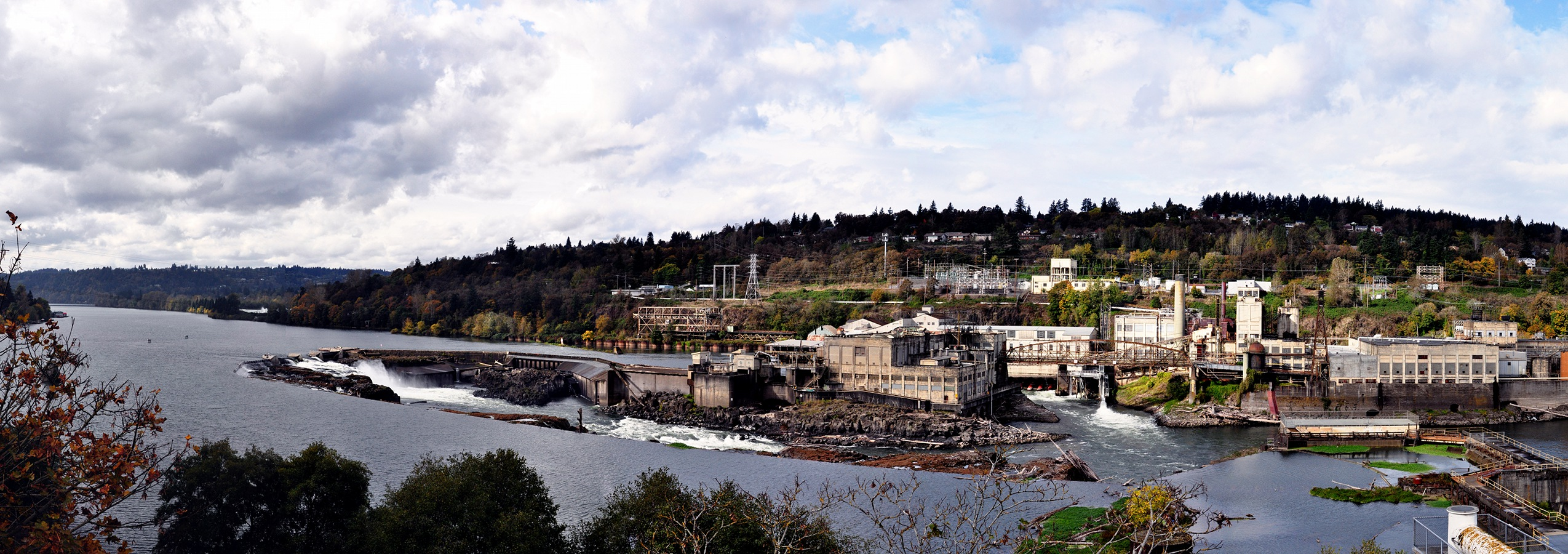
The weir-type dam at Willamette Falls

There are more than 20 major dams on the Willamette's tributaries, as well as a complex series of levees and channels to control the river's flow.

The only dam on the Willamette's main stem is the Willamette Falls Dam, a low weir-type structure at Willamette Falls that diverts water into the headraces of the adjacent mills and a power plant. The locks at Willamette Falls were completed in 1873. Elsewhere on the main stem, numerous minor flow-regulation structures force the river into a narrower and deeper channel to facilitate navigation and flood control.

The dams on the Willamette's major tributaries are primarily large flood-control, water-storage, and power-generating dams. Thirteen of these dams were built from the 1940s through the 1960s and are operated by the United States Army Corps of Engineers (USACE). Of those 13, 9 produce hydropower. Flood-control dams operated by the USACE are estimated to hold up to 27 percent of the Willamette's runoff. They are used to regulate river flows so as to cut peaks off floods and increase low flows in late summer and autumn, and to divert water into deeper, narrower channels to prevent flooding. A relatively small of amount of the water stored in the reservoirs is used for irrigation.

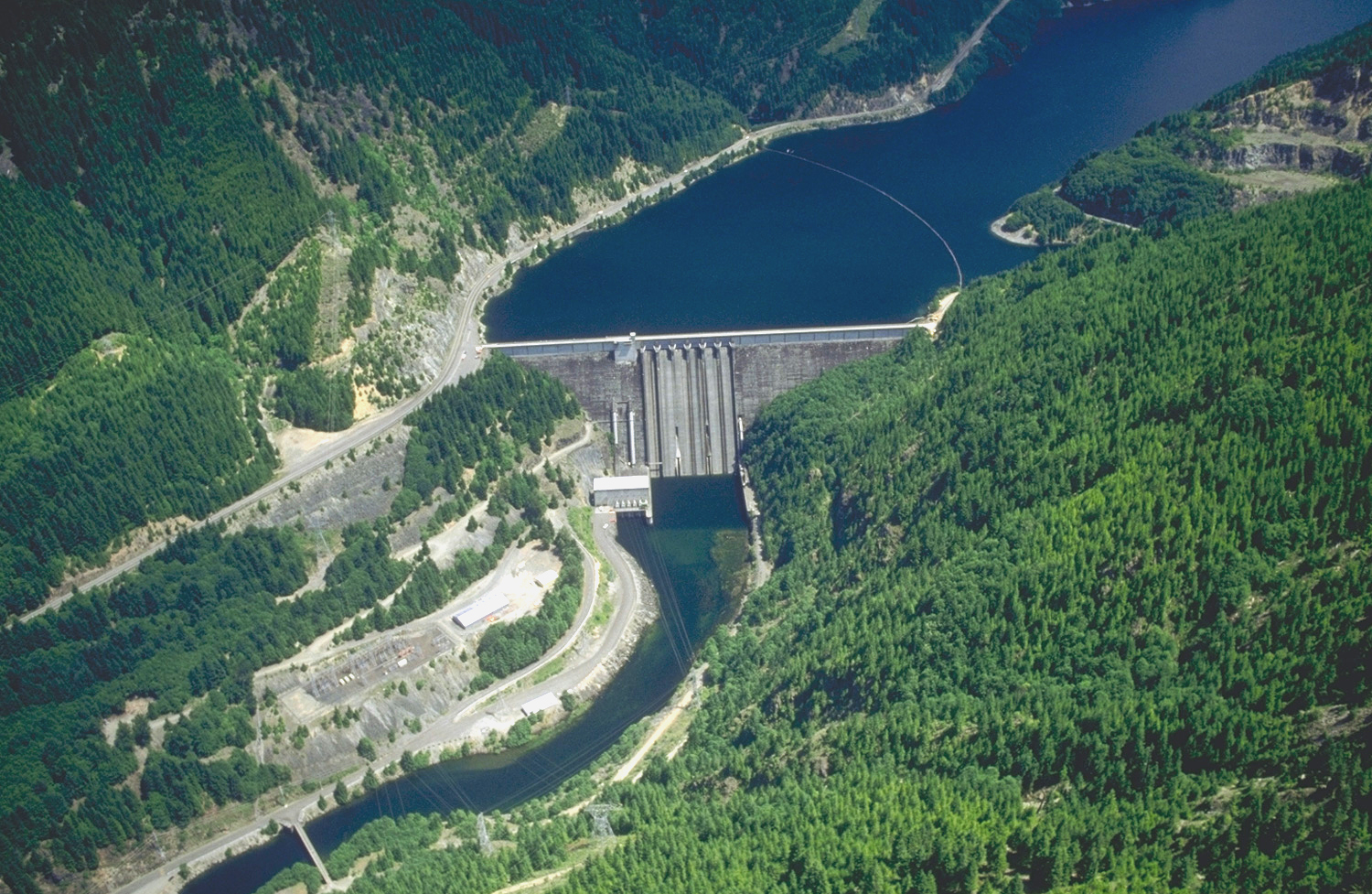
Detroit Dam, the basin's second tallest

Cougar Dam on the South Fork McKenzie River and Detroit Dam on the North Santiam River are the two tallest dams in the Willamette River basin. Detroit Dam is 463 feet (141 m) high and stores 455,000 acre-feet (561,000,000 m^{3}) of water. Lookout Point Dam on the Middle Fork Willamette River, forming Lookout Point Lake, has the largest water storage capacity, at 477,700 acre-feet (589,200,000 m^{3}). The other 11 dams are Big Cliff on the North Santiam River; Green Peter and Foster on the Santiam River; Cougar on the South Fork McKenzie River; Blue River on the Blue River; Fern Ridge on the Long Tom River; Hills Creek and Dexter on the Middle Fork Willamette River; Fall Creek on Fall Creek; Cottage Grove on the Coast Fork Willamette River, and Dorena on the Row River.

Due to these tall dams, Chinook salmon and steelhead are blocked from roughly half of their historic habitat and spawning grounds on the Willamette's major tributaries. Unable to live and reproduce as they once did, they have been "brought to the brink of extinction". Endangered species listings and a subsequent lawsuit by Willamette Riverkeeper led to a plan to improve fish passage and take other actions to help native fish recover in 2008. Since then, work has proceeded slowly, and the Corps of Engineers, citing engineering difficulties and cost, may not meet the original agreed-upon deadline of 2023 for a system of effective remedies.

Other major dams in the Willamette watershed are owned by other interests; for example, several hydroelectric facilities on the Clackamas River are owned by Portland General Electric. These include the River Mill Hydroelectric Project, the Oak Grove project, and the dam at Timothy Lake.

== Bridges ==
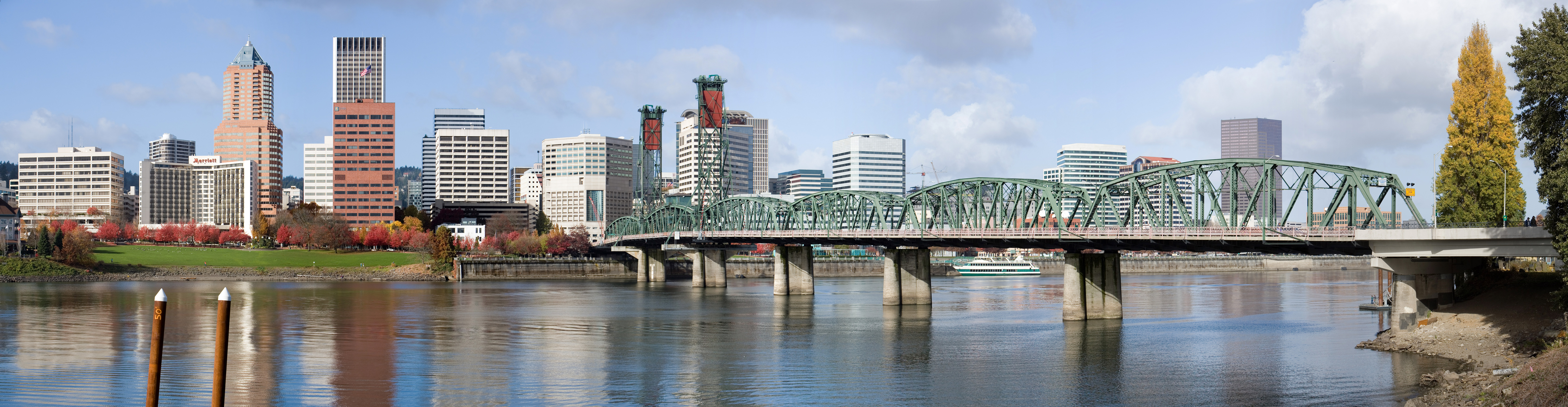
The Hawthorne Bridge is the oldest remaining highway structure over the Willamette.

The 50 or so crossings of the Willamette River include many historic structures, such as the Van Buren Street Bridge, a swing bridge. Built in 1913, it carries Oregon Route 34 (Corvallis–Lebanon Highway) over the river upstream of RM 131 (RK 211) in Corvallis. The machinery to operate the swing span was removed in the 1950s. The Oregon City Bridge, built in 1922, replaced a suspension span constructed at the site in 1888. It carries Oregon Route 43 over the river at about RM 26 (RK 42) between Oregon City and West Linn.

The Ross Island Bridge carries U.S. Route 26 (Mount Hood Highway) over the river at RM 14 (RK 23). It is one of 10 highway bridges crossing the river in Portland. The 3,700-foot (1,100 m) bridge is the only cantilevered deck truss in Oregon.

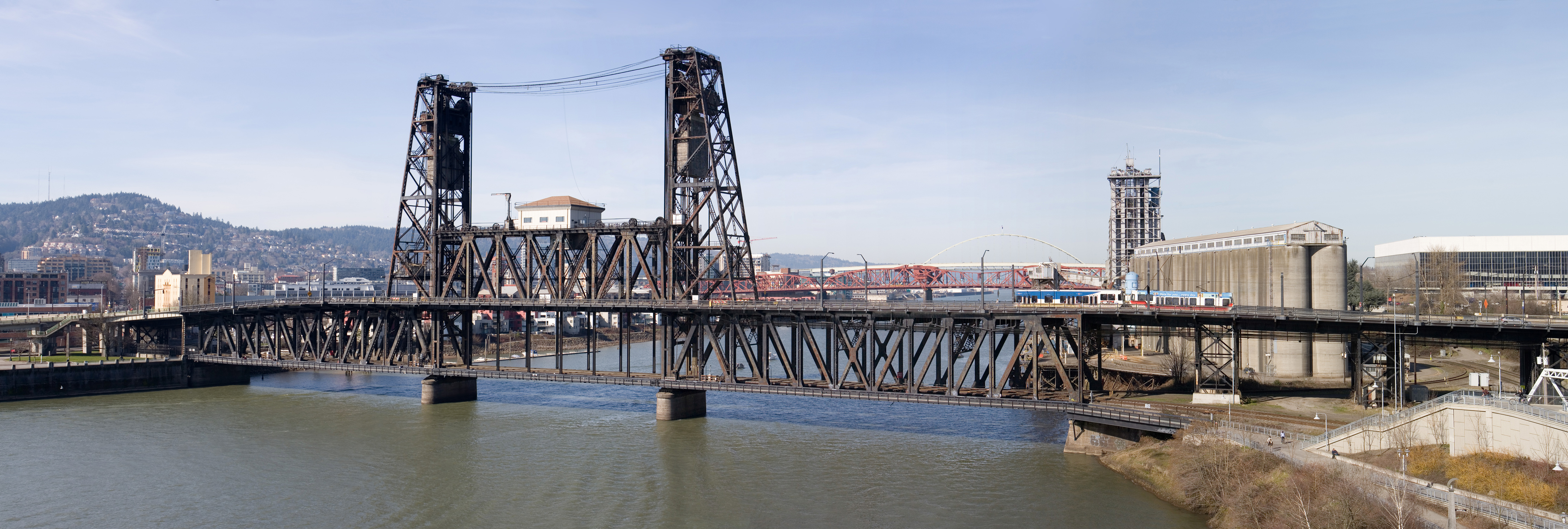
The lower deck of the Steel Bridge can be raised independently of the upper deck.

Tilikum Crossing is a 1,720-foot (520 m) cable-stayed bridge that carries public transit, bicycles, and pedestrians, but no cars or trucks, over the river. It opened for general use on September 12, 2015, becoming the first new bridge built across the river in the Portland metropolitan area since 1973.

Farther downstream is the oldest remaining highway structure over the Willamette, the Hawthorne Bridge, built in 1910. It is the oldest vertical-lift bridge in operation in the United States and the oldest highway bridge in Portland. It is also the busiest bicycle and transit bridge in Oregon, with over 8,000 cyclists and 800 TriMet buses (carrying about 17,400 riders) daily.

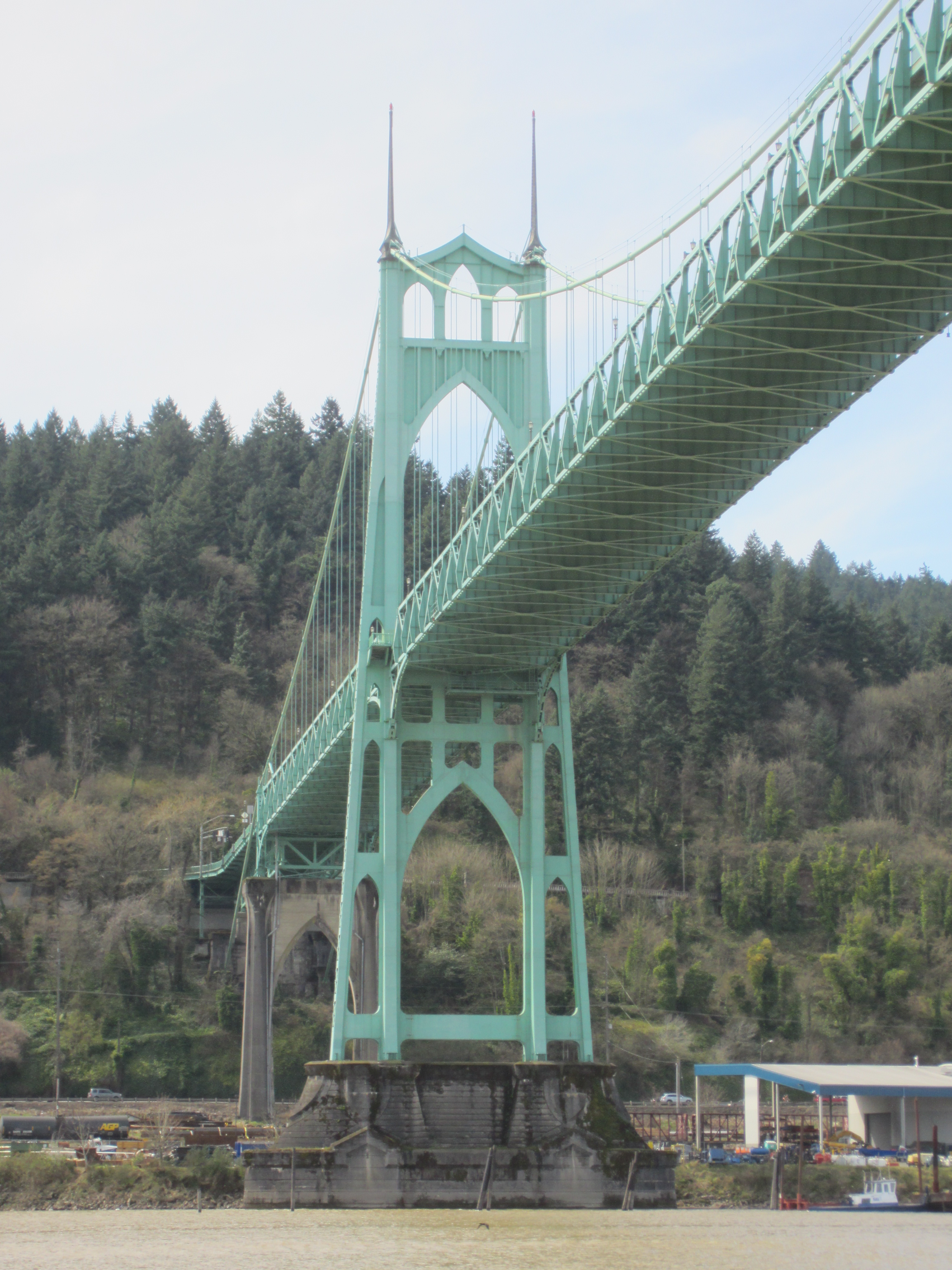
The St. Johns Bridge in northwest Portland

Another historic structure, the Steel Bridge, farther downstream, was "the largest telescoping bridge in the world at the time of its opening" in 1912. It carries trains on its lower deck, MAX (Metropolitan Area Express) light-rail trains and motorized vehicles on its upper deck, and foot and bicycle traffic on a cantilevered walkway attached to the lower deck. When small ships must pass under the bridge, its double vertical-lift span can raise a lower railway deck without disturbing traffic on the upper deck. Operators can raise both decks as high as 163 feet (50 m) above the water. The Steel Bridge is "believed to be the world's only double-lift span that can raise its lower deck independently of the upper deck."

The Broadway Bridge, slightly downstream of the Steel Bridge, was the world's longest double-leaf bascule drawbridge at the time of its construction in 1913. Farther downstream, the St. Johns Bridge, a steel suspension bridge built in 1931, replaced the last of the Willamette River ferries in Portland. At about RM 6 (RK 10), it carries the U.S. Route 30 Bypass. The bridge has two Gothic towers supporting the span. The adjacent park and neighborhood of Cathedral Park are named after the Gothic Cathedral-like appearance of the bridge towers. It is the tallest bridge in Portland, with 400-foot (120 m) tall towers and a 205-foot (62 m) navigational clearance.

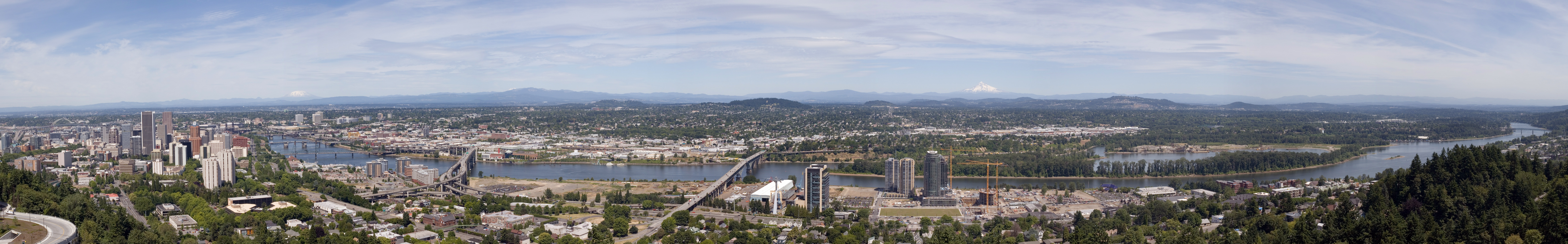
The Willamette as it passes through Portland. The bridges seen, from left to right, are the Fremont, Steel, Burnside, Morrision, Hawthorne, Marquam, Ross Island and Sellwood. The Tilikum Crossing bridge was not built at the time of this 2007 photo.

== Flooding ==
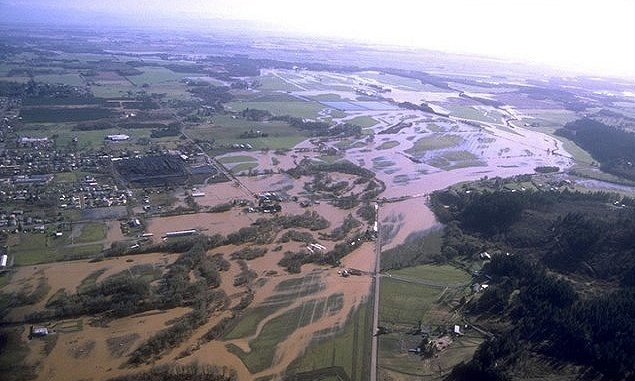
An aerial view of the 1996 flooding

Due to the volume and seasonality of precipitation in western Oregon, the Willamette River has often flooded. Heavy rains and mountain snows are common in winter, and snowpack in the Cascade Range can rapidly melt during warmer winter storms. The greatest Willamette River flood in recorded history began in 1861, well before the construction of dams in the watershed.

Rainstorms and warm temperatures in December 1861 combined with a well-above-average snowpack in the Cascades created the largest Willamette River flood in recorded history. An observer of the flood wrote, "The whole Willamette valley was a sheet of water". From Eugene to Portland, thousands of acres of farmland were washed away, and many towns in the valley were damaged or destroyed. The "Great Flood", as it is sometimes called, was massively destructive to human development because most of that development was located on the river's floodplain, which provided rich soils and ready access to water transportation. The 1861 flood peaked at 635,000 cubic feet per second (18,000 m^{3}/s)—more than the Mississippi River usually discharges in the 21st century—and inundated some 353,000 acres (1,430 km^{2}) of land. This flood destroyed the town of Linn City. When the flood ended on December 14, only three homes remained standing in Linn City. No one died in the Linn City flood, but the destruction was too significant for the town to recover, and it was abandoned. Today the city of West Linn stands about where Linn City once was.

Significant flooding recurred in the winter of early 1890. Portland's main street was completely submerged, communication over the Cascades was cut off, and many rail lines were forced to shut down. Another major flood occurred on the Willamette in 1894, and although it too caused much damage, it was not as large as that of 1861.

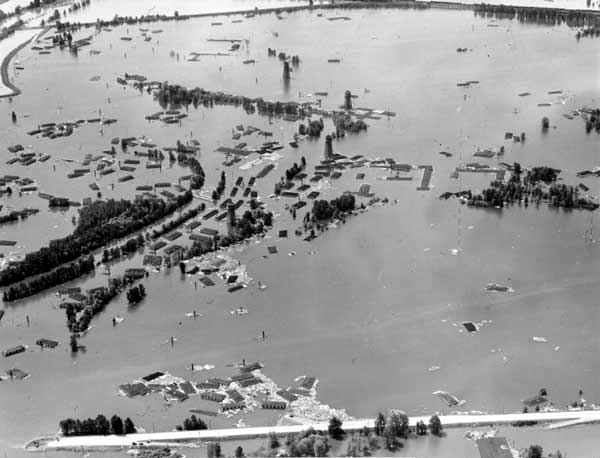
The remains of Vanport City in June 1948

Throughout the 1940s the Willamette continued to flood its valley. It washed out five bridges in Lane County in December 1942, caused seven deaths in Portland and evacuations in Eugene in January 1943, flooded Corvallis in November 1946, contributed to the destruction of Vanport City and the death of about 15 of its residents in May 1948, and nearly flooded parts of Salem in December 1948.

Although the Willamette was, by the mid-20th century, heavily engineered and controlled by a complex system of dams, channels, and barriers, it experienced severe floods through the end of the century. Storms caused a major flood that swelled the Willamette and other rivers in the Pacific Northwest from December 1964 through January 1965, submerging nearly 153,000 acres (620 km^{2}) of land. Before dawn on December 21, 1964, the Willamette reached 29.4 feet (9.0 m), which was higher than the seawall on its banks in Portland. By this time, about 15 people had died as a result of the flooding, and about 8,000 had been forced to evacuate their homes.

On December 24, 1964, President Lyndon B. Johnson ordered federal aid for the flooded areas as the Willamette continued to rise. In the next couple of days, the river receded, but on December 27, it was at 29.8 feet (9.1 m), which was still nearly 12 feet (3.7 m) above the flood stage. The river continued to pose flood threats through January 1965, and more stormy weather occurred along the Pacific Coast.

The river crested at one town after another—at Corvallis 3½ feet above flood stage, Oregon City 18 feet above, Portland 10.5 feet above—much like a meal moving through a boa constrictor.

— Associated Press, February 10, 1996

In February 1996, heavy warm rains driven by a subtropical jet stream fell on a deep snowpack in the Willamette watershed. These conditions, similar to those that caused the 1861 flood, caused some of the costliest flooding in the river's recorded history. An Associated Press journalist reported, "The river crested at one town after another—at Corvallis 3½ feet above flood stage, Oregon City 18 feet above, Portland 10.5 feet above—much like a meal moving through a boa constrictor." The flood was serious enough to interrupt the progress of Oregon's growing economy, but the inundated acreage was smaller than in 1964—only about 117,000 acres (470 km^{2}).

About 450 concrete flood-protection walls in Portland that had been constructed during the February flood, each weighing about 5,500 pounds (2,500 kg), were removed in April 1996. In October, they were replaced by a larger steel wall that cost the city about $300,000. The new wall had 0.25-inch (6.4 mm) removable steel plates designed to better prevent future flooding.

== Pollution ==
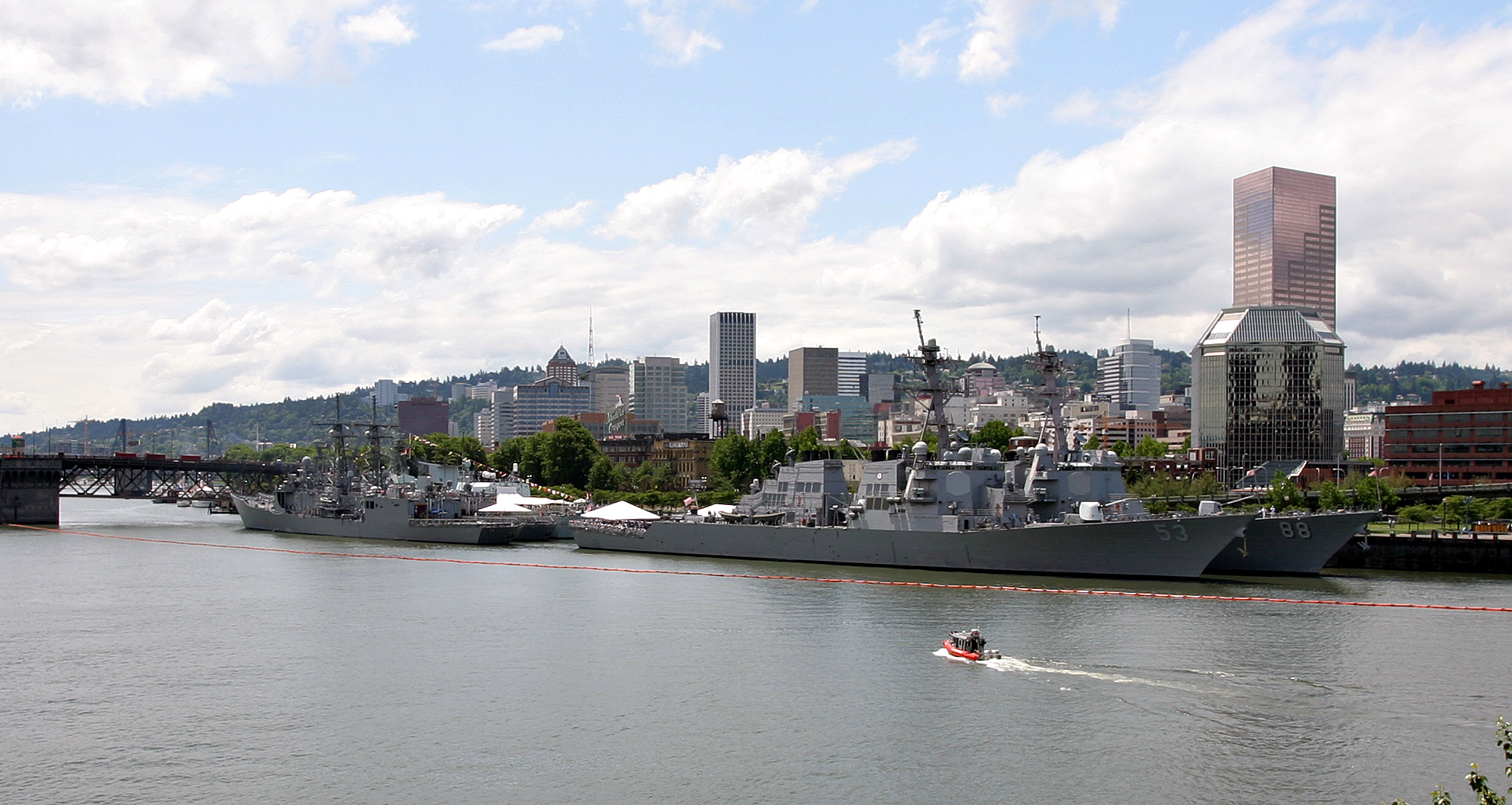
The Tom McCall Waterfront Park is named after the Oregon governor who led a cleanup of the river.

Since as early as 1869, with the introduction of a federally funded "snag puller" designed to keep the waterway clear, human habitation has affected the ecology of the river basin. Domestic and industrial waste from the cities built up along the river "essentially [turned] the main-stem river into an open sewer by the 1920s." The construction of large federal dams on the Willamette's tributaries between 1941 and 1969 damaged the spawning grounds for spring Chinook salmon and steelhead.

A 1927 City Club of Portland report labeled the waterway "filthy and ugly" and identified the City of Portland as the worst offender. The Oregon Anti-Stream Pollution League brought a pollution-abatement measure before the 39th Oregon Legislative Assembly in 1937. The bill passed, but Governor Charles Martin vetoed it. The Izaak Walton League and the Oregon affiliate of the National Wildlife Federation countered the governor's veto with a ballot initiative, which passed in November 1938.

Governor Tom McCall, shortly after he was elected in 1966, ordered water quality tests on the Willamette, conducted his own research on the water quality, and became head of the Oregon State Sanitary Authority. McCall learned that the river was heavily polluted in Portland. In a television documentary, Pollution in Paradise, he said, "The Willamette River was actually cleaner when the Oregon Sanitary Authority was created in 1938 than it was in 1962." He then discouraged tourism in the state and made it harder for companies to qualify for a permit to operate near the river. He also regulated how much those companies could pollute and closed plants that did not meet state pollution standards.

Despite earlier cleanup efforts, state studies in the 1990s identified a wide variety of pollutants in the river bottom, including heavy metals, polychlorinated biphenyls (PCBs), and pesticides along the lower 12 miles (19 km) of the river, in Portland. As a result, this section of the river was designated a Superfund site in 2000, involving the U.S. Environmental Protection Agency (EPA) in cleanup of the river bottom. The area to be addressed stretches from the Fremont Bridge almost to the Columbia – spanning nearly 11 river miles. Reducing risk from the pollutants in this stretch will involve removing contaminated sediment from the river bottom and efforts to contain contaminated sediment by placing clean sediment on top (known as "capping"). Pollution has been exacerbated by combined sewer overflows, which the city has greatly reduced through its Big Pipe Project. Farther upstream, the pressing environmental issues have mainly been variations in pH and dissolved oxygen. The Willamette is nevertheless clean enough to be used by cities such as Corvallis and Wilsonville for drinking water.

Since pollution concerns are primarily along the lower river, the Willamette in general scores relatively high on the Oregon Water Quality Index (OWQI), which is compiled by the Oregon Department of Environmental Quality (DEQ). The DEQ considers index scores of less than 60 to be very poor; the other categories are 60–79 (poor); 80–84 (fair); 85–89 (good), and 90–100 (excellent). The Willamette River's water quality is rated excellent near the source, though it gradually declines to fair near the mouth. Between 1998 and 2007, the average score for the upper Willamette at Springfield (RM 185, RK 298) was 93. At Salem (RM 84, RK 135), the score was 89, and good scores continued down to the Hawthorne Bridge in Portland (RM 13, RK 21) at 85. Scores were in the "fair" category farther downstream; the least favorable reading was 81 at the Swan Island Channel midpoint (RM 0.5, RK 0.8). By comparison, sites on the Winchuck River, the Clackamas, and the North Santiam all scored 95, and a site at a pump station on Klamath Strait Drain between Upper Klamath Lake and Lower Klamath Lake recorded the lowest score in Oregon at 19.

== Flora and fauna ==
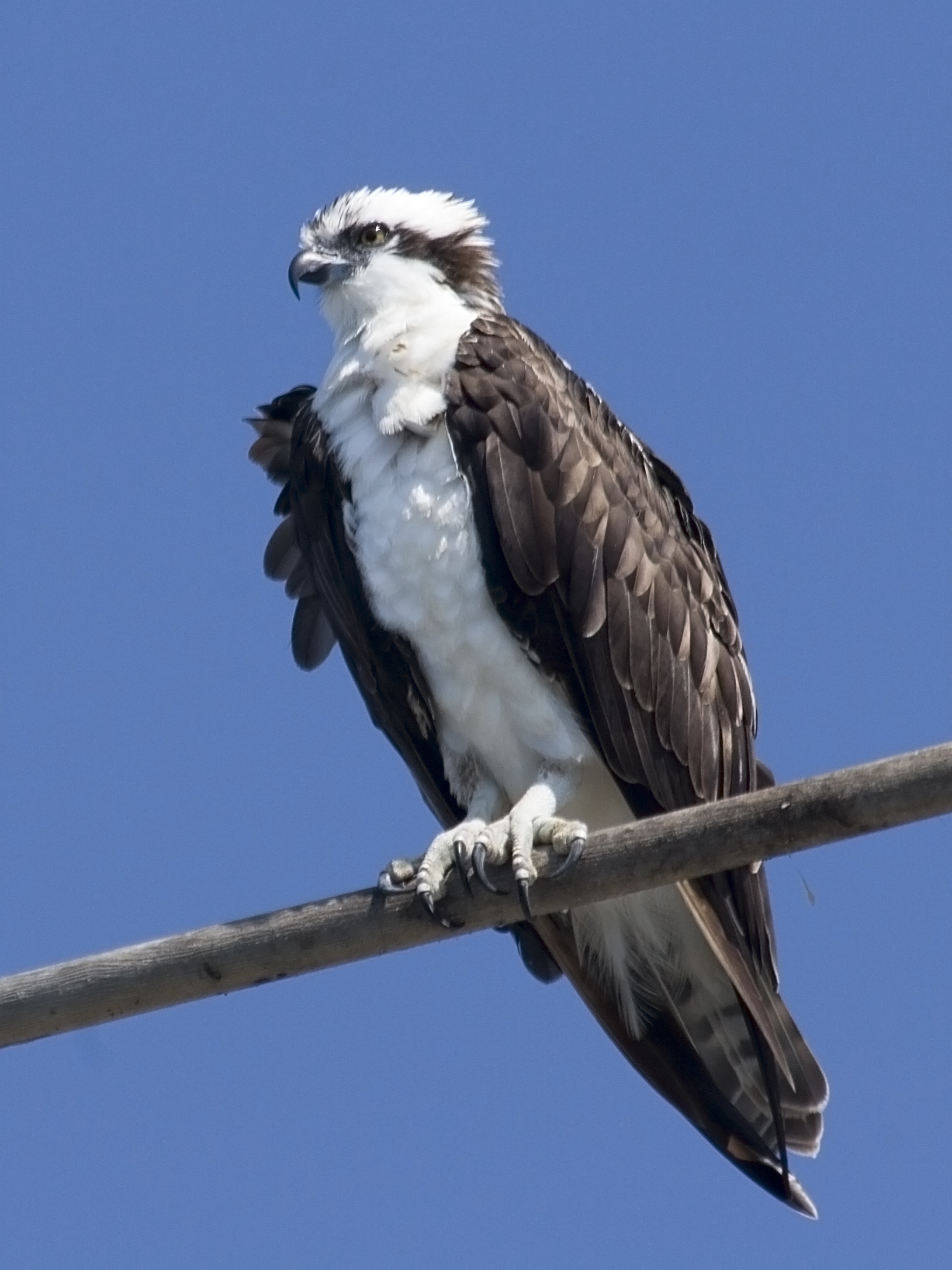
Osprey are among bird species often seen along the Willamette River.

Over the past 150 years, a significant change for the Willamette River has been the loss of its floodplain forests, which covered an estimated 89 percent of a 400-foot (120 m) band along each river bank in 1850. By 1990, only 37 percent of this zone was forested; the rest had been converted to farm fields or cleared for urban or suburban uses. The remaining forests close to the river include stands of black cottonwood, Oregon ash, willow, and bigleaf maple. The central valley—a former perennial grass prairie interspersed with oak, Douglas fir, ponderosa pine, and other trees—is devoted almost entirely to farming. Douglas fir, western hemlock, and western red cedar dominate the forest on the Coast Range side of the basin. Forests to the east in the Cascade Range are predominantly Douglas fir, Pacific silver fir, western hemlock, and western red cedar.

Fish in the Willamette basin include 31 native species, among them cutthroat, bull, and rainbow trout, several species of salmon, sucker, minnow, sculpin, and lamprey, as well as sturgeon, stickleback, and others. Among the 29 non-native species in the basin, there are brook, brown, and lake trout, largemouth and smallmouth bass, walleye, carp, bluegill, and others. In addition to fish, the basin supports 18 species of amphibians, such as the Pacific giant salamander. Beaver and river otter are among 69 mammal species living in the watershed, also frequented by 154 bird species, such as the American dipper, osprey, and harlequin duck. Garter snakes are among the 15 species of reptiles found in the basin.

Species diversity is greatest along the lower river and its tributaries. Threatened, endangered, or sensitive species include spring Chinook salmon, winter steelhead, chum salmon, Coho salmon and Oregon chub. In the central valley, several projects have been done to restore and protect wetlands in order to provide habitat for bald eagles, Fender's blue butterfly, Oregon chub, Bradshaw's desert parsley, a variety of Willamette fleabane, and Kincaid's lupine. In the early 21st century, osprey populations are increasing along the river, possibly because of a ban on the pesticide DDT and on the birds' ability to use power poles for nesting. Beaver populations, presumed to be much lower than historic levels, are increasing throughout the basin.

== See also ==
- Frog Ferry
- List of crossings of the Willamette River
- List of longest streams of Oregon
- List of rivers of Oregon
- Steamboats of the Willamette River

== Works cited ==
- — "Oregon Water Quality Index Summary Report, Water Years 1998–2007" (PDF), May 2008. Oregon Department of Environmental Quality. Retrieved April 10, 2011.
- Benke, Arthur C., ed., and Cushing, Colbert E., ed.; Stanford, Jack A.; Gregory, Stanley V.; Hauer, Richard F.; Snyder, Eric B. (2005). "Chapter 13: Columbia River Basin" in Rivers of North America. Burlington, Massachusetts: Elsevier Academic Press. ISBN 978-0-12-088253-3. OCLC 59003378.
- Bright, William (2004). Native American Placenames of the United States. Norman, Oklahoma: University of Oklahoma Press. ISBN 978-0-8061-3576-2. OCLC 53019644.
- Campbell, Lyle (1997). American Indian Languages. New York, New York: Oxford University Press. ISBN 978-0-19-509427-5. OCLC 247389024.
- Deur, Douglas; Turner, Nancy J. (2005). Keeping it Living: Traditions of Plant Use and Cultivation on the Northwest Coast of North America. Seattle: University of Washington Press. ISBN 978-0-7748-1267-2. OCLC 57316620.
- Edwards, G. Thomas; Schwantes, Carlos A. (1986). Experiences in a Promised Land: Essays in Pacific Northwest History. Seattle: University of Washington Press. ISBN 978-0-295-96328-0. OCLC 12805717.
- Engeman, Richard H. (2009). The Oregon Companion: A Historical Gazetteer of the Useful, the Curious, and the Arcane. Portland, Oregon: Timber Press. ISBN 978-0-88192-899-0. OCLC 236142647.
- Gulick, Bill (2004). Steamboats on Northwest Rivers. Caldwell, Idaho: Caxton Press. ISBN 978-0-87004-438-0. OCLC 53000219.
- Holman, Frederick Van Voorhies (1907). Dr. John McLoughlin, the Father of Oregon. Cleveland, Ohio: A. H. Clark Company. ISBN 978-1-131-13770-4. OCLC 365933029.
- Laenen, Antonius; Dunnette, David A. (1997). River Quality: Dynamics and Restoration. Boca Raton, Florida: CRC Press. ISBN 978-1-56670-138-9. OCLC 34885999.
- Loy, Willam G.; Allan, Stuart Allan; Buckley, Aileen R.; Meecham, James E. (2001) [1976]. Atlas of Oregon (2nd ed.). Eugene, Oregon: University of Oregon Press. ISBN 978-0-87114-101-9. OCLC 228223337.
- Mackie, Richard Somerset (1997). Trading Beyond the Mountains: the British Fur Trade on the Pacific, 1793–1843. Vancouver: UBC Press. ISBN 978-0-7748-0613-8. OCLC 82135549.
- McArthur, Lewis A.; McArthur, Lewis L. (2003) [1928]. Oregon Geographic Names (7th ed.). Portland, Oregon: Oregon Historical Society Press. ISBN 978-0-87595-277-2. OCLC 53075956.
- Meinig, D.W. (1998). The Shaping of America: A Geographical Perspective on 500 Years of History, Volume 3: Transcontinental America, 1850–1915. New Haven, Connecticut: Yale University Press. ISBN 978-0-300-08290-6. OCLC 60197763.
- Orr, Elizabeth L.; Orr, William N. (1999). Geology of Oregon (5th ed.). Dubuque, Iowa: Kendall/Hunt Publishing Company. ISBN 978-0-7872-6608-0. OCLC 42944922.
- Orr, Elizabeth L.; Orr, William N. (2012). Oregon Geology (6th ed.). Corvallis, Oregon: Oregon State University Press. ISBN 9780870716812. OCLC 794227917.
- Ruby, Robert H.; Brown, John A. (1976). The Chinook Indians: Traders of the Lower Columbia River. Civilization of the American Indian. Norman, Oklahoma: University of Oklahoma Press. ISBN 978-0-8061-2107-9. OCLC 1958350.
- Samson, Karl (2010). Frommer's Oregon. Hoboken, New Jersey: Wiley-Blackwell. ISBN 978-0-470-53771-8. OCLC 671277501.
- Smith, Dwight A.; Norman, James B.; Dykman, Pieter T. (1989) [1986]. Historic Highway Bridges of Oregon (2nd ed.). Portland, Oregon: Oregon Historical Society Press. ISBN 978-0-87595-205-5. OCLC 20362124.
- Snipp, C. Matthew (1989). American Indians: The First of This Land. New York, New York: Russell Sage Foundation. ISBN 978-0-87154-822-1. OCLC 19670797.
- Stenzel, Franz (1972). Cleveland Rockwell: Scientist and Artist, 1837–1907. Portland, Oregon: Oregon Historical Society. ISBN 978-0-87595-037-2. OCLC 333762.
- Thornton, Russell (1990). American Indian Holocaust and Survival: A Population History Since 1492. Civilization of the American Indian. Norman, Oklahoma: University of Oklahoma Press. ISBN 978-0-8061-2220-5. OCLC 263150623.
- Timmen, Fritz (1973). Blow for the Landing. Atglen, Pennsylvania: Schiffer. OCLC 38286714.
- U.S. Coast & Geodetic Survey (1887). Report of the Superintendent of the U.S. Coast and Geodetic Survey Showing the Progress of the Work during the Fiscal Year Ending with June 1886. Washington, D.C.: Government Printing Office. OCLC 28937852.
- Wallick, Jennifer Rose; Grant, Gordon E.; Lancaster, Stephen T.; Bolte, John P.; Denlinger, Roger P. (2007). "Patterns and Controls on Historical Channel Change in the Willamette River, Oregon, USA". In Gupta, Avijit (ed.). Large Rivers: Geomorphology and Management. Chichester, England: John Wiley & Sons. ISBN 978-0-470-84987-3.
- Wilkes, Charles (1845). Narrative of the United States' Exploring Expedition, During the Years 1838, 1839, 1840, 1841, 1842: Condensed and Abridged. London: Whittaker and Co. OCLC 602918838.
- Williams, Travis (2009). The Willamette River Field Guide. Portland, Oregon: Timber Press. ISBN 978-0-88192-866-2. OCLC 243601804.
- Wortman, Sharon Wood; Wortman, Ed.; Norman, James B. (2006). The Portland Bridge Book (3rd ed.). Portland, Oregon: Urban Adventure Press. ISBN 978-0-9787365-1-4. OCLC 76928209.
