= Blue River (Oregon) =

Tributary of the McKenzie River in Linn and Lane counties in the U.S. state of Oregon

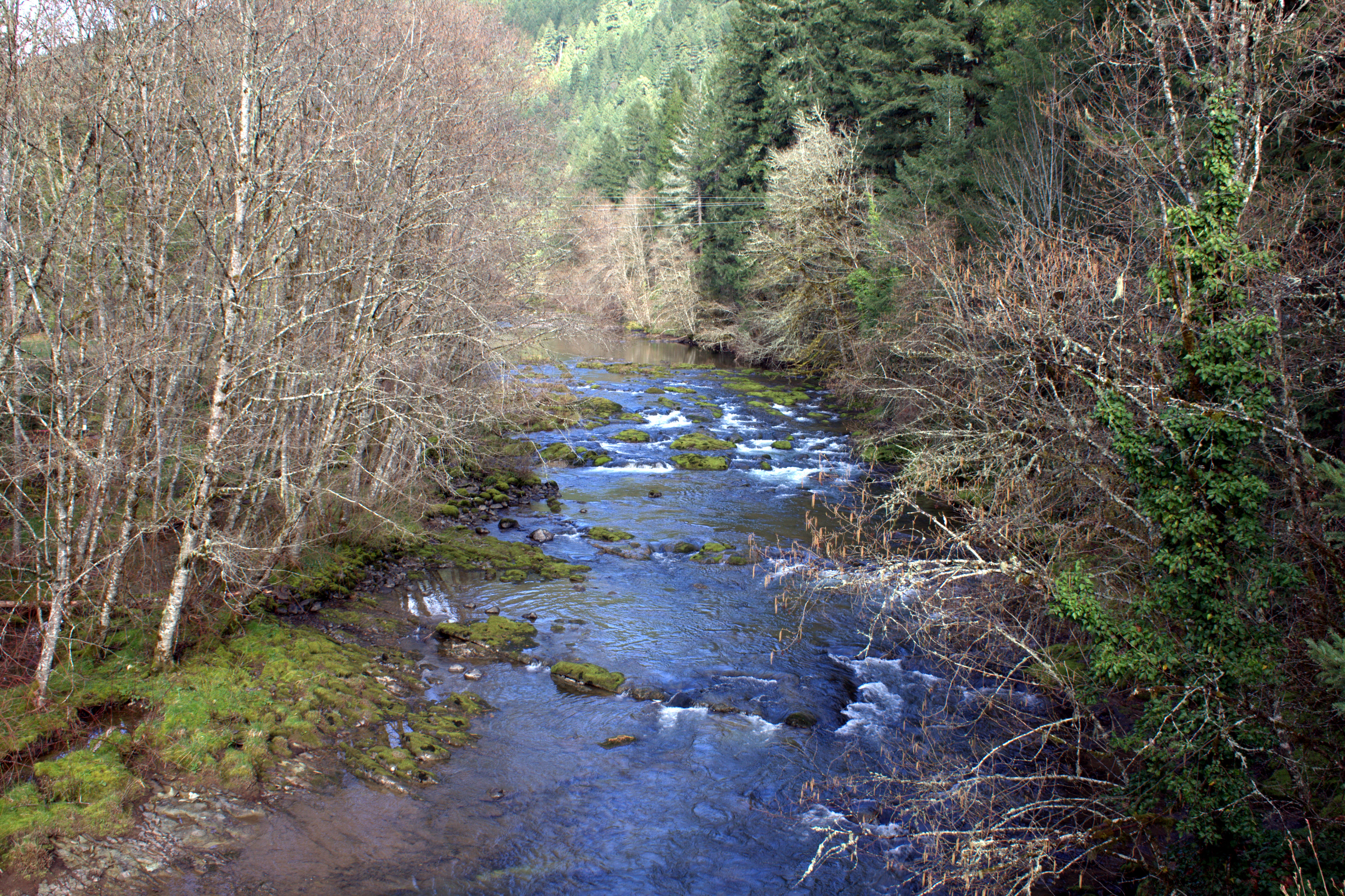
- Flowing through the forest

- Location of the mouth of the Blue River in Oregon

Location
- Country: United States
- State: Oregon
- County: Lane and Linn

Physical characteristics
- Source: Confluence of Wolf Creek and Mann Creek
  - location: Willamette National Forest, Cascade Range, Linn County
  - coordinates: 44°17′41″N 122°10′17″W
  - elevation: 2,504 ft (763 m)
- Mouth: McKenzie River
  - location: Blue River, Lane County
  - coordinates: 44°09′15″N 122°20′42″W
  - elevation: 1,040 ft (320 m)
- Length: 17 mi (27 km)
- Basin size: 87 sq mi (230 km^{2})
- Discharge
  - location: near Blue River, 0.9 miles (1.4 km) from the mouth
  - average: 457 cu ft/s (12.9 m^{3}/s)
  - minimum: 0.80 cu ft/s (0.023 m^{3}/s)
  - maximum: 7,270 cu ft/s (206 m^{3}/s)

Blue River is a tributary of the McKenzie River in Linn and Lane counties in the U.S. state of Oregon. From its source at the confluence of Mann and Wolf creeks in the Cascade Range, it flows generally southwest to join the McKenzie near the community of Blue River. Saddle Dam and Blue River Dam block the river about 2 miles (3 km) from its mouth to form Blue River Reservoir, a multipurpose impoundment built in 1968 by the United States Army Corps of Engineers.

The river's watershed lies almost entirely within the Willamette National Forest, dominated by western hemlock and Douglas-fir. Blue River was named for the striking blue color that apparently comes from its rocky bed.

== Course ==
Blue River begins on the western slopes of the Cascade Range at the confluence of Mann and Wolf creeks in Linn County, slightly north of its border with Lane County. Descending from an elevation of about 2,500 feet (760 m) above sea level, the river flows generally southwest through the Willamette National Forest. Forest Road 15 follows the river along its right bank from its source to about river mile (RM) 9 or river kilometer (RK) 14.

The upper river receives Quentin Creek from the right before crossing the border into Lane County. Just southwest of the border, the river receives Cook Creek, also from the right. Just beyond RM 9 (RK 14), the river passes under Forest Road 15 and receives Tidbits Creek from the right. At this point, the river turns sharply south, and Forest Road 15 runs along its left bank. Just before entering Blue River Reservoir, about 8 miles (13 km) from the mouth, the river receives Mona Creek from the right and passes under Forest Road 120, which leads to Mona Campground.

A fraction of a mile beyond the mouth of Mona Creek, Lookout Creek enters from the left near the Lookout Campground and Boat Launch, and Mona Campground is on the right. Blue River and the reservoir curve to the southwest, and Scott Creek enters from the right at RM 5 (RK 8). On the opposite shore at this point is Saddle Dam and its boat launch, which lie outside the national forest. At this point, Forest Road 15 leaves the river and the reservoir and heads south to Oregon Route 126.

As Blue River nears Blue River Dam, about 2 miles (3 km) from the mouth, Quartz Creek and North Fork Quartz Creek enter from the right. Below the dam, Forest Road 125 runs parallel to the river along its right bank. The river passes a United States Geological Survey stream gauge below the dam, and then Simmonds Creek enters from the right. Blue River joins the McKenzie River at the community of Blue River, 57 miles (92 km) from the McKenzie's confluence with the Willamette River.

== See also ==
- List of rivers of Oregon
