= Finn Rock, Oregon =

Unincorporated community in the state of Oregon, United States

- Unincorporated community
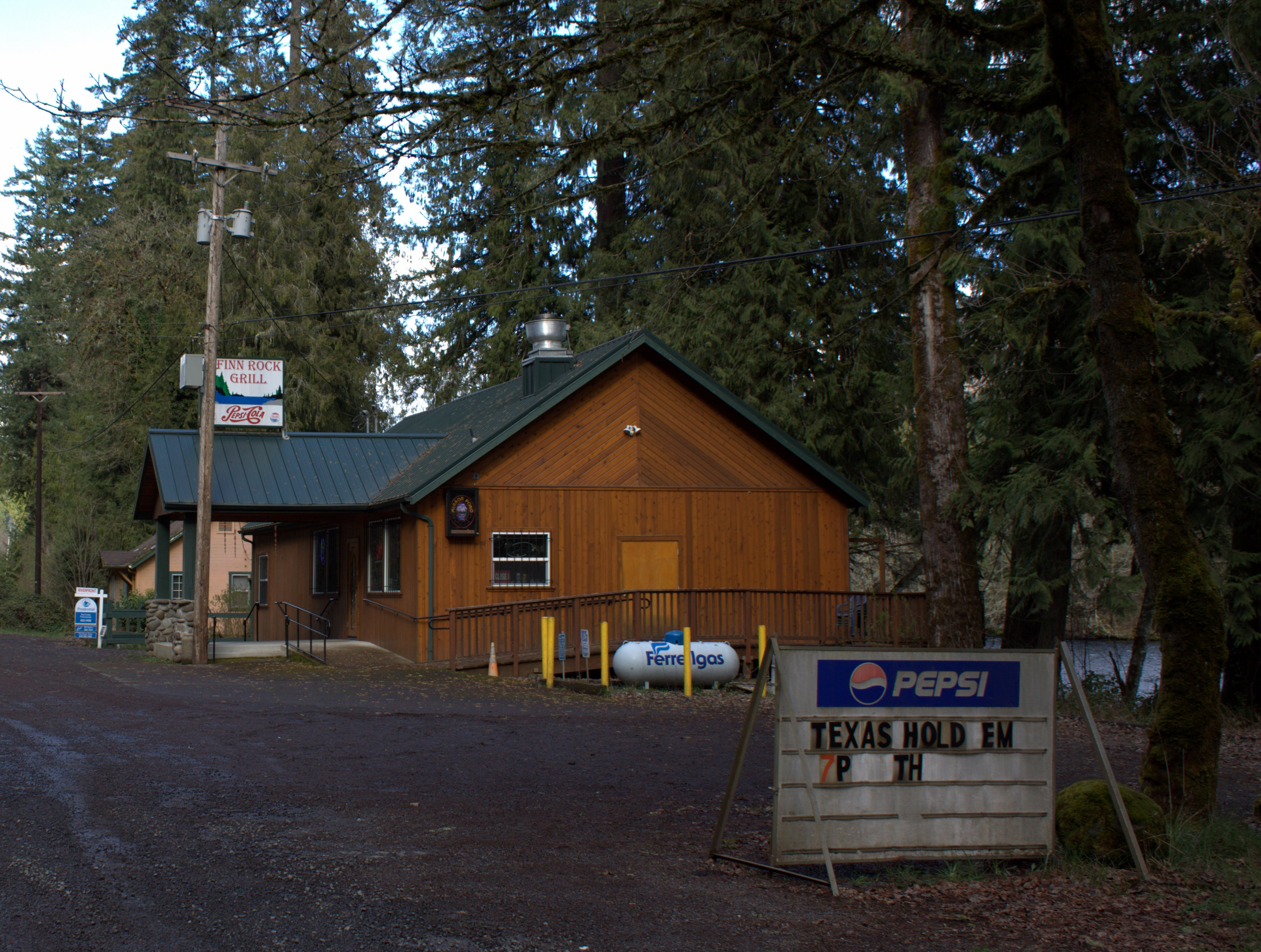
- Closed restaurant in Finn Rock

- Location within Oregon Location within the United States
- Coordinates: 44°07′44″N 122°22′58″W
- Country: United States
- State: Oregon
- County: Lane
- Elevation: 1,303 ft (397 m)
- Time zone: UTC-8 (Pacific (PST))
  - Summer (DST): UTC-7 (PDT)
- ZIP code: 97488
- Area codes: 458 and 541
- GNIS feature ID: 1120718

Finn Rock is an unincorporated community in Lane County, Oregon, United States. It is located on Oregon Route 126 and the McKenzie River, between the communities of Nimrod and Blue River, in the Willamette National Forest.

Finn Rock was once a logging community and is named after an unusual rock formation on Route 126 near the mouth of Finn Creek. Although the rock resembles a shark's fin, the rock was named for Benjamin Franklin Finn, an early settler of the area. Ben Finn was known as "the biggest liar on the McKenzie River", and claimed to be the inspiration for Mark Twain's Huckleberry Finn. Finn Rock post office operated from 1947 until 1961. The 1929 general store building that also served as the post office is now a restaurant.

Finn Rock Rest Area, formerly known as Howard Morton State Park, is located near Finn Rock. McKenzie High School is located in Finn Rock.

== Notable residents ==
- Barry Lopez, author
