= Willamette Floodplain =

Floodplain of the Willamette river

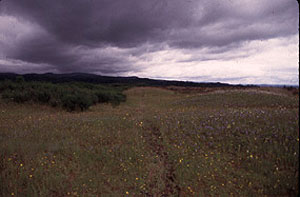
- Grassland of the Willamette Floodplain

- Location within Oregon
- Location: Benton County, Oregon, US
- Nearest city: Corvallis
- Coordinates: 44°24′49″N 123°17′57″W
- Area: 713 acres (289 ha)
- Designated: 1987
- Administrator: U.S. Fish and Wildlife Service

The Willamette Floodplain consists of 713 acres (289 ha) of natural grassland, near the Willamette River, that was made a National Natural Landmark in May 1987. The floodplain is within the William L. Finley National Wildlife Refuge and located about 10 miles (16 km) south of Corvallis in Benton County, Oregon.

It is the largest remaining native unplowed example of bottomland interior valley grassland in the North Pacific Border natural region. It was classified as a natural landmark because such grassland and shrubland areas are exceedingly rare, with most having been cultivated or turned into pastureland.
