= Blue River, Oregon =

Unincorporated community in the state of Oregon, United States

- Unincorporated community
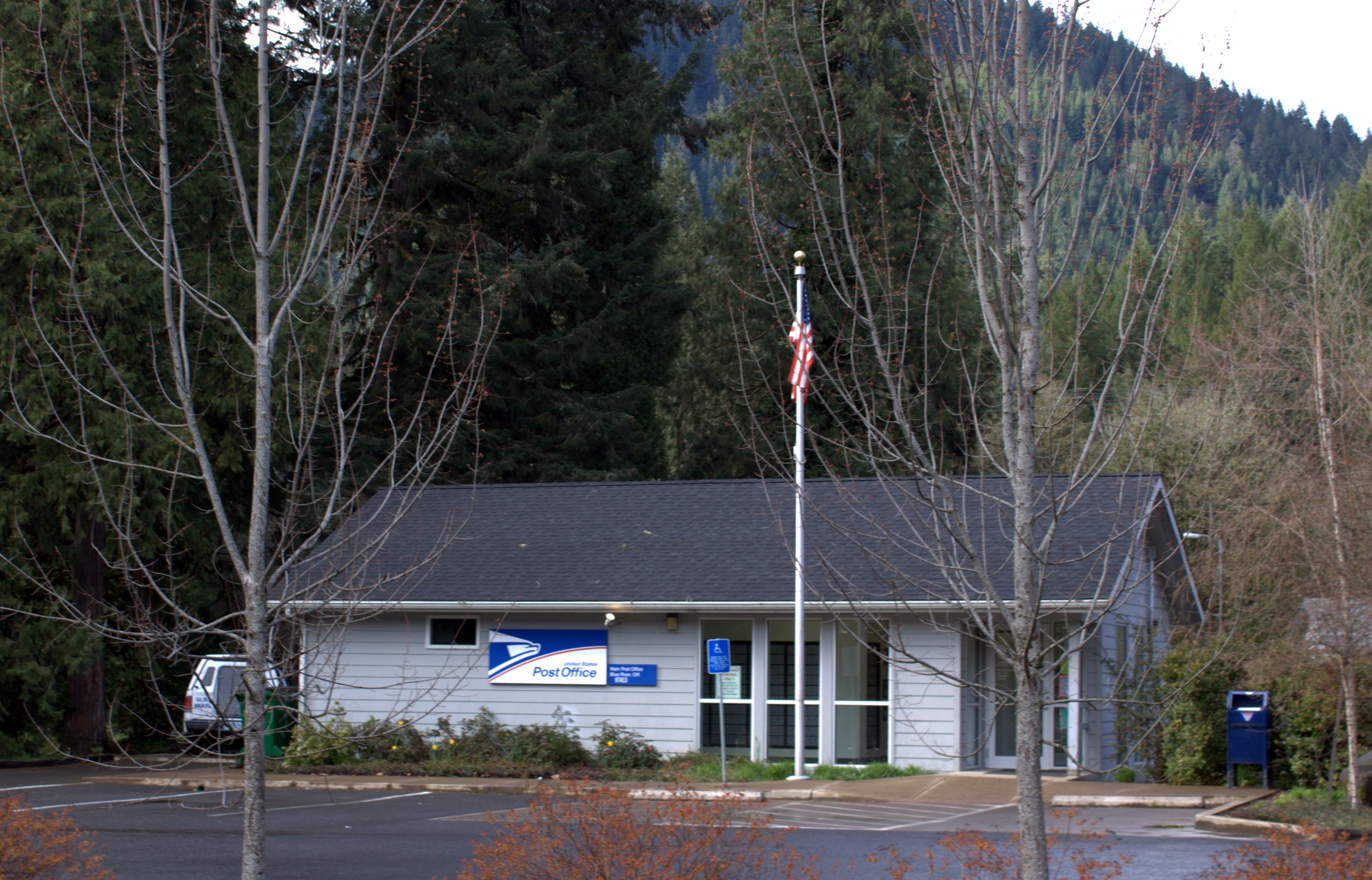
- Post office in Blue River

- Location within Oregon Location within the United States
- Coordinates: 44°09′16″N 122°20′28″W
- Country: United States
- State: Oregon
- County: Lane
- Elevation: 1,034 ft (315 m)
- Time zone: UTC-8 (Pacific (PST))
  - Summer (DST): UTC-7 (PDT)
- ZIP code: 97413
- Area codes: 458 and 541
- GNIS feature ID: 1117861

Blue River is an unincorporated community in Lane County, Oregon, United States. It is located on Oregon Route 126 along the McKenzie River, between the communities of Finn Rock and Rainbow. It is in the Willamette National Forest, where the Blue River empties into the McKenzie. The community was named after the Blue River, which was named for the striking blue color that apparently comes from its rocky bed. Five miles northeast of the community, a dam on the Blue River forms the Blue River Reservoir.

== History ==
The area was first settled in the late 19th century by the Sparks family. Gold was discovered in the Blue River area in 1863, but by 1912, most gold mining activity had ended. The ore was low grade and the local stamp mills have not operated in many years. Records show, however, that the Lucky Boy Mine had extracted more than $1 million from the Blue River Mining District during the brief gold rush. Samuel Sparks and his sons laid out the town of Blue River in 1900 as part of 320 acres (1.3 km^{2}) they had acquired. Blue River post office was established in 1886.

The community's volunteer Frances O'Brien Memorial Library was founded in 1928. The library has no running water, does not set due dates on loans, and was originally left unlocked 24 hours a day.

The structures in Blue River were destroyed by the Holiday Farm Fire on September 8, 2020. The Frances O’Brien Memorial Library will temporarily operate out of the Upper McKenzie Community Center in Rainbow, Oregon.

== Climate ==
This region experiences warm and dry summers, with no average monthly temperatures above 71.6 °F (22.0 °C). According to the Köppen Climate Classification system, Blue River has a warm-summer Mediterranean climate, abbreviated "Csb" on climate maps.
