= McKenzie High School =

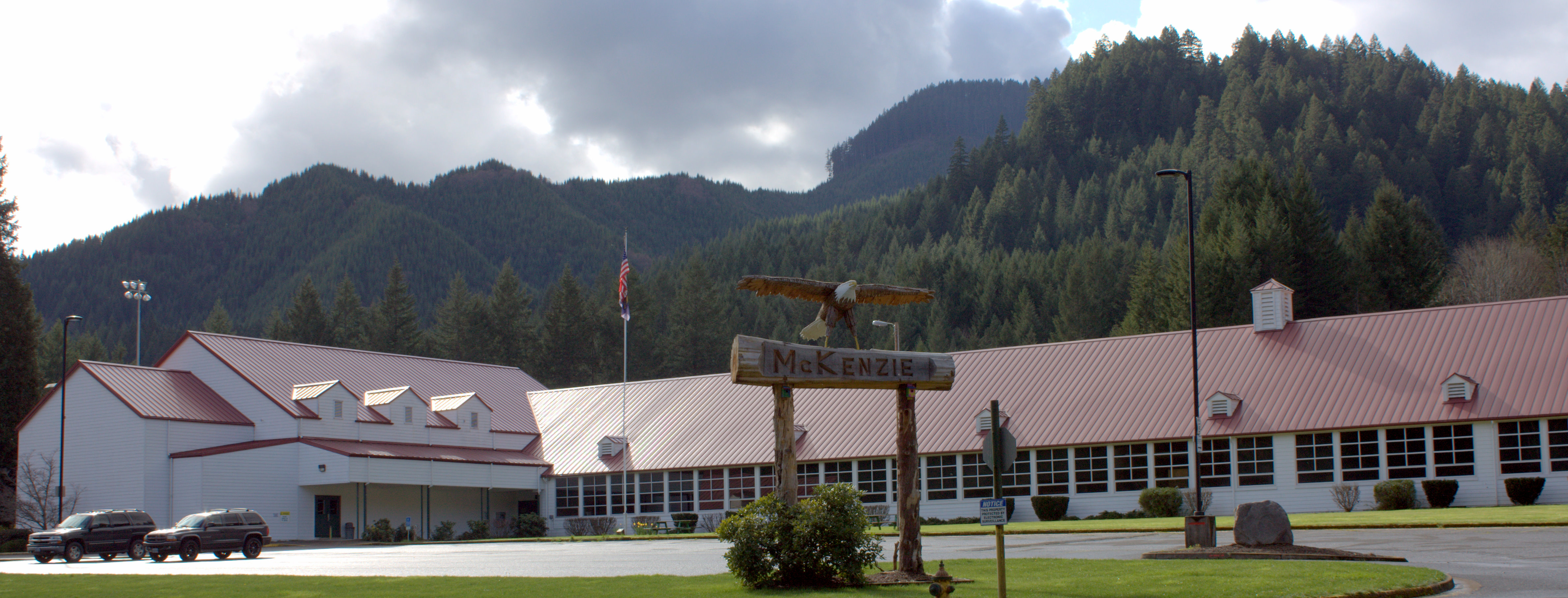

Location
- 51187 Blue River Drive; Finn Rock, Lane County, Oregon 97488; United States
- Coordinates: 44.15223°N 122.362493°W

Information
- Type: Public
- School district: McKenzie School District
- Principal: Lane Tompkins
- Grades: K-12
- Enrollment: 180 (2023-2024)
- Colors: Green and gold
- Athletics conference: OSAA Mountain West League 1A-3
- Mascot: Eagle

McKenzie High School is a public high school in Finn Rock, Oregon, United States.

== Academics ==
In 2008, 92% of the school's seniors received their high school diploma. Of 26 students, 24 graduated, 1 dropped out, and 1 received a modified diploma.
