= Blue River Reservoir =

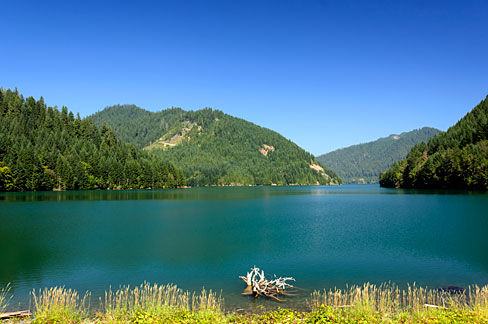

- Location within Oregon Location within the United States
- Location: Lane County, Oregon, about 42 miles (68 km) east of Springfield
- Coordinates: 44°10′19″N 122°19′49″W
- Type: Reservoir
- Primary inflows: Blue River
- Primary outflows: Blue River
- Catchment area: 88 mi^{2} (230 km^{2})
- Max. length: 6.4 mi (10.3 km)
- Surface area: 935 acres (378 ha), 1,420 acres (570 ha) when full
- Average depth: 91 ft (28 m)
- Max. depth: 248 ft (76 m)
- Water volume: 85,000 acre⋅ft (105,000,000 m^{3})
- Residence time: 3 months
- Shore length^{1}: 17 mi (27 km)
- Surface elevation: 1,350 ft (410 m)
- Settlements: Blue River, an unincorporated community
- ^{1} Shore length is not a well-defined measure.

Blue River Reservoir is an artificial impoundment, about 6 miles (10 km) long, of the Blue River in Lane County in the U.S. state of Oregon. The reservoir is about 1 mile (1.6 km) north of Oregon Route 126 in the Willamette National Forest about 45 miles (72 km) east of Eugene.

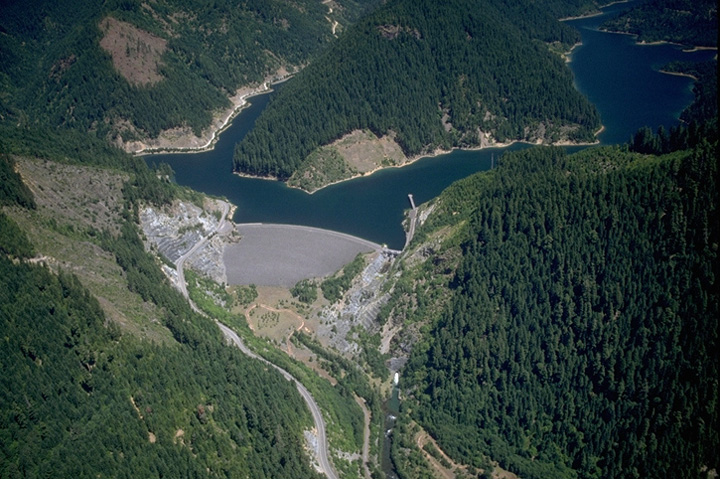
Blue River Dam

In 1968 the United States Army Corps of Engineers built Blue Lake Dam and Saddle Dam about 2 miles (3.2 km) from the mouth of the Blue River on the McKenzie River to create a reservoir for flood control and irrigation. Despite frequent blooms of blue-green algae, the lake is heavily used for recreation. Trout are the principal fish, supplemented from local hatcheries.

== Recreation ==
Blue River Reservoir is used for fishing, boating, swimming, and waterskiing. The United States Forest Service manages Mona Campground, on the north side of the reservoir, and Lookout Campground, on the northeast side. The Forest Service also manages two launching sites for motorized and non-motorized boats, one near Lookout Campground and the other near Saddle Dam on the south shore. The reservoir supports populations of native coastal cutthroat trout and stocked rainbow trout.

== See also ==
- List of lakes in Oregon
