= Willamette Greenway =

Public recreation area in Oregon, US

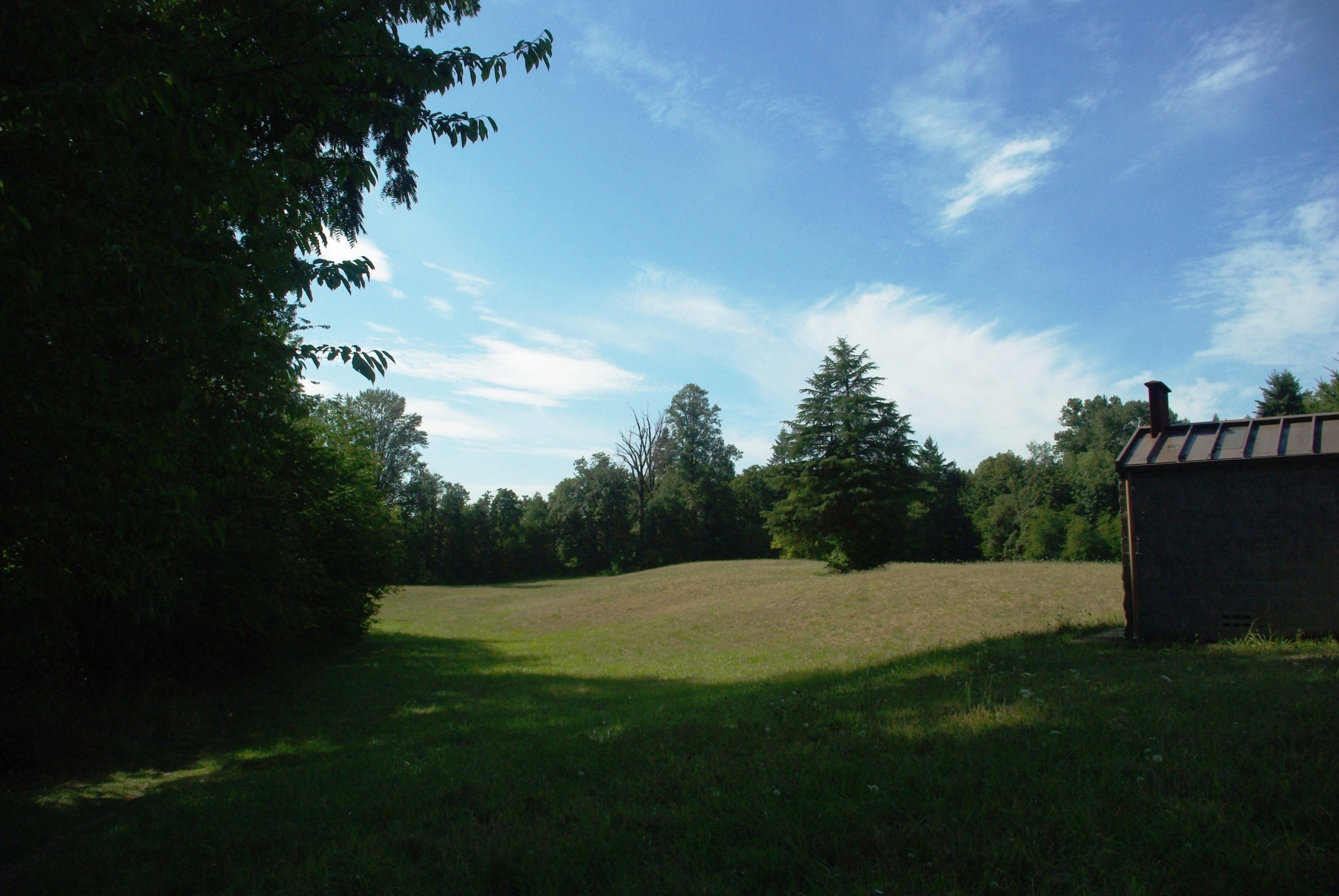
Part of the Greenway in Clackamas County west of Wilsonville at Parrett Mountain

The Willamette River Greenway is a cooperative state and local government effort to maintain and enhance the scenic, recreational, historic, natural and agricultural qualities of the Willamette River and its adjacent lands. A number of trails exist along the greenway, but significant gaps still exist.

During his 1966 run for Governor, Oregon State Treasurer Robert Straub proposed public ownership of lands along the Willamette. Tom McCall won the election and adopted the proposal. The Greenway was then established by the 1967 Oregon legislature and U.S. Senator Maurine Neuberger sought federal funds to support the program.

The 1973 Oregon legislature passed the Willamette River Greenway Act, which established ties to a comprehensive state land use law (Oregon Senate Bill 100) passed that same year.

In 1975, the Oregon Department of Land Conservation and Development included the Willamette River Greenway as one of nineteen standards for statewide planning, requiring that public access, native vegetation, and scenic views be considered when planning new developments.

== See also ==
- Land use in Oregon
- Tom McCall Waterfront Park – portion of the greenway in downtown Portland
- Vera Katz Eastbank Esplanade – more greenway near downtown Portland
- 40-Mile Loop – Willamette Greenway is one portion of extensive pathways throughout Portland
- Oregon Beach Bill – public access to ocean beaches was presumed early in Oregon's history, but asserted by law in 1966
