= Interstate 5 in Oregon =

Interstate highway in Oregon

Interstate 5
- National Purple Heart Trail; Korean War Veterans Memorial Highway
- Map of Western Oregon with I-5 highlighted in red

Route information
- Maintained by ODOT
- Length: 308.14 mi (495.90 km)
- Existed: August 14, 1957–present
- History: Completed in 1966
- NHS: Entire route

Major junctions
- South end: I-5 at California state line near Ashland
- US 199 in Grants Pass; I-105 / OR 126 in Eugene; OR 569 in Springfield; US 20 in Albany; OR 22 in Salem; I-205 in Tualatin; I-405 / US 26 in Portland; I-84 / US 30 in Portland; I-405 / US 30 in Portland
- North end: I-5 at Washington state line in Portland

Location
- Country: United States
- State: Oregon
- Counties: Jackson, Josephine, Douglas, Lane, Linn, Marion, Clackamas, Washington, Multnomah

Highway system
- Interstate Highway System; Main; Auxiliary; Suffixed; Business; Future; Oregon Highways; Interstate; US; State; Named; Scenic
← OR 3	→ OR 6

Interstate 5 (I-5) in the U.S. state of Oregon is a major Interstate Highway that traverses the state from north to south. It travels to the west of the Cascade Mountains, connecting Portland to Salem, Eugene, Medford, and other major cities in the Willamette Valley and across the northern Siskiyou Mountains. The highway runs 308 miles (496 km) from the California state line near Ashland to the Washington state line in northern Portland, forming the central part of Interstate 5's route between Mexico and Canada.

I-5 was designated in 1957 and replaced U.S. Route 99 (US 99) for most of its length, itself preceded by the Pacific Highway and various wagon roads. The freeway incorporated early bypasses and expressways built for US 99 in the 1950s, including a new freeway route from Portland to Salem, and additional bypasses were built using federal funds. The last segment of I-5, on the Marquam Bridge in Portland, was opened in October 1966 and the whole highway was dedicated later that month. The freeway remains parallel or concurrent to Oregon Route 99 (OR 99) and its spur routes, running along former segments of US 99 that were bypassed by I-5, from Ashland to Portland.

Under Oregon's named route system, all of I-5 is designated as Pacific Highway No. 1. The Salem–Portland section was named the Baldock Freeway until 2022. The freeway also has three signed auxiliary routes that function as spurs and bypasses of major cities: I-105 in Eugene, I-205 in eastern Portland, I-405 in downtown Portland. Two additional auxiliary routes were planned in the early years of the Interstate system, but were shelved after local opposition.

== Route description ==
Interstate 5 is the second-longest freeway in Oregon, at 308 miles (496 km), and is the only Interstate to traverse the state from north to south. The highway connects several of the state's largest metropolitan areas, which lie in the Rogue and Willamette valleys, and passes through counties with approximately 81 percent of Oregon's population. As a component of the Interstate Highway System, I-5 is also designated as an important highway under the National Highway System. It is officially designated under Oregon's named route system as the Pacific Highway No. 1, a name shared with Oregon Route 99 (OR 99) and its split routes north of Junction City. OR 99 runs concurrent to I-5 through most of southern Oregon, splitting from the freeway to serve city centers and use other alternate routes, while OR 99W and OR 99E serve corridors on opposite sides of the Willamette River. The state legislature also designated I-5 as the Purple Heart Trail and Korean War Veterans Memorial Highway in 2015.

I-5 is maintained by the Oregon Department of Transportation (ODOT), who conduct an annual survey of traffic volume that is expressed in terms of annual average daily traffic (AADT), a measure of traffic volume for any average day of the year. The highway's busiest section is near Durham between junctions with I-205 and OR 217, carrying an average of 164,000 vehicles daily in 2017. The least-traveled section of I-5 is located near Ashland and carries only around 16,600 vehicles daily.

=== California to Eugene ===
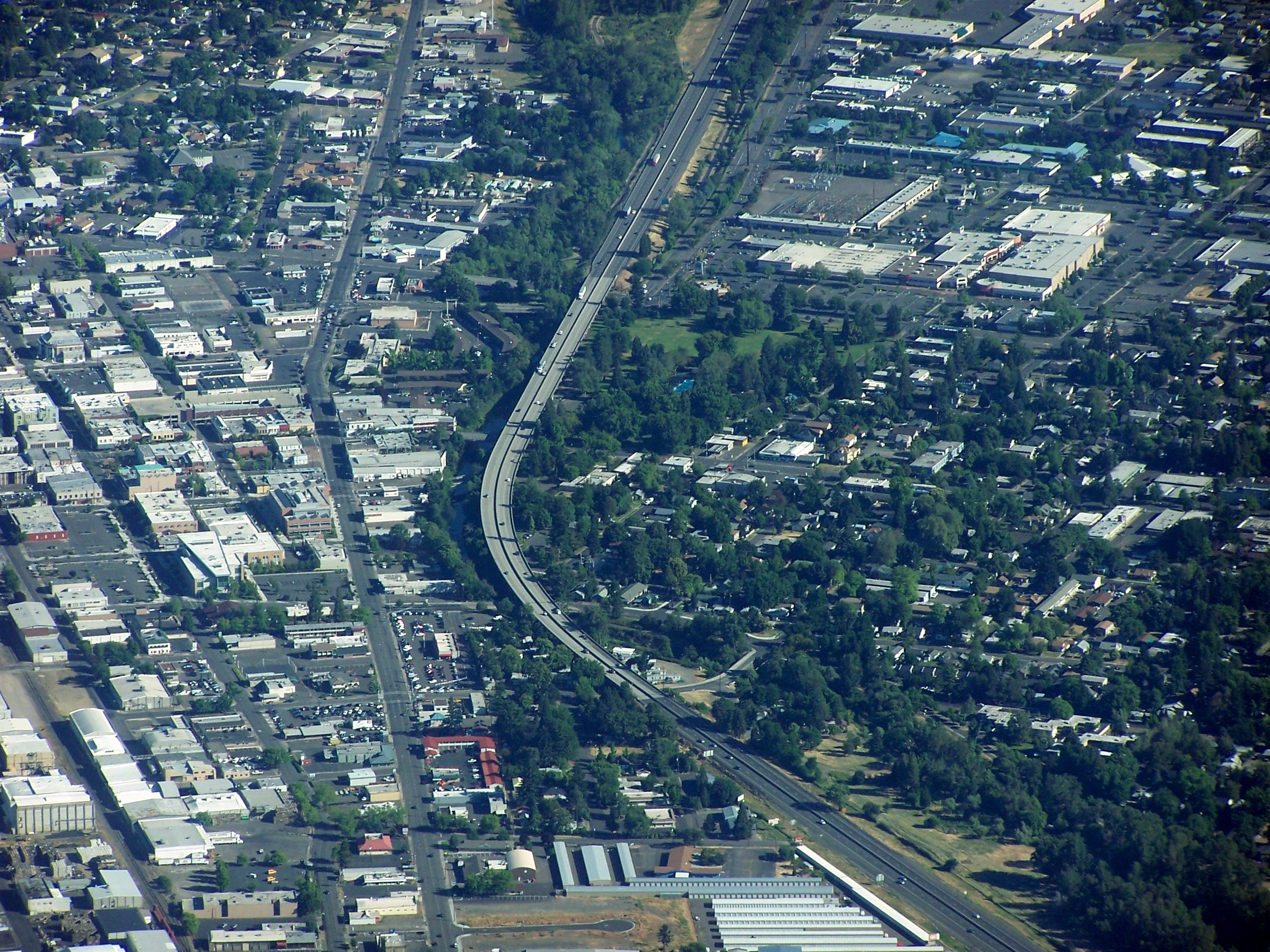
Aerial view of Interstate 5 in downtown Medford, where it travels on an elevated viaduct

I-5 enters Oregon at the California state line in southern Jackson County. The highway travels northeast along a ridge in the Siskiyou Mountains, with a maximum grade of 6 percent, to Siskiyou Summit; at 4,310 feet (1,310 m), it is the highest point on all of I-5 and one of the highest points on the Interstate system. The mountainous, 11-mile (18 km) section of the freeway runs along Siskiyou Pass and includes several runaway truck ramps and chain-up areas due to its heavy use by trucks and its foggy and snowy conditions in winter. North of the summit, the freeway intersects the Old Siskiyou Highway (OR 273) and the Pacific Crest Trail before it travels out of the Rogue River–Siskiyou National Forest.

The highway descends from the mountains into the Rogue Valley and intersects the south end of OR 99 west of Emigrant Lake, adjacent to a railroad underpass. I-5 follows OR 99 and passes a rest area and welcome center before entering the city of Ashland. The freeway crosses OR 66 west of the city's municipal airport and follows Bear Creek around the north side of downtown Ashland. I-5 and OR 99 run parallel each other on opposite sides of Bear Creek through Talent and Phoenix to Medford, at the center of the Rogue Valley and its winery region. The freeway runs through downtown Medford on a 3,229-foot (984 m) elevated viaduct with no exits to the city center. It then intersects OR 62 at the Rogue Valley Mall, providing access to Crater Lake and Mount McLoughlin northeast of the valley. The freeway continues northwest, passing Rogue Valley International–Medford Airport and the suburb of Central Point before turning west to follow the Rogue River.

I-5 follows the Rogue River downstream through a narrow valley, where OR 99 and a railroad cross over and under the freeway several times, and passes Valley of the Rogue State Park. It also passes the Oregon Vortex, a popular roadside attraction near Gold Hill. At the west end of the valley in Josephine County, the freeway reaches Grants Pass and intersects U.S. Route 199 (US 199), which connects to Crescent City, California, on the Pacific Coast. The freeway continues along the northeast edge of Grants Pass and becomes concurrent with OR 99 at an interchange north of the city. I-5 splits from the Rogue River and continues north along a zig-zag course across several passes and valleys in the Southern Oregon Coast Range. At Wolf Creek, it passes a historic inn and tavern that is listed on the National Register of Historic Places. The freeway crosses into Douglas County near Stage Road Pass east of Glendale and turns northeast to follow the Cow Creek valley before resuming its northern course through the mountains. After descending from Canyon Creek Pass and following Canyon Creek, I-5 reaches Canyonville and passes the Seven Feathers Casino Resort. The freeway follows the South Umpqua River through Myrtle Creek and the Cow Creek Reservation, with OR 99 splitting to serve Winston. I-5 intersects OR 42 east of Winston in Green and continues north into the outskirts of Roseburg.

Within Roseburg, the freeway runs along the west bank of the South Umpqua River opposite from the city's downtown and passes through several residential neighborhoods near the regional airport. At Harvard Avenue, I-5 begins a concurrency with OR 138 that continues for 12 miles (19 km) to Sutherlin, running parallel to OR 99 as the highways cross the North Umpqua River. OR 99 rejoins I-5 between Oakland and Yoncalla in the Cabin Creek canyon, but splits off again to serve the Pass Creek valley while I-5 remains in the Pleasant Valley. The two highways are rejoined at Anlauf and continue northeast along Pass Creek towards Cottage Grove in Lane County. The freeway runs through the eastern outskirts of Cottage Grove and continues north along the Coast Fork Willamette River into the Willamette Valley, trading the mountainous terrain of southern Oregon for rolling hills and farms. At Goshen, I-5 intersects OR 58 and passes the Lane Community College campus before entering Eugene.

=== Eugene to Wilsonville ===
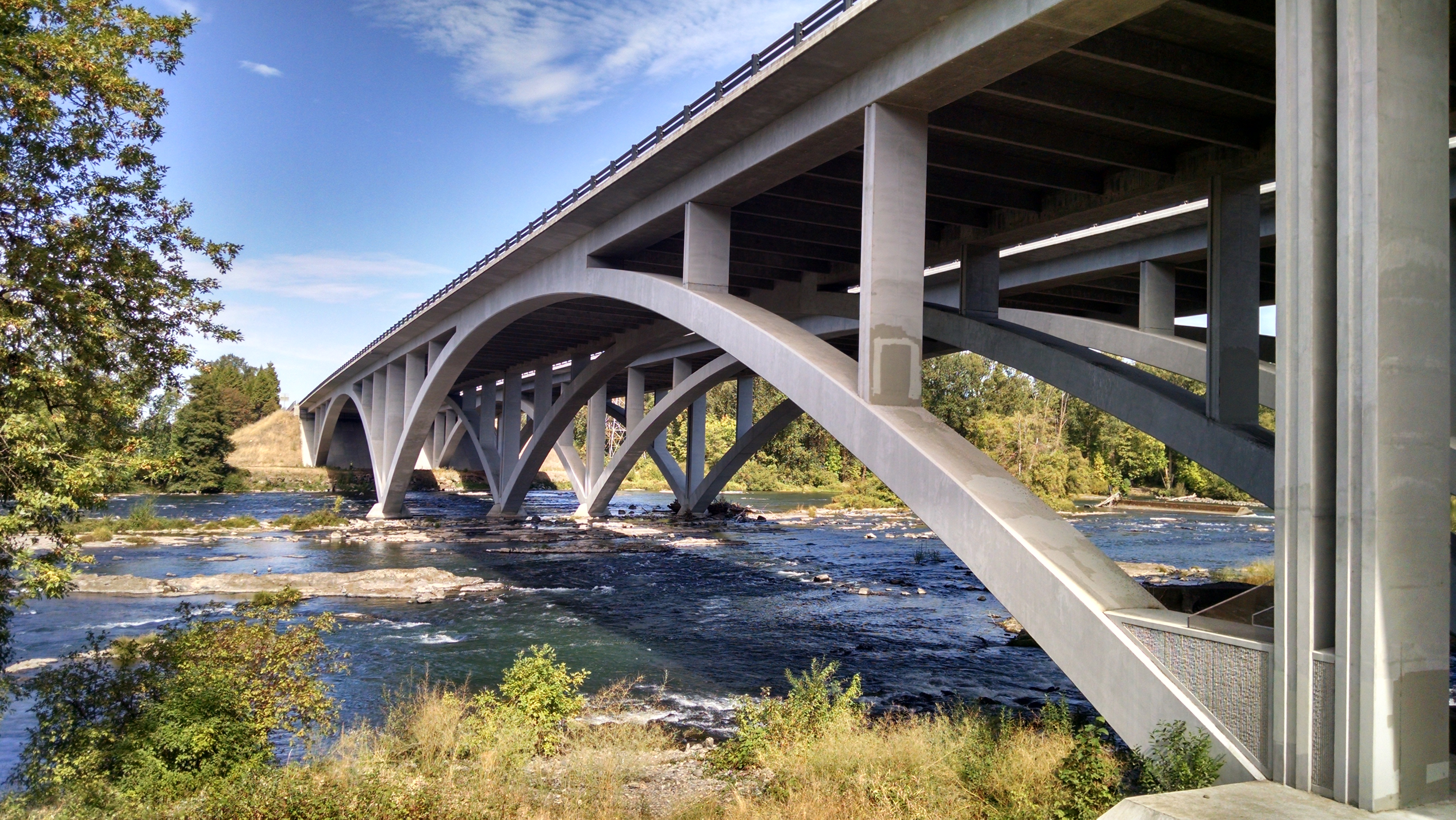
The Whilamut Passage Bridge, a pair of arch bridges that carry I-5 over the Willamette River in Eugene

I-5 continues north into Eugene, running along the city's eastern border with Springfield, and intersects OR 225 at Coryell Pass. OR 99 then splits from the freeway and travels west along OR 126 Business into downtown Eugene, serving the University of Oregon campus, and continues north to Junction City, where it splits into OR 99W and OR 99E. The freeway then travels over the Whilamut Passage Bridge, a pair of concrete arch bridges that span 1,985 feet (605 m) across the Willamette River west of downtown Springfield. On the north side of the river near the Gateway Mall, it intersects I-105, providing freeway access to downtown Eugene, and OR 126. At the north end of Eugene, intersects Beltline Road in a partial cloverleaf interchange with direct ramps to the western freeway, which carries OR 569 around Eugene.

The freeway leaves Eugene after crossing the McKenzie River at Armitage Park south of Coburg. I-5 continues north along OR 99E through rural Linn County, intersecting OR 228 near Brownsville and OR 34 west of Lebanon, before the two highways reach Albany. The freeway skirts the east side of the city, where it intersects US 20, and begins a concurrency with OR 99E. I-5 and OR 99E then intersect the south and north ends of OR 164 near Millersburg and the Ankeny National Wildlife Refuge. The freeway continues northeast and passes the Enchanted Forest amusement park and several wineries before reaching the southern outskirts of Salem.

The freeway travels around McNary Field and intersects OR 22 at Mission Street, near the Corban University campus southeast of downtown Salem. I-5 and OR 99E continue north through suburban Salem, passing the Oregon State Penitentiary and Oregon State Hospital campus, which is located two miles (3.2 km) east of the Oregon State Capitol and Willamette University. Between the Willamette Town Center shopping mall and the Oregon State Fairgrounds, the freeway intersects the south end of OR 213, a local highway that parallels I-5 to the east towards the Portland area. OR 99E splits from I-5 at an interchange with Portland Road, located west of the Chemeketa Community College campus in Hayesville. The freeway continues northwest into Keizer and intersects Salem Parkway, a divided highway carrying OR 99E Business, at an interchange that straddles the 45th parallel (marked with a sign in the median).

I-5 continues northeast from the interchange, passing the Keizer Station complex and the minor-league Volcanoes Stadium before leaving the suburban fringes of Keizer. The freeway continues north entering the French Prairie region of the Willamette Valley along OR 99E and the former Oregon Electric Railway, passing the Powerland Heritage Park and Oregon Electric Railway Museum near Brooks. At the Woodburn Premium Outlets mall west of Woodburn, I-5 intersects the dual termini of OR 214 and OR 219, which provide access to Silverton and Newberg, respectively. It reaches a junction with OR 551 north of Aurora State Airport and adjacent to the French Prairie rest area, which includes a seven-acre (2.8 ha) solar power array with 7,000 panels. North of the interchange, I-5 crosses the Willamette River on the Boone Bridge and enters the city of Wilsonville, at the edge of the Portland metropolitan area.

=== Portland area ===
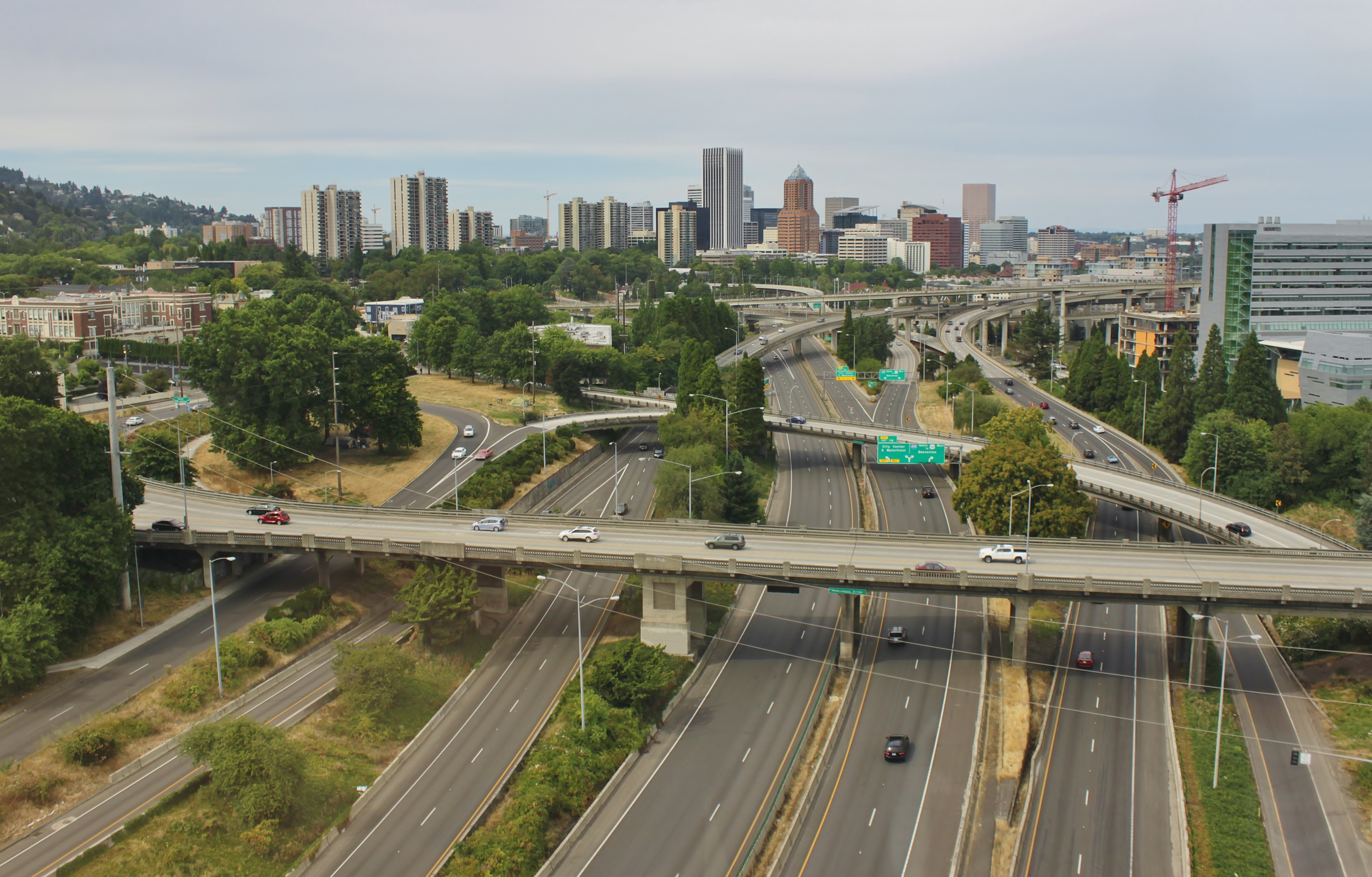
Aerial view of Interstate 5 at its interchange with I-405 in Downtown Portland, as seen from the Portland Aerial Tram.

The highway bisects downtown Wilsonville and its adjacent suburban neighborhoods, continuing north along the WES Commuter Rail line into Tualatin. On the south side of the city, I-5 intersects the south end of I-205, a bypass of Portland serving Oregon City and eastern Portland. The freeway crosses over the Tualatin River into Durham, where it passes the Bridgeport Village shopping center, before entering Tigard and an intersection with OR 217, a major freeway that connects to Beaverton. I-5 then enters Multnomah County and the city of Portland, where it travels around Mount Sylvania and through a meandering course along Barbur Boulevard (part of OR 99W) across several hilltops. In the South Burlingame neighborhood, the freeway begins a fishhook-shaped turn through the "Terwilliger curves", a notoriously dangerous section of I-5 that changes directions five times in one mile (1.6 km). The area averaged about 100 collisions and crashes per year between 1995 and 2005.

I-5 continues north from the Terwilliger curves through South Portland, running uphill from OR 43 on the western bank of the Willamette River and downhill from Barbur Boulevard (now carrying OR 10 and OR 99W). The freeway dives northeasterly towards the South Waterfront district to avoid Marquam Hill, home of the Oregon Health & Science University campus. The lanes of OR 43 are split between Hood and Macadam avenues on west and east sides of I-5 as it crosses under the Portland Aerial Tram and Gibbs Street Pedestrian Bridge. The freeway passes under the Ross Island Bridge (part of US 26) and reaches the southern terminus of I-405, which it intersects in a large Y interchange situated over the light rail tracks of the MAX Orange Line and the Portland Streetcar.

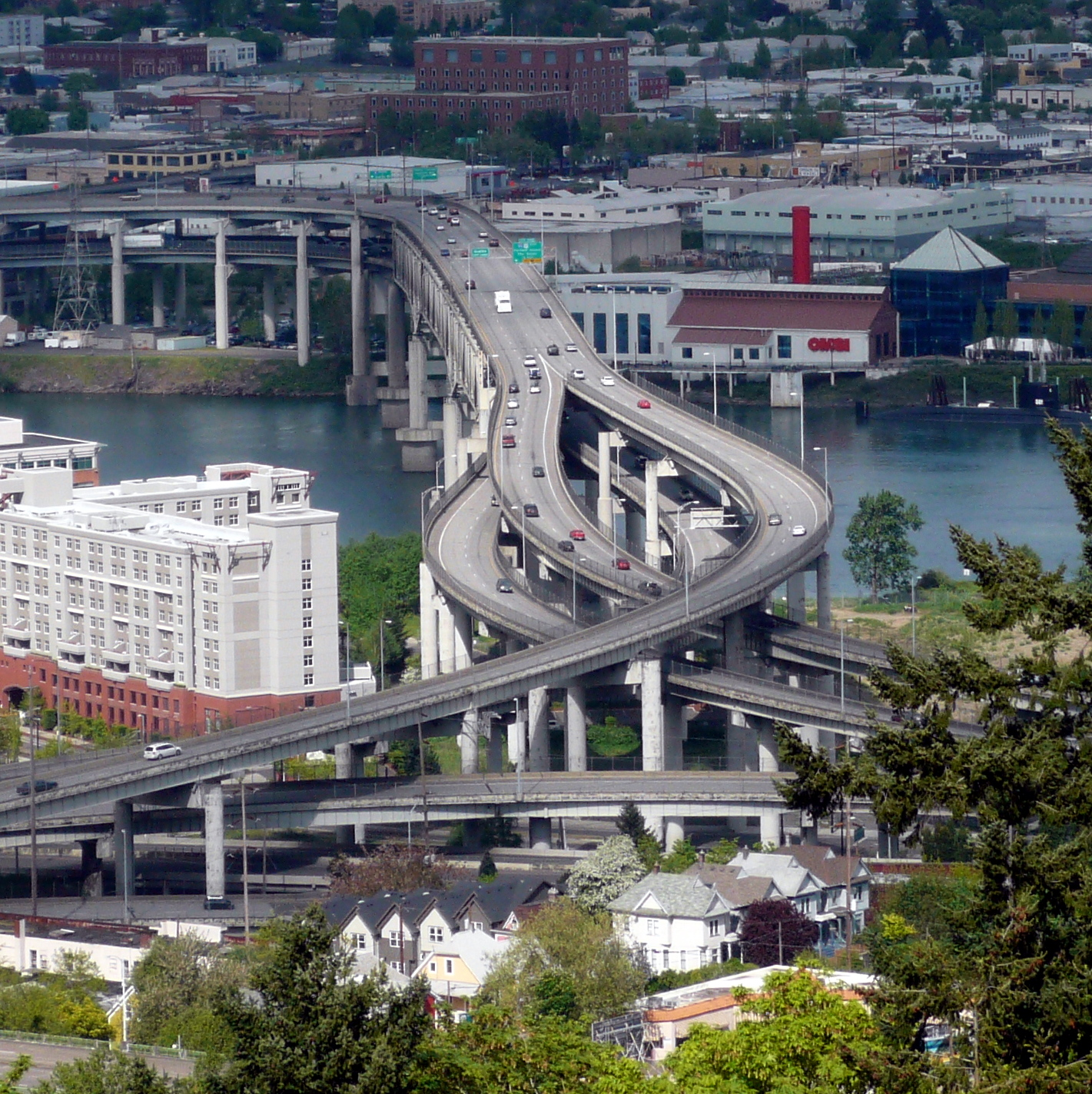
I-5 crosses the Willamette River on the Marquam Bridge, connecting two sides of Portland

From the interchange, I-405 passes through the western part of Downtown Portland and Harbor Drive continues into downtown along the Willamette River waterfront. I-5 continues northeast over the Willamette River on the double-decked Marquam Bridge, with its northbound lanes on the upper deck and southbound lanes carried on the lower deck. The bridge is the busiest crossing in Oregon, with over 140,000 daily vehicles traveling across it, and runs parallel to the Tilikum Crossing transit bridge and Ross Island Bridge. The east end of the bridge, adjacent to the Oregon Museum of Science and Industry, has a southbound stub ramp that was built to serve the cancelled Mount Hood Freeway. I-5 descends from the bridge and runs north along the Willamette River, following the eastern bank of the river and the Eastbank Esplanade bicycle and pedestrian trail a few blocks west of OR 99E. The freeway crosses over the east end of the Hawthorne Bridge and under the Morrison Bridge, intersecting the latter to provide direct access to Downtown Portland.

After passing under the Burnside Bridge, I-5 intersects the western terminus of I-84, Oregon's lone east–west freeway and the main route through the Columbia River Gorge. After the interchange, US 30 joins I-5 in a short concurrency while the freeway travels around major landmarks in the Rose Quarter, including the Oregon Convention Center, the Moda Center, and the Veterans Memorial Coliseum. At Northeast Holladay Street, the highway passes directly over the MAX Light Rail platforms of the Rose Quarter Transit Center just east of the Steel Bridge, which carries four MAX lines and OR 99W into Downtown Portland. I-5 veers northwest and briefly into a sunken section near the Broadway Bridge, which carries the Portland Streetcar's loop lines. Between the Boise and Eliot neighborhoods, the freeway intersects the terminating I-405 a short distance from the Fremont Bridge, which carries US 30 west into the Pearl District after it splits from I-5. The interchange, located between the Legacy Emanuel Medical Center and Albina railyard, has a set of three stub ramps that were built for the cancelled Rose City Freeway and were re-purposed to serve the hospital.

Through most of North Portland, I-5 runs in a trench that is crossed by several local streets and pedestrian overpasses, connecting Interstate Avenue to the west and Albina Avenue to the east. Interstate Avenue, a part of OR 99W, also carries the MAX Yellow Line through the Overlook, Arbor Lodge, and Kenton neighborhoods. At an interchange with Going Street, the freeway's northbound lanes gain the city's lone high-occupancy vehicle (HOV) lane, which runs for 3.5 miles (5.6 km) to the north end of Delta Park. I-5 continues north and passes Peninsula Park and the Cascade campus of the Portland Community College in the Piedmont neighborhood before reaching an interchange with Lombard Street, which carries the US 30 Bypass. From the Lombard Street interchange, the freeway turns northwest and crosses over the Columbia Slough, reaching Delta Park on the site of the former city of Vanport. The area also includes the Portland International Raceway and Portland Meadows horse racing track, along with several sports fields. At the north end of Delta Park, I-5 intersects the north end of OR 99E and the east end of OR 120, a short local route connecting to the Portland Expo Center (where the MAX Yellow Line terminates) and St. Johns. The freeway continues north onto Hayden Island, where a single exit serves the entire island, and crosses over the Columbia River on the Interstate Bridge into Vancouver, Washington. The Interstate Bridge carries a daily average of 132,000 vehicles and consists of two bridges that lift vertically for river traffic.

== History ==
=== Predecessor trails and highways ===
I-5 roughly follows the Siskiyou Trail, an early trading route used by indigenous Oregonians and early trappers between the Willamette Valley and California. The trail was re-purposed as a settler's route in 1846, following the creation of the Applegate Trail by the territorial government. It was later incorporated into the early roads of the Willamette Valley, but remained secondary to waterborne transportation along the river and railroads built in the late 19th century. The rising popularity of automobiles at the turn of the century spurred the construction of new highways and the formation of automobile clubs and good roads associations.

The Pacific Highway Association was formed in 1910 to bolster an ongoing campaign to build a highway along the West Coast, from Tijuana to Vancouver, British Columbia. The highway was incorporated into a state highway plan adopted by the Oregon State Highway Commission in 1914, a year after the state legislature had established the commission and a state highway department. The first sections of the 345-mile (555 km) Pacific Highway were initially built by counties through bond issues and other revenue streams. Jackson County was the first to begin construction on its section of the highway, breaking ground on a link between Siskiyou Summit and Medford on November 28, 1913. These early sections were built using compacted dirt, which turned into mud in inclement weather and rendered them impassible. The state government enacted its own revenue sources for highway construction at the end of the decade, including the first state gas tax to be levied in the United States. The Pacific Highway was completed in 1922 and was the first highway to be completely paved from border to border within a state west of the Mississippi River.

=== Freeway construction ===
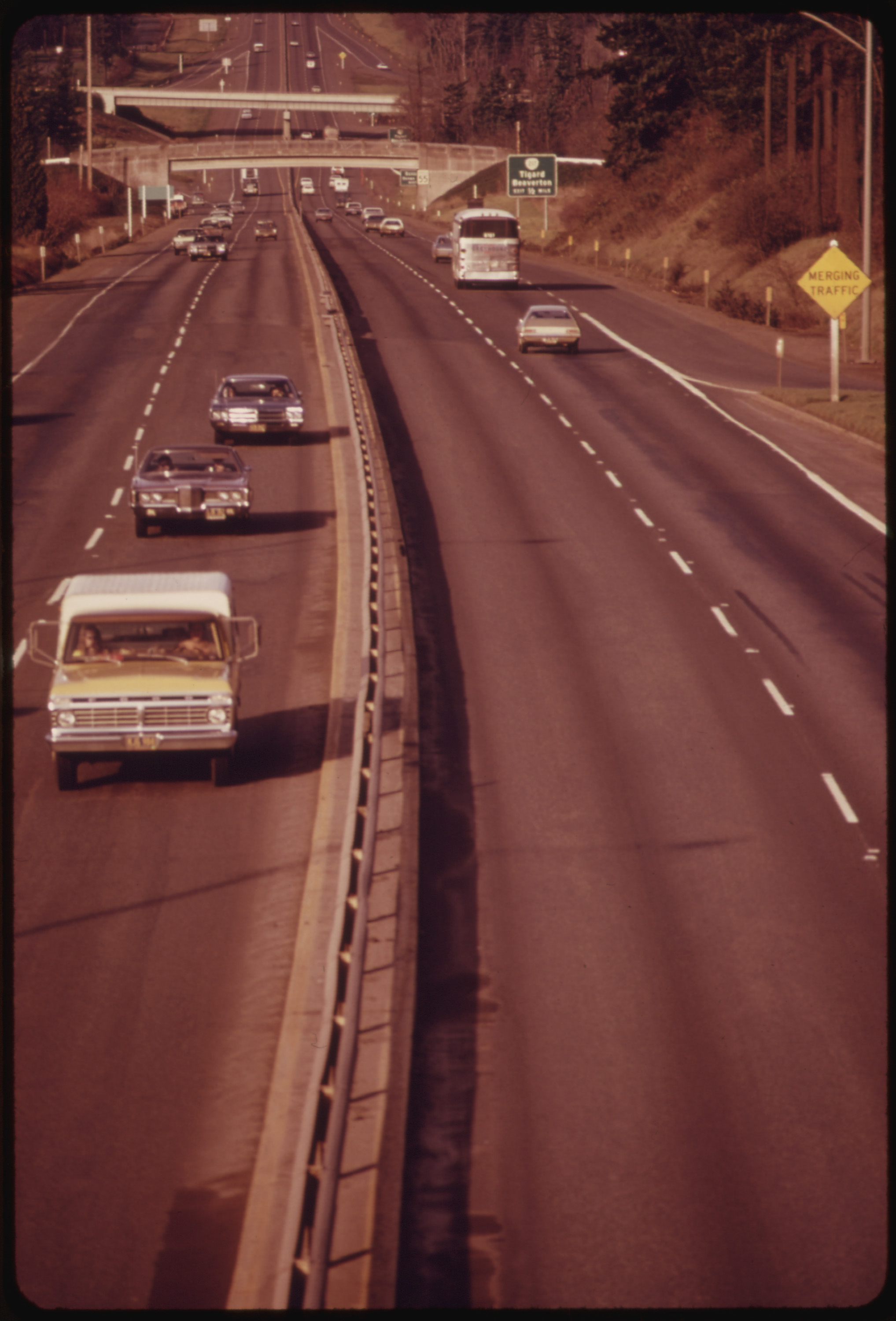
I-5 near Tigard, photographed in 1973 prior to later expansion

The Oregon state legislature authorized the construction of controlled-access "throughways" (now called freeways) in 1947 and the Pacific Highway was designated as a future corridor the following year. A six-cent gas tax increase was approved by the legislature in 1949 and would be used to improve sections of US 99 to freeway standards. It was later augmented by federal funding under the Interstate Highways program. The State Highway Commission studied and approved the routing of I-5 around several cities in the late 1950s, including an elevated bypass of Medford.

Although not generally referred as such, the portion of I-5 south of Portland near Tigard to Salem was formerly named the Robert Hugh Baldock Freeway after a former Oregon highway engineer. In 2022, the name was removed from state records following the discovery of his membership in the Ku Klux Klan. Early proposals by engineers put the southern section of I-5 further east through Klamath Falls and the flatter Klamath Basin, but the Siskiyou Pass route was favored by local politicians. Most of the highway in the Pacific Northwest was incorporated into U.S. Route 99 (US 99), created as part of a national highway system in 1926. The Oregon section was divided between Junction City and Portland into US 99W and US 99E, with the latter taking the original route of the Pacific Highway. It was completed on December 1, 1961, with direct connections to Harbor Drive in Downtown Portland.

The first modern rest area in Oregon was opened in 1962 between Eugene and Albany; within four years, eight more sets were completed. The first section of the East Bank Freeway in Portland, running 2.5 miles (4.0 km) from the Morrison Bridge to Shaver and Failing streets, opened to traffic on January 7, 1964. The Marquam Bridge, which connected the completed portions of I-5 to the East Bank Freeway, opened to southbound traffic on October 4, 1966, and northbound traffic two weeks later. Its design was criticized by the public and the Portland Art Commission, who described it as "so gross, so lacking in grace, so utterly inconsistent with any concept of aesthetics" in a formal complaint.

The final section of Interstate 5 was dedicated on October 22, 1966, at the Cow Creek rest area. At the time, the freeway had 114 interchanges and 467 bridge structures; it cost an estimated $298 million to construct.

=== Later history ===
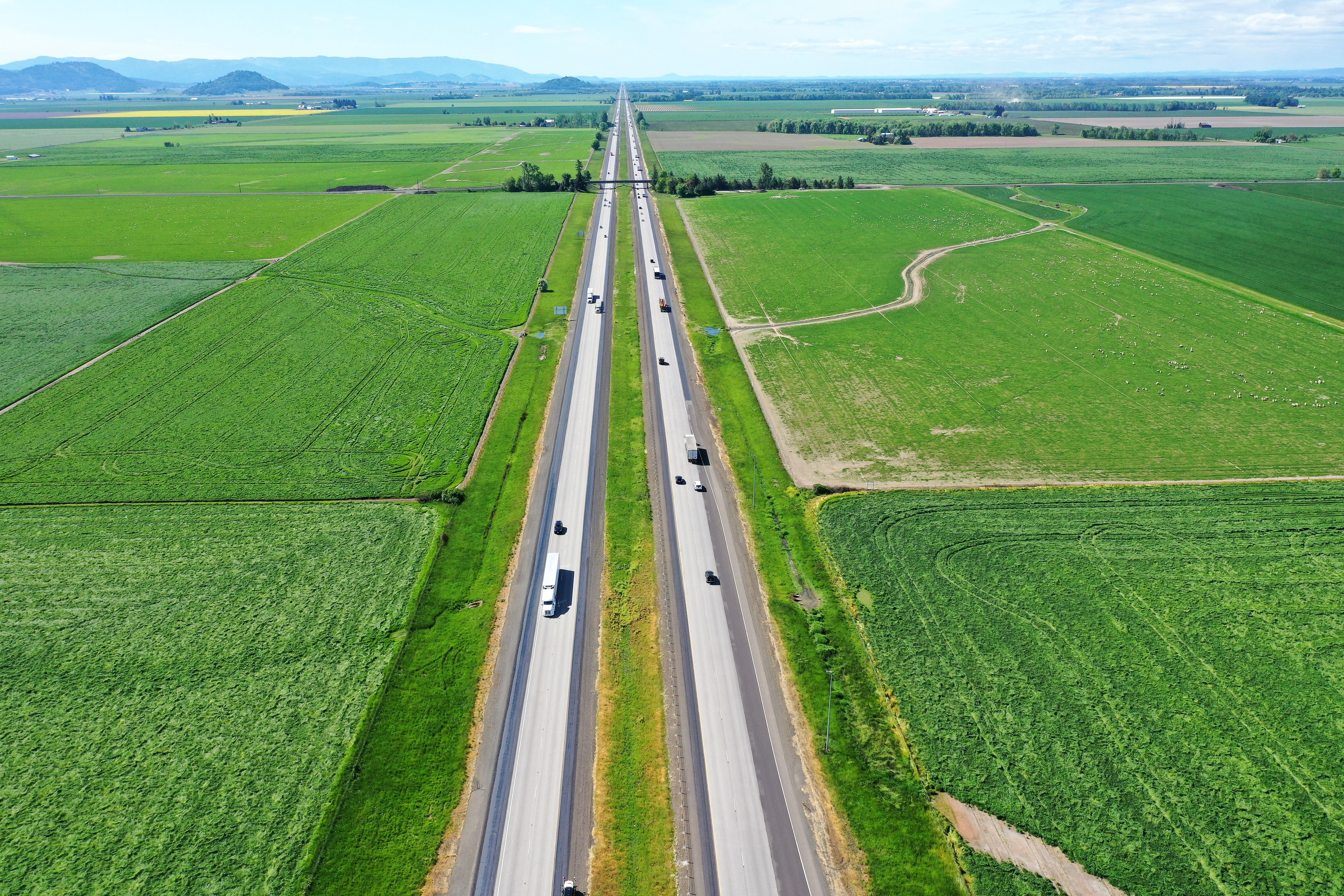
Aerial view of I-5 near Albany

The Salem–Portland section of I-5 was widened to six lanes in the late 1970s and early 1980s. Beginning in 1976, the State Highway Division (now ODOT) experimented with asphalt recycling from construction projects on the I-5 corridor to repave local roads.

The Albany–Salem section was renamed the Atomic Veterans Memorial Highway by the Oregon Legislative Assembly in August 2017. In 2022, ODOT completed an emergency onramp at Mountain Avenue in Ashland to aid in evacuations in the event of a wildfire. The gravel ramp is controlled by a locked gate and was approved for construction following the 2020 Almeda fire, which started in the area and destroyed 2,500 homes.

=== Future projects ===
The states of Oregon and Washington began planning of a replacement for the twin spans of the Interstate Bridge in the late 1990s to address regional congestion and disruptions due to the lift span. The Columbia River Crossing program was established in 2004 to design a replacement, which was to be 17 lanes wide over Hayden Island and cost up to $3.5 billion. The program was cancelled in 2013 due to opposition within the Washington state legislature; $200 million had been spent during planning, which included federal funds that would need to be reimbursed unless a new proposal was submitted. A new program, named the Interstate Bridge Replacement, began in 2019 and is expected to publish an environmental impact statement in 2023. The updated design includes an eight-lane toll bridge with no movable span, a multi-use trail for cyclists and pedestrians, and a MAX Light Rail extension into Vancouver. The project's environmental impact statement was completed in 2026 and is expected to begin construction in 2027 alongside tolling of the existing bridge. The bridge replacement and light rail extension are estimated to cost $7.65 billion, while the entire project—which comprises 5 miles (8.0 km) of freeway expanison and interchange replacements—is expectedd to cost up to $15.2 billion.

In 2017, ODOT began planning an expansion of I-5 through the Rose Quarter to address congestion and safety issues on a 1.8-mile (2.9 km) section between I-84 and I-405. The agency's proposal—the addition of an auxiliary lane for merging and weaving traffic, as well as a freeway lid—would cost $450 million and was approved by the state legislature that year. The project attracted opposition and protests as it went through several years of environmental review and design revisions, during which the estimated cost grew to $715 million by 2020. In June 2020, several elected officials from the city and county governments announced that they would not support the proposal, following a local nonprofit advocacy group from the Albina neighborhood that did the same. A new design with larger freeway lids and potential for development, estimated to cost $1.25 billion, was adopted by ODOT in September 2021; the city government later returned to the project, which was expected to begin construction in 2025. By June 2023, the estimated cost had risen to $1.9 billion and ODOT delayed work on the project for an indefinite period of time. The Oregon Transportation Commission voted to approve Phase 1A construction, which consists of extending the southbound auxiliary lane from I-84 to the Morrison Bridge, in July 2025. The full project faces a $1.5 billion funding gap.

== Exit list ==
County	Location	mi	km	Exit	Destinations	Notes
Jackson		0.00	0.00	—	I-5 south – Yreka, Redding	Continuation into California
Jackson		0.74	1.19	1	Siskiyou Summit	Northbound exit and southbound entrance; unsigned OR 273
Jackson		4.30	6.92	Siskiyou Summit, elevation 4,310 feet (1,310 m)		
Jackson		5.36	8.63	6	Mount Ashland	Unsigned OR 273
Jackson		11.62	18.70	11	OR 99 north (Siskiyou Boulevard) – Ashland	Northbound exit and southbound entrance
Jackson	Ashland	14.20	22.85	14	OR 66 – Ashland, Klamath Falls	
Jackson		19.14	30.80	19	Valley View Road – Ashland	Valley View Road only appears on northbound signage
Jackson	Talent	21.22	34.15	21	Talent	
Jackson	Phoenix	24.42	39.30	24	Phoenix	
Jackson	Medford	27.24	43.84	27	To OR 99 – South Medford	
Jackson	Medford	30.32	48.80	30	OR 62 east (Crater Lake Highway) to OR 238 – North Medford, Crater Lake	Northbound exit and entrance
Jackson	Medford	30.32	48.80	30	OR 62 east (Crater Lake Highway) – Medford, Klamath Falls	Southbound exit and entrance
Jackson	Central Point	32.78	52.75	33	Central Point, Eagle Point	
Jackson		35.51	57.15	35	OR 99 south / OR 140 east / Blackwell Road – Central Point	
Jackson		40.86	65.76	40	OR 99 (Rogue-Umpqua Scenic Byway / Blackwell Road) to OR 234	Northbound exit and entrance
Jackson		40.86	65.76	40	Gold Hill	Southbound exit and entrance
Jackson		43.80	70.49	43	To OR 99 (Rogue River Route) / OR 234 – Gold Hill, Crater Lake	OR 234, Gold Hill, and Crater Lake only appear on southbound signage
Jackson		45.48	73.19	45A	OR 99 (Rogue River Route)	
Jackson		45.75– 46.08	73.63– 74.16	45B	Valley of the Rogue State Park	
Jackson	Rogue River	48.85	78.62	48	City of Rogue River	
Josephine	Grants Pass	55.81	89.82	55	US 199 south (Redwood Highway) – South Grants Pass, Crescent City	
Josephine	Grants Pass	57.96– 58.34	93.28– 93.89	58	OR 99 south to US 199 (Redwood Highway) – Grants Pass City Center	South end of OR 99 concurrency
Josephine		61.47	98.93	61	Merlin	
Josephine		66.31	106.72	66	Hugo	
Josephine		69.11	111.22	Sexton Mountain Pass summit, elevation 1,960 feet (600 m)		
Josephine		71.42	114.94	71	Sunny Valley	
Josephine		73.84	118.83	Smith Hill summit, elevation 1,730 feet (530 m)		
Josephine	Wolf Creek	75.82– 76.78	122.02– 123.57	76	Wolf Creek	
Josephine		78.46	126.27	78	Speaker Road	Southbound exit and northbound entrance
Josephine		79.81	128.44	Stage Road Pass summit, elevation 1,830 feet (560 m)		
Douglas		80.79	130.02	80	Glendale	
Douglas		83.28	134.03	83	Barton Road	Northbound exit and southbound entrance
Douglas	Quines Creek	86.13	138.61	86	Quines Creek Road / Barton Road	Barton Road only appears on southbound signage
Douglas		88.12	141.82	88	Azalea, Galesville Reservoir	
Douglas		90.19	145.15	Canyon Creek Pass summit, elevation 2,020 feet (620 m)		
Douglas		95.81	154.19	95	Canyon Creek	
Douglas	Canyonville	98.27	158.15	98	Canyonville, Days Creek	
Douglas		99.51	160.15	99	North Canyonville, Stanton Park (northbound), Crater Lake (southbound)	
Douglas		101.05– 101.39	162.62– 163.17	101	Riddle, Stanton Park	Stanton Park only appears on southbound signage
Douglas		101.89	163.98	102	Gazley Road	
Douglas	Tri-City	103.94	167.28	103	Tri-City, Riddle	
Douglas	Myrtle Creek	106.70	171.72	106	Tri-City, Myrtle Creek	Northbound signage
Douglas	Myrtle Creek	106.70	171.72	106	Weaver Road	Southbound signage
Douglas	Myrtle Creek	107.98– 108.47	173.78– 174.57	108	Myrtle Creek	
Douglas		110.35	177.59	110	Boomer Hill Road	
Douglas		112.12– 112.48	180.44– 181.02	112	OR 99 north to OR 42 west – Dillard, Coos Bay, Winston	OR 99 and OR 42 only appear on northbound signage; Winston only appears on southbound signage; northern end of concurrency with OR 99
Douglas		113.43	182.55	113	Clarks Branch Road – Round Prairie	
Douglas		116.42	187.36	Roberts Mountain summit, elevation 956 feet (291 m)		
Douglas	Green	119.50	192.32	119	OR 42 west to OR 99 – Winston, Coos Bay	
Douglas		120.48	193.89	120	OR 99 north – South Roseburg	Northbound exit only
Douglas		120.48	193.89	120	Green District, Roseburg	Southbound exit and entrance
Douglas		121.68	195.82	121	McLain Avenue	
Douglas		123.00	197.95	123	Douglas County Fairgrounds, Umpqua Park	
Douglas	Roseburg	124.13	199.77	124	OR 138 east – Roseburg City Center, Diamond Lake	Southern end of concurrency with OR 138
Douglas	Roseburg	125.07	201.28	125	Garden Valley Boulevard – Roseburg	
Douglas	Roseburg	126.51	203.60	127	Edenbower Boulevard – North Roseburg	
Douglas		129.45	208.33	129	Winchester	Northbound signage
Douglas		129.45	208.33	129	Wilbur	Southbound signage
Douglas	Sutherlin	135.13	217.47	135	Sutherlin, Wilbur	
Douglas	Sutherlin	136.51	219.69	136	OR 138 west – Sutherlin, Elkton	Northern end of concurrency with OR 138
Douglas		138.29	222.56	138	Oakland	Northbound exit and southbound entrance
Douglas		140.53	226.16	140	OR 99 south – Oakland	Southern end of concurrency with OR 99; southbound exit and northbound entrance
Douglas		142.17	228.80	142	Metz Hill	
Douglas		142.31	229.03	Rice Hill summit, elevation 723 feet (220 m)		
Douglas		146.24	235.35	146	Rice Valley	
Douglas	Rice Hill	148.40– 149.59	238.83– 240.74	148	Rice Hill	
Douglas		150.32	241.92	150	OR 99 north to OR 38 – Yoncalla, Drain	North end of OR 99 concurrenmcy
Douglas		154.36– 154.95	248.42– 249.37	154	Scotts Valley, Elkhead	
Douglas		159.27	256.32	159	Cox Road – Elk Creek	
Douglas		160.13	257.70	160	Salt Springs Road	
Douglas		161.70	260.23	161	Anlauf, Lorane	Northbound exit only
Douglas		162.35	261.28	162	OR 38 west / OR 99 south – Drain, Elkton	Southern end of concurrency with OR 99
Douglas		163.43	263.02	163	Curtin, Lorane	
Lane		168.36	270.95	170	OR 99 north – Cottage Grove	Northern end of concurrency with OR 99; northbound exit and southbound entrance
Lane		172.23	277.18	172	Sixth Street – Cottage Grove Lake	Southbound exit and northbound entrance
Lane	Cottage Grove	174.73	281.20	174	Cottage Grove, Dorena Lake	
Lane		176.75	284.45	176	Saginaw	
Lane	Creswell	182.82	294.22	182	OR 222 – Creswell	
Lane		186.42	300.01	186	Dillard Road – Goshen	Northbound exit only
Lane		188.33	303.09	188A	OR 58 east (Willamette Highway) – Oakridge, Klamath Falls	Signed as Exit 188 southbound; OR 99 only appears on northbound signage; Klamath Falls only appears on southbound signage; southern end of concurrency with OR 99
Lane		188.65	303.60	188B	OR 99 south – Goshen	Signed as Exit 188 southbound; OR 99 only appears on northbound signage; Klamath Falls only appears on southbound signage; southern end of concurrency with OR 99
Lane		189.64– 190.73	305.20– 306.95	189	OR 225 / 30th Avenue – South Eugene	
Lane	Springfield–Eugene line	191.97	308.95	191	Glenwood Boulevard to OR 126 Bus. east – Downtown Springfield	OR 126 Bus. only appears on northbound signage
Lane	Springfield–Eugene line	192.26	309.41	192	OR 99 north / OR 126 Bus. west – University of Oregon, Downtown Eugene	Northern end of concurrency with OR 99; northbound exit and southbound entrance
Lane	Springfield–Eugene line	192.74	310.18	Whilamut Passage Bridge over the Willamette River		
Lane	Springfield–Eugene line	193.71– 194.18	311.75– 312.50	194A	OR 126 east – Springfield	
Lane	Springfield–Eugene line	193.71– 194.18	311.75– 312.50	194B	I-105 west / OR 126 west – Eugene	Exit 4 on I-105
Lane	Springfield–Eugene line	195.43– 195.70	314.51– 314.95	195A	Beltline Road east – Springfield, Gateway Mall	Signed as Exit 195 southbound; Beltline Road east only appears on northbound signage; Springfield and Eugene only appears on southbound signage
Lane	Springfield–Eugene line	195.43– 195.70	314.51– 314.95	195B	OR 569 west (Randy Papé Beltline) – Springfield, Eugene, Florence, Eugene Airport	Signed as Exit 195 southbound; Beltline Road east only appears on northbound signage; Springfield and Eugene only appears on southbound signage
Lane	Coburg	199.14	320.48	199	Coburg National Historic District	
Linn		209.05	336.43	209	Harrisburg, Junction City	
Linn		216.56	348.52	216	OR 228 – Halsey, Brownsville	
Linn		228.08	367.06	228	OR 34 – Lebanon, Corvallis	
Linn	Albany	233.21	375.32	233	US 20 (Santiam Highway) – Albany, Lebanon, Sweet Home, Foster Lake	Albany only appears on northbound signage; Sweet Home only appears on southbound signage
Linn	Albany	233.85– 234.39	376.35– 377.21	234A	Knox Butte Road – Fair/Expo Center	Signed as exit 234 northbound; no southbound entrance; southbound access via exit 233
Linn	Albany–Millersburg line	233.85– 234.39	376.35– 377.21	234B	OR 99E south – Albany	Southern end of concurrency with OR 99E; southbound exit and northbound entrance
Linn	Millersburg	235.66	379.26	235	Viewcrest	Northbound signage
Linn	Millersburg	235.66	379.26	235	Millersburg	Southbound signage
Linn	Millersburg	237.66	382.48	237	Viewcrest	No northbound exit
Linn		238.23	383.39	238	OR 164 north – South Jefferson, Scio, Millersburg	South Jefferson only appears on northbound signage; Millersburg only appears on southbound signage
Linn		239.66	385.70	239	Dever–Conner	
Linn–Marion county line		240.65	387.29	Santiam River		
Marion		242.12	389.65	242	Talbot Road	
Marion		243.52	391.91	243	Ankeny Hill	
Marion		244.67	393.76	244	OR 164 south – North Jefferson, Jefferson	North Jefferson only appears on northbound signage; Jefferson only appears on southbound signage
Marion		248.40	399.76	248	Delaney Road – Sunnyside, Turner	Sunnyside only appears on northbound signage; Delaney Road only appears on southbound signage
Marion	Salem	248.57	400.03	249	Commercial Street	Northbound exit and southbound entrance
Marion	Salem	251.52	404.78	252	Kuebler Boulevard	
Marion	Salem	253.86	408.55	253	OR 22 / OR 99E Bus. north – Detroit Lake, Bend	
Marion	Salem	256.27	412.43	256	OR 213 north (Market Street) – Silverton, Lancaster Mall	Silverton only appears on northbound signage; Lancaster Mall only appears on southbound signage
Marion	Salem	258.62	416.21	258	OR 99E north (Portland Road)	Northbound signage; northern end of concurrency with OR 99E
Marion	Salem	258.62	416.21	258	North Salem, Oregon State Fairgrounds, L. B. Day Comcast Amphitheatre	Southbound signage
Marion	Salem	259.96	418.37	260A	OR 99E Bus. south (Dr MLK Jr Parkway)	Southbound exit and northbound entrance
Marion	Salem	260.21	418.77	260B	Chemawa Road – Keizer	Signed as Exit 260 northbound; Chemawa Road only appears on northbound signage
Marion		263.48	424.03	263	Brooks, Gervais	
Marion	Woodburn	271.85	437.50	271	OR 214 south / OR 219 north – Woodburn, Molalla, Silverton	Molalla only appears on northbound signage; Silverton only appears on southbound signage
Marion		278.66	448.46	278	Ehlen Road – Donald, Aurora National Historic District	Donald only appears on northbound signage; Ehlen Road only appears on southbound signage
Clackamas		282.24	454.22	282A	OR 551 south – Canby, Hubbard	Southbound exit and northbound entrance
Clackamas		282.59	454.78	282	Canby	Northbound signage
Clackamas		282.59	454.78	282B	Charbonneau District	Southbound signage
Clackamas	Wilsonville	283.10	455.61	Boone Bridge over the Willamette River		
Clackamas	Wilsonville	283.87	456.84	283	Wilsonville Road	
Washington	Wilsonville	286.17	460.55	286	OR 141 north (Boones Ferry Road) / Elligsen Road	
Washington	Tualatin	288.20– 288.97	463.81– 465.05	288	I-205 north – Oregon City, West Linn	West Linn only appears on southbound signage
Washington	Tualatin	289.49	465.89	289	Nyberg Street / Tualatin-Sherwood Road - Tualatin	
Washington	Tualatin	290.47	467.47	290	Lower Boones Ferry Road	
Washington–Clackamas county line	Tigard	291.29	468.79	291	Carman Drive	
Washington–Clackamas county line	Tigard–Lake Oswego line	292.19	470.23	292A	OR 217 north to US 26 – Tigard, Beaverton	Signed as Exit 292 southbound; 72nd Avenue, Tigard, and Beaverton only appear on northbound signage; Lake Oswego only appears on southbound signage
Washington–Clackamas county line	Tigard–Lake Oswego line	292.19	470.23	292B	Kruse Way, 72nd Avenue – Lake Oswego	Signed as Exit 292 southbound; 72nd Avenue, Tigard, and Beaverton only appear on northbound signage; Lake Oswego only appears on southbound signage
Washington	Tigard	292.90– 293.28	471.38– 471.99	293	Haines Street	
Multnomah	Portland	293.79	472.81	294	Barbur Boulevard	Northbound signage
Multnomah	Portland	293.79	472.81	294	OR 99W – Tigard, Newberg	Southbound signage
Multnomah	Portland	295.03	474.80	295	Capitol Highway	No northbound exit
Multnomah	Portland	295.52	475.59	295	Taylors Ferry Road	Northbound exit only
Multnomah	Portland	296.30	476.85	296A	Barbur Boulevard	Southbound exit and northbound entrance
Multnomah	Portland	296.68	477.46	296B	Multnomah Boulevard	Southbound exit and northbound entrance
Multnomah	Portland	297.16	478.23	297	Terwilliger Boulevard	No southbound entrance
Multnomah	Portland	298.74	480.78	298	Corbett Avenue	Northbound exit only
Multnomah	Portland	299.16– 299.83	481.45– 482.53	299A	OR 43 (Macadam Avenue) to US 26 east / Ross Island Bridge – Lake Oswego	US 26 and Ross Island Bridge only appear on northbound signage; Lake Oswego only appears on southbound signage
Multnomah	Portland	299.51– 300.27	482.01– 483.24	299B	I-405 north to US 26 west – City Center, Beaverton	No exit number southbound; City Center only appears northbound; Beaverton only appears southbound
Multnomah	Portland	300.35– 300.45	483.37– 483.53	Marquam Bridge over the Willamette River		
Multnomah	Portland	300.65– 301.91	483.85– 485.88	300	I-84 / US 30 east – The Dalles, PDX	Northbound signage; access to OMSI and Central Eastside Industrial District
Multnomah	Portland	300.65– 301.91	483.85– 485.88	300B	OR 99E to US 26 east – OMSI, Oregon City	Southbound signage; southbound exit and northbound entrance
Multnomah	Portland	300.65– 301.91	483.85– 485.88	301	I-84 / US 30 east – The Dalles	Southbound signage; southern end of concurrency with US 30
Multnomah	Portland	302.08– 302.60	486.15– 486.99	302A	Broadway / Weidler Street – Moda Center	
Multnomah	Portland	302.73– 303.47	487.20– 488.39	302B	I-405 south / US 30 west – St. Helens, Beaverton	Beaverton only appears on southbound signage; northern end of concurrency with US 30
Multnomah	Portland	303.15	487.87	302C	Greeley Avenue – Swan Island	Northbound exit and southbound entrance
Multnomah	Portland	303.75– 304.47	488.84– 490.00	303	Killingsworth Street – Swan Island	Northbound signage
Multnomah	Portland	303.75– 304.47	488.84– 490.00	303	Alberta Street – Swan Island	Southbound signage
Multnomah	Portland	304.92	490.72	304	Rosa Parks Way	
Multnomah	Portland	305.43	491.54	305	US 30 Byp. (Lombard Street)	Northbound exit and southbound entrance; signed as Exits 305A (east) and 305B (west)
Multnomah	Portland	305.91	492.31	306A	Columbia Boulevard	Northbound exit and southbound entrance
Multnomah	Portland	306.44	493.17	306B	Victory Boulevard – Expo Center	No southbound exit
Multnomah	Portland	306.97	494.02	306	To US 30 Byp. (Lombard Street) / Interstate Avenue - Portland International Raceway, Portland Meadows	Southbound exit and northbound entrance; former OR 99W south
Multnomah	Portland	307.33	494.60	307	OR 99E south (Martin Luther King Jr. Boulevard) / OR 120 west (Marine Drive) – Delta Park	Delta Park only appears on northbound signage
Multnomah	North Portland Harbor	307.45– 307.70	494.79– 495.20	North Portland Harbor Bridge		
Multnomah	Hayden Island	307.77– 307.99	495.31– 495.66	308	Hayden Island, ODOT Permits	
Columbia River		308.17– 308.37	495.95– 496.27	Interstate Bridge		
Columbia River		308.17– 308.37	495.95– 496.27		I-5 north – Seattle	Continuation into Washington
1.000 mi = 1.609 km; 1.000 km = 0.621 mi: Concurrency terminus; Incomplete access

Interstate 5
Previous state: California	Oregon	Next state: Washington
