= Oregon Route 99 =

State highway in western Oregon, US

Oregon Route 99
- Route 99 highlighted in red

Route information
- Maintained by ODOT
- Length: 211 mi (340 km)
- Existed: 1972–present

Major junctions
- South end: I-5 in Ashland
- OR 66 in Ashland; OR 62 / OR 238 in Medford; OR 234 in Gold Hill; US 199 in Grants Pass; OR 42 near Winston; OR 138 in Roseburg; OR 38 in Drain; I-105 / OR 126 in Eugene; OR 36 near Junction City
- North end: OR 99E / OR 99W in Junction City

Location
- Country: United States
- State: Oregon
- Counties: Douglas, Jackson, Josephine, Lane

Highway system
- Oregon Highways; Interstate; US; State; Named; Scenic
← US 99	→ OR 99E

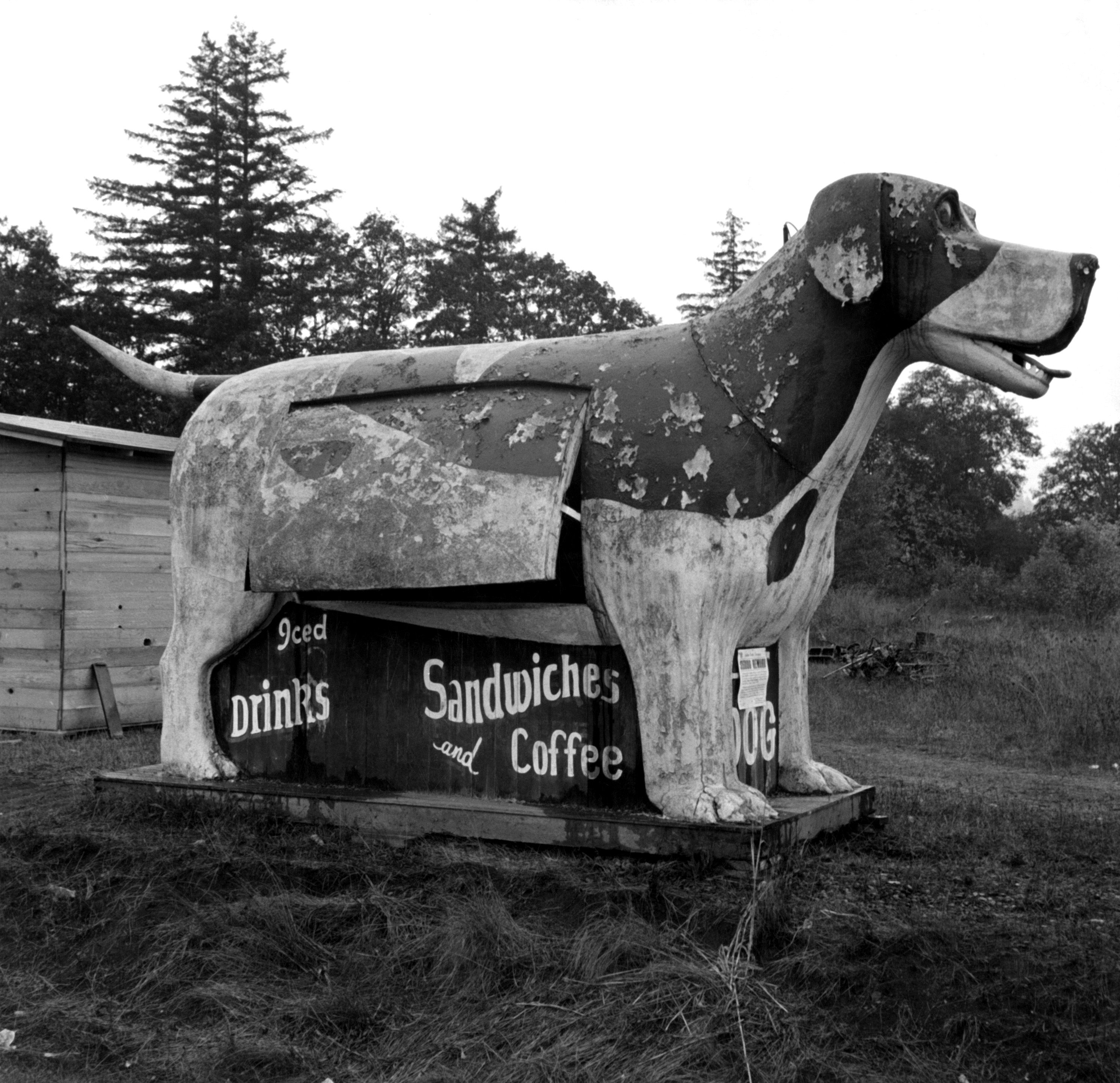
Refreshment stand on US highway 99 in Oregon, 1939

Oregon Route 99 is a state highway that runs between the southern border of Oregon, and the city of Junction City. Oregon Route 99 was formed from parts of the former U.S. Route 99; it shares much of its route with I-5, but much of it is also independent. Between Portland and Junction City, the highway is forked into two routes: Oregon Route 99E and Oregon Route 99W.

== Route description ==
Oregon Route 99 technically starts at an interchange with Interstate 5 at exit 11, south of Ashland. There it departs from the freeway, running parallel to I-5 as it passes through the cities of Ashland (as Main Street), Talent, Phoenix, and Medford. The highway rejoins I-5 at exit 35, just northwest of Central Point.

OR 99 departs from I-5 several more times through the mountains of southern Oregon, only to rejoin again a short distance later. Junctions are found in Gold Hill (2nd Ave), Grants Pass, between Myrtle Creek and Sutherlin (crossing I-5 in Roseburg), through Drain and Yoncalla, and Cottage Grove and Goshen. These departures serve as business routes for I-5, as Oregon does not have or sign Interstate business routes.

When it reaches Eugene, OR 99 departs from I-5 for a final time. It heads west into downtown, along Franklin Boulevard past the University of Oregon. Downtown, OR 99 is on the 6th and 7th Avenue couplet. (Much of the section in Eugene is co-signed with either Oregon Route 126 or OR 126 Business.) West of downtown it heads north on an expressway alignment, which continues to Junction City. In Junction City, OR 99 ends, as it splits into eastern and western forks.

=== Highways comprised ===
OR 99 comprises the following named highways (see Oregon highways and routes) and roads, from south to north:

- The Rogue Valley Highway No. 63;
- Part of the Pacific Highway No. 1 (concurrent with I-5);
- The Gold Hill Spur No. 486;
- The Sams Valley Highway No. 271 (concurrent with OR 234);
- The Rogue River Highway No. 60;
- Part of the Redwood Highway No. 25;
- Part of the Pacific Highway (concurrent with I-5);
- Part of Fifth Street in Canyonville;
- Part of the Tiller-Trail Highway No. 230;
- Part of the Pacific Highway (concurrent with I-5);
- The Dillard Highway, which is no longer a state highway;
- Part of the Coos Bay-Roseburg Highway No. 35 (concurrent with OR 42);
- The Oakland-Shady Highway, which is no longer a state highway (concurrent with OR 138);
- Part of the Pacific Highway (concurrent with I-5);
- The Drain-Yoncalla Highway, which is no longer a state highway;
- Part of the Umpqua Highway No. 45;
- Part of the Pacific Highway (concurrent with I-5);
- The Goshen-Divide Highway No. 226;
- Part of the Pacific Highway (concurrent with I-5); and
- Part of the Pacific Highway West No. 1W.

It followed the Myrtle Creek Highway previously. This section was removed by 2018.

== Major intersections ==
County	Location	mi	km	Exit	Destinations	Notes
Jackson		0.00	0.00		I-5 south – Yreka	
Jackson	Ashland	3.48	5.60		OR 66 to I-5 – Lakeview, Klamath Falls	
Jackson	Medford	18.64	30.00		OR 62 east to I-5 / OR 140 – Crater Lake OR 238 west – Jacksonville	
Jackson		23.85	38.38		Blackwell Road	Former US 99 north
Jackson		24.12	38.82	35	I-5 south – Medford OR 140 east	Southern end of I-5 overlap
Jackson		29.47	47.43	40	I-5 north – Grants Pass	Northern end of I-5 overlap
Jackson		29.79	47.94		Blackwell Road	Former US 99 south
Jackson	Gold Hill	30.19	48.59		OR 234 east – Crater Lake	Southern end of OR 234 overlap
Jackson		32.85	52.87		To I-5 (via OR 234 west)	Northern end of OR 234 overlap
Jackson		34.73	55.89		I-5 – Medford, Grants Pass	Interchange
Josephine	Grants Pass	47.17	75.91		US 199 to I-5 – Cave Junction, Crescent City	
Josephine	Grants Pass	47.35	76.20		OR 238 south – Murphy, Jacksonville	
Josephine	Grants Pass	47.37– 47.58	76.23– 76.57		Seventh Street Bridge (northbound) and Caveman Bridge (southbound) over the Rogue River	
Josephine	Grants Pass	48.15	77.49		F Street to I-5	Former Redwood Spur
Josephine	Grants Pass	48.28	77.70		E Street	Former Rogue River Loop Highway
Josephine	Grants Pass	49.94	80.37	58	I-5 south – Medford	Southern end of I-5 overlap
Josephine		53.31	85.79	61	Merlin	
Josephine		58.15	93.58	66	Hugo	
Josephine		60.95	98.09	Sexton Mountain Pass summit, elevation 1,960 ft or 600 m		
Josephine		63.26	101.81	71	Sunny Valley	
Josephine		65.68	105.70	Smith Hill summit, elevation 1,730 ft or 530 m		
Josephine	Wolf Creek	67.90– 68.47	109.27– 110.19	76	Wolf Creek	
Josephine		69.98	112.62	78	Speaker Road	Southbound exit and northbound entrance
Josephine		71.68	115.36	Stage Road Pass summit, elevation 1,830 ft or 560 m		
Douglas		72.66	116.93	80	Glendale	
Douglas		75.12	120.89	83	Barton Road	Northbound exit and southbound entrance
Douglas	Quines Creek	77.97	125.48	86	Quines Creek Road / Barton Road	Barton Road only appears on southbound signage
Douglas		79.95	128.67	88	Azalea, Galesville Reservoir	
Douglas		82.03	132.01	Canyon Creek Pass summit, elevation 2,020 ft or 620 m		
Douglas		87.65	141.06	95	Canyon Creek	
Douglas	Canyonville	89.93	144.73	98	I-5 north – Roseburg	Northern end of I-5 overlap
Douglas		93.40	150.31	101	I-5 south – Grants Pass	Southern end of I-5 overlap
Douglas		93.98	151.25	102	Gazley Road	
Douglas	Tri-City	96.04	154.56	103	I-5 north – Roseburg	Northern end of I-5 overlap
Douglas	Myrtle Creek	101.29	163.01	108	I-5 south – Grants Pass	Southern end of I-5 overlap
Douglas		103.30	166.25	110	Boomer Hill Road	
Douglas		105.07– 105.17	169.09– 169.25	112	I-5 north – Roseburg	Northern end of I-5 overlap
Douglas	Winston	114.00	183.47		OR 42 west – Myrtle Point, Coquille, Coos Bay	Southern end of OR 42 overlap
Douglas		116.85	188.05		OR 42 east to I-5 – Roseburg, Grants Pass	Northern end of OR 42 overlap
Douglas		117.97	189.85		I-5 south – Grants Pass	No access to northbound I-5
Douglas	Roseburg	121.67	195.81		OR 138 west to I-5 – West Roseburg	Southern end of OR 138 overlap
Douglas	Roseburg	121.91	196.20		OR 138 east (North Umpqua Highway) – Diamond Lake, Crater Lake	North end of OR 138 overlap
Douglas	Winchester	127.50	205.19		I-5 / OR 138	
Douglas	Sutherlin	135.00	217.26		To OR 138 / I-5 – Elkton	
Douglas		139.23	224.07	140	I-5 south – Roseburg	Southern end of I-5 overlap; southbound exit and northbound entrance
Douglas		140.89	226.74	142	Metz Hill	
Douglas		144.96	233.29	146	Rice Valley	
Douglas	Rice Hill	147.15– 148.34	236.81– 238.73	148	Rice Hill	
Douglas		149.04	239.86	150	I-5 north – Eugene	Northern end of I-5 overlap
Douglas	Drain	156.86	252.44		OR 38 west – Ocean Beaches, Reedsport, Coos Bay	Southern end of OR 38 overlap
Douglas		162.88	262.13		Curtin Road – Anlauf, Lorane	Former Territorial Highway
Douglas	Anlauf	163.52	263.16	162	I-5 south – Roseburg	Northern end of OR 38 overlap; south end of I-5 overlap
Douglas		164.59	264.88	163	Curtin, Lorane	
Lane		169.91	273.44	170	I-5 north – Portland	Northern end of I-5 overlap; northbound exit and southbound entrance
Lane	Creswell	183.79	295.78		To I-5 (via OR 222) – Eugene, Roseburg	
Lane		189.53	305.02		OR 58 east (Willamette Highway) – Oakridge, Klamath Falls	
Lane		189.90	305.61		Franklin Boulevard	Former US 99 north
Lane		189.90	305.61	188B	I-5 south – Roseburg	Southern end of I-5 overlap
Lane		190.94– 191.58	307.29– 308.32	189	30th Avenue (OR 225) – South Eugene	Former US 99 north
Lane	Springfield–Eugene line	193.05	310.68	191	Glenwood Boulevard to OR 126 Bus. east – Springfield	OR 126 Bus. only appears on northbound signage
Lane	Eugene	193.63	311.62	192	I-5 north – Portland	Northern end of I-5 overlap; northbound exit and southbound entrance
Lane	Eugene	193.71	311.75		Riverview Street	Interchange; no southbound entrance
Lane	Eugene	194.22	312.57		OR 126 Bus. east – Springfield	Interchange; southern end of OR 126 Bus. overlap; southbound exit and northbound entrance; former US 99 south
Lane	Eugene	195.66	314.88		Coburg Road to I-105 / I-5 – Springfield	Interchange
Lane	Eugene	196.38	316.04		I-105 / OR 126 east to I-5 – Springfield	Interchange; northern end of OR 126 Bus. overlap; southern end of OR 126 overlap
Lane	Eugene	196.63	316.45		Blair Boulevard	Former Junction City–Eugene Highway
Lane	Eugene	197.47	317.80		OR 126 west – Veneta, Elmira, Florence	Northern end of OR 126 overlap
Lane		201.31	323.98		OR 569 (Randy Pape Beltline) to I-5 / OR 126 – Florence, Springfield	Interchange
Lane		208.45	335.47		OR 36 – Cheshire, Florence	
Lane	Junction City	209.97	337.91		1st Avenue to High Pass Road – Santa Clara	Former Junction City–Eugene Highway
Lane	Junction City	211.00	339.57		OR 99E north / OR 99W north – Albany, Portland, Corvallis, McMinnville	
1.000 mi = 1.609 km; 1.000 km = 0.621 mi: Concurrency terminus; Incomplete access
