= Oregon Route 164 =

State highway in western Oregon, US

Oregon Route 164
- Route 164 highlighted in red

Route information
- Maintained by ODOT
- Length: 8.54 mi (13.74 km)
- Existed: 2002–present

Major junctions
- South end: I-5 near Millersburg
- North end: I-5 in Millersburg

Location
- Country: United States
- State: Oregon
- Counties: Linn, Marion

Highway system
- Oregon Highways; Interstate; US; State; Named; Scenic
← OR 154	→ OR 173

Oregon Route 164 is an Oregon state highway running from Interstate 5 in Marion County north of Millersburg to I-5 at Millersburg in Linn County. OR 164 is known as the Jefferson Highway No. 164 (see Oregon highways and routes). It is 8.54 miles (13.74 km) long and runs north–south, primarily functioning as a loop road to Jefferson.

OR 164 was established in 2002 as part of Oregon's project to assign route numbers to highways that previously were not assigned.

== Route description ==
OR 164 begins at an intersection with I-5 approximately 6 miles (9.7 km) north of Millersburg. It heads southeast and south to Jefferson, and then turns southwest to rejoin I-5 at Millersburg.

== History ==
The Jefferson Highway was designated as US 99E in 1926. After the completion of the Willamette Valley section of Interstate 5 in the 1960s, US 99E between Salem and Albany was realigned to travel as one co-signed road with the new freeway.

OR 164 was assigned to the Jefferson Highway in 2002.

== Major intersections ==
County	Location	mi	km	Destinations	Notes
Linn		0.00	0.00	I-5 / OR 99E – Albany, Salem	I-5 exit 238.
Marion		8.54	13.74	I-5 / OR 99E – Albany, Salem	I-5 exit 244.
1.000 mi = 1.609 km; 1.000 km = 0.621 mi
