= Saginaw, Oregon =

Unincorporated community in the state of Oregon, United States

- Unincorporated community
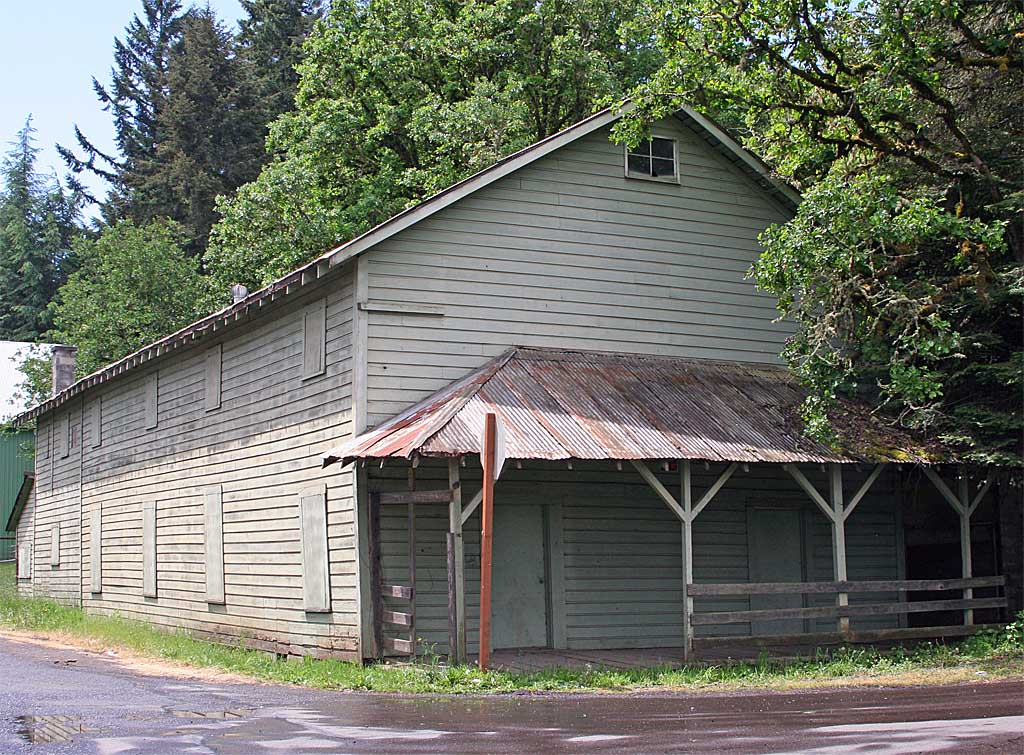
- Saginaw's convention barns, used for church conventions since 1921

- Location within Oregon Location within the United States
- Coordinates: 43°49′57″N 123°02′43″W
- Country: United States
- State: Oregon
- County: Lane
- Elevation: 620 ft (190 m)
- Time zone: UTC-8 (Pacific (PST))
  - Summer (DST): UTC-7 (PDT)
- ZIP codes: 97472
- GNIS feature ID: 1126446

Saginaw is an unincorporated community in Lane County, Oregon, United States. Saginaw had a post office with a ZIP code 97472 until the market it operated in was closed. Saginaw lies at the intersection of Oregon Route 99 and Saginaw Road, just west of the Saginaw exit of Interstate 5. Saginaw is northeast of Cottage Grove.

== Climate ==
This region experiences warm (but not hot) and dry summers, with no average monthly temperatures above 71.6 °F. According to the Köppen Climate Classification system, Saginaw has a warm-summer Mediterranean climate, abbreviated "Csb" on climate maps.
