= Oregon Route 99E =

State highway in western Oregon, US

Oregon Route 99E
- Route 99E; mainline in red, business route in blue

Route information
- Maintained by ODOT
- Length: 109.78 mi (176.67 km)
- Existed: 1972–present

Major junctions
- South end: OR 99 / OR 99W in Junction City
- US 20 in Albany; I-5 in Albany; OR 22 / OR 99E Bus. in Salem; I-5 in Salem; OR 214 / OR 211 in Woodburn; I-205 in Oregon City; OR 224 in Milwaukie; US 26 in Portland; I-84 / US 30 in Portland
- North end: I-5 / OR 120 in Portland

Location
- Country: United States
- State: Oregon
- Counties: Clackamas, Lane, Linn, Marion, Multnomah

Highway system
- Oregon Highways; Interstate; US; State; Named; Scenic
| ← OR 99 | → OR 99W |

Oregon Route 99E is an Oregon state highway route that runs between Junction City, Oregon and an interchange with I-5 just south of the Oregon/Washington border, in Portland. It, along with OR 99W, makes up a split of OR 99 in the northern part of the state. This split existed when the route was U.S. Route 99, when the two branches were U.S. 99W and U.S. 99E. (Another such split occurred in California, but with the decommissioning of U.S. 99, that state elected to rename its U.S. 99W as Interstate 5, rather than preserve the directional suffix.)

Currently, OR 99E and OR 99W do not reconvene at a northern junction in Oregon; OR 99W has been truncated from its original route, and ends in North Portland at an interchange with OR 99E and Interstate 5; nor is OR 99 (without a suffix) signed anywhere in Portland.

== Route description ==
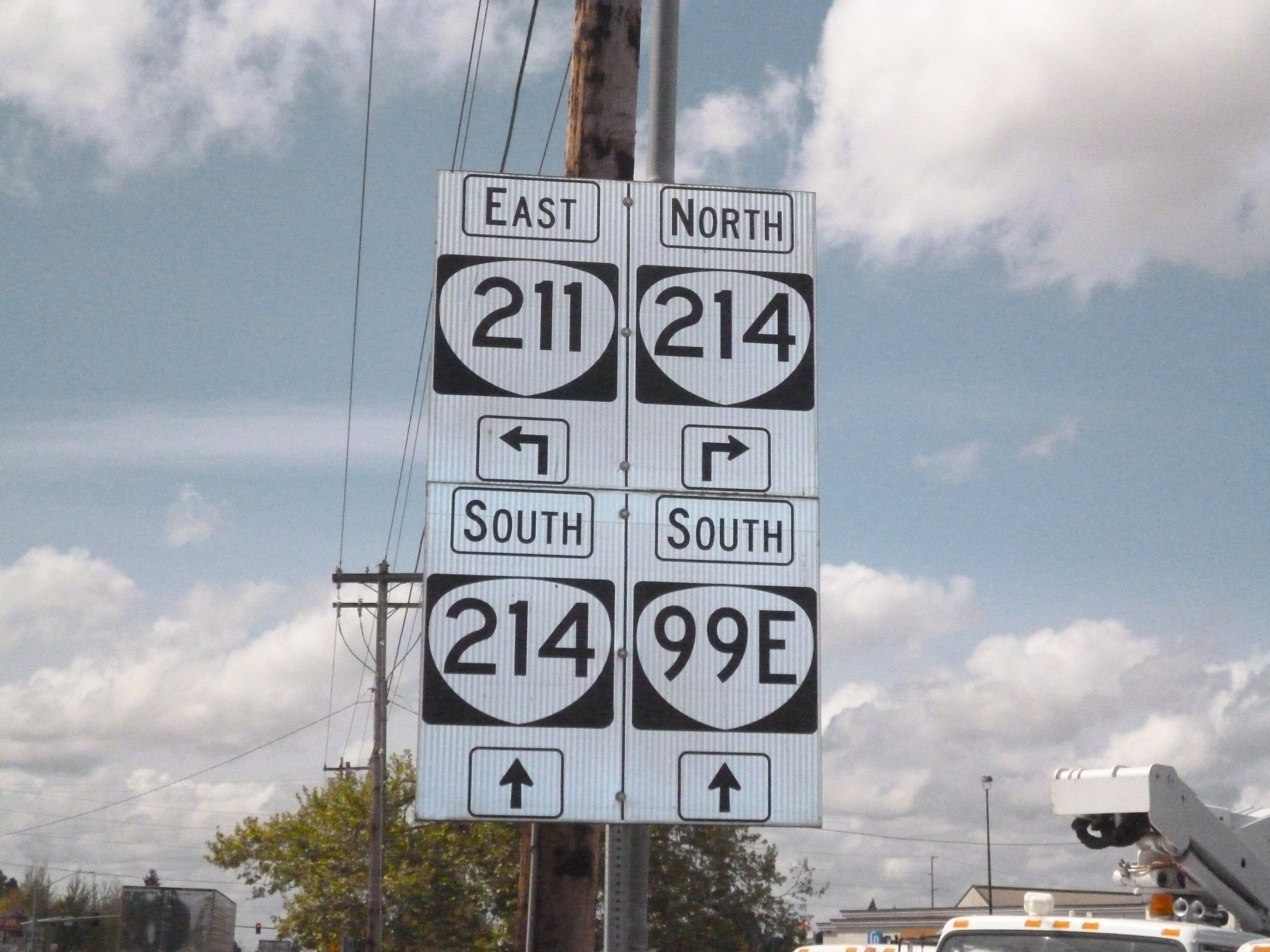
Oregon 99E, 211 and 214 Direction Sign

OR 99E has its southern terminus in Junction City. Almost immediately after leaving the city limits the route crosses the Willamette River, and serves Willamette Valley towns such as Harrisburg and Tangent. North of Tangent, the route enters the city of Albany and serves as a main thoroughfare through town (for about a mile, OR 99E shares an alignment with US 20). At the northern end of Albany, OR 99E joins I-5.

OR 99E remains co-signed with I-5 until Salem where it again splits off from the interstate, serving many towns in northern Marion County. (A business route through Salem, OR 99E Business, consists of a section of OR 22 and the Dr. Martin Luther King, Jr. Parkway; a previous alignment of OR 99E along Commercial Street, Fairgrounds Road, and Portland Road is often erroneously referred to as "99E" even though it is no longer part of the Oregon Route system). North of Salem, OR 99E serves the northern Willamette Valley, passing through cities such as Woodburn, Hubbard, and Canby, before entering the Portland metro area in Oregon City. The stretch between Canby and Oregon City is notorious for frequent and serious accidents.

Starting in Oregon City, and continuing through the suburban communities of Gladstone, Oak Grove, and Milwaukie, OR 99E is known as McLoughlin Boulevard (after fur trader John McLoughlin). The road crosses the John McLoughlin Bridge just south of Gladstone. North of Milwaukie (and an interchange with OR 224), OR 99E is a high-capacity urban expressway.

In Portland, OR 99E continues as the McLoughlin Boulevard expressway until passing beneath the Ross Island Bridge (US 26), where it runs on the couplet of Martin Luther King Jr. Boulevard (formerly Union Avenue) and Grand Avenue. It is the main north–south arterial through the central east side of the city. North of NE Broadway, OR 99E continues as MLK Jr. Boulevard and passes through several Northeast Portland Neighborhoods until its terminus at an interchange with I-5 and OR 120 in Delta Park, just south of the Columbia River crossing. (The interchange also involves Interstate Avenue, which was the prior route of OR 99W before the latter route was truncated).

== History ==
OR 99E was originally part of U.S. Route 99E (US 99E), which was created alongside US 99W in 1930 as part of a split of US 99 between Junction City and Portland. The parallel highways ran through the Willamette Valley and the suffixed designations were proposed by cities on the west side. In the 1950s and 1960s, I-5 (also signed as US 99 Bypass) was built parallel to US 99E and absorbed the Albany–Salem section of the highway to form a concurrency. US 99, US 99E, and US 99W were decommissioned in December 1971 and replaced by their state counterparts the following year.

== Major intersections ==
Note: mileposts do not reflect actual mileage due to realignments. Not all interchanges are shown on the I-5 overlap; for a full list see the I-5 exit list.

| County | Location | mi | km | Destinations | Notes |
|---|---|---|---|---|---|
| Lane | Junction City | 32.37 | 52.09 | OR 99 south / OR 99W north – Junction City, Eugene, Monroe, Corvallis | |
| Linn | Halsey | 19.36 | 31.16 | OR 228 to I-5 – Brownsville, Sweet Home | |
| Linn | Tangent | 7.81 | 12.57 | OR 34 to I-5 – Corvallis, Lebanon | Interchange |
| Linn | Albany | 2.42 | 3.89 | US 20 west – Albany City Center, Corvallis | Southern end of US 20 overlap; interchange |
| Linn | Albany | 2.17 | 3.49 | Jackson Street – Sunrise District | Interchange |
| Linn | Albany | 1.40 | 2.25 | US 20 east to I-5 south – Lebanon, Eugene | Northern end of US 20 overlap |
| Linn | Albany | 0.00 234.69 | 0.00 377.70 | I-5 south – Eugene | Southern end of I-5 overlap |
| Linn | Albany | 238.24 | 383.41 | OR 164 north – Scio, Millersburg | |
| Marion | | 244.68 | 393.77 | OR 164 south – North Jefferson | |
| Marion | Salem | 249.35 | 401.29 | Commercial Street | Northbound exit and southbound entrance |
| Marion | Salem | 253.87 | 408.56 | OR 22 / OR 99E Bus. north – Detroit Lake, Stayton | |
| Marion | Salem | 256.28 | 412.44 | OR 213 (Market Street) – Silverton, Lancaster Mall | |
| Marion | Salem | 258.68 46.08 | 416.31 74.16 | I-5 north – Portland, Oregon State Fair, L. B. Day Amphitheatre, Salem City Center | Northern end of I-5 overlap |
| Marion | Salem | 44.46 | 71.55 | To I-5 / Chemawa Road (OR 99E Bus. south) – Chemawa, Keizer, Silverton | |
| Marion | Woodburn | 32.87 | 52.90 | OR 214 south – Woodburn City Center, Mt. Angel, Silverton | Southern end of OR 214 overlap |
| Marion | Woodburn | 31.70 | 51.02 | OR 214 north / OR 211 to I-5 – Newberg, Molalla | Northern end of OR 214 overlap |
| Marion | | 27.26 | 43.87 | OR 551 to I-5 – Wilsonville | Interchange; northbound exit and southbound entrance |
| Clackamas | Oregon City | 12.56 | 20.21 | OR 43 (Main Street) – Oregon City, West Linn, Lake Oswego, Portland | |
| Clackamas | Oregon City | 11.73 | 18.88 | I-205 – West Linn, Salem, Seattle, The Dalles | Interchange |
| Clackamas | Milwaukie | 5.46 | 8.79 | OR 224 – Clackamas, Damascus, Estacada | Interchange |
| Multnomah | Portland | 4.39 | 7.07 | Tacoma Street to Johnson Creek Boulevard – Sellwood Bridge | Interchange |
| Multnomah | Portland | 3.70 | 5.95 | Bybee Boulevard – Westmoreland, Sellwood, Eastmoreland, Reed College | Interchange; southbound exit and entrance |
| Multnomah | Portland | 2.61 | 4.20 | Milwaukie Avenue – Westmoreland | Interchange; southbound exit and northbound entrance |
| Multnomah | Portland | 2.33 | 3.75 | Holgate Boulevard – Reed College | |
| Multnomah | Portland | 1.49 | 2.40 | US 26 (Powell Boulevard) – Ross Island Bridge, Gresham, Mount Hood | Interchange |
| Multnomah | Portland | 0.69 | 1.11 | Hawthorne Bridge | Southbound interchange and northbound at-grade intersection |
| Multnomah | Portland | 0.39 | 0.63 | Morrison Bridge to I-5 – Salem, Seattle | Southbound interchange and northbound at-grade intersection |
| Multnomah | Portland | 0.00 | 0.00 | Burnside Bridge to I-5 | Access via Couch Street |
| Multnomah | Portland | −0.18 | −0.29 | I-84 east / US 30 east – Portland Airport, The Dalles | Southbound access is via Everett Street |
| Multnomah | Portland | −0.59 | −0.95 | Multnomah Street – Steel Bridge, Lloyd Center | |
| Multnomah | Portland | −0.84 | −1.35 | To I-5 / Broadway – Memorial Coliseum, Broadway Bridge | |
| Multnomah | Portland | −3.75 | −6.04 | US 30 Byp. (Lombard Street) – St. Johns Bridge, Astoria, Portland Airport, Hood River | |
| Multnomah | Portland | −4.01 | −6.45 | Columbia Boulevard – Portland Meadows, Portland Airport | |
| Multnomah | Portland | −4.46 | −7.18 | To Vancouver Way / Schmeer Road / Gertz Road | Interchange; southbound exit and entrance |
| Multnomah | Portland | −4.68 | −7.53 | Vancouver Avenue – Portland Meadows | Southbound exit and entrance |
| Multnomah | Portland | −4.87 | −7.84 | To Gertz Road / Northeast 6th Drive | Interchange; southbound exit and entrance |
| Multnomah | Portland | −4.88 | −7.85 | To Vancouver Way – Portland Airport | Northbound exit and entrance |
| Multnomah | Portland | −5.75 | −9.25 | Marine Drive east – Delta Park | Interchange |
| Multnomah | Portland | −5.97 | −9.61 | I-5 – Seattle | Exit 307 on I-5 |
| Multnomah | Portland | −6.09 | −9.80 | OR 120 west (Marine Drive) – Expo Center | |
1.000 mi = 1.609 km; 1.000 km = 0.621 mi: Concurrency terminus; Incomplete access
