= Oregon Route 173 =

State highway in Clackamas County, Oregon, US

Oregon Route 173
- Route 173 highlighted in red

Route information
- Maintained by ODOT
- Length: 5.37 mi (8.64 km)
- Existed: 2002–present

Major junctions
- South end: US 26 near Government Camp
- North end: Timberline Lodge

Location
- Country: United States
- State: Oregon
- County: Clackamas

Highway system
- Oregon Highways; Interstate; US; State; Named; Scenic
← OR 164	→ OR 180

Oregon Route 173 is an Oregon state highway running from Timberline Lodge in Clackamas County to U.S. Route 26 near Government Camp. OR 173 is known as the Timberline Highway No. 173 (see Oregon highways and routes). It is 5.37 miles (8.64 km) long and runs in a northeast to southwest "L" pattern, entirely within Clackamas County.

OR 173 was established in 2002 as part of Oregon's project to assign route numbers to highways that previously were not assigned, and, as of September 2010, was unsigned.

== Route description ==
OR 173 begins at an intersection with US 26 east of Government Camp. It travels east and north as it ascends the slopes of Mount Hood, passing through several turns. The highway splits into a pair of one-way roads around the parking lot of the Timberline Lodge ski area and ends at the namesake lodge.

== History ==
The Timberline Highway was opened on November 18, 1949, to serve the lodge and ski area alongside the Mt. Hood Aerial Skiway, an aerial bus system. It replaced an earlier road to the lodge from the west that was narrower and steeper. The new route was paved a year after it opened and was added to the state highway system by the Oregon Highway Commission on September 28, 1950. OR 173 was assigned to the Timberline Highway in 2002.

== Major intersections ==
The entire route is in Clackamas County.

Location	mi	km	Destinations	Notes
	0.00	0.00	US 26 – Hood River, Madras, Government Camp, Portland	
	5.37	8.64	Timberline Lodge	
1.000 mi = 1.609 km; 1.000 km = 0.621 mi
