= Wilbur, Oregon =

Unincorporated community in the state of Oregon, United States

- Unincorporated community
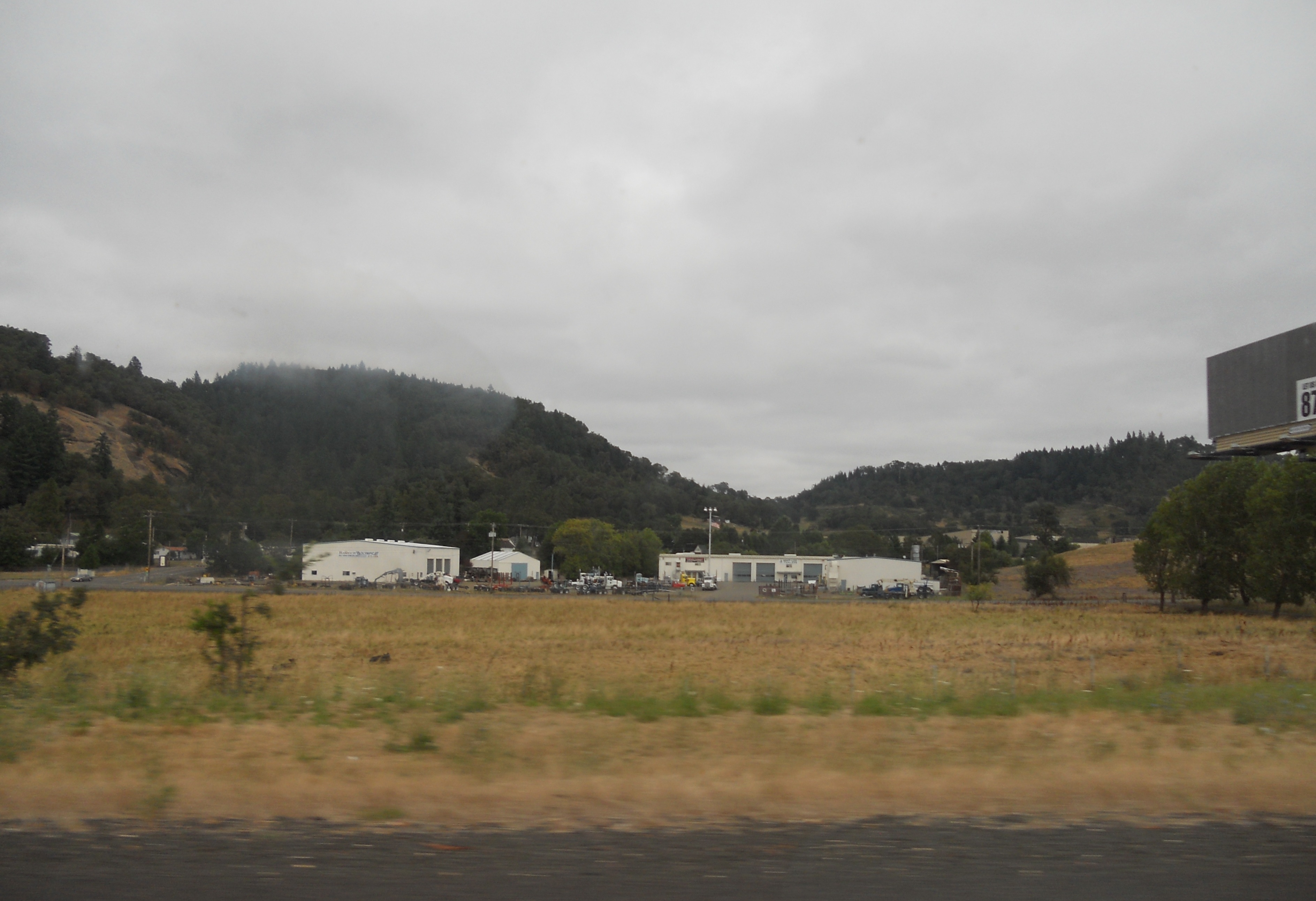

- Location within Oregon Location within the United States
- Coordinates: 43°19′15″N 123°20′26″W
- Country: United States
- State: Oregon
- County: Douglas
- Elevation: 469 ft (143 m)
- Time zone: UTC-8 (Pacific (PST))
  - Summer (DST): UTC-7 (PDT)
- ZIP code: 97494
- Area code: 541
- GNIS feature ID: 1166724

Wilbur is an unincorporated community in Douglas County, Oregon, United States. Wilbur is located along Interstate 5 and Oregon Route 99 north of Winchester. It was originally named Bunton's Gap, but the town was renamed Wilbur after James H. Wilbur. Wilbur started a school on his own land in Bunton's Gap in 1854; in 1857, under the name Umpqua, the college was chartered by the Oregon Territorial Legislature and also affiliated with the Methodist Church. A new two-story school was built, and Wilbur deeded his land to the academy's trustees.

For many years, Umpqua Academy was the only higher education institution between Salem and Sacramento.

The academy closed in 1900. A group for former students and faculty, Umpqua Academy Association, existed from the 1870s until 1930. The Association's papers are held at the University of Oregon.

Wilbur today includes a church, a store, a post office within the store, and a graveyard.
