= Oregon Route 225 =

State highway in Lane County, Oregon, US

Oregon Route 225
- Route 225 highlighted in red

Route information
- Maintained by ODOT
- Length: 2.52 mi (4.06 km)
- Existed: November 13, 2002–present

Major junctions
- South end: I-5 near Eugene
- North end: OR 126 Bus. in Springfield

Location
- Country: United States
- State: Oregon
- County: Lane

Highway system
- Oregon Highways; Interstate; US; State; Named; Scenic
← OR 224	→ OR 226

Oregon Route 225 (OR 225) is an Oregon state highway running from I-5 (and unsigned OR 99) near Eugene to OR 126 Business in Springfield. OR 225 is known as the McVay Highway No. 225 (see Oregon highways and routes). It is 2.52 miles (4.06 km) long and runs north–south, entirely within Lane County.

OR 225 was established on November 13, 2002 as part of Oregon's project to assign route numbers to highways that previously were not assigned. As of October 2020, OR 225 was unsigned.

== Route description ==
OR 225 begins at the southernmost section of exit 189 of Interstate 5, the exit for 30th Avenue and South Eugene. Here, there are only ramps allowing access to I-5 southbound and from I-5 northbound. OR 225 travels north on a two-lane frontage road to the west of I-5 while the state-maintained Franklin Boulevard acts as a frontage road on the east side of the Interstate. While paralleling I-5, the route passes small businesses and side streets allowing access to nearby residences. The route comes to the other half of exit 189 where access to I-5 northbound and from I-5 southbound is provided. Franklin Boulevard terminates at this interchange also. North of this interchange, OR 225 passes over a Central Oregon and Pacific railroad before closely paralleling the Willamette River. While paralleling the river, the route heads through a commercial zone with some trailer parks. After crossing under a Union Pacific railroad underpass, the route heads past more businesses before ending at a roundabout intersection with OR 126 Business within the city limits of Springfield.

== Major intersections ==
The entire route is in Lane County.

Location	mi	km	Destinations	Notes
	0.00– 0.33	0.00– 0.53	I-5 south / OR 99 south / 30th Avenue (CR 1850) – Roseburg, South Eugene	Exit 189 (I-5); access to I-5 southbound / from I-5 northbound only
	0.97	1.56	I-5 north / OR 99 north / Franklin Boulevard – Portland	Exit 189 (I-5); access to I-5 northbound / from I-5 southbound only
Springfield	2.52	4.06	OR 126 Bus. (McKenzie Highway / Franklin Boulevard) – Springfield, Eugene	
1.000 mi = 1.609 km; 1.000 km = 0.621 mi: Incomplete access
