= Oregon Route 120 =

State highway in Multnomah County, Oregon, US

Oregon Route 120
- Route 120 highlighted in red

Route information
- Maintained by ODOT and PBOT
- Length: 2.71 mi (4.36 km)
- Existed: July 24, 2002–present

Major junctions
- West end: North Portland Road in Portland
- East end: I-5 / OR 99E in Portland

Location
- Country: United States
- State: Oregon
- Counties: Multnomah

Highway system
- Oregon Highways; Interstate; US; State; Named; Scenic
← I-105	→ OR 126

Oregon Route 120 (OR 120) is a 2.71-mile-long (4.36 km) state highway in the U.S. state of Oregon. The unsigned highway is internally known by the Oregon Department of Transportation (ODOT) as Swift Highway No. 120. OR 120 runs from a Union Pacific railroad crossing near North Columbia Boulevard to an interchange with Interstate 5 (I-5) and OR 99E. The Swift Highway No. 120 was created in 1931, while the OR 120 designation was created in 2002.

== Route description ==
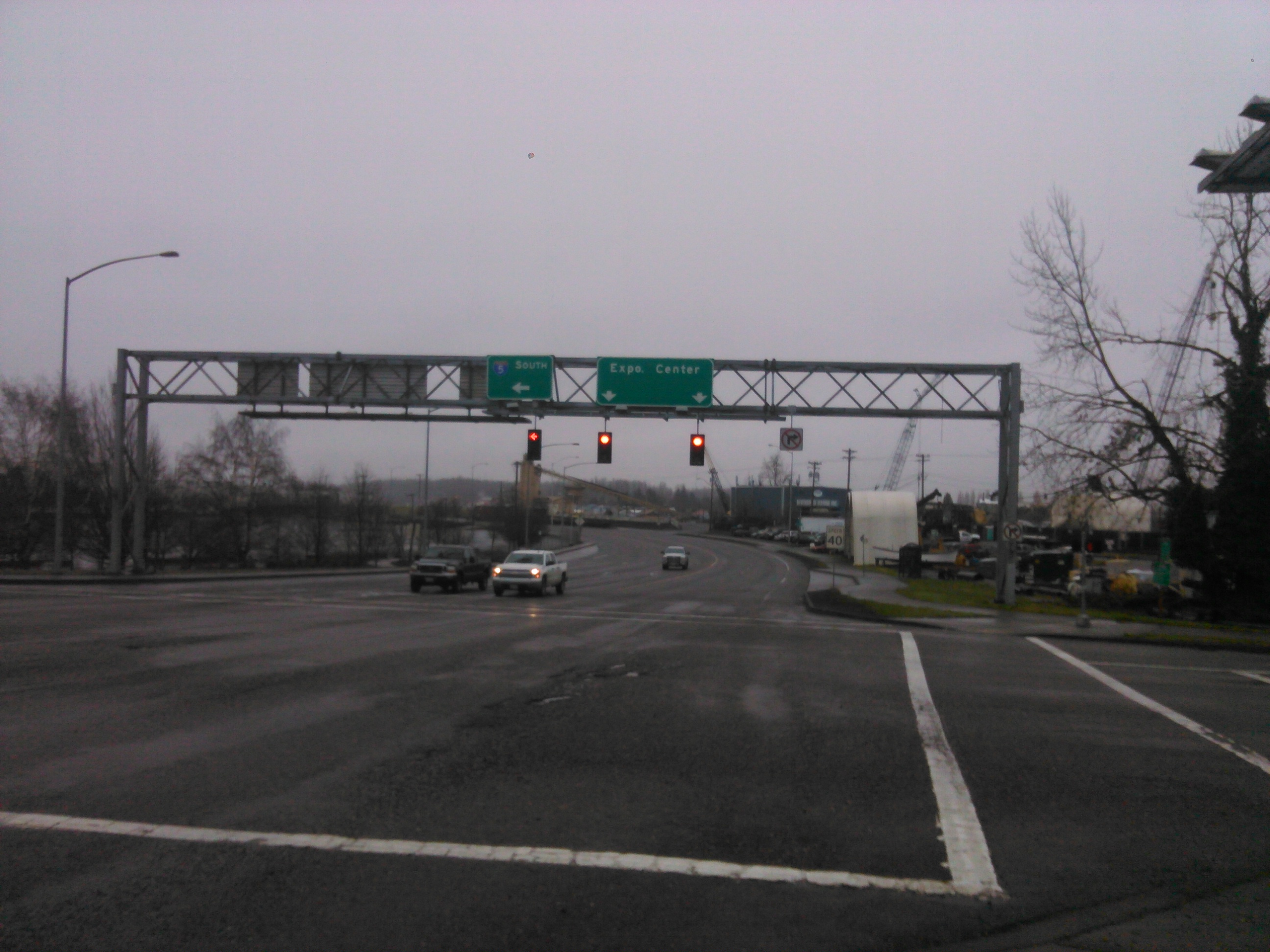
Eastern terminus of OR 120

OR 120 begins at a Union Pacific railroad crossing north of an interchange with North Columbia Boulevard. The road continues northeast as North Portland Road and follows BNSF Railway tracks. About one-half of a mile (0.80 km) from where the highway begins, OR 120 crosses the Columbia Slough Bridge. OR 120 continues to follow BNSF Railway tracks and passes through wetlands before having a T-intersection with North Marine Drive. The road continues southeast as North Marine Drive, following the Columbia River shoreline. After the highway turns southeast, the road goes under the Oregon Slough Railroad Bridge. The highway ends at an intersection with OR 99E and the ramps for exit 307 on I-5. The Portland Expo Center is located near this interchange. The highway is entirely within the city limits of Portland. OR 120 is unsigned for its entire length.

OR 120 is internally known by ODOT as Swift Highway No. 120. The entire length of OR 120 is part of the National Highway System, a network of roads important to the country's economy, defense, and mobility.

== History ==
The Swift Highway No. 120 was established as a secondary highway by the Oregon State Highway Commission on December 3, 1931. On November 22, 1966, a section of the Swift Highway between North Columbia Boulevard and an Oregon–Washington Railroad and Navigation Company railroad crossing was truncated. During the Oregon Transportation Commission meeting on July 24, 2002, the commission approved the OR 120 designation to be placed on the Swift Highway. On July 22, 2008, maintenance for portions of the highway were transferred from ODOT to the city of Portland. The sections that were transferred are from the highway's western terminus to the southwestern end of the Columbia Slough bridge, and the northeastern end of the Columbia Slough Bridge to the end of concrete pavement near the Portland Expo Center.

== Major intersections ==
The entire route is in Portland, Multnomah County.

mi	km	Destinations	Notes
0.00	0.00	North Portland Road	Continuation beyond western terminus at Union Pacific Railroad tracks
2.71	4.36	I-5 OR 99E south (MLK Jr. Boulevard)	Roadway continues as OR 99E
1.000 mi = 1.609 km; 1.000 km = 0.621 mi
