= John McLoughlin Bridge =

Bridge spacing the Clackamas River in the U.S. state of Oregon

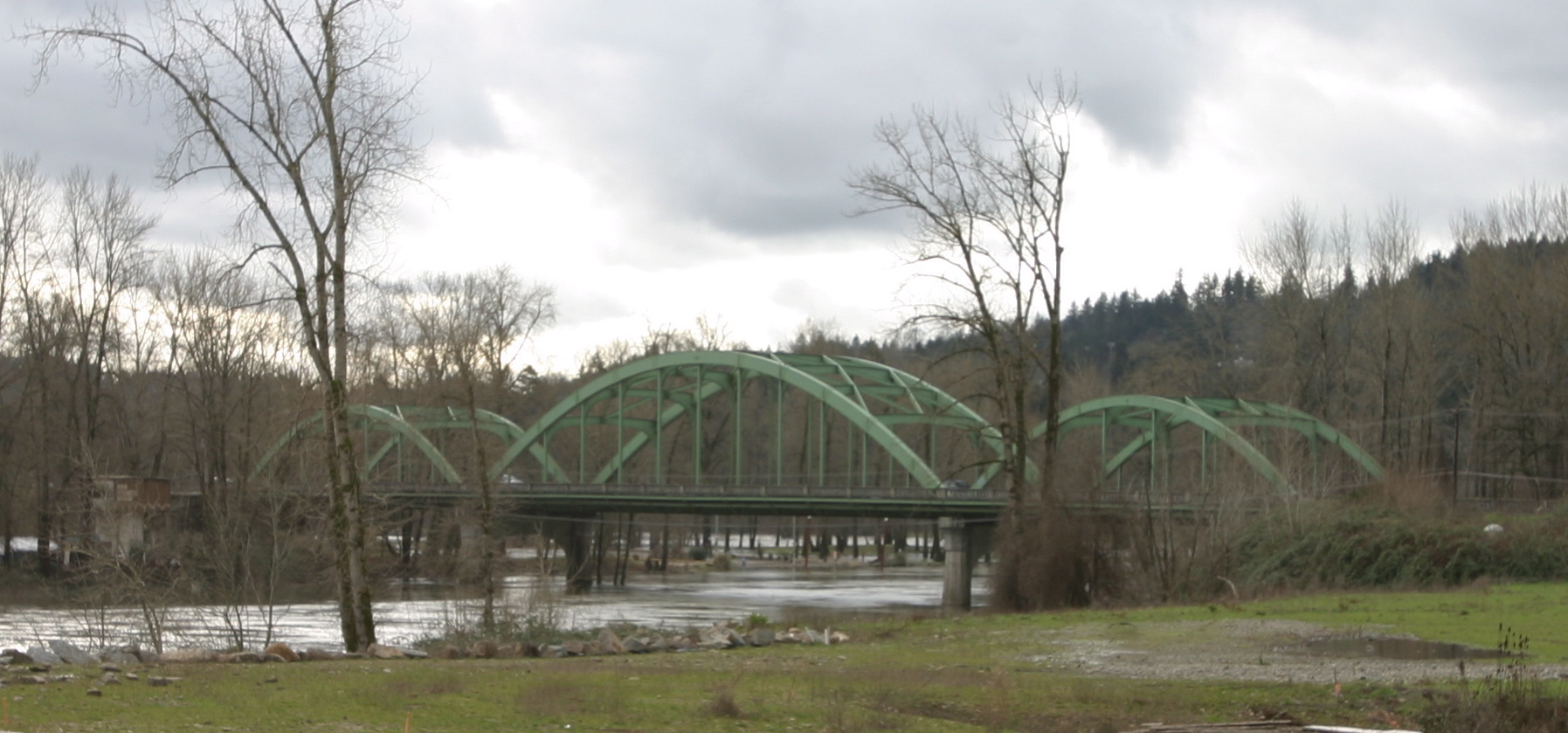
- Coordinates: 45.37322°N 122.60143°W
- Carries: OR 99E (McLoughlin Boulevard)
- Crosses: Clackamas River
- Locale: Oregon City to Gladstone, Oregon
- Maintained by: Oregon DOT

Characteristics
- Design: Through tied-arch
- Total length: 720 ft
- Longest span: 240 ft

History
- Opened: 1933

Location
- Interactive map of John McLoughlin Bridge

The John McLoughlin Bridge is a tied-arch bridge that spans the Clackamas River between Oregon City and Gladstone, Oregon, in the northwest United States. It was designed by Conde McCullough, and named for Dr. John McLoughlin.

It is 720 ft (220 m) long, with a main span of 240 ft (73 m). The deck carries four lanes (two in each direction) of Oregon Route 99E, also known locally as McLoughlin Boulevard.

The bridge won the American Institute of Steel Construction's title of "Most Beautiful Steel Bridge" constructed in 1933. Originally painted black, it was painted "ODOT Green" soon after, the first time that specific color was used on a bridge.

== Sources ==
- Elegant Arches, Soaring Spans: C.B. McCulough, Oregon's Master Bridge Builder, Robert W. Hadlow, Oregon State University Press, 2001. ISBN 0-87071-534-8.
