= Oregon Route 551 =

State highway in western Oregon, US

Oregon Route 551
- Route 551 highlighted in red

Route information
- Maintained by ODOT
- Length: 5.94 mi (9.56 km)
- Existed: 2002–present

Major junctions
- South end: OR 99E near Hubbard
- North end: I-5 near Wilsonville

Location
- Country: United States
- State: Oregon
- Counties: Clackamas, Marion

Highway system
- Oregon Highways; Interstate; US; State; Named; Scenic
← OR 542	→ OR 569

Oregon Route 551 (OR 551) is an Oregon state highway that runs between the cities of Wilsonville and Hubbard. It is known as the Wilsonville-Hubbard Highway No. 51 (see Oregon highways and routes) and is also called the "Hubbard Cutoff." It is 5.94 miles (9.56 km) long, and is a two-lane limited access highway for its entire length.

The designation as OR 551 is a recent addition; for a long time this route did not have a signed route number. In 2002, the Oregon Department of Transportation (ODOT) began assigning route numbers to highways that did not previously have route numbers. As the internal ODOT number assigned this route was already used by OR 51, the number 5 was prefixed to form 551.

== Route description ==
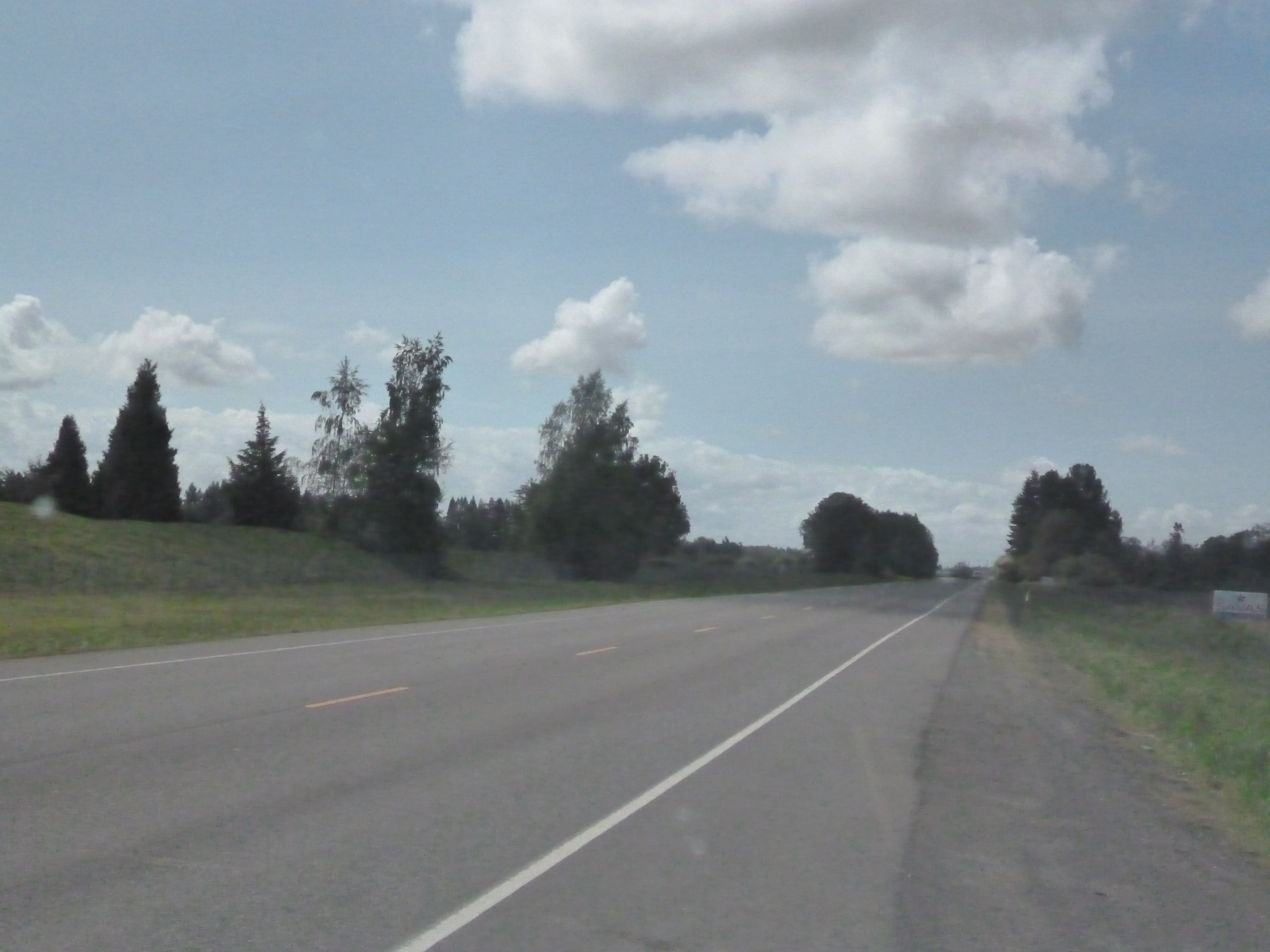
Along Oregon Route 551 near Canby, Oregon.

OR 551 begins (at its southern terminus) at an interchange with OR 99E just north of Hubbard. Whereas OR 99E continues northeast to the cities of Aurora and Canby; OR 551 heads north towards Wilsonville. Its course is almost perfectly straight, and the route has few intersections. OR 551 terminates at an intersection with I-5 near the Charbonneau district just south of Wilsonville.

The highway, when it was first constructed, was originally a part of U.S. Route 99, connecting the Baldock Freeway (which contained US 99, now I-5) with US 99E, now OR 99E. This designation lasted until the freeway was completed between Wilsonville and Salem, at which point the US 99 designation was removed.

Boones Ferry Road, which runs parallel to OR 551 (and connects Woodburn with Portland), was at one time signed as OR 217; portions of this road from northern Wilsonville and Durham are now Oregon Route 141. This road (or the parallel stretch) was the predecessor of OR 551. The road crossed the Willamette River via Boones Ferry near present-day Wilsonville; the ferry has since been replaced by the Boone Bridge, which is where I-5 crosses the river.

== Major intersections ==
County	Location	mi	km	Destinations	Notes
Marion		5.55	8.93	OR 99E south – Woodburn, Salem	Partial interchange; Southern terminus (Southbound ramp to OR 99E south and Northbound ramp from OR 99E north)
Marion		3.43	5.52	Ehlen Road to I-5 / OR 99E – Aurora	Signalized intersection; Complete I-5 interchange is 1.6 miles west, at exit 278; Complete OR 99E junction is 1 mile east, in Aurora
Clackamas		−0.31	−0.50	I-5 north – Portland	Partial interchange; Northern terminus (Northbound ramp to I-5 north and Southbound exit 282A from I-5 south)
1.000 mi = 1.609 km; 1.000 km = 0.621 mi: Incomplete access
