= Wolf Creek, Oregon =

Unincorporated community in the state of Oregon, United States

- Unincorporated community
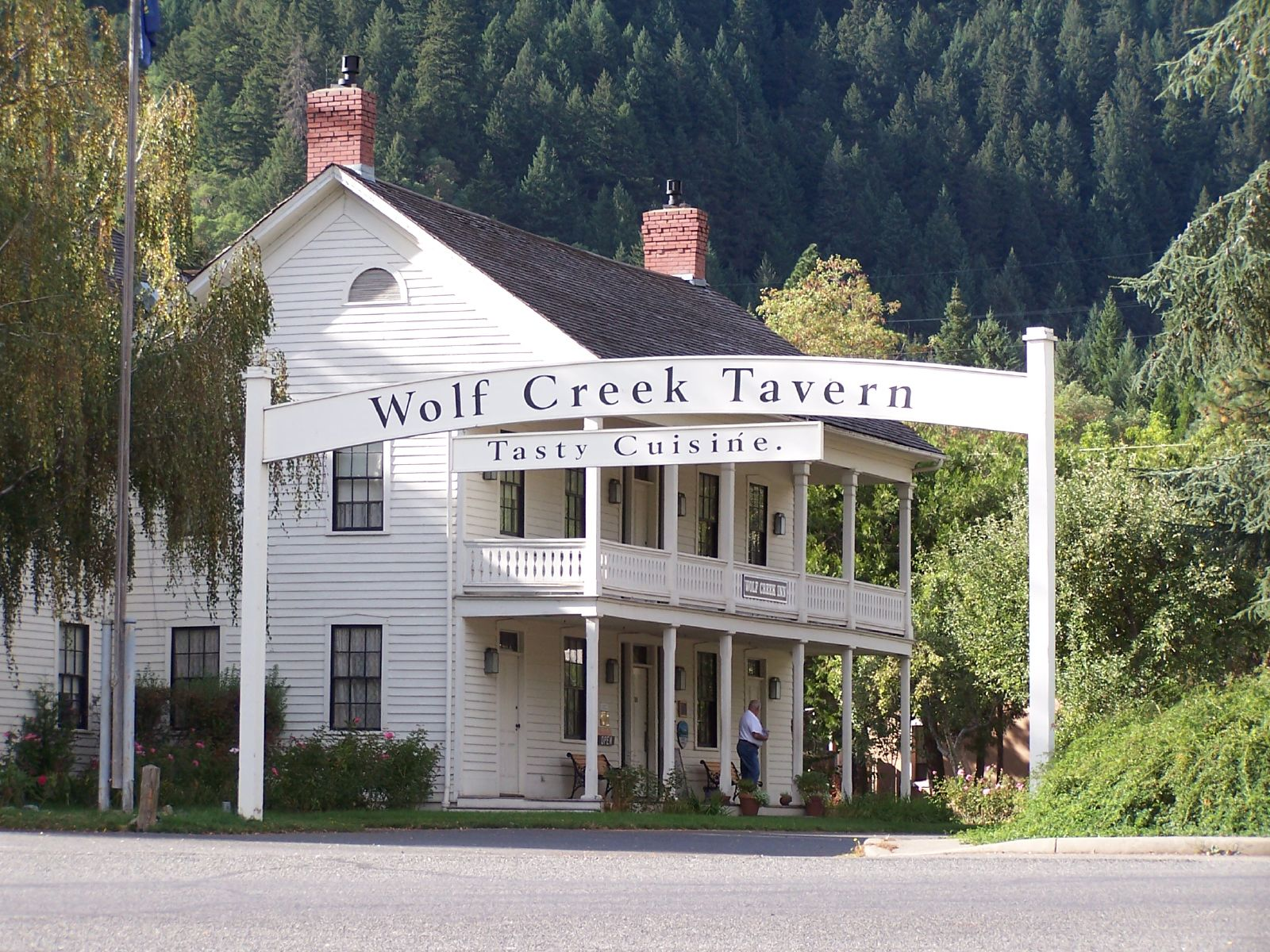
- The tavern at Wolf Creek

- Location within Oregon Location within the United States
- Coordinates: 42°41′44″N 123°23′39″W
- Country: United States
- State: Oregon
- County: Josephine
- Time zone: UTC-8 (Pacific (PST))
  - Summer (DST): UTC-7 (PDT)
- ZIP code: 97497
- Area code: 541

Wolf Creek is an unincorporated community in Josephine County, Oregon, United States, just off Interstate 5.

There are a number of creeks in Oregon named Wolf Creek, after the wolves that were once abundant in the state. Wolf Creek post office was established 1882, while a railroad station called "Almaden" was located in the same place in 1883. The station was renamed to match the post office in 1888, and in 1895 the post office was renamed to "Wolfcreek" until 1951.

The pioneer-era "Six Bit House" was an inn located on the Applegate Trail that passed through the Wolf Creek area long before it had a post office. The original Six Bit House was probably built in 1853, near a hairpin turn of the Southern Pacific Railroad. The inn went through several incarnations until the present Wolf Creek Tavern was built in about 1883. The site, listed on the National Register of Historic Places, is now run by the Oregon State Parks and Recreation Department as the Wolf Creek Inn State Heritage Site and is the oldest continuously operating hotel in the state.

== Climate ==
This region experiences warm (but not hot) and dry summers, with no average monthly temperatures above 71.6 °F (22.0 °C). According to the Köppen climate classification system, Wolf Creek has a warm-summer Mediterranean climate, abbreviated Csb on climate maps.
