= Anlauf, Oregon =

Unincorporated community in the state of Oregon, United States

- Unincorporated community
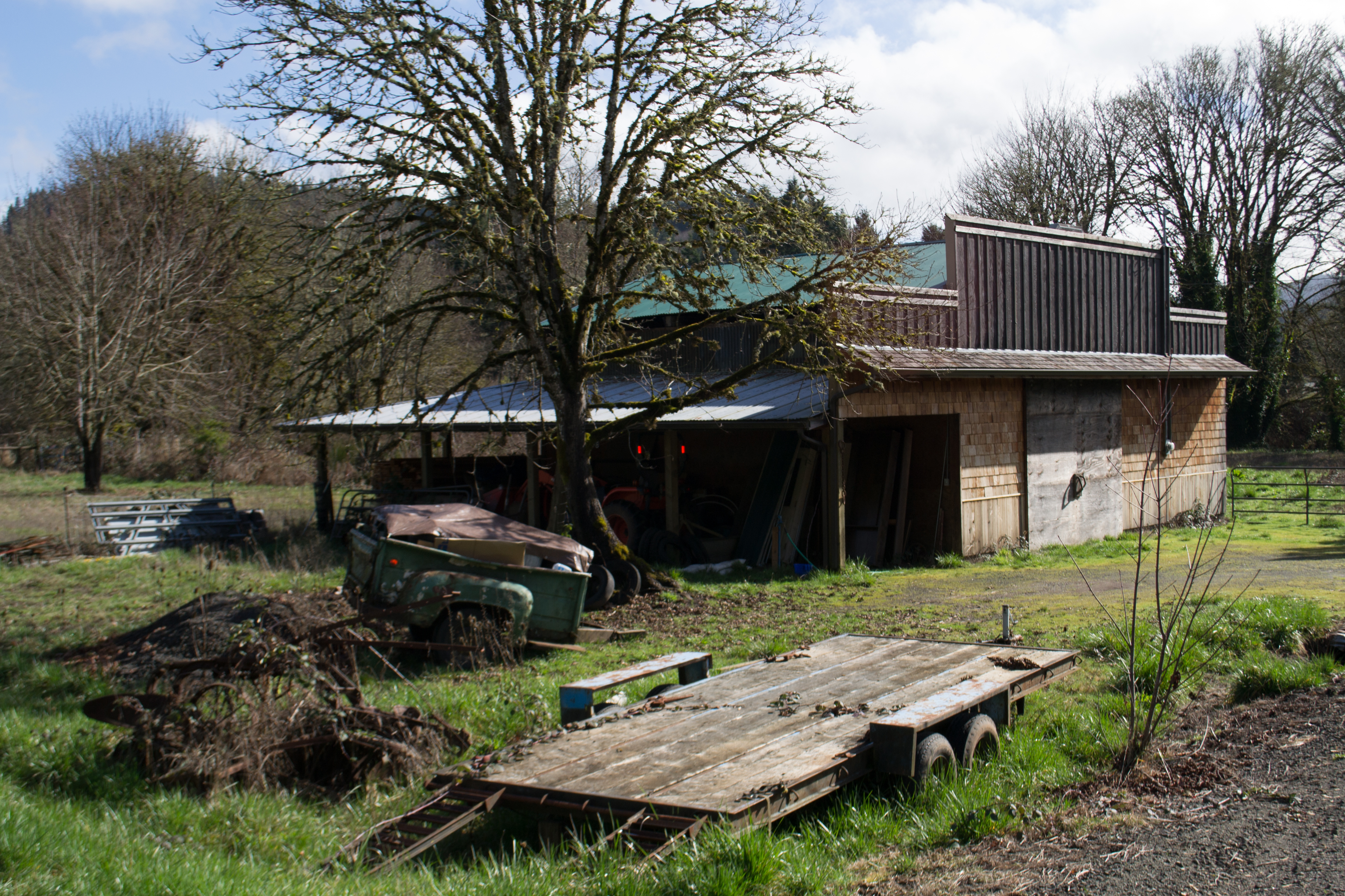
- Old store in Anlauf

- Location within Oregon Location within the United States
- Coordinates: 43°42′39″N 123°13′25″W
- Country: United States
- State: Oregon
- County: Douglas
- Elevation: 390 ft (120 m)
- Time zone: UTC-8 (Pacific (PST))
  - Summer (DST): UTC-7 (PDT)
- Area code: 541
- GNIS feature ID: 1136006

Anlauf is an unincorporated community in Douglas County, Oregon, United States. Anlauf is located along Interstate 5 and Pass Creek north of Yoncalla and seven miles southwest of Curtin.
