= Rice Hill, Oregon =

Unincorporated community in the state of Oregon, United States

- Unincorporated community
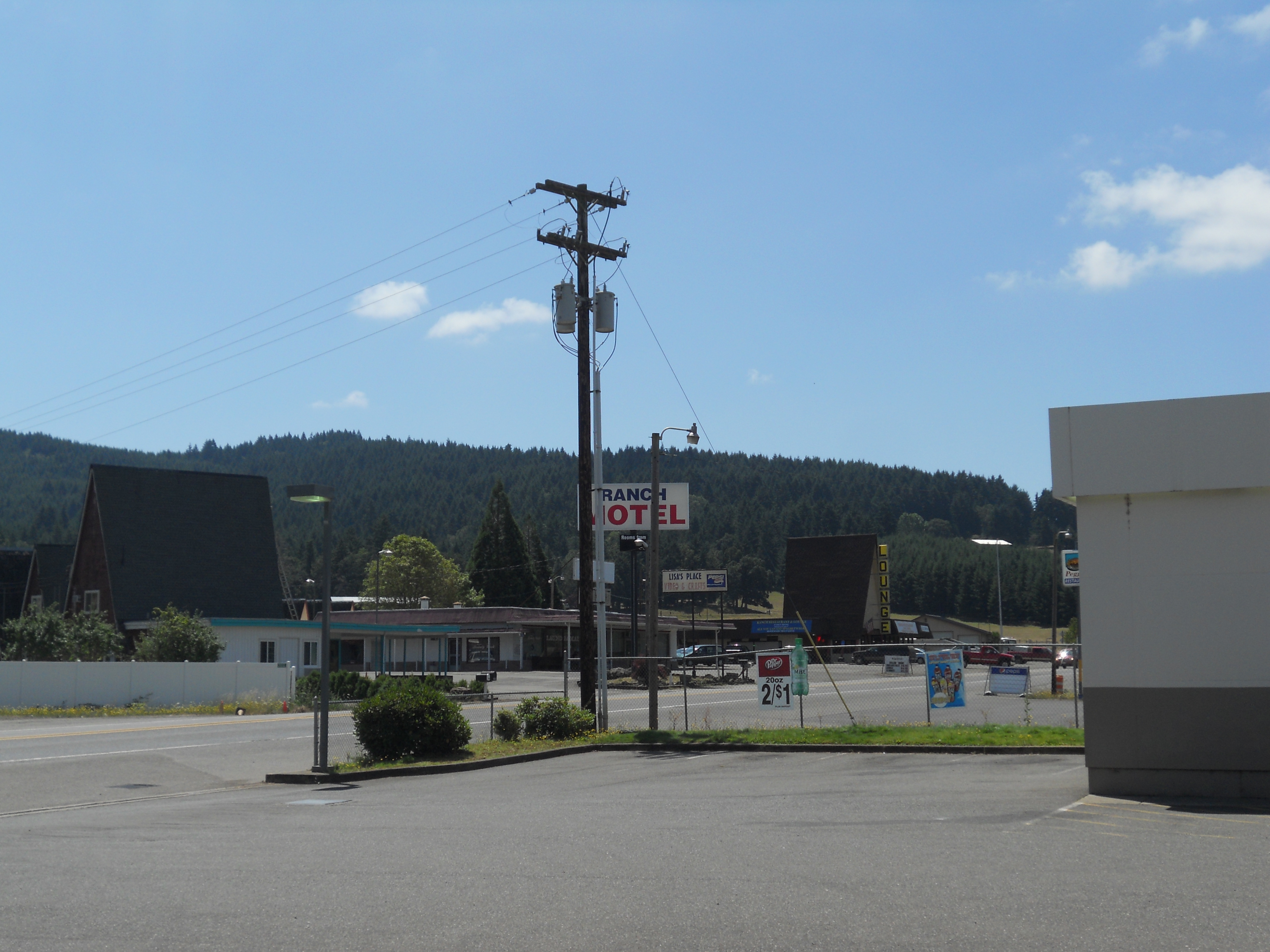
- Rice Hill, Oregon

- Location within Oregon Location within the United States
- Coordinates: 43°32′19″N 123°17′24″W
- Country: United States
- State: Oregon
- County: Douglas
- Elevation: 456 ft (139 m)
- Time zone: UTC-8 (Pacific (PST))
  - Summer (DST): UTC-7 (PDT)
- ZIP code: 97462
- Area codes: 458 and 541
- GNIS feature ID: 1158447

Rice Hill is an unincorporated community in Douglas County, Oregon, United States. It is located about 10 miles (16 km) north of Oakland on Interstate 5. Rice Hill has complete tourist facilities, including a truck stop, motels, and restaurants. It has long been a popular spot to stop for ice cream.

== History ==
Rice Hill was named either for Isadore F. Rice, who settled in the area in the 1850s, or for William S. Rice, who had a Donation Land Claim at the north end of Rice Valley at about the same time. Rice Hill post office was established in 1892, and soon renamed Ricehill. The office closed in 1908. The steep grade of Rice Hill was an obstacle for pioneer travelers and it also created problems for the construction of the railroad.

== Geography ==
Rice Hill is a summit that divides the watersheds of Elk Creek and the Umpqua River. A two-mile long valley stretches south from the community of Rice Hill. Southern Pacific Railroad (today Central Oregon and Pacific Railroad) has a station on its Siskiyou Line at the summit named Rice Hill. The community has an elevation of 710 feet (220 m). It rises 325 feet (99 m) in 3 miles (4.8 km).
