= Hugo, Oregon =

Unincorporated community in the state of Oregon, United States

Coordinates: 42.5845614°N 123.4025633°W

Hugo is an unincorporated community in Josephine County north of Grants Pass, Oregon, United States.

== History ==
Hugo was formerly named "Gravel Pit" and was established in 1883 as a flag station for the railroad. Prior to the railroad, Charles U. Sexton homesteaded what is now the Hugo townsite.

The post office was applied for by Mrs. May Hall Henny in December 1895 under the name of Hugo. The name was chosen from a longtime farmer in the area named Hugo Garbers. Postal records show that the post office moved from its original location to its second on August 22, 1896.

Many residents of what is now Sunny Valley would catch the train at Hugo for Grants Pass, Medford or Glendale in early days before the automobile.

The Hugo area became a large cherry producer and remained so well into the 20th century. One of the esteemed county judges, Garrett Crockett, owned nearby farms for many years until he was gored and killed by one of his bulls.
