= Curtin, Oregon =

Unincorporated community in the state of Oregon, United States

- Unincorporated community
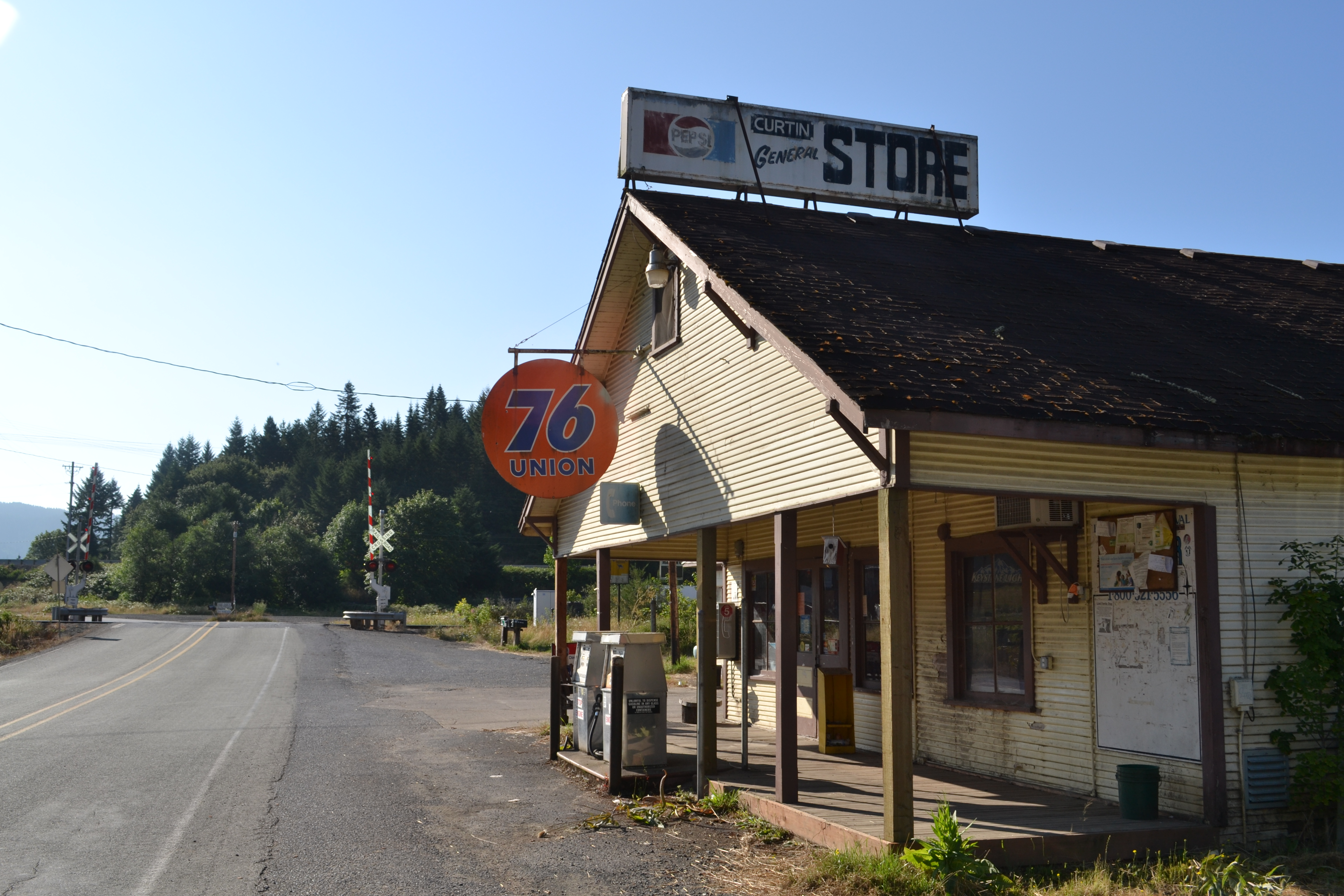
- Curtin general store

- Location within Oregon Location within the United States
- Coordinates: 43°43′20″N 123°12′43″W
- Country: United States
- State: Oregon
- County: Douglas
- Elevation: 404 ft (123 m)
- Time zone: UTC-8 (Pacific (PST))
  - Summer (DST): UTC-7 (PDT)
- ZIP code: 97424
- GNIS feature ID: 1119642

Curtin is an unincorporated community in Douglas County, Oregon, United States. It is on Interstate 5 and the former Southern Pacific railroad line (now Union Pacific) about 7 miles (11 km) northeast of Drain along Pass Creek.

The community was named for Daniel Curtin, who was a local sawmill owner in the 1890s. Curtin post office was established in May 1908. Its ZIP Code was 97428, but as of 2008, Curtin post office had closed out to Cottage Grove.

== Climate ==
This region experiences warm (but not hot) and dry summers, with no average monthly temperatures above 71.6 °F (22.0 °C). According to the Köppen Climate Classification system, Curtin has a warm-summer Mediterranean climate, abbreviated "Csb" on climate maps.
