= Millersburg, Oregon =

City in Oregon

- City
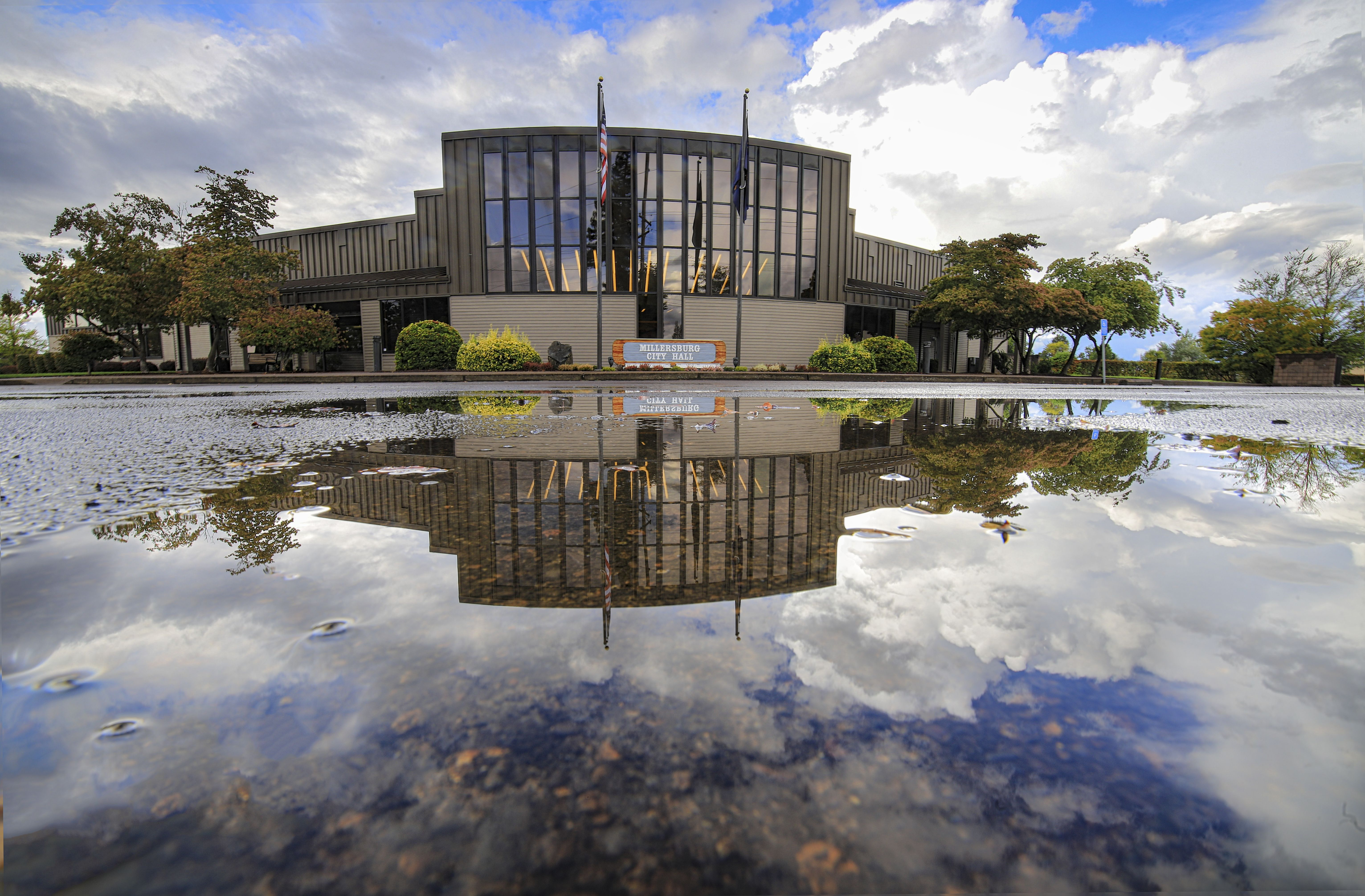
- Millersburg City Hall
- Motto(s): A Community Linking Agriculture and Industry
- Location in Oregon
- Coordinates: 44°40′40″N 123°04′09″W
- Country: United States
- State: Oregon
- County: Linn
- Incorporated: 1974

Government
  - Mayor: Scott Cowen

Area
  - Total: 4.68 sq mi (12.12 km^{2})
  - Land: 4.46 sq mi (11.56 km^{2})
  - Water: 0.22 sq mi (0.56 km^{2})
- Elevation: 220 ft (67 m)

Population (2020)
  - Total: 2,919
  - Density: 654.0/sq mi (252.53/km^{2})
- Time zone: UTC-8 (Pacific)
  - Summer (DST): UTC-7 (Pacific)
- ZIP code: 97321
- Area codes: 458 and 541
- FIPS code: 41-48300
- GNIS feature ID: 2411111
- Website: www.millersburgoregon.gov

Millersburg is a city in Linn County, Oregon, United States. It was originally the name of a station on the Southern Pacific railroad line, which was named for a local farming family. The population was 2,919 at the 2020 census.

== History ==
Millersburg came into being in 1974, to prevent the city of Albany from attempting to extend its city limits to include where Wah Chang Corporation operated a zirconium processing plant for the United States Bureau of Mines.

Although now owned by Allegheny Technologies and until recently known as ATI Wah Chang, this processing plant is the city's largest employer.

Millersburg's infamous stench of past years, often attributed to the Wah Chang facility, was actually generated by the nearby wood products processing mill owned by Weyerhaeuser, and later International Paper. At the end of 2009 International Paper closed the mill, laying off 270 employees. On July 22, 2010, the demolition of the paper mill began with the implosion of the number 4 recovery boiler. By 2012 the remainder of the mill had been demolished.

Millersburg is home to multiple industrial sites including Ti Squared Technologies, a titanium manufacturer, and Arauco, an industrial wood plant. In 2008, Peak Sun Silicon built a 10,000-square-foot (930 m^{2}) polysilicon production facility in Millersburg. However Peak Sun Silicon's land in Oregon was foreclosed on after they were unable to repay a loan from the Oregon Department of Energy. Timberlab, a Cross-laminated timber manufacturer broke ground on a 190,000 square foot manufacturing facility in early 2025.

In 2025 it was announced that Ball Corporation is constructing an aluminum can manufacturing plant in Millersburg, which is expected to open in mid-2026.

== Geography ==
According to the United States Census Bureau, the city has a total area of 4.65 square miles (12.04 km^{2}), of which 4.43 square miles (11.47 km^{2}) is land and 0.22 square miles (0.57 km^{2}) is water.

== Demographics ==
Historical population
Census	Pop.	Note	%±
1980	562		—
1990	715		27.2%
2000	651		−9.0%
2010	1,329		104.1%
2020	2,919		119.6%
U.S. Decennial Census

=== 2020 census ===
As of the 2020 census, Millersburg had a population of 2,919. The median age was 40.2 years. 25.4% of residents were under the age of 18 and 18.0% of residents were 65 years of age or older. For every 100 females there were 101.3 males, and for every 100 females age 18 and over there were 95.4 males age 18 and over.

99.3% of residents lived in urban areas, while 0.7% lived in rural areas.

There were 1,047 households in Millersburg, of which 36.9% had children under the age of 18 living in them. Of all households, 68.9% were married-couple households, 11.0% were households with a male householder and no spouse or partner present, and 14.1% were households with a female householder and no spouse or partner present. About 15.5% of all households were made up of individuals and 7.8% had someone living alone who was 65 years of age or older.

There were 1,080 housing units, of which 3.1% were vacant. Among occupied housing units, 89.3% were owner-occupied and 10.7% were renter-occupied. The homeowner vacancy rate was 0.6% and the rental vacancy rate was 10.4%.

Racial composition as of the 2020 census
Race	Number	Percent
White	2,518	86.3%
Black or African American	5	0.2%
American Indian and Alaska Native	22	0.8%
Asian	47	1.6%
Native Hawaiian and Other Pacific Islander	3	0.1%
Some other race	75	2.6%
Two or more races	249	8.5%
Hispanic or Latino (of any race)	220	7.5%

=== 2010 census ===
As of the census of 2010, there were 1,329 people, 504 households, and 387 families living in the city. The population density was 300.0 inhabitants per square mile (115.8/km^{2}). There were 538 housing units at an average density of 121.4 per square mile (46.9/km^{2}). The racial makeup of the city was 91.9% White, 0.1% African American, 1.1% Native American, 1.4% Asian, 3.0% from other races, and 2.6% from two or more races. Hispanic or Latino of any race were 6.6% of the population.

There were 504 households, of which 34.1% had children under the age of 18 living with them, 65.3% were married couples living together, 7.5% had a female householder with no husband present, 4.0% had a male householder with no wife present, and 23.2% were non-families. 16.7% of all households were made up of individuals, and 6.4% had someone living alone who was 65 years of age or older. The average household size was 2.63 and the average family size was 2.92.

The median age in the city was 41.2 years. 23.6% of residents were under the age of 18; 5.2% were between the ages of 18 and 24; 27.2% were from 25 to 44; 30% were from 45 to 64; and 14.1% were 65 years of age or older. The gender makeup of the city was 50.6% male and 49.4% female.

=== 2000 census ===
As of the census of 2000, there were 651 people, 263 households, and 179 families living in the city. The population density was 145.9 inhabitants per square mile (56.3/km^{2}). There were 288 housing units at an average density of 64.6 per square mile (24.9/km^{2}). The racial makeup of the city was 96.47% White, 0.77% Native American, 0.92% Asian, 0.15% from other races, and 1.69% from two or more races. Hispanic or Latino of any race were 2.76% of the population.

There were 263 households, out of which 30.4% had children under the age of 18 living with them, 59.3% were married couples living together, 6.1% had a female householder with no husband present, and 31.6% were non-families. 25.1% of all households were made up of individuals, and 8.4% had someone living alone who was 65 years of age or older. The average household size was 2.48 and the average family size was 2.98.

In the city, the population was spread out, with 24.4% under the age of 18, 6.0% from 18 to 24, 29.3% from 25 to 44, 29.0% from 45 to 64, and 11.2% who were 65 years of age or older. The median age was 37 years. For every 100 females, there were 105.4 males. For every 100 females age 18 and over, there were 103.3 males.

The median income for a household in the city was $35,469, and the median income for a family was $48,393. Males had a median income of $35,909 versus $25,625 for females. The per capita income for the city was $16,964. About 7.1% of families and 8.7% of the population were below the poverty line, including 5.0% of those under age 18 and 12.9% of those age 65 or over.
