= Oregon Route 42 =

State highway in western Oregon, US

Oregon Route 42
- Route 42; mainline in red, spur route in blue

Route information
- Maintained by ODOT
- Length: 73.32 mi (118.00 km)
- Existed: 1932–present
- Component highways: Coos Bay–Roseburg Highway No. 35

Major junctions
- West end: US 101 near Coos Bay
- OR 99 in Winston
- East end: I-5 in Green

Location
- Country: United States
- State: Oregon

Highway system
- Oregon Highways; Interstate; US; State; Named; Scenic
← OR 39	→ OR 43

Oregon Route 42 (OR 42) is an Oregon state highway which runs between U.S. Route 101 on the Oregon Coast, near Coos Bay, and Green, a few miles south of Roseburg on Interstate 5. OR 42 traverses the Coos Bay–Roseburg Highway No. 35 of the Oregon state highway system. The route splits at Coquille, where Oregon Route 42S heads southwest toward Bandon.

The section of Oregon Route 42 between the junction with U.S. Route 101 south of Coos Bay and the junction with Oregon Route 42S in Coquille was once a part of U.S. Route 101. When U.S. Route 101 was moved to an alignment closer to the ocean in 1961-63, Oregon Route 42 was extended along the northernmost section and Oregon Route 42S was created along the southernmost section.

== Route description ==
OR 42 is known internally by the Oregon Department of Transportation (ODOT) as the Coos Bay-Roseburg Highway No. 35. The entire highway is designated as part of the National Highway System, which includes roadways important to the national economy, defense, and mobility. The entire highway has also been designated as a freight route by ODOT.

== History ==
Coos and Douglas counties began lobbying the state government for major widening and straightening of OR 42 in the late 1940s due to unsafe conditions and heavy use. A group of 140 women from the area appealed directly to the Oregon State Highway Commission in 1957 for improvements, but were turned away.

OR 42 was extended west in December 1960 after US 101 was realigned away from Coquille. A proposal to re-designate the old alignment as U.S. Route 101 Alternate was rejected by the American Association of State Highway Officials in 1971.

=== 2015 landslide ===
On December 23, 2015, a large landslide on a 5-mile-long (8.0 km) section of OR 42 near the Coos–Douglas county line closed the highway to traffic. The section of highway was undergoing part of a $11 million realignment project to straighten the roadway; the area above the slide was clear-cut as part of construction.

== Major intersections ==
Milepoints are as reported by ODOT and do not necessarily reflect current mileage. Z indicates overlapping mileage due to construction longer than established route, and – indicates negative mileage behind established beginning point. Segments that are locally maintained may be omitted. For routes traversing multiple named state highways, each milepoint is preceded by the corresponding state highway number.

County	Location	Milepoint	Destinations	Notes
Coos		0.00	US 101 north – Coos Bay	Interchange
Coos	Coquille	10.85	OR 42S – Bandon, Gold Beach	
Coos		23.48	OR 542 – Powers	Interchange
Douglas	Winston	73.37	OR 99 south – Dillard, Medford	Western end of concurrency with OR 99
Douglas		76.22	OR 99 north – Shady, Roseburg	Eastern end of concurrency with OR 99
Douglas		77.20	I-5 – Grants Pass, Roseburg	Exit 119 on I-5
1.000 mi = 1.609 km; 1.000 km = 0.621 mi: Concurrency terminus

== Spur route ==
Oregon Route 42S
- Location: Bandon–Coquille
- Length: 16.94 mi (27.26 km)

Oregon Route 42S is an Oregon state highway which is located entirely within Coos County. It runs between U.S. Route 101 at Bandon and Coquille on Oregon Route 42. It is known as the Coquille-Bandon Highway No. 244 (see Oregon highways and routes). It serves as an important link between Interstate 5 and the southern Oregon Coast, as it forms the southernmost all-season connection between the two in Oregon. Oregon Route 42S used to be a part of U.S. Route 101, and was created when US 101 was realigned closer to the ocean in 1961-63.
