= Fair Oaks, Oregon =

Unincorporated community in the state of Oregon, United States

- Census-designated place (CDP)
- Location within Oregon Location within the United States
- Coordinates: 43°24′39″N 123°13′10″W
- Country: United States
- State: Oregon
- County: Douglas

Area
  - Total: 1.84 sq mi (4.77 km^{2})
  - Land: 1.84 sq mi (4.77 km^{2})
  - Water: 0 sq mi (0.00 km^{2})
- Elevation: 620 ft (190 m)

Population (2020)
  - Total: 238
  - Density: 129.4/sq mi (49.95/km^{2})
- Time zone: UTC-8 (Pacific (PST))
  - Summer (DST): UTC-7 (PDT)
- Area code: 541
- GNIS feature ID: 2611729

Fair Oaks is an unincorporated community and census-designated place in Douglas County, in the U.S. state of Oregon. It lies at the south end of Driver Valley and along Calapooya Creek, between Sutherlin and Nonpareil by road and upstream from Oakland along the creek. As of the 2020 census, Fair Oaks had a population of 238.

Fair Oaks was named for the oak trees in its vicinity. It had its own post office from 1878 through 1882, and thereafter Fair Oaks mail went via the post office at Oakland.

== Demographics ==
Historical population
Census	Pop.	Note	%±
2020	238		—
U.S. Decennial Census
