= Tyee =

Tyee may refer to:

- Tyee salmon, another name for Chinook salmon, a fish species
- Tyee Mountain, Vancouver Island, British Columbia, Canada
- Tyee, Oregon, United States, an unincorporated community
- A term from Chinook Jargon meaning a leader, chief, or noble.
- Tyee High School, SeaTac, Washington, United States
- The Tyee, an independent online Canadian news magazine that primarily covers British Columbia
- Tyee, a variety of the West Teke language spoken in the Republic of the Congo and Gabon
- Tyee, yearbook of the University of Washington
- Tyee Marina, a marina on Commencement Bay in Tacoma, Washington

== See also ==
- Tyee Formation, a geologic formation in Oregon
- Tyee Sandstone, a geologic formation in Oregon
