= Tenmile, Douglas County, Oregon =

Unincorporated community in the state of Oregon, United States

Coordinates: 43.096226°N 123.564245°W

Tenmile is an unincorporated community in Douglas County, Oregon, United States. It is located on Oregon Route 42 southwest of Roseburg.

Although Tenmile is unincorporated, it has a post office by the same name. The ZIP code is 97481.

== History ==
Tenmile Post Office was so-named because a pioneer drove his cattle from Happy Valley in Douglas County to an area now known as Tenmile Valley. The distance between the two places was about 10 miles. The post office was established in 1870 as "Ten Mile" and changed to "Tenmile" in 1918.

== Notable people ==
- Troy Polamalu - Former professional football player for the Pittsburgh Steelers
