= Douglas County News (Sutherlin) =

- Type: Weekly newspaper
- Owner(s): Becky Holm
- Founder(s): Jean Ivey
- Founded: 2001 (as North County News)
- Language: English
- Ceased publication: 2015
- Headquarters: Sutherlin, Oregon
- Website: douglascountynews.info

The Douglas County News was a weekly newspaper serving Douglas County, Oregon, United States, including the cities of Roseburg, Sutherlin, Winston, and Reedsport. It was published from 2001 to 2015.

== History ==
In July 2001, Jean Ivey started the North County News. She sold the paper in 2007 to Portland entrepreneur Erik Jonsson. He soon bought other papers and started the Winston Reporter and Roseburg Beacon. At some point, Becky Holm was hired by Jonsson as a part-time bookkeeper. She later became editor of the Reporter, which later folded into the Beacon. She then ran the News for less than two months when Jonsson offered to sell her the paper. Holm bought the North County News in February 2008 and changed the name in May 2008 to the Douglas County News. The paper's last issue was published on December 30, 2015.
