= Shady, Oregon =

Unincorporated community in the state of Oregon, United States

Coordinates: 43.174838°N 123.360349°W

Shady is an unincorporated community in Douglas County, Oregon, United States. It is about two miles south of Roseburg on a stretch of Oregon Route 99 also known as the Oakland-Shady Highway. Shady is outside Roseburg's urban growth boundary, but it does have sewer service. Because of sewer availability, Douglas County considers Shady an "urban unincorporated area". It is next to the South Umpqua River.

Like nearby Green, Shady was a station on the Siskiyou Line of the Southern Pacific Railroad. A cliff in the area is named "Shady Point".
