= Douglas County Library System =

- 43°12′45.8″N 123°20′26.1″W
- Location: Douglas County, Oregon, United States
- Type: Public library
- Established: 1953
- Dissolved: June 2017
- Branches: 11

Access and use
- Population served: 107,000
- Members: 8,500

Other information
- Director: Harold Hayes
- Employees: 52
- Website: dclibrary.us

The Douglas County Library System (DCLS) was a public library system in Douglas County, Oregon, United States. The library system was founded in 1953 and operated eleven branches across Douglas County at the time of its closure in 2017.

== History ==
Douglas County's first library was established in 1912 to serve Myrtle Creek. The Myrtle Creek library was followed by other local systems in Roseburg, Reedsport, Glendale, Drain, Yoncalla, and Sutherlin in the 1920s and 1930s.

The Douglas County Library System was established in 1953, based in Roseburg and operating eight branches across the county. Two new libraries were built for Winston and Riddle in the 1960s, and in 1994, a new main branch was opened in Roseburg. The system was funded by the county government, which was heavily reliant on declining sales taxes on timber harvests on federal land, and began budget reductions in 1982. The expiration of the federal Secure Rural Schools program in 2015 further constrained funding for Douglas County, forcing the system to run on grants from the Ford Family Foundation until a public vote on funding could be held in 2016.

The Douglas County Board of Commissioners voted in June 2016 to place a ballot measure asking to create a public library district and fund it using a property tax of 44 cents per $1,000 in assessed value. During the November 2016 election, the library ballot measure was rejected by 55 percent of Douglas County voters. After the failure of the ballot measure, the county government sought other funding solutions, opting to run through the end of June with funds from the county's general fund.

The ten branch locations of the library system closed on April 1, 2017. The Roseburg main branch closed on May 31, 2017, and library supporters held a wake during its final evening in service.

The Douglas County system became the third county library system in Oregon to be closed, after Jackson and Josephine counties closed their systems in 2007. Both systems later re-opened under non-government management in limited capacity.

== Branches ==
At the time of its closure in 2017, the system operated eleven branches in the cities of Canyonville, Drain, Glendale, Myrtle Creek, Oakland, Reedsport, Riddle, Roseburg, Sutherlin, Winston, and Yoncalla. The Sutherlin Library was reopened by volunteers one day following the April closure. By the following year, nine branches had reopened under the care of volunteers with grants from city governments as well as private donations and fundraisers. The City of Roseburg reopened its library in January 2019, following a year of planning.
