= Kellogg, Oregon =

Unincorporated community in the state of Oregon, United States

- Unincorporated community
- Location within Oregon Location within the United States
- Coordinates: 43°33′18″N 123°33′18″W
- Country: United States
- State: Oregon
- County: Douglas
- Elevation: 200 ft (61 m)
- Time zone: UTC-8 (Pacific (PST))
  - Summer (DST): UTC-7 (PDT)
- ZIP code: 97462
- Area codes: 458 and 541
- GNIS feature ID: 1122659

Kellogg, Oregon is an unincorporated community on the Umpqua River in Douglas County, Oregon, United States. It was named for brothers Lyman and Adna Barnes Kellogg. The post office operated from January 17, 1879 to 1921. Adna was its first postmaster.
