= Mercy Medical Center (Roseburg, Oregon) =

Coordinates: 43.241°N 123.366°W

- Catholic Health Initiatives
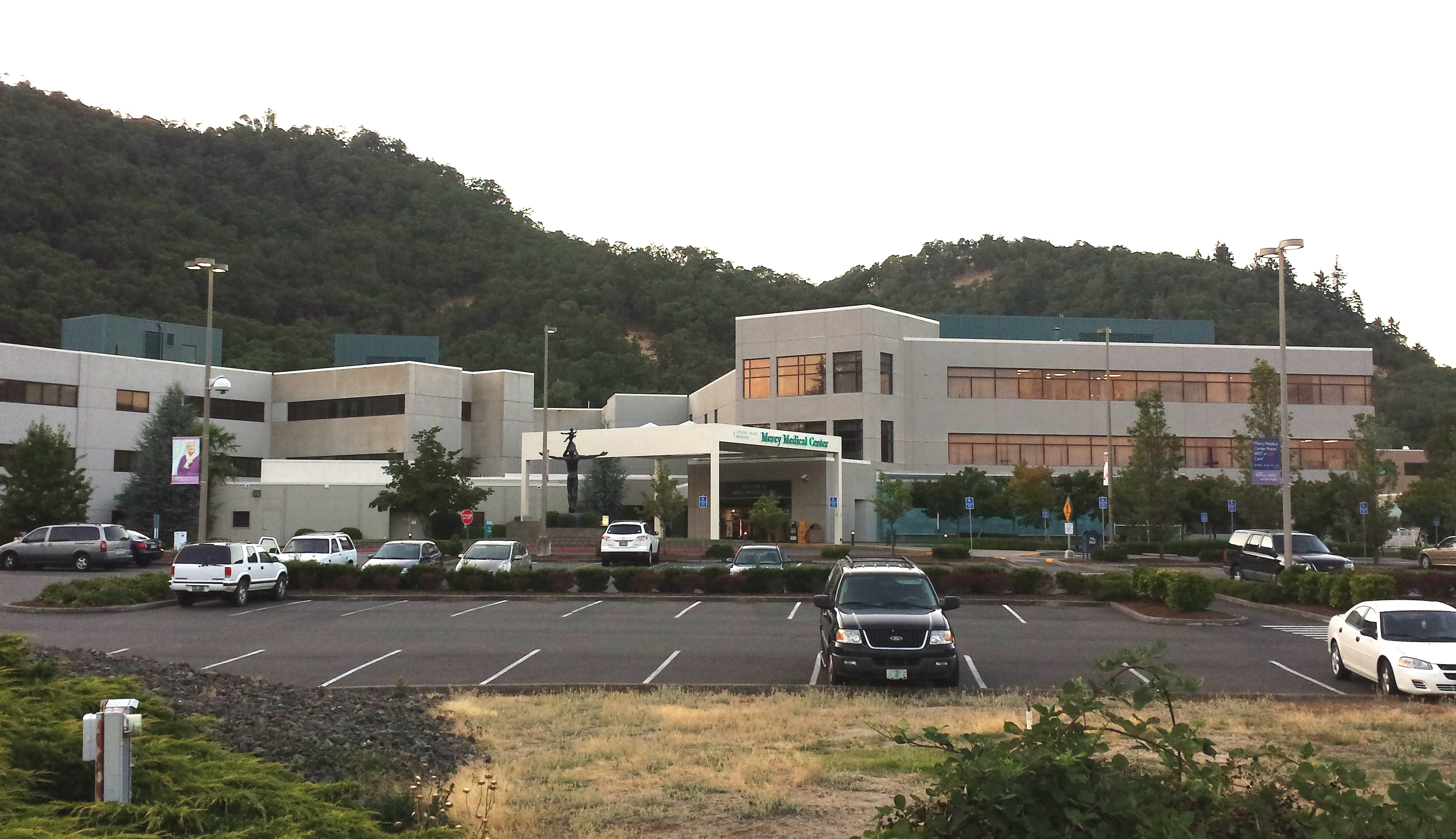
- Mercy Medical Center in July 2013.

Geography
- Location: Roseburg, Oregon, United States

Organization
- Type: Community
- Affiliated university: Catholic

Services
- Emergency department: Level III trauma center
- Beds: 174

Helipads
- Helipad: Yes

History
- Founded: 1909

Links
- Website: www.chimercyhealth.com
- Lists: Hospitals in Oregon

Mercy Medical Center is a rural non-profit community hospital located in the city of Roseburg, in the US State of Oregon. Mercy Medical Center has 171 licensed beds on a 90-acre (36 ha) campus, and the hospital has a heliport for patients arriving to the emergency department via helicopter. The hospital is accredited by the Joint Commission on Accreditation of Healthcare Organizations. Mercy Medical Center is 1 of 2 hospitals in Douglas County, Oregon, Lower Umpqua Hospital in Reedsport being the other, and has been since 2000. With 1,139 employees, the hospital is the second largest employer in the county, and in Roseburg.

In the most recent year with available data, Mercy Medical Center had 45,870 emergency department visits, 7,180 admissions, 1,679 inpatient surgeries, and 584 outpatient surgeries. Mercy Medical Center uses the electronic health record MEDITECH.

== History ==
The hospital was started by the Sisters of Mercy in 1909. At the time, the hospital contained 25 beds. In the year 2000, Douglas Community Hospital closed its doors, making Mercy Medical Center the only hospital in Douglas County, Oregon.

In 2007, Mercy Medical Center closed its behavioral health unit because of costs.
