= Nonpareil, Oregon =

Unincorporated community in the state of Oregon, United States

Coordinates: 43.407619°N 123.168126°W

Nonpareil is an unincorporated historic community in Douglas County, Oregon, United States. It is about 8 miles (13 km) east of Sutherlin, near Calapooya Creek. The population of the area was about 202 in 2000. Nonpareil was the birthplace of novelist H. L. Davis.

Nonpareil was named for the nearby Nonpareil quicksilver (mercury) mine, discovered between 1865 and 1870, which at one time was very productive. The mine is no longer in operation, having closed in 1932. "Nonpareil" is French for "unrivaled" or "unique". Nonpareil post office ran from 1882 to 1884. During the height of the mining era, the short-lived town also had a dance hall and a school. The nearby Bonanza Mine also contributed to the town's economy. As of 1990, Nonpareil had a store and no other amenities. Author Ralph Friedman noted that the store's name was misspelled "Nonpariel". By 2003, the store, which at one time had a gas station, was closed.

The area of the mining operations is now owned by Swanson Superior Forest Products of Noti, who purchased the land from Weyerhaeuser in 1990. Besides rural residential use, grazing and timber production take place in the Nonpareil area. An abandoned logging railroad grade passes through the town. The roadbed was built beginning in the early 1900s by the Roach Timber Company using mine tailings from the Bonanza mercury mine. Weyerhaeuser bought the railroad in 1949 and lengthened the railroad grade, also using mine tailings. The railroad was decommissioned in 1966, the ties and tracks removed, and portions of the grade, now known as the "Red Rock Road" were sold. Weyerhaeuser is now working with the Oregon Department of Environmental Quality to mitigate the effects of the arsenic-laced soil of the roadbed on local residents.
