= Cleveland, Oregon =

Unincorporated community in the state of Oregon, United States

- Unincorporated community
- Location within Oregon Location within the United States
- Coordinates: 43°17′46″N 123°28′35″W
- Country: United States
- State: Oregon
- County: Douglas
- Elevation: 446 ft (136 m)
- Time zone: UTC-8 (Pacific (PST))
  - Summer (DST): UTC-7 (PDT)
- ZIP code: 97462
- Area codes: 458 and 541
- GNIS feature ID: 1119014

Cleveland is an unincorporated community located in Douglas County, Oregon. The Umpqua River flows past a quarter of a mile to the east of the community.
