= Dixonville, Oregon =

Unincorporated community in Oregon, US

- Unincorporated community
- Location within Oregon Location within the United States
- Coordinates: 43.2076169°N 123.2411773°W
- Country: United States
- State: Oregon
- County: Douglas
- Elevation: 200 ft (61 m)
- Time zone: UTC-8 (Pacific (PST))
  - Summer (DST): UTC-7 (PDT)
- ZIP code: 97462
- Area codes: 458 and 541

Dixonville is an unincorporated community in Douglas County, Oregon.
