= Round Prairie, Oregon =

Unincorporated community in the state of Oregon, United States

- Unincorporated community
- Location within Oregon Location within the United States
- Coordinates: 43°05′17″N 123°22′10″W
- Country: United States
- State: Oregon
- County: Douglas
- Elevation: 568 ft (173 m)
- Time zone: UTC-8 (Pacific (PST))
  - Summer (DST): UTC-7 (PDT)
- Area code: 541
- GNIS feature ID: 1136712

Round Prairie is an unincorporated community in Douglas County, Oregon, United States. Round Prairie is located along Interstate 5 north of Myrtle Creek. The extent of the business district is at I-5 Exit 113.
