= Douglas County, Oregon =

County in Oregon, United States

- County
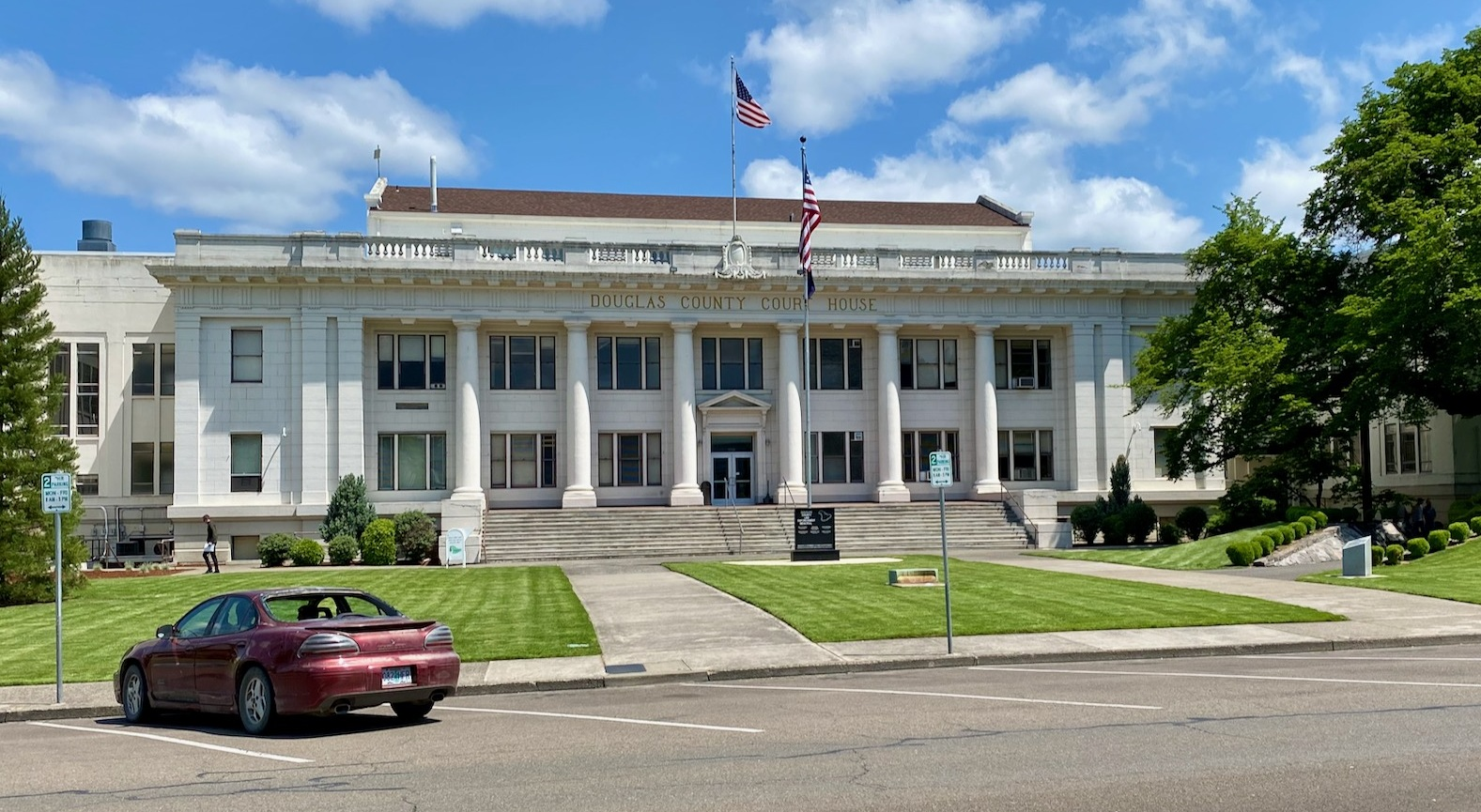
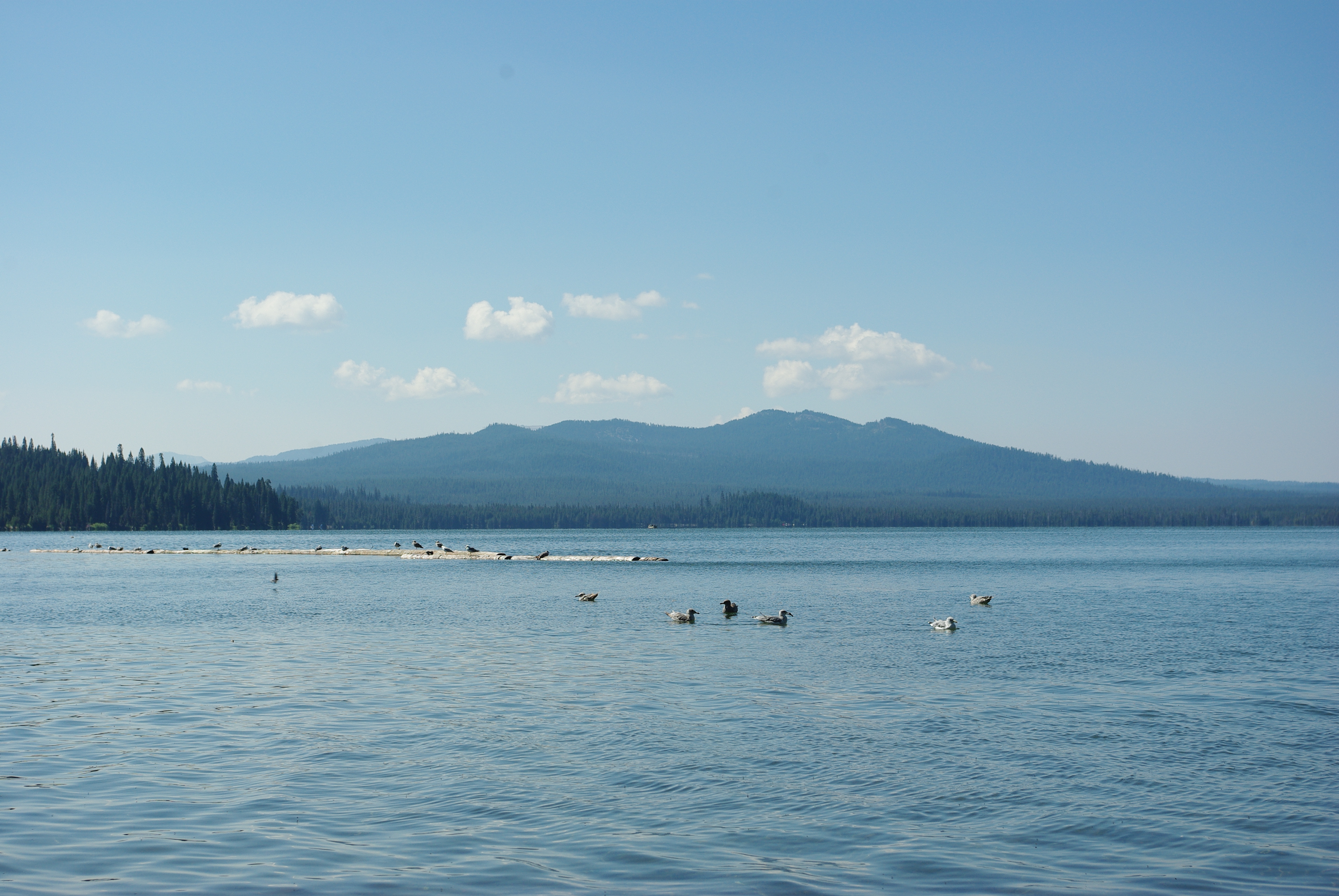
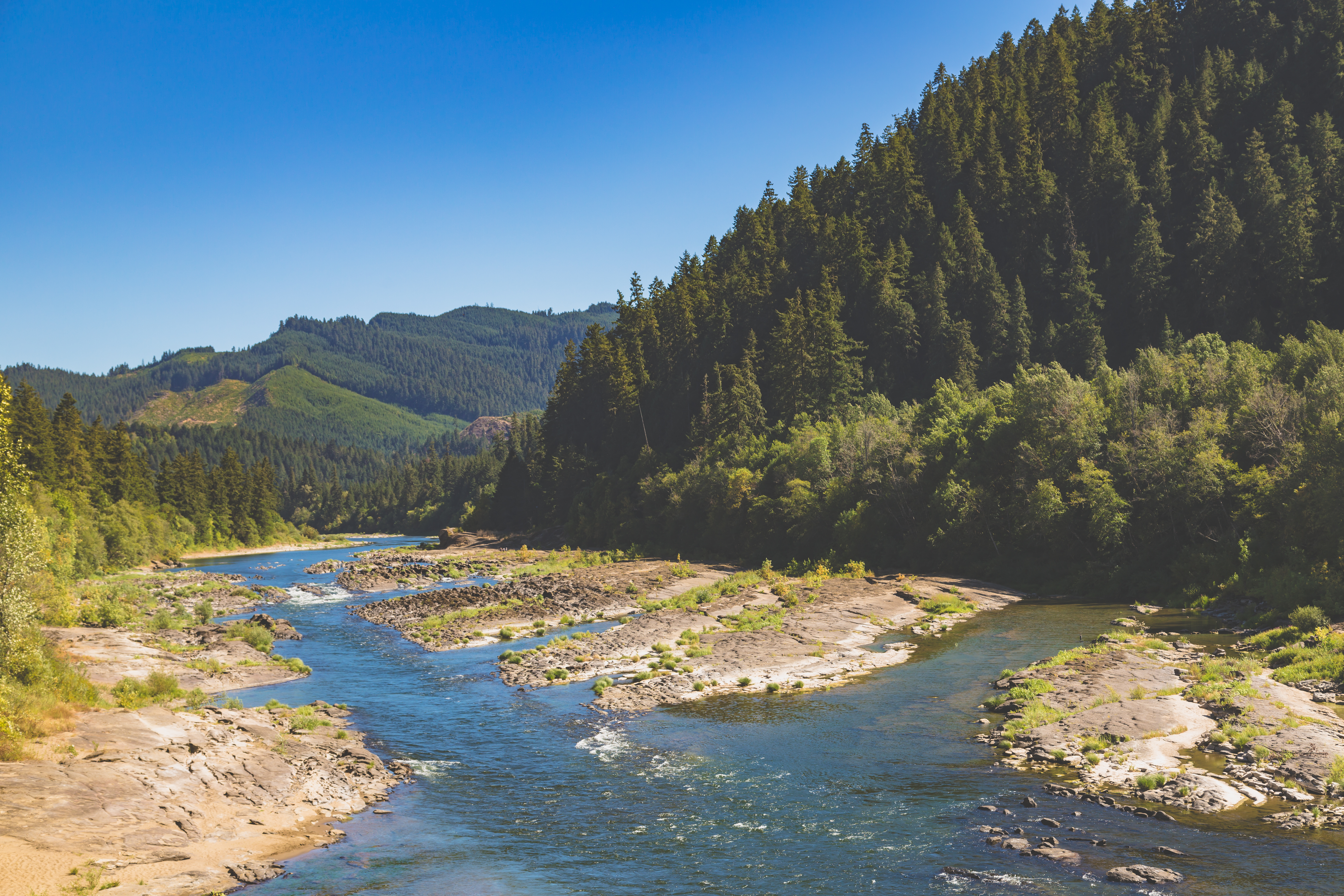
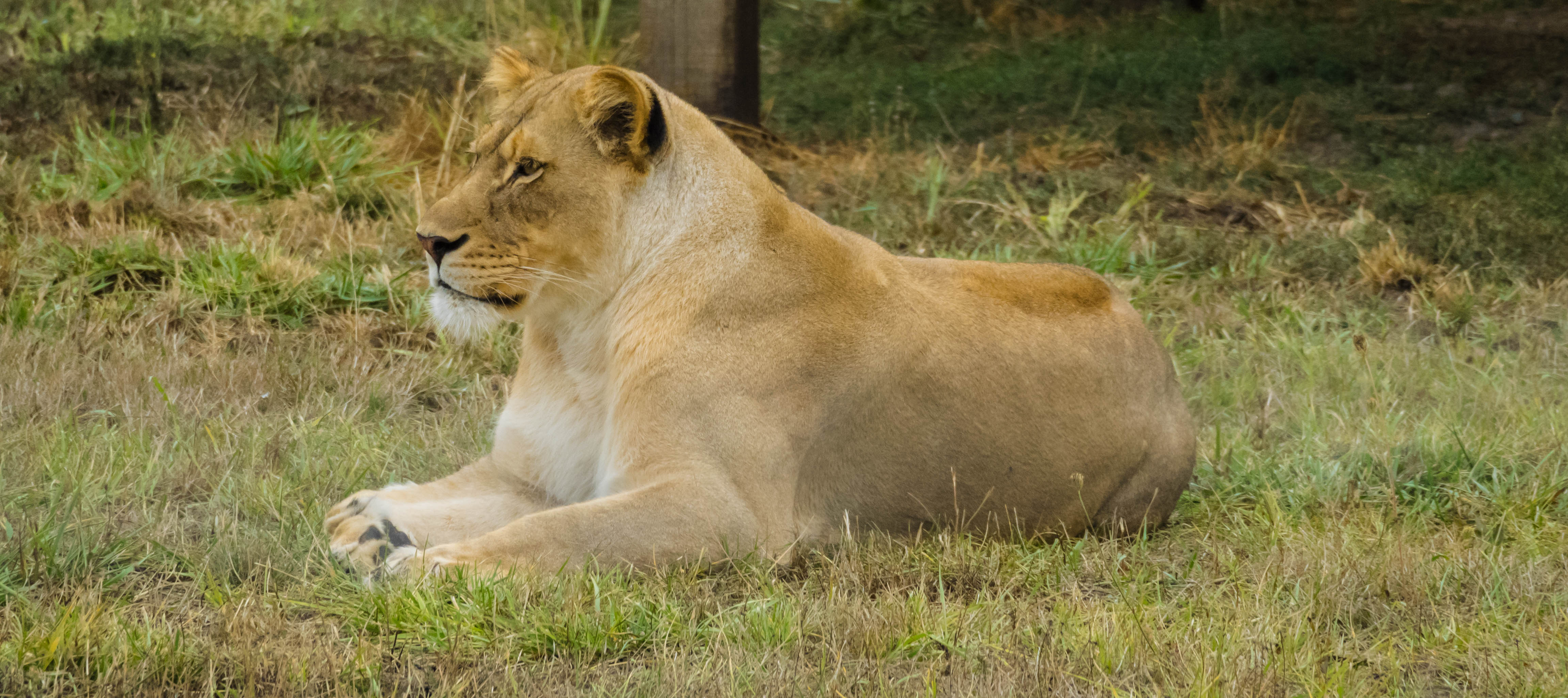
- Douglas County Courthouse, Roseburg Roseburg Diamond Lake Umpqua River Oregon Wildlife Safari

- Location within the U.S. state of Oregon
- Coordinates: 43°17′N 123°11′W
- Country: United States
- State: Oregon
- Founded: January 7, 1852
- Named for: Stephen A. Douglas
- Seat: Roseburg
- Largest city: Roseburg

Area
  - Total: 5,134 sq mi (13,300 km^{2})
  - Land: 5,036 sq mi (13,040 km^{2})
  - Water: 98 sq mi (250 km^{2}) 1.9%

Population (2020)
  - Total: 111,201
  - Estimate (2025): 111,951 ▲
  - Density: 22.08/sq mi (8.526/km^{2})
- Time zone: UTC−8 (Pacific)
  - Summer (DST): UTC−7 (PDT)
- Congressional districts: 2nd, 4th
- Website: douglascountyor.gov

Map of Douglas County

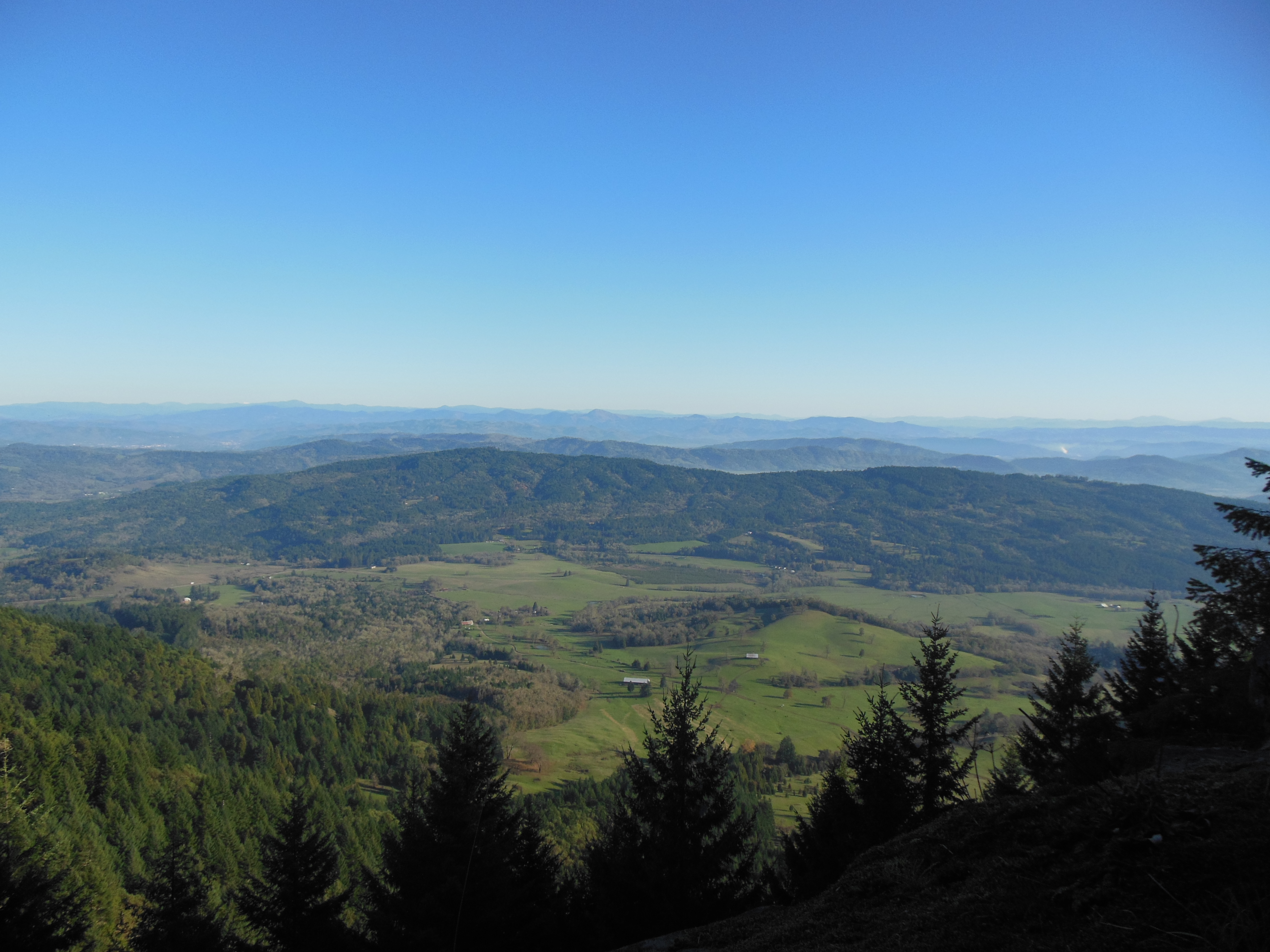
The county, looking east from west of Roseburg

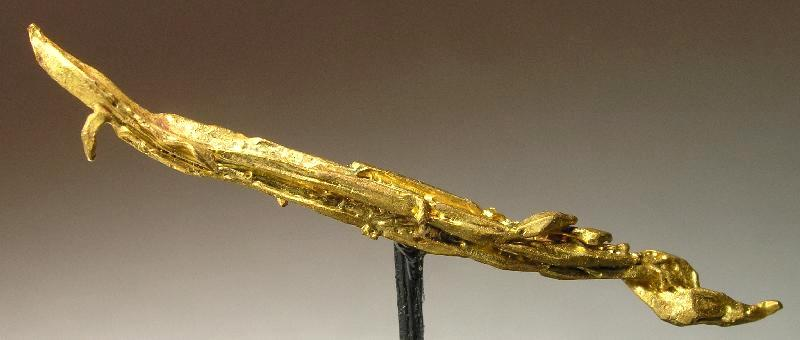
A gold "needle" from the Bohemia District in Douglas County

Douglas County is one of the 36 counties in the U.S. state of Oregon. As of the 2020 census, the population was 111,201. The county seat is Roseburg. The county is named after Stephen A. Douglas, an American politician who supported Oregon statehood. Douglas County comprises the Roseburg, Oregon micropolitan statistical area. In area, Douglas County is the largest county west of the Oregon Cascades.

== History ==
The area originally was inhabited by the Umpqua Indians, a grouping of natives who spoke a variety of Penutian and Athabaskan languages. Following the Rogue River Wars in 1856, most of the remaining natives were moved by the federal government to the Grand Ronde Indian Reservation. However, seven families of Umpqua hid in the hills, eluding capture for many decades. They are now federally recognized as the Cow Creek Band of Umpqua Tribe of Indians. The tribe manages a small reservation in Canyonville, Oregon, and operates the Seven Feathers Casino Resort, named to represent the seven families who refused forced removal to the Grand Ronde Reservation.

Douglas County was created on January 7, 1852, from the portion of Umpqua County which lay east of the Coast Range summit. In 1856 the Camas Valley was annexed to Douglas County from Coos County. In 1862, the rest of Umpqua county was absorbed into Douglas County, some say due to the loss of population following the end of the early gold boom, while others attribute the absorption to politics. Further boundary adjustments were made with Jackson and Lane Counties in 1915. The borders of Douglas County are largely defined by the Umpqua River watershed.

In 2017, after the defeat of a referendum, the Douglas County Library System ceased operations and all public libraries in the county were closed. Subsequently, ten of the cities in the county reopened their libraries to continue serving their communities.

== Geography ==
According to the United States Census Bureau, the county has a total area of 5,134 square miles (13,300 km^{2}), of which 5,036 square miles (13,040 km^{2}) is land and 98 square miles (250 km^{2}) (1.9%) is water. It is the fifth-largest county in Oregon by area. A portion of the Umpqua National Forest is in Douglas County. Douglas County is one of two Oregon counties that extend from the Pacific Ocean to the Cascade Range, the other is Lane County.

=== National protected areas ===
- Crater Lake National Park (part)
- Rogue River–Siskiyou National Forest (part)
- Siuslaw National Forest (part)
- Umpqua National Forest (part)
- Willamette National Forest (part)

=== Adjacent counties ===
- Lane County (north)
- Klamath County (east)
- Jackson County (south)
- Josephine County (south)
- Curry County (southwest)
- Coos County (west)

== Demographics ==
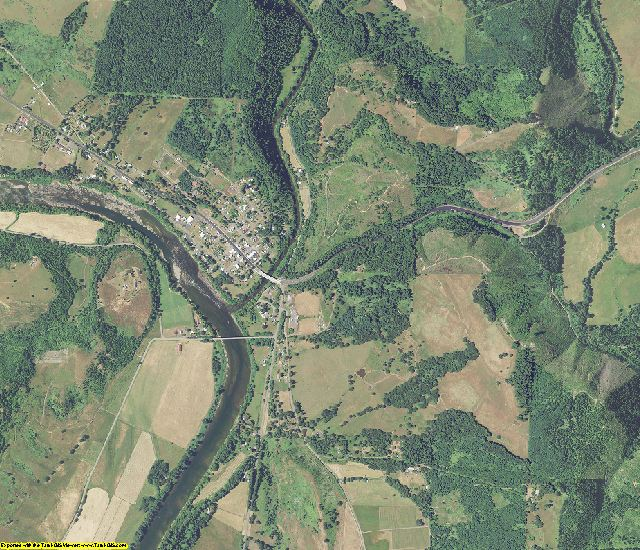
An aerial view of the county

Historical population
Census	Pop.	Note	%±
1860	3,203		—
1870	6,066		89.4%
1880	9,596		58.2%
1890	11,864		23.6%
1900	14,565		22.8%
1910	19,674		35.1%
1920	21,332		8.4%
1930	21,965		3.0%
1940	25,728		17.1%
1950	54,549		112.0%
1960	68,458		25.5%
1970	71,743		4.8%
1980	93,748		30.7%
1990	94,649		1.0%
2000	100,399		6.1%
2010	107,667		7.2%
2020	111,201		3.3%
2025 (est.)	111,951	▲	0.7%
U.S. Decennial Census; 1790–1960 1900–1990; 1990–2000 2010–2020

=== 2020 census ===
Douglas County, Oregon – Racial and ethnic composition Note: the US Census treats Hispanic/Latino as an ethnic category. This table excludes Latinos from the racial categories and assigns them to a separate category. Hispanics/Latinos may be of any race.
Race / Ethnicity (NH = Non-Hispanic)	Pop 1980	Pop 1990	Pop 2000	Pop 2010	Pop 2020	% 1980	% 1990	% 2000	% 2010	% 2020
White alone (NH)	90,243	90,196	92,302	96,343	93,525	96.26%	95.30%	91.94%	89.48%	84.10%
Black or African American alone (NH)	127	140	165	279	383	0.14%	0.15%	0.16%	0.26%	0.34%
Native American or Alaska Native alone (NH)	1,122	1,428	1,446	1,799	1,694	1.20%	1.51%	1.44%	1.67%	1.52%
Asian alone (NH)	453	629	601	1,008	1,185	0.48%	0.66%	0.60%	0.94%	1.07%
Native Hawaiian or Pacific Islander alone (NH)	x	x	83	110	151	x	x	0.08%	0.10%	0.14%
Other race alone (NH)	56	31	86	154	532	0.06%	0.03%	0.09%	0.14%	0.48%
Mixed race or Multiracial (NH)	x	x	2,433	2,919	7,077	x	x	2.42%	2.71%	6.36%
Hispanic or Latino (any race)	1,747	2,225	3,283	5,055	6,654	1.86%	2.35%	3.27%	4.70%	5.98%
Total	93,748	94,649	100,399	107,667	111,201	100.00%	100.00%	100.00%	100.00%	100.00%

=== American Community Survey 2025 data ===
The United States Census Bureau estimated that in 2025, Douglas County’s population was 111.951. It was also estimated that the county's population was 83,57% Non-Hispanic White, 7,48% Hispanic or Latino, 0,49% Non-Hispanic Black, 1,25% Asian, 1,66% Native American, 0,15% Pacific Islander, and 5,40% Multiracial.

Total	Population	Percentage
Non-Hispanic White	93.563	83,57%
Hispanic or Latino	8.375	7,48%
Non-Hispanic Black	551	0,49%
Asian	1.397	1,25%
Native American	1.855	1,66%
Pacific Islander	164	0,15%
Non-Hispanic Multiracial	6.046	5,40%

As of the 2020 census, the county had a population of 111,201. Of the residents, 19.1% were under the age of 18 and 26.8% were 65 years of age or older; the median age was 48.1 years. For every 100 females there were 98.0 males, and for every 100 females age 18 and over there were 96.5 males. 59.6% of residents lived in urban areas and 40.4% lived in rural areas.

The racial makeup of the county was 86.4% White, 0.4% Black or African American, 1.8% American Indian and Alaska Native, 1.1% Asian, 0.1% Native Hawaiian and Pacific Islander, 1.9% from some other race, and 8.4% from two or more races. Hispanic or Latino residents of any race comprised 6.0% of the population.

There were 45,817 households in the county, of which 23.7% had children under the age of 18 living with them and 24.8% had a female householder with no spouse or partner present. About 27.6% of all households were made up of individuals and 14.9% had someone living alone who was 65 years of age or older.

There were 49,774 housing units, of which 7.9% were vacant. Among occupied housing units, 70.1% were owner-occupied and 29.9% were renter-occupied. The homeowner vacancy rate was 1.8% and the rental vacancy rate was 5.1%.

=== 2010 census ===
As of the 2010 census, there were 107,667 people, 44,581 households, and 29,839 families living in the county. The population density was 21.4 inhabitants per square mile (8.3 inhabitants/km^{2}). There were 48,915 housing units at an average density of 9.7 units per square mile (3.7 units/km^{2}). The racial makeup of the county was 92.4% white, 1.8% American Indian, 1.0% Asian, 0.3% black or African American, 0.1% Pacific islander, 1.2% from other races, and 3.2% from two or more races. Those of Hispanic or Latino origin made up 4.7% of the population. In terms of ancestry, 25.6% were German, 16.7% were Irish, 15.8% were English, and 5.7% were American.

Of the 44,581 households, 26.4% had children under the age of 18 living with them, 51.2% were married couples living together, 10.8% had a female householder with no husband present, 33.1% were non-families, and 26.6% of all households were made up of individuals. The average household size was 2.38 and the average family size was 2.82. The median age was 46.1 years.

The median income for a household in the county was $39,711 and the median income for a family was $48,729. Males had a median income of $39,308 versus $28,176 for females. The per capita income for the county was $21,342. About 10.6% of families and 15.6% of the population were below the poverty line, including 24.1% of those under age 18 and 9.0% of those age 65 or over.

=== 2000 census ===
As of the 2000 census, there were 100,399 people, 39,821 households, and 28,233 families living in the county. The population density was 20 people per square mile (7.7 people/km^{2}). There were 43,284 housing units at an average density of 9 units per square mile (3.5/km^{2}). The racial makeup of the county was 93.86% White, 0.18% Black or African American, 1.52% Native American, 0.63% Asian, 0.09% Pacific Islander, 1.02% from other races, and 2.70% from two or more races. 3.27% of the population were Hispanic or Latino of any race. 18.4% were of German, 13.2% American, 12.6% English and 10.2% Irish ancestry. 96.5% spoke English and 2.2% Spanish as their first language.

There were 39,821 households, out of which 29.10% had children under the age of 18 living with them, 57.2% were married couples living together, 9.6% had a female householder with no husband present, and 29.1% were non-families. 23.9% of all households were made up of individuals, and 11% had someone living alone who was 65 years of age or older. The average household size was 2.48 and the average family size was 2.9.

In the county, the population was spread out, with 24% under the age of 18, 7.5% from 18 to 24, 24.2% from 25 to 44, 26.4% from 45 to 64, and 17.8% who were 65 years of age or older. The median age was 41 years. For every 100 females there were 96.8 males. For every 100 females age 18 and over, there were 94.2 males.

The median income for a household in the county was $33,223, and the median income for a family was $39,364. Males had a median income of $32,512 versus $22,349 for females. The per capita income for the county was $16,581. About 9.6% of families and 13.1% of the population were below the poverty line, including 16.6% of those under age 18 and 9.2% of those age 65 or over.

== Communities ==
=== Cities ===
- Canyonville
- Drain
- Elkton
- Glendale
- Myrtle Creek
- Oakland
- Reedsport
- Riddle
- Roseburg (county seat)
- Sutherlin
- Winston
- Yoncalla

=== Census-designated places ===
- Days Creek
- Dillard
- Fair Oaks
- Gardiner
- Glide
- Green
- Lookingglass
- Melrose
- Roseburg North
- Tri-City
- Winchester Bay

=== Unincorporated communities ===
- Anlauf
- Ash
- Azalea
- Brockway
- Camas Valley
- Clearwater
- Cleveland
- Curtin
- Diamond Lake
- Dixonville
- Drew
- Edenbower
- Elkhead
- Idleyld Park
- Kellogg
- Leona
- Milo
- Nonpareil
- Peel
- Rice Hill
- Round Prairie
- Scottsburg
- Shady
- Steamboat
- Sulphur Springs
- Tenmile
- Tiller
- Tyee
- Umpqua
- Union Gap
- Wilbur
- Winchester

=== Former communities ===
- Toketee
- Parksdale

== Transportation ==
=== Roads ===
Oregon Route 99 runs through Azalea, Tri-City, Myrtle Creek, Canyonville, Green, Roseburg, Winchester, Sutherlin, Rice Hill, Drain, and Anlauf.

Interstate 5 provides access to the communities of Tri-City, Myrtle Creek, Canyonville, Green, Roseburg, Sutherlin, and Rice Hill. Oregon Route 138 runs northwest from Roseburg to Elkton, Oregon, and generally east from Roseburg to its terminus at a junction with U.S. Route 97, just east of Diamond Lake and Crater Lake.

=== Buses ===
The communities of Douglas county are regionally served by U-Trans (formerly Umpqua Transit), the local bus service. In 2017, these services were significantly expanded to include locations such as Oakland, Oregon and Tenmile

Greyhound Lines provide the community of Roseburg with more distant transportation.

=== Airports ===
There are two public airports in Roseburg, Roseburg Regional Airport, a.k.a. Marion E. Carl Memorial Field at the north end of town and George Felt Airport (5S1) to the west.

== Politics ==
In contrast to the Willamette Valley, Douglas County is conservative and Republican, being akin to Josephine County to the south, or to Eastern Oregon. No Democratic presidential nominee has carried Douglas County since Lyndon B. Johnson's landslide win in 1964: indeed the last Democrat to crack forty percent of the county's vote was Michael Dukakis in 1988 during an election influenced by a major drought. Historically, the county, like all of Western Oregon north of the Rogue Valley, also leaned strongly Republican: before 1964 the only other Democrats to carry Douglas County had been John F. Kennedy in 1960, Franklin D. Roosevelt in 1936 and 1932, Woodrow Wilson in 1912 and William Jennings Bryan in 1896.

Douglas County is split between the highly conservative 2nd congressional district, represented by Cliff Bentz, and the liberal-leaning 4th district, which includes the Democratic stronghold of Eugene and has been represented by Democrat Val Hoyle since 2023. Within the Oregon House of Representatives, Douglas County is split between four districts. The coastal part, including Reedsport, lies within the 9th District represented by Republican Boomer Wright. A belt from Roseburg south lies in the 4th District, which extends into Jackson and Josephine counties, is represented by Republican Christine Goodwin. The far southwest adjacent to Curry and Coos counties is within the 1st District represented by Republican Court Boice, and the bulk of the county, centered on the northeastern half, lies in the 2nd District represented by Republican Virgle Osborne.

In the Oregon State Senate, Douglas County is split between three districts. The coastal part (9th House of Representatives District) lies within the 5th Senate District represented by Republican Dick Anderson. The two southwestern State House Districts (1st and 2nd) are part of the 1st Senate District represented by Republican David Brock Smith. The southernmost portion of Douglas County exists within the state's 2nd Senate District, represented by Republican Noah Robinson.

In spite of its conservative reputation, Douglas County voters have rejected two secessionist proposals to join the Greater Idaho coalition. An initial effort in November of 2020 failed on a vote of 56.68% in opposition to 43.32% in support. A second effort in May of 2022 was also rejected on a vote of 52.63% in opposition to 47.37% in support. This came despite the county, in 2020, giving 67.29% of its votes to Donald Trump and 29.78% of its votes to Joe Biden.

United States presidential election results for Douglas County, Oregon
Year	Republican		Democratic		Third party(ies)	
Year	No.	%	No.	%	No.	%
1880	1,256	52.80%	1,105	46.45%	18	0.76%
1884	1,216	51.20%	1,125	47.37%	34	1.43%
1888	1,305	51.72%	1,117	44.27%	101	4.00%
1892	1,329	44.27%	529	17.62%	1,144	38.11%
1896	1,917	47.66%	2,059	51.19%	46	1.14%
1900	1,910	51.94%	1,624	44.17%	143	3.89%
1904	2,443	63.21%	908	23.49%	514	13.30%
1908	2,092	53.81%	1,359	34.95%	437	11.24%
1912	1,267	26.04%	1,601	32.90%	1,998	41.06%
1916	3,922	48.16%	3,679	45.18%	542	6.66%
1920	4,402	60.18%	2,428	33.19%	485	6.63%
1924	4,219	53.75%	1,666	21.23%	1,964	25.02%
1928	5,609	70.52%	2,191	27.55%	154	1.94%
1932	4,046	44.69%	4,638	51.23%	370	4.09%
1936	4,254	42.08%	4,893	48.40%	963	9.53%
1940	5,991	55.63%	4,707	43.70%	72	0.67%
1944	6,134	56.59%	4,563	42.09%	143	1.32%
1948	7,671	56.35%	5,500	40.41%	441	3.24%
1952	14,109	64.11%	7,837	35.61%	63	0.29%
1956	13,837	53.92%	11,825	46.08%	0	0.00%
1960	12,493	48.39%	13,322	51.61%	0	0.00%
1964	9,806	38.13%	15,909	61.86%	2	0.01%
1968	13,410	51.40%	9,186	35.21%	3,496	13.40%
1972	15,881	57.73%	9,009	32.75%	2,618	9.52%
1976	16,500	50.04%	14,965	45.39%	1,508	4.57%
1980	23,101	58.46%	12,564	31.79%	3,851	9.75%
1984	25,243	63.11%	14,609	36.53%	144	0.36%
1988	20,120	52.38%	17,255	44.92%	1,040	2.71%
1992	19,011	41.45%	14,137	30.83%	12,712	27.72%
1996	21,855	51.10%	15,250	35.66%	5,664	13.24%
2000	30,294	64.16%	14,193	30.06%	2,733	5.79%
2004	35,956	65.39%	18,089	32.90%	939	1.71%
2008	30,919	58.41%	20,298	38.34%	1,720	3.25%
2012	30,776	61.80%	17,145	34.43%	1,882	3.78%
2016	34,582	64.61%	14,096	26.34%	4,843	9.05%
2020	43,298	67.29%	19,160	29.78%	1,891	2.94%
2024	41,561	67.24%	18,386	29.75%	1,860	3.01%

== Economy ==
Almost the entire watershed of the Umpqua River lies within the boundaries of Douglas County. The heavily timbered county contains nearly 1.8 million acres (7,300 km^{2}) of commercial forest lands and one of the oldest stands of old growth timber in the world. Approximately 25–30% of the labor force is employed in the forest products industry. Agriculture, mainly field crops, orchards, and livestock (particularly sheep ranching), is also important to the economy of the county. The land of Douglas County is roughly half-publicly and half-privately owned.

The post-Prohibition wine industry in Oregon began with Richard Sommer planting HillCrest Vineyard at the south end of the Umpqua Valley in 1961. The Umpqua Valley wine appellation lies entirely within Douglas county.

Nickel has been refined at Riddle since 1954. There is a significant federal presence in the region; the Forest Service and Bureau of Land Management administer more than 50% of the county's land.

As of 2015, the top ten private employers in the county were as follows:

#	Employer	# of Employees
1	Roseburg Forest Products	1,885
2	Mercy Medical Center	1,092
3	Swanson Group Aviation	682
4	TMS Call Center	615
5	Seven Feathers Casino Resort	606
6	First Call Resolution	424
7	Umpqua Bank	331
8	Orenco Systems	266
9	A&M Transport, Inc.	200
10	Douglas County Forest Products	160

== Education ==
School districts include:

- Camas Valley School District 21J
- Days Creek School District 15
- Elkton School District 34
- Fern Ridge School District 28J
- Glendale School District 77
- Glide School District 12
- North Douglas School District 22
- Oakland School District 1
- Reedsport School District 105
- Riddle School District 70
- Roseburg School District 4
- Siuslaw School District 97J
- South Lane School District 45J
- South Umpqua School District 19
- Sutherlin School District 130
- Winston-Dillard School District 116
- Yoncalla School District 32

The community college of most of the county is Umpqua Community College. A portion facing the coast is assigned to Southwestern Oregon Community College.

== Newspapers ==
- Douglas County News (2001-2015)
- The Drain Enterprise (1922-2015)
- The News-Review (1887-Present)
- The Umpqua Post (1996-2020)

== See also ==
- National Register of Historic Places listings in Douglas County, Oregon
