= Roseburg North, Oregon =

- CDP
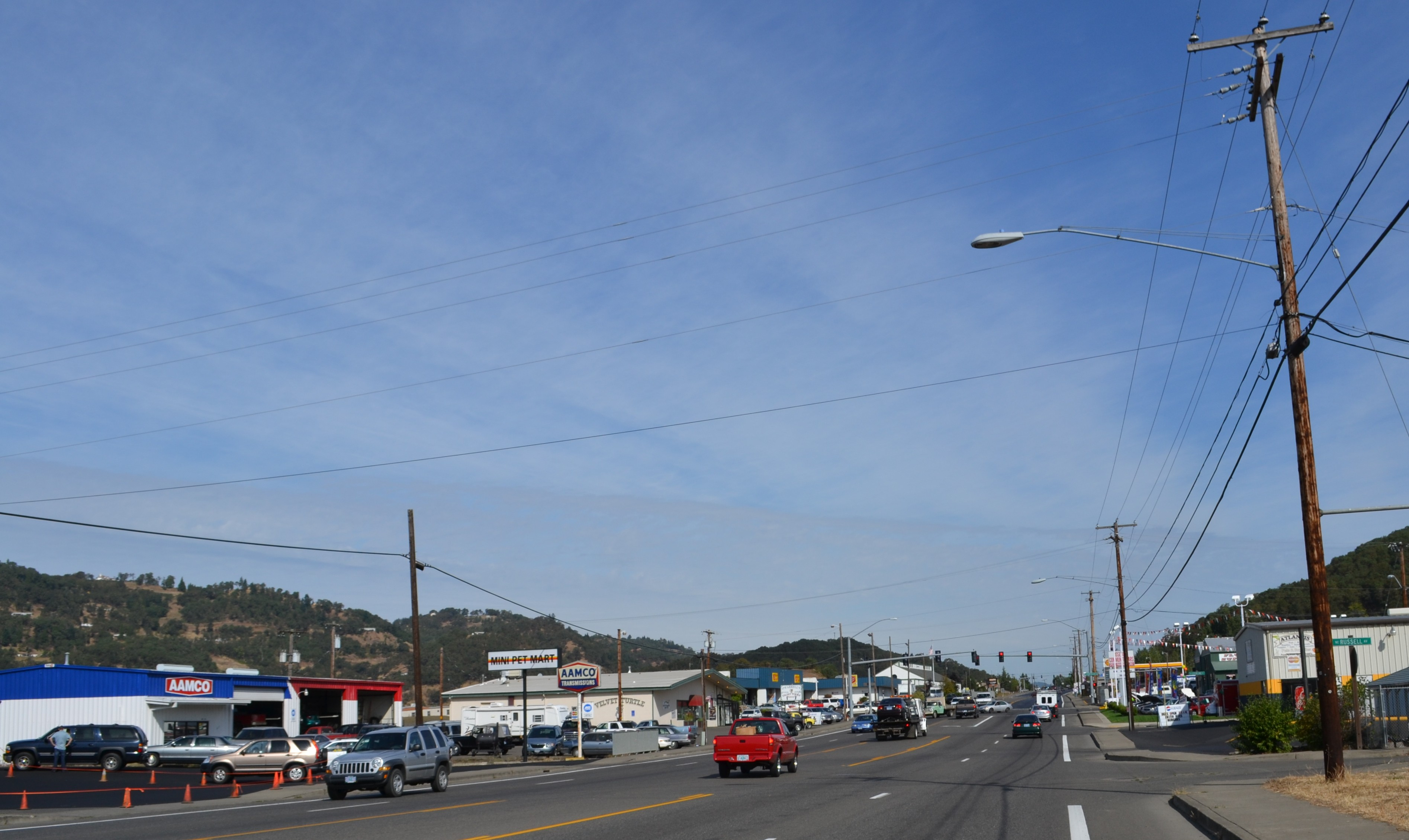

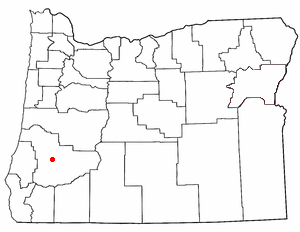
- Location of Roseburg North, Oregon
- Coordinates: 43°15′32″N 123°20′41″W
- Country: United States
- State: Oregon
- County: Douglas

Area
  - Total: 1.86 sq mi (4.83 km^{2})
  - Land: 1.81 sq mi (4.70 km^{2})
  - Water: 0.050 sq mi (0.13 km^{2})
- Elevation: 600 ft (180 m)

Population (2020)
  - Total: 4,375
  - Density: 2,411.4/sq mi (931.05/km^{2})
- Time zone: UTC-8 (Pacific (PST))
  - Summer (DST): UTC-7 (PDT)
- FIPS code: 41-63660
- GNIS feature ID: 2409210

Roseburg North is a census-designated place (CDP) in Douglas County, Oregon, United States. As of the 2020 census, Roseburg North had a population of 4,375. Winchester, Oregon is included as part of Roseburg North.

== Geography ==
According to the United States Census Bureau, the CDP has a total area of 22.7 square miles (58.8 km^{2}), of which 22.3 square miles (57.8 km^{2}) is land and 0.39 square miles (1.0 km^{2}), or 1.63%, is water. The CDP includes land north of Roseburg city limits, but south of Umpqua Community College, including the settlement of Winchester.

== Demographics ==
Historical population
| Census | Pop. | Note | %± |
|---|---|---|---|
| 2020 | 4,375 | | — |
U.S. Decennial Census

=== 2020 census ===
As of the 2020 census, Roseburg North had a population of 4,375. The median age was 48.9 years. 17.6% of residents were under the age of 18 and 27.8% of residents were 65 years of age or older. For every 100 females there were 94.6 males, and for every 100 females age 18 and over there were 90.3 males age 18 and over.

99.5% of residents lived in urban areas, while 0.5% lived in rural areas.

There were 1,924 households in Roseburg North, of which 20.0% had children under the age of 18 living in them. Of all households, 44.0% were married-couple households, 19.0% were households with a male householder and no spouse or partner present, and 28.8% were households with a female householder and no spouse or partner present. About 30.9% of all households were made up of individuals and 18.4% had someone living alone who was 65 years of age or older.

There were 2,025 housing units, of which 5.0% were vacant. The homeowner vacancy rate was 1.4% and the rental vacancy rate was 5.3%.

Racial composition as of the 2020 census
| Race | Number | Percent |
|---|---|---|
| White | 3,771 | 86.2% |
| Black or African American | 16 | 0.4% |
| American Indian and Alaska Native | 80 | 1.8% |
| Asian | 89 | 2.0% |
| Native Hawaiian and Other Pacific Islander | 10 | 0.2% |
| Some other race | 65 | 1.5% |
| Two or more races | 344 | 7.9% |
| Hispanic or Latino (of any race) | 276 | 6.3% |

=== 2000 census ===
As of the census of 2000, there were 5,473 people, 2,341 households, and 1,556 families residing in the CDP. The population density was 240.4 inhabitants per square mile (92.8/km^{2}). There were 2,491 housing units at an average density of 109.4 per square mile (42.2/km^{2}). The racial makeup of the CDP was 93.97% White, 0.18% African American, 1.06% Native American, 0.75% Asian, 0.02% Pacific Islander, 1.21% from other races, and 2.81% from two or more races. Hispanic or Latino of any race were 3.07% of the population.

There were 2,341 households, out of which 25.3% had children under the age of 18 living with them, 54.1% were married couples living together, 9.0% had a female householder with no husband present, and 33.5% were non-families. 28.2% of all households were made up of individuals, and 14.4% had someone living alone who was 65 years of age or older. The average household size was 2.31 and the average family size was 2.79.

In the CDP, the population was spread out, with 21.1% under the age of 18, 7.9% from 18 to 24, 23.8% from 25 to 44, 26.7% from 45 to 64, and 20.4% who were 65 years of age or older. The median age was 43 years. For every 100 females, there were 93.5 males. For every 100 females age 18 and over, there were 90.9 males.

The median income for a household in the CDP was $35,684, and the median income for a family was $43,013. Males had a median income of $35,370 versus $21,953 for females. The per capita income for the CDP was $17,705. About 6.2% of families and 9.1% of the population were below the poverty line, including 8.7% of those under age 18 and 11.6% of those age 65 or over.
