= Roseburg Regional Airport =

Airport in Oregon, US

Roseburg Regional Airport Marion E. Carl Memorial Field
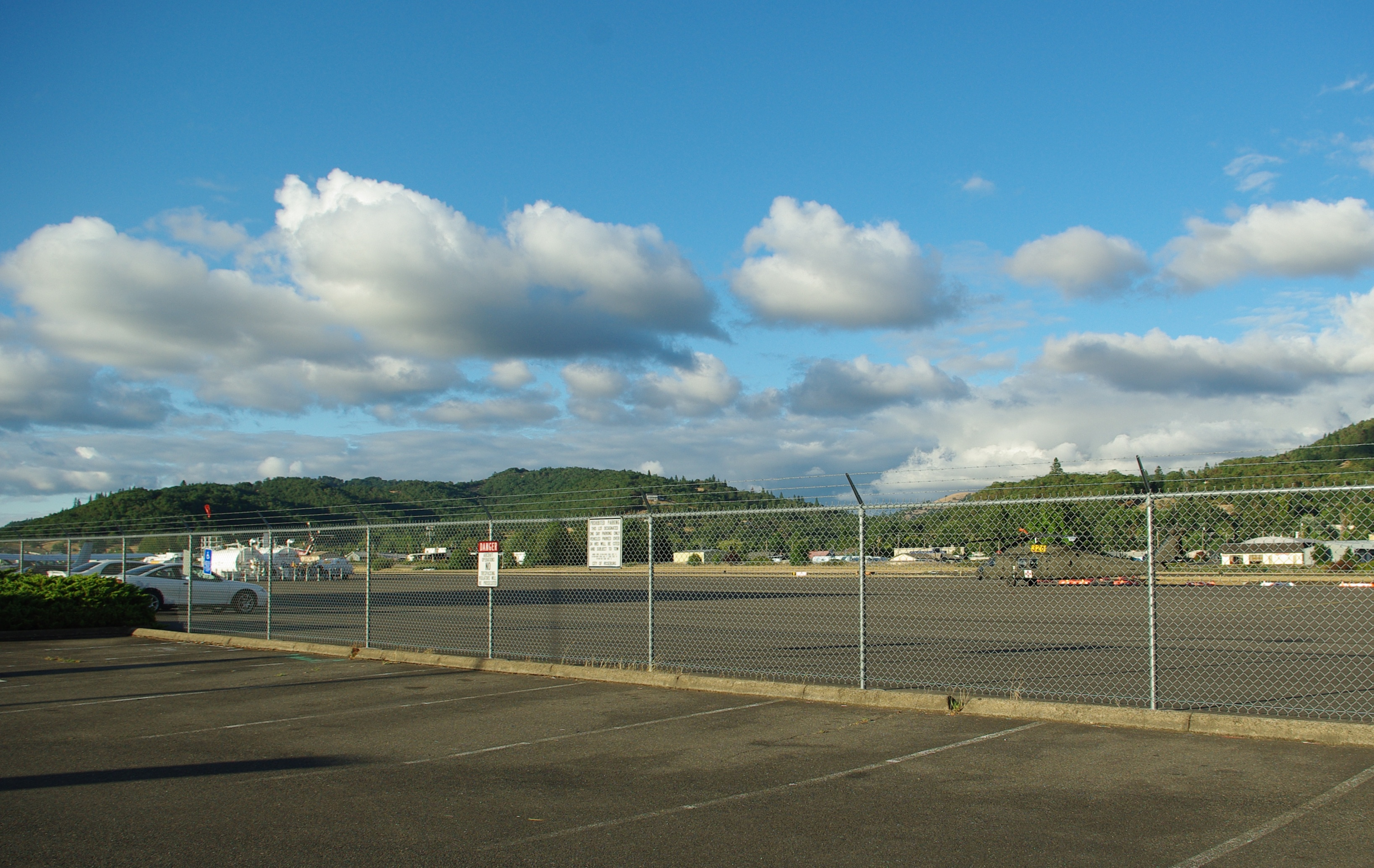
- IATA: RBG; ICAO: KRBG; FAA LID: RBG

Summary
- Airport type: Public
- Owner: City of Roseburg
- Serves: Roseburg, Oregon
- Elevation AMSL: 533 ft / 163 m
- Coordinates: 43°14′20″N 123°21′21″W
- Interactive map of Roseburg Regional Airport

Runways
Direction	Length		Surface
Direction	ft	m	Surface
16/34	5,003	1,525	Asphalt

Statistics (2019)
- Aircraft operations: 31,750
- Based aircraft: 76
- Sources: Airport website and FAA

Roseburg Regional Airport (IATA: RBG, ICAO: KRBG, FAA LID: RBG) is in Douglas County, Oregon, United States, a mile northwest of Roseburg, which owns it. As of 1998 it is also known as Major General Marion E. Carl Memorial Field, named after Marion Eugene Carl (1915–1998).

== History ==
1928: The original land acquisition for the establishment of the "Roseburg Aviation Park" occurred in 1928, with additional property purchased in 1929. This brought the airport and aviation park area to about 100 acres, with additional property made available for industrial development. Funding for the initial purchase was achieved through a successful bond initiative, spearheaded by the Umpqua Post of the American Legion. The bond measure provided $25,000. Twelve thousand of this sum purchased the properties and thirteen thousand was used for hangar construction, drainage improvements, and the initial runway construction. The initial runway was approximately 3,800 feet in length. A portion of the original property was later sold to the State to construct Interstate 5 and a portion west of the future freeway was sold to an individual for future development. These funds were utilized for airport purposes.

1931-August 23: Earl Branson owned the Roseburg Flying Service. On Sunday, August 24, 1931, an advertisement appeared in the local newspaper (name unknown). He advertised "FLY $1.00, Licensed Pilots--Licensed Planes. You are invited to inspect the Roseburg Municipal airport and the equipment of the Roseburg Flying Service. You are welcome at any time but particularly on Sunday, August 24. The Roseburg Flying Service, owned and operated by Earl Branson, is here to furnish taxi service, flying instruction, and general air service. We want the people of Roseburg to realize that flying has its place in transportation and in the recreational life of the community."

1931-September 31: Max Powers, age 14, signed "Agreement" with the Roseburg Flying School for a "ground course" in exchange for working for the Roseburg Flying Service.

1931-December 1: Keith Smith, 16-year-old aviation student crashed his airplane at the Roseburg airport and died. He had been a partner in the Roseburg Flying Service with Earl Branson.

1932-January 4: Earl Branson, age 26, Roseburg flier, assistant superintendent at the Roseburg Airport and co-owner of the Roseburg Flying Service died, at Mercy Hospital, from a ruptured appendix.

1932-after January 4: Max Powers reports that the Roseburg City Manager appeared at his house at Rt.2 Box 3603, Roseburg, with a partnership agreement indicating that Max was the third partner in the Roseburg Flying Service. After the death of Keith Smith and Earl Branson, Max Powers was the sole owner. Max's father, George, rejected ownership and requested that it be turned over to the widow of Earl Branson.

1951: Airline flights (West Coast DC-3s) started in 1951–52; successor Hughes Airwest left in 1973.

1953: Passenger carrying peaks at just over 5,100 boardings.

1965: Passenger carrying drops to a low of just 344 boardings. While service during this period was continuous, the frequency and reliability varied, thus affecting passenger boardings. Shortly thereafter, regular service changed to scheduled air taxi service.

1978: The Airline Deregulation Act is signed into law, deprioritizing passenger service from Roseburg.

1984: Roseburg is no longer a candidate for third level passenger service. Class III passenger classification allows for the lowest level (10-30 seats) of scheduled air carrier aircraft operations.

1992: The airport is renamed from "Roseburg Aviation Park" to Roseburg Regional Airport.

2012: Runway 16/34 is extended 400 feet with funding from the State of Oregon through the Connect Oregon grant program. The FAA did not support this extension. Because of this, when Taxiway A was relocated in 2013, the FAA did not fund the final 400 feet of Taxiway A.

Air Oregon flew nonstop from Roseburg to Mahlon Sweet Field in Eugene, Oregon and on to Portland International Airport.

== Facilities ==
The airport covers 200 acres (81 ha) at an elevation of 533 feet (163 m). Its one runway, 16/34, is 5,003 by 100 feet (1,525 x 30 m) asphalt.

In the twelve months ending November 20, 2019, the airport had 31,750 aircraft operations, average 86 per day: 92% general aviation, 8% air taxi, and <1% military. 76 aircraft were then based at the airport: 80% single-engine, 7% multi-engine, 9% jet and 4% helicopter.

== Airlines and destinations ==
=== Cargo ===
Airlines	Destinations
Ameriflight	Eugene, Medford
FedEx Feeder	Eugene, Medford, North Bend/Coos Bay, Portland (OR)
