= Leona, Oregon =

Unincorporated community in the state of Oregon, United States

- Unincorporated community
- Location within Oregon Location within the United States
- Coordinates: 43°41′42″N 123°17′21″W
- Country: United States
- State: Oregon
- County: Douglas
- Elevation: 322 ft (98 m)
- Time zone: UTC-8 (Pacific (PST))
  - Summer (DST): UTC-7 (PDT)
- ZIP code: 97435
- Area codes: 458 and 541
- GNIS feature ID: 1166672

Leona, formerly known as Hudson, is an unincorporated community in Douglas County, Oregon, United States. It was named for Leona Perkins. Its post office was established on February 14, 1901 and Thomas E. Bledsoe was its first postmaster.

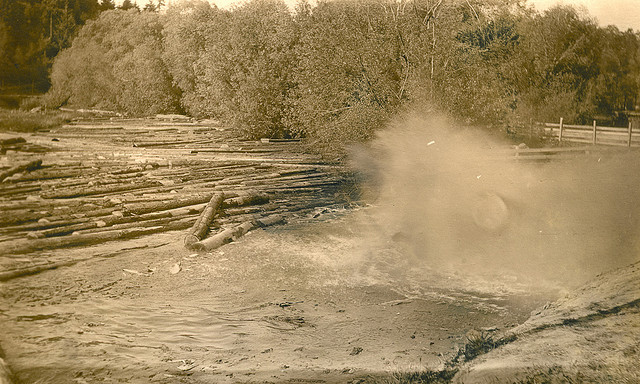
The log pond at Leona
