= Union Gap, Oregon =

Census-designated place in the state of Oregon, United States

- Census-designated place
- Location within Oregon Location within the United States
- Coordinates: 43°24′11″N 123°18′50″W
- Country: United States
- State: Oregon
- County: Douglas
- Elevation: 577 ft (176 m)
- Time zone: UTC-8 (Pacific (PST))
  - Summer (DST): UTC-7 (PDT)
- ZIP code: 97462
- Area codes: 458 and 541
- GNIS feature ID: 2611782

Union Gap is an unincorporated community and Census-designated place located in Douglas County, Oregon.
