= Tyee Sandstone =

Geologic formation in Oregon, U.S.

- Type: Formation

Location
- Region: Oregon
- Country: United States

The Tyee Sandstone is a geologic formation in Oregon. It preserves fossils.

== See also ==
- List of fossiliferous stratigraphic units in Oregon
- Paleontology in Oregon
