= Roseburg School District =

School district in Oregon, USA

Roseburg School District (4) is a public school district in the U.S. state of Oregon that serves the communities of Roseburg and Winchester. The district enrolls close to 7,000 students.

== Schools ==
=== Elementary schools ===
- Eastwood Elementary
- Fir Grove Elementary
- Fullerton IV Elementary
- Green Elementary
- Hucrest Elementary
- Melrose Elementary
- Sunnyslope Elementary
- Winchester Elementary

=== Middle schools ===
- John C. Frémont Middle School
- Joseph Lane Middle School

=== High school ===
- Roseburg High School
