= Dillard, Oregon =

Unincorporated community in the state of Oregon, United States

- Census-designated place (CDP)
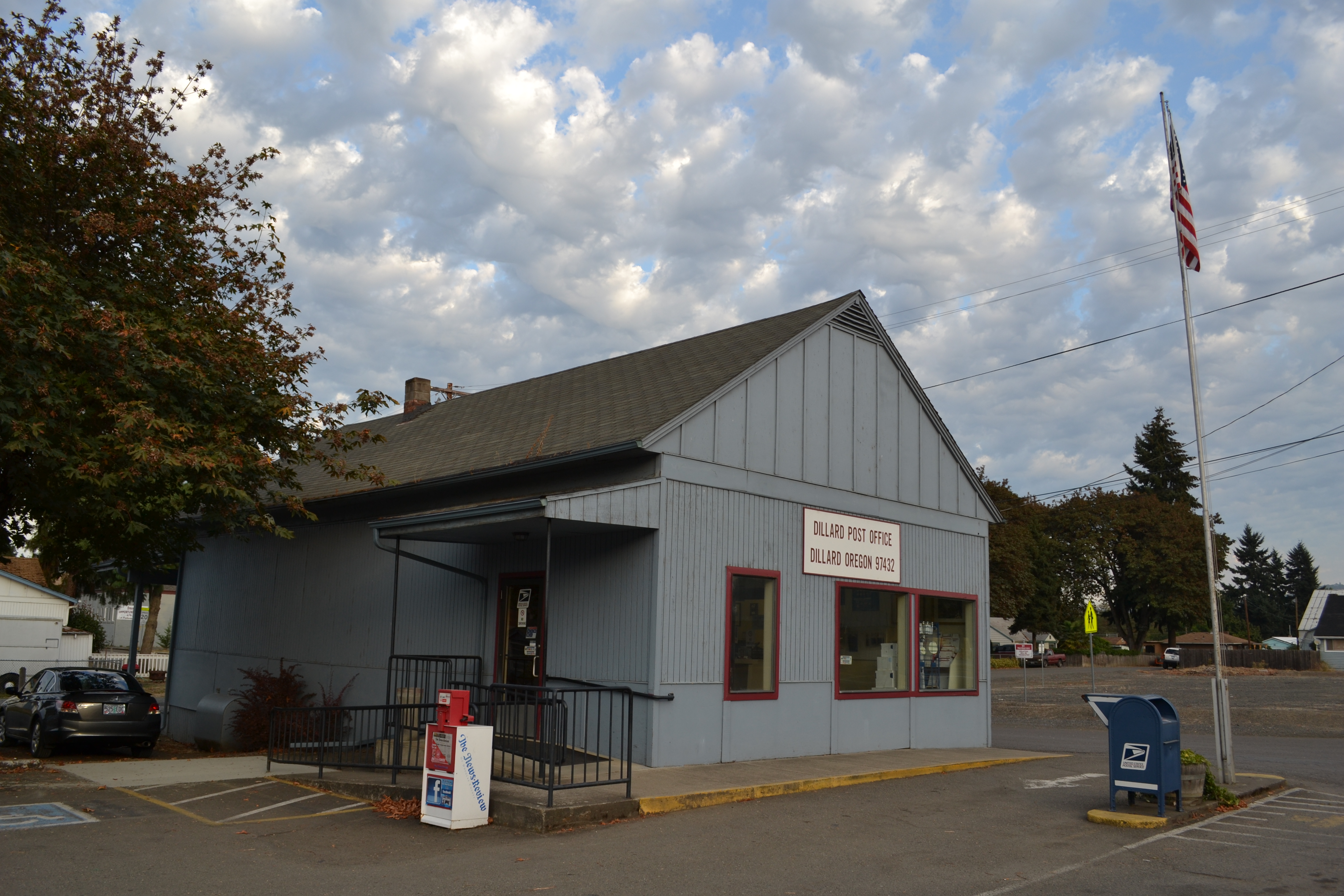
- Dillard Post Office

- Location within Oregon Location within the United States
- Coordinates: 43°06′30″N 123°25′34″W
- Country: United States
- State: Oregon
- County: Douglas

Area
  - Total: 1.18 sq mi (3.05 km^{2})
  - Land: 1.18 sq mi (3.05 km^{2})
  - Water: 0 sq mi (0.00 km^{2})
- Elevation: 515 ft (157 m)

Population (2020)
  - Total: 385
  - Density: 326.7/sq mi (126.13/km^{2})
- Time zone: UTC-8 (Pacific (PST))
  - Summer (DST): UTC-7 (PDT)
- ZIP code: 97432
- Area codes: 458/541
- GNIS feature ID: 2611728

Dillard is an unincorporated community and census-designated place in Douglas County, Oregon, United States. Dillard is south of the city of Winston. Dillard has a post office with ZIP code 97432. As of the 2020 census, Dillard had a population of 385.

== Demographics ==
Historical population
Census	Pop.	Note	%±
2020	385		—
U.S. Decennial Census

== Climate ==
This region experiences warm (but not hot) and dry summers, with no average monthly temperatures above 71.6 °F. According to the Köppen Climate Classification system, Dillard has a warm-summer Mediterranean climate, abbreviated "Csb" on climate maps.
