= Green, Oregon =

Unincorporated community in the state of Oregon, United States

- Census-designated place (CDP)
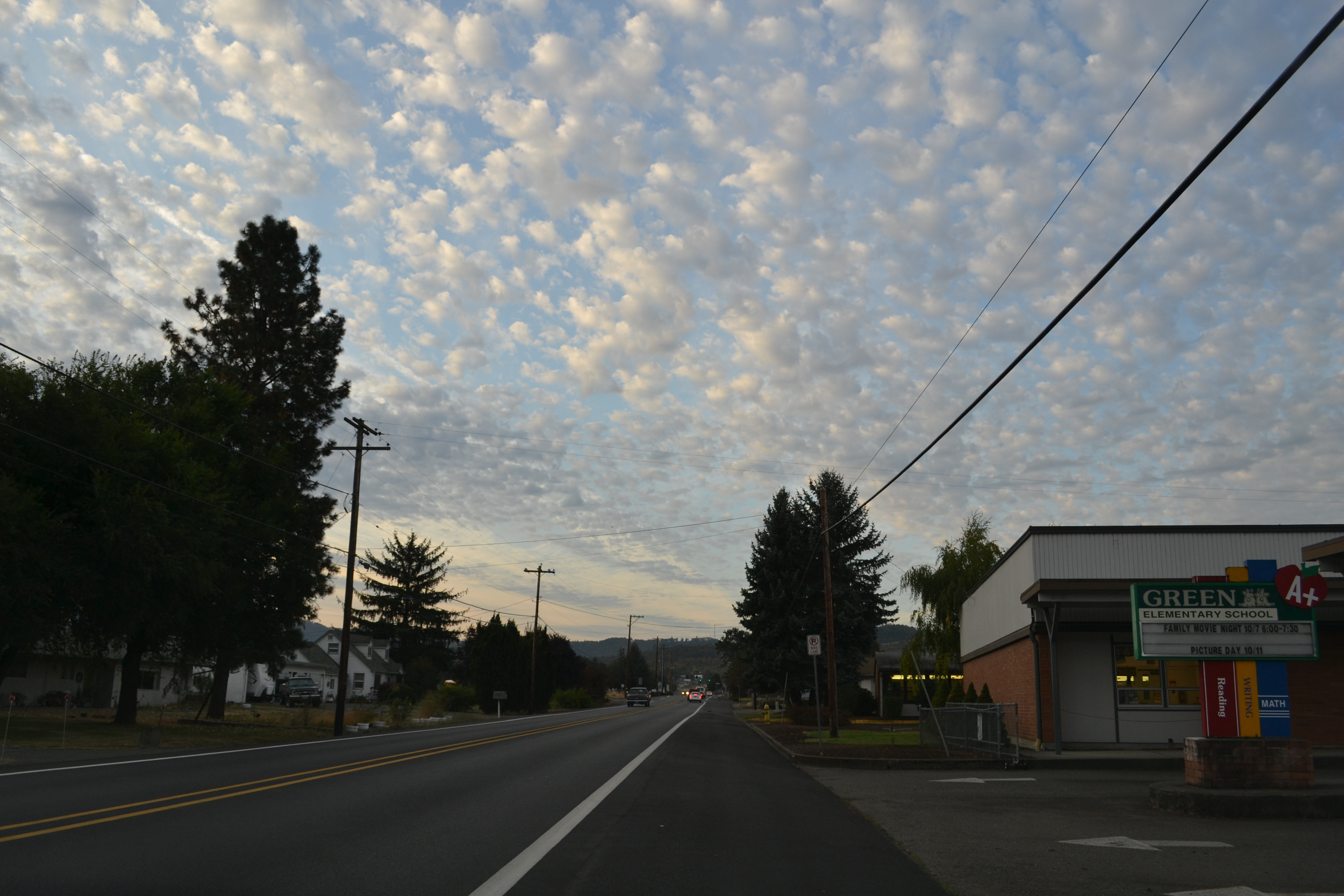
- Street scene in the community

- Location of Green, Oregon
- Coordinates: 43°08′58″N 123°22′45″W
- Country: United States
- State: Oregon
- County: Douglas

Area
  - Total: 4.70 sq mi (12.16 km^{2})
  - Land: 4.56 sq mi (11.80 km^{2})
  - Water: 0.14 sq mi (0.36 km^{2})
- Elevation: 522 ft (159 m)

Population (2020)
  - Total: 7,614
  - Density: 1,671.5/sq mi (645.38/km^{2})
- Time zone: UTC-8 (Pacific (PST))
  - Summer (DST): UTC-7 (PDT)
- FIPS code: 41-30750
- GNIS feature ID: 2408328

Green is a census-designated place (CDP) and unincorporated community in Douglas County, Oregon, United States. The population was 7,614 at the 2020 census.

== Education ==
Green has two public elementary schools, Green Elementary and Sunnyslope Elementary.

As of 2020, 89.3% of the adult population, aged 25 and above, were high school graduates, and 15.1% had a bachelor's degree.

== Geography ==
According to the United States Census Bureau, the CDP has a total area of 4.7 square miles (12 km^{2}), of which 4.6 square miles (12 km^{2}) is land and 0.2 square miles (0.52 km^{2}), or 3.61%, is water.

== Demographics ==
Prior to 1970, the United States census did not include specific population data for Green CDP. Until 1980, Green was included in the "Looking Glass division."

Historical population
Census	Pop.	Note	%±
1970	1,612		—
1980	3,897		141.7%
1990	5,076		30.3%
2000	6,174		21.6%
2010	7,515		21.7%
2020	7,614		1.3%
U.S. Decennial Census

=== 2020 ===
In 2020, Green had 3,106 households, with an average of 2.61 persons per household. 83.3% had been living in the same home one year ago. The median household income was $57,737, and the per capita income $25,109. 13.3% of the population were below the poverty line.

19.3% of the population were aged 17 or under, and 16.9% were over the age of 65. Females were 49.5% of the population. 9.89% of the adult population were veterans.

6.2% of people spoke a language other than English at home, and 3.3% were foreign born. The racial distribution of the CDP was 93.8% white (88.3% Non-Hispanic white), 0.4% African American, 0.6% Native American, 0.2% Asian, and 0% Hawaiian or Pacific Islander. 3.4% identified as two or more races, and 7.7% as Hispanic or Latino.

=== 2000 ===
As of the census of 2000, there were 6,174 people, 2,197 households, and 1,718 families residing in the CDP. The population density was 1,358.1 inhabitants per square mile (524.4/km^{2}). There were 2,350 housing units at an average density of 516.9 per square mile (199.6/km^{2}). The racial makeup of the CDP was 93.94% White, 0.16% African American, 1.20% Native American, 0.50% Asian, 0.13% Pacific Islander, 1.57% from other races, and 2.49% from two or more races. Hispanic or Latino people of any race were 4.41% of the population.

There were 2,197 households, out of which 39.5% had children under the age of 18 living with them, 59.7% were married couples living together, 13.5% had a female householder with no husband present, and 21.8% were non-families. 17.9% of all households were made up of individuals, and 6.4% had someone living alone who was 65 years of age or older. The average household size was 2.79 and the average family size was 3.08.

In the CDP, the population was spread out, with 30.3% under the age of 18, 8.1% from 18 to 24, 30.2% from 25 to 44, 20.9% from 45 to 64, and 10.5% who were 65 years of age or older. The median age was 33 years. For every 100 females, there were 93.1 males. For every 100 females age 18 and over, there were 90.6 males.

The median income for a household in the CDP was $35,660, and the median income for a family was $40,400. Males had a median income of $31,582 versus $21,984 for females. The per capita income for the CDP was $15,208. About 10.2% of families and 12.0% of the population were below the poverty line, including 15.9% of those under age 18 and 12.9% of those age 65 or over.
