= Roseburg, Oregon =

Roseburg
- City
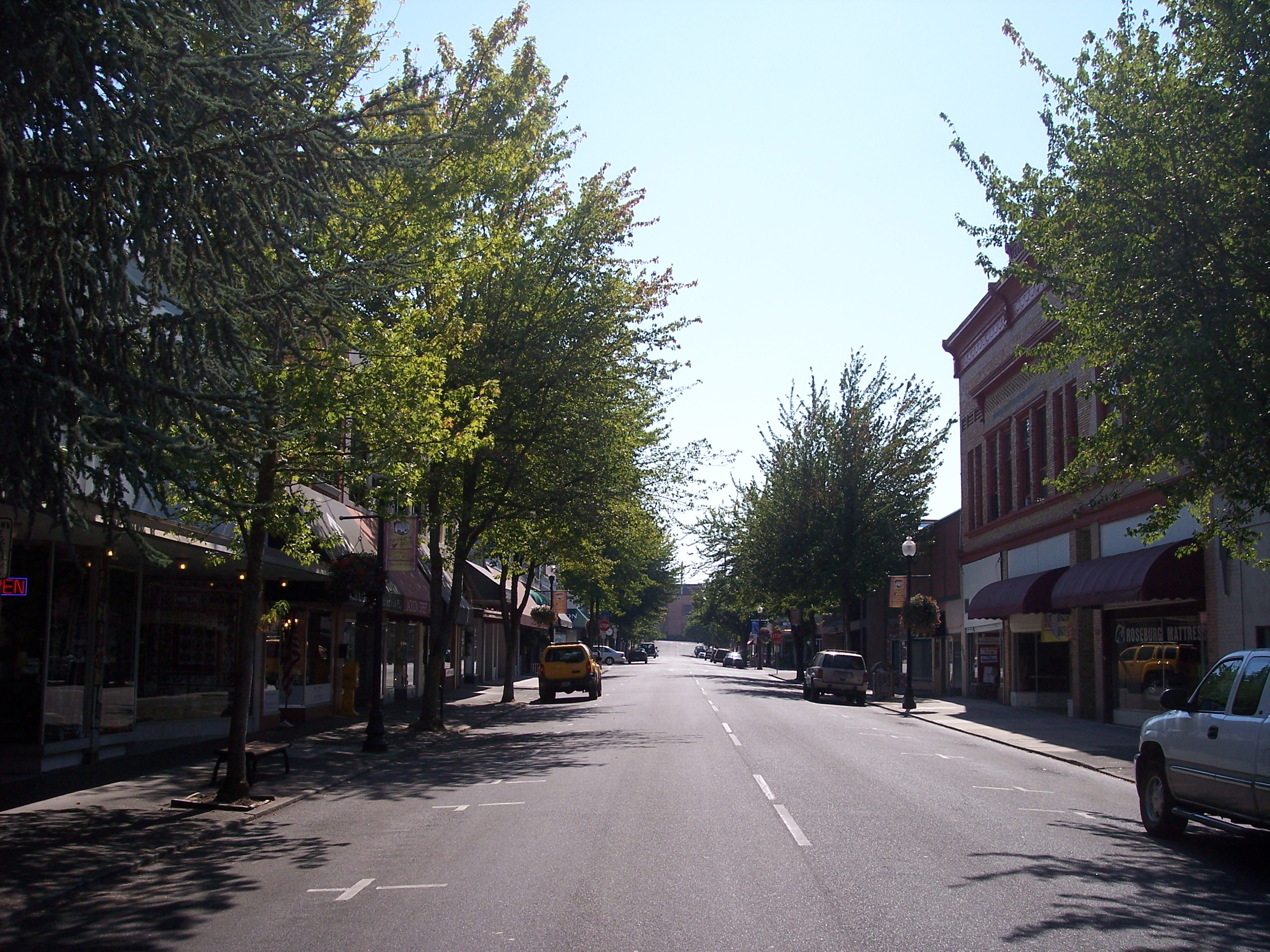
- Nickname: Timber capital of the World
- Location within Douglas County and Oregon
- Coordinates: 43°14′23″N 123°21′27″W
- Country: United States
- State: Oregon
- County: Douglas
- Incorporated: 1872

Area
  - Total: 10.91 sq mi (28.26 km^{2})
  - Land: 10.72 sq mi (27.77 km^{2})
  - Water: 0.19 sq mi (0.50 km^{2})
- Elevation: 479 ft (146 m)

Population (2020)
  - Total: 23,683
  - Density: 2,209.2/sq mi (852.96/km^{2})
- Time zone: UTC−8 (Pacific)
  - Summer (DST): UTC−7 (Pacific)
- ZIP codes: 97470, 97471
- Area code: 541
- FIPS code: 41-63650
- GNIS feature ID: 2410997
- Website: roseburgor.gov

Roseburg is the most populous city in and the county seat of Douglas County, Oregon. It is located in the Umpqua River Valley in southern Oregon. Founded in 1851, the population was 23,683 at the 2020 census, making it the principal city of the Roseburg, Oregon Micropolitan Statistical Area. The community developed along both sides of the South Umpqua River and is traversed by Interstate 5. Traditionally a lumber industry town, Roseburg is the home of Roseburg Forest Products, which now spans across five different states and two countries.

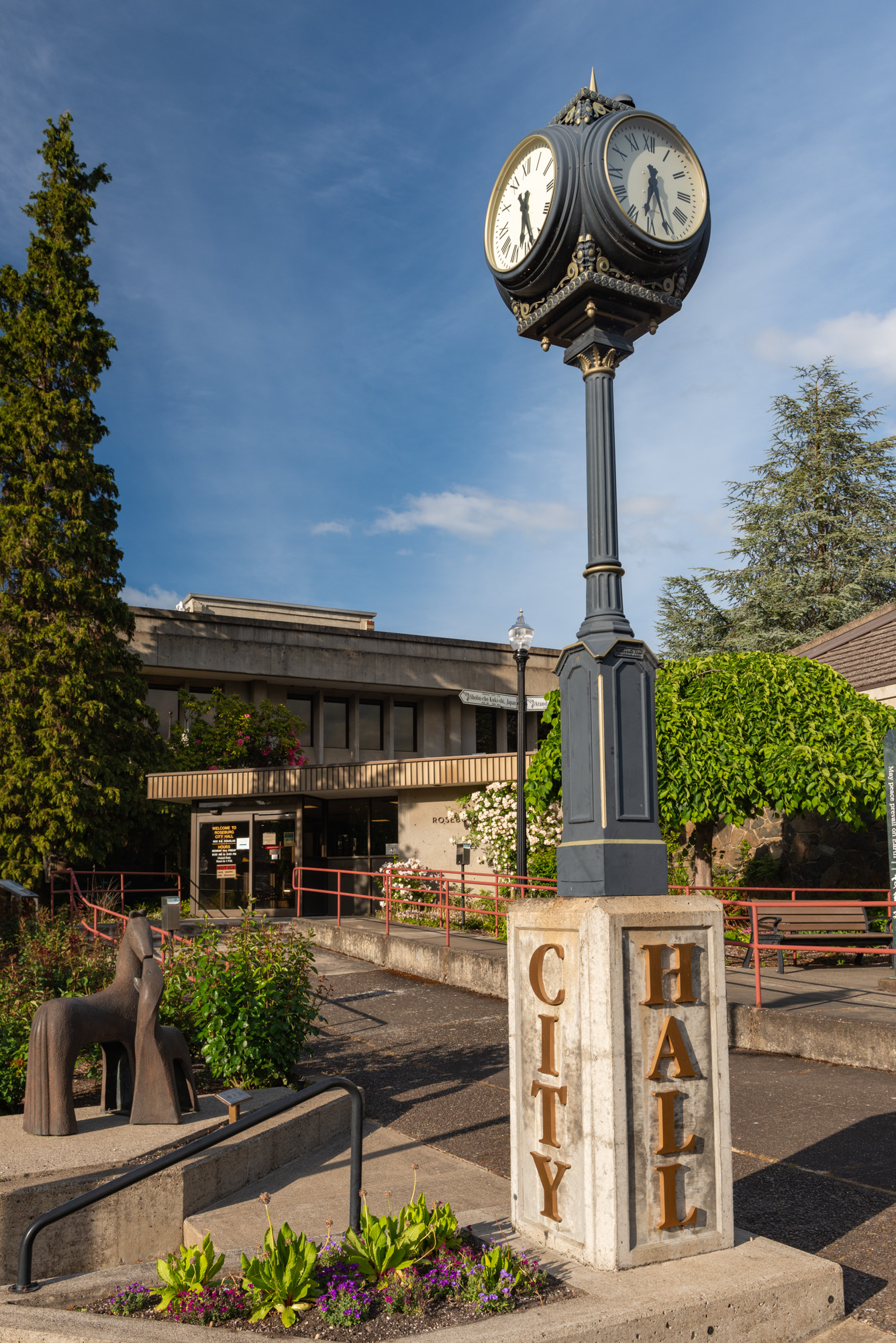
City Hall

== Natural resources ==
Waterfalls near Roseburg include Susan Creek Falls and Fall Creek Falls. Roseburg's primary industries include timber and tourism, and the region is home to many vineyards and more than 30 wineries.

The Oregon Department of Fish & Wildlife lists more than 50 areas for fishing for salmon, steelhead, bass, bluegill and trout in the Roseburg area.

== History ==
Modern-day Roseburg is located on the former lands of numerous Indian tribes, including the Cow Creek Band of the Umpqua Tribe, whose Cow Creek Umpqua Indian Foundation is located in Roseburg. Roseburg was the site of the 1855 Battle of Hungry Hill, part of the Rogue River Wars of 1855–56, fought between several southern Oregon Indian groups and the US Army.

The city was named for settler Aaron Rose, who established a homestead within the current city limits on September 23, 1851. Rose was born in 1813 in Ulster County, New York. In 1851, he came to Oregon from Coldwater, Michigan, where he had lived since 1837.

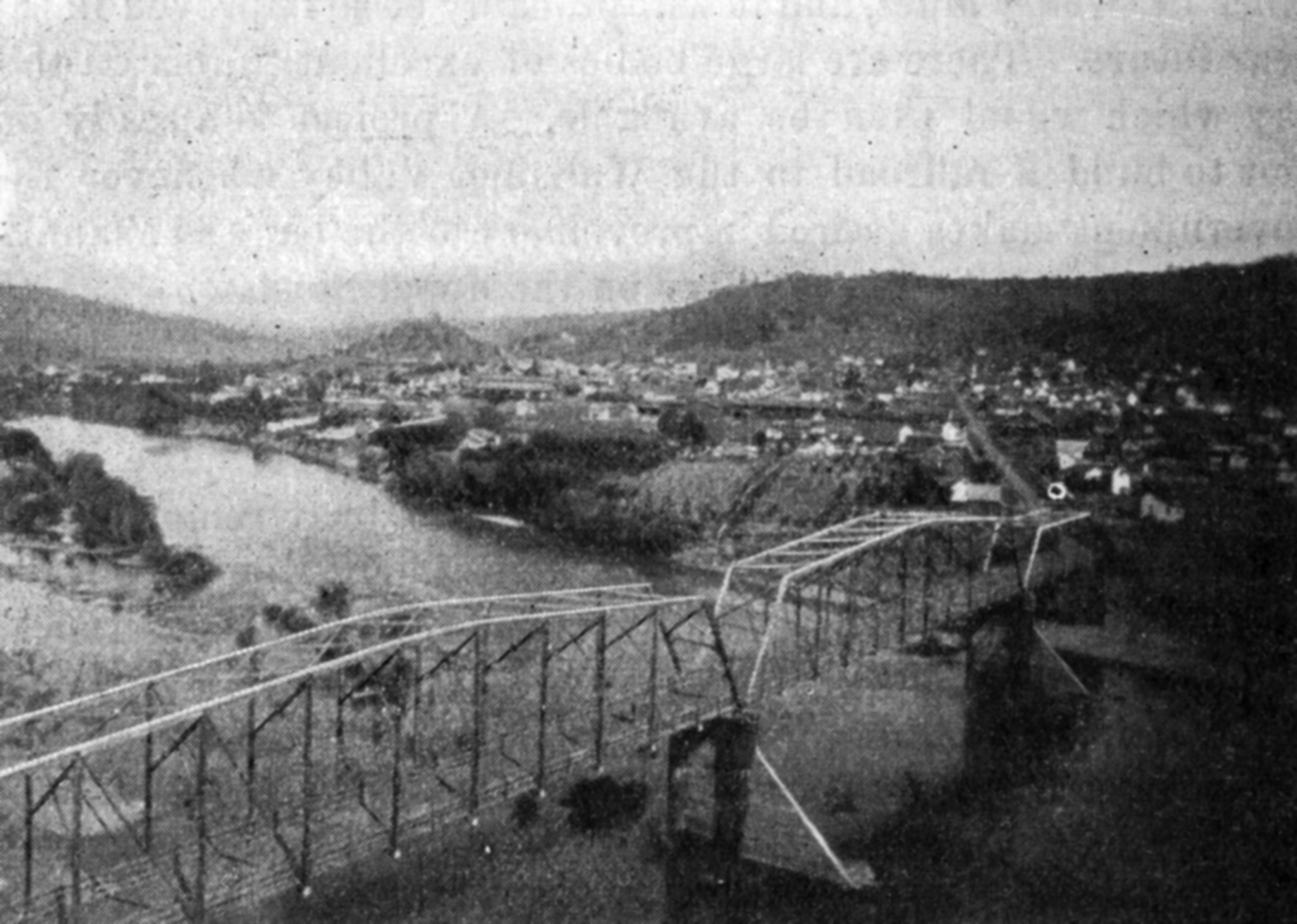
Roseburg in 1891

Rose constructed the first building in what would become Roseburg, a rough structure made of poles and clapboards with a front room about 16 or 18 feet square; it was used as a grocery store, backed by a dining room and kitchen. Originally, guests could use the floor of the front room to spread their beds or were able to sleep out of doors under nearby oak trees. His first structure served as a roadside inn and tavern for many years. Rose built a proper hotel in 1853. He died in 1899.

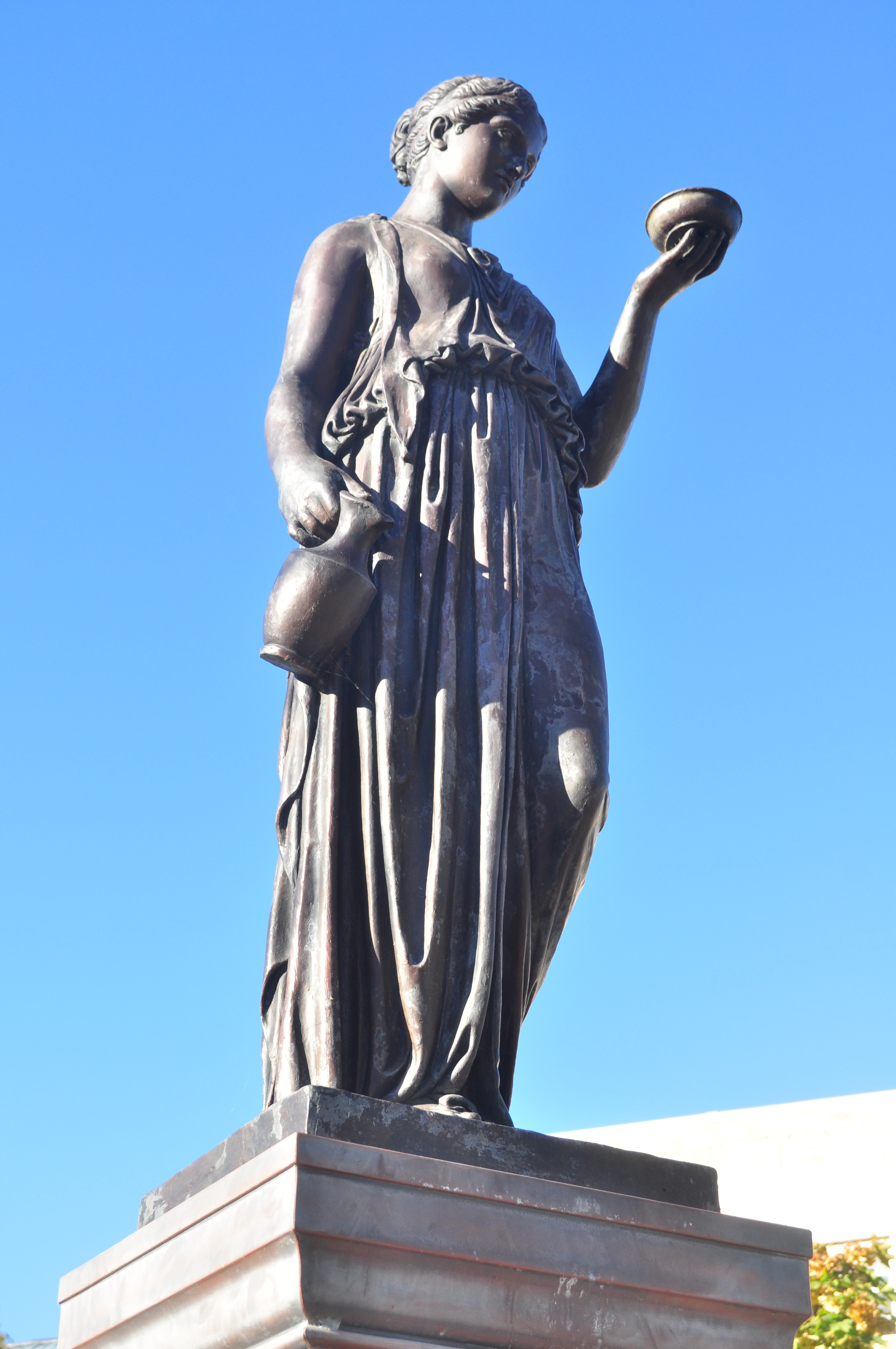
Hebe Fountain, reconstructed in 2002

Roseburg was first known as Deer Creek because it was at the confluence of Deer Creek and the South Umpqua River. In 1854, voters chose Roseburg as the county seat over rival town Winchester. Rose donated 3 acres (1.2 ha) of land and $1,000 for the building of the county courthouse, and the important buildings of Winchester were moved to Roseburg before 1860.

Deer Creek post office was established in 1852, and the name changed to "Roseburgh" in 1857. The spelling was changed to "Roseburg" in 1894. Roseburg was incorporated by the Oregon Legislative Assembly on October 3, 1872.

=== Timber Capital of the Nation ===
The fortunes of Roseburg grew with the lumber industry. In 1937, Roseburg Lumber opened. Founded by Kenneth Ford, the company became the major employer in the community. Other major employers, including Weyerhaeuser, Champion and Sun Studs also developed and grew during this time. By the 1970s Roseburg branded itself as the Timber Capital of the Nation.

Country singer Johnny Cash mythologized Roseburg loggers in the 1960 song "Lumberjack”:

"Ride this train to Roseburg, Oregon. Now there's a town for you! You talk about rough... You know a lot of places in the country claim Paul Bunyon lived there. But you should have seen Roseburg when me and my daddy come there. Every one of them loggers looked like Paul Bunyon to me.”

=== Roseburg Blast ===
On August 7, 1959, at approximately 1:00 a.m., the Gerretsen Building Supply Company caught fire. Firefighters soon arrived at the building, near Oak and Pine Streets, to extinguish the fire. Earlier in the evening, a truck driver for the Pacific Powder Company, George Rutherford, had parked his explosives truck in front of the building, which was not noticed. The truck exploded at around 1:14 a.m., destroying buildings in an eight-block radius and severely damaging 30 more blocks.

The truck was loaded with two tons of dynamite and four-and-a-half tons of the blasting agent nitrocarbonitrate. Rutherford had parked the truck after arranging his delivery for the following morning, despite warnings given to the Pacific Powder Company two days earlier not to leave such trucks unattended or park them in "congested areas". A police officer named Donald De Sues and the Chief of Police were on site and managed to evacuate citizens from the area of the truck before the explosion. Donald De Sues and the town Assistant Fire Chief, Roy McFarlane, were recognized as heroes that day and were both killed in the blast. A total of fourteen people died in the blast and fire, and 125 were injured. Damage was estimated at 10 to 12 million dollars; the powder company was eventually made to pay $1.2 million in civil damages, but was acquitted of criminal wrongdoing.

Roseburg's downtown was rebuilt, primarily by businesses using money collected from insurance claims. The city built a new bridge over the South Umpqua River on parcels affected by the disaster. Since the incident, it is commonly referred to as the Roseburg Blast or simply "The Blast". In 2005, SOPTV produced a documentary examining the Blast and the experiences of those who were involved or witnessed it, entitled The Roseburg Blast: A Catastrophe and Its Heroes.

=== Mass shooting ===
On October 1, 2015, students at Umpqua Community College near Roseburg were attacked by a 26-year-old gunman that had recently moved to the area from Southern California, who killed nine people (eight students and an assistant professor) and injured nine others. The gunman, a student at the school, committed suicide following a gun battle with police. This was the second school shooting in the Roseburg area, the other being a 2006 shooting at Roseburg High School. On October 9, President Barack Obama privately visited families of victims of the shooting. During his visit Obama stayed in multiple places, including an Inn and the Roseburg High School band teacher's room, because it was the safest place in the high school while he was giving speeches in the school's theater. Hundreds of local residents protested the visit due to Obama's support of gun control legislation. In 1968, Bobby Kennedy had given a speech in Roseburg advocating for gun control for the mentally ill and for those with a "long criminal record" of murder.

== Geography ==
According to the United States Census Bureau, the city has a total area of 10.20 square miles (26.42 km^{2}), of which 10.01 square miles (25.93 km^{2}) is land and 0.19 square miles (0.49 km^{2}) is water.

Roseburg's elevation is approximately 500 feet (150 m). Its highest point is Mount Nebo, a 1,200-foot (370 m) hill to the west of Interstate 5. Through the 1980s, it was known for its band of 10 to 20 feral angora goats. Residents said they could predict the weather by watching where the goats were on the mountain; if they were high, the weather would be good. If rain was pending, the goats moved to lower levels. Because the goats wandered across the freeway for grazing, they were a risk to traffic. In the 1980s, they were rounded up and placed for adoption.

=== Climate ===
Roseburg has a Mediterranean climate (Köppen Csb borderline with Csa) with cool, rainy winters and very warm, dry summers. In a typical year, there are 30.9 days where the temperature reaches or exceeds 90 °F or 32.2 °C, and 2.7 days with a temperature of at least 100 °F or 37.8 °C. Conversely, the temperature drops to 32 °F (0 °C) or below 27.6 days a year. The record high temperature is 114 °F (45.6 °C), set on June 27, 2021, and the record low temperature is −1 °F (−18.3 °C), set on January 22, 1962.

In the summer, the area has little or no precipitation and plentiful sunshine — on average, 73.5 percent of days in July, August and September are at least partly sunny. There is also a much higher degree of diurnal temperature variation than in the winter. On the other hand, the majority of winter days are overcast and rainy — during this period, rainfalls of 8 inches (200 mm) per month are not uncommon, with as much as 15.74 inches (399.8 mm) during the record wet month of December 1955. Roseburg averages 30.7 inches (779.8 mm) of rain per year, more than half of which falls between November and January. The wettest "rain year" has been from July 1955 to June 1956 with 50.29 inches (1,277.4 mm) and the driest from July 2000 to June 2001 with only 18.43 inches (468.1 mm).

Light dustings of snow can sometimes be seen, but accumulations are rare. The most snowfall in a month is 23.4 inches (59 cm) in January 1950.

Climate data for Roseburg, Oregon (Roseburg Regional Airport), 1991–2020 normals, extremes 1900–present
Month	Jan	Feb	Mar	Apr	May	Jun	Jul	Aug	Sep	Oct	Nov	Dec	Year
Record high °F (°C)	71 (22)	79 (26)	83 (28)	95 (35)	105 (41)	114 (46)	109 (43)	109 (43)	105 (41)	96 (36)	77 (25)	70 (21)	114 (46)
Mean maximum °F (°C)	62.7 (17.1)	64.8 (18.2)	73.5 (23.1)	83.4 (28.6)	90.5 (32.5)	94.3 (34.6)	99.3 (37.4)	100.9 (38.3)	95.9 (35.5)	82.2 (27.9)	69.0 (20.6)	61.5 (16.4)	103.2 (39.6)
Mean daily maximum °F (°C)	50.1 (10.1)	53.7 (12.1)	58.7 (14.8)	63.3 (17.4)	71.0 (21.7)	76.7 (24.8)	85.8 (29.9)	85.9 (29.9)	80.1 (26.7)	66.9 (19.4)	54.2 (12.3)	48.2 (9.0)	66.2 (19.0)
Daily mean °F (°C)	43.6 (6.4)	45.7 (7.6)	49.2 (9.6)	52.9 (11.6)	59.5 (15.3)	64.6 (18.1)	71.6 (22.0)	71.5 (21.9)	66.1 (18.9)	56.1 (13.4)	47.4 (8.6)	42.5 (5.8)	55.9 (13.3)
Mean daily minimum °F (°C)	37.1 (2.8)	37.6 (3.1)	39.6 (4.2)	42.5 (5.8)	47.9 (8.8)	52.5 (11.4)	57.4 (14.1)	57.1 (13.9)	52.2 (11.2)	45.2 (7.3)	40.6 (4.8)	36.8 (2.7)	45.5 (7.5)
Mean minimum °F (°C)	27.8 (−2.3)	28.1 (−2.2)	30.4 (−0.9)	33.4 (0.8)	38.0 (3.3)	44.4 (6.9)	50.4 (10.2)	50.2 (10.1)	43.3 (6.3)	34.2 (1.2)	30.2 (−1.0)	26.3 (−3.2)	22.5 (−5.3)
Record low °F (°C)	−1 (−18)	13 (−11)	19 (−7)	25 (−4)	26 (−3)	34 (1)	39 (4)	41 (5)	32 (0)	21 (−6)	15 (−9)	5 (−15)	−1 (−18)
Average precipitation inches (mm)	4.82 (122)	3.62 (92)	3.47 (88)	2.71 (69)	2.09 (53)	0.93 (24)	0.26 (6.6)	0.23 (5.8)	0.85 (22)	2.32 (59)	4.72 (120)	6.05 (154)	32.07 (815.4)
Average snowfall inches (cm)	2.3 (5.8)	0.5 (1.3)	0.4 (1.0)	0.1 (0.25)	0.0 (0.0)	0.0 (0.0)	0.0 (0.0)	0.0 (0.0)	0.0 (0.0)	0.0 (0.0)	0.5 (1.3)	0.6 (1.5)	4.4 (11.15)
Average precipitation days (≥ 0.01 in)	17.8	16.8	16.9	14.8	11.2	6.0	1.3	1.5	4.6	12.1	18.3	19.8	141.1
Source 1: NOAA
Source 2: National Weather Service

== Demographics ==
Historical population
Census	Pop.	Note	%±
1860	835		—
1870	600		−28.1%
1880	822		37.0%
1890	1,472		79.1%
1900	1,690		14.8%
1910	4,738		180.4%
1920	4,258		−10.1%
1930	4,362		2.4%
1940	4,924		12.9%
1950	8,390		70.4%
1960	11,467		36.7%
1970	14,461		26.1%
1980	16,644		15.1%
1990	17,032		2.3%
2000	20,017		17.5%
2010	21,181		5.8%
2020	23,683		11.8%
Source: United States Census Bureau; U.S. Decennial Census; 2018 Estimate

=== 2020 census ===
As of the 2020 census, Roseburg had a population of 23,683. The median age was 42.1 years. 19.9% of residents were under the age of 18 and 23.5% of residents were 65 years of age or older. For every 100 females there were 94.4 males, and for every 100 females age 18 and over there were 91.4 males age 18 and over.

The 2020 census showed that 99.0% of residents lived in urban areas, while 1.0% lived in rural areas.

There were 9,961 households in Roseburg, of which 24.3% had children under the age of 18 living in them. Of all households, 39.0% were married-couple households, 21.0% were households with a male householder and no spouse or partner present, and 31.4% were households with a female householder and no spouse or partner present. About 34.8% of all households were made up of individuals and 16.8% had someone living alone who was 65 years of age or older.

There were 10,642 housing units, of which 6.4% were vacant. Among occupied housing units, 52.7% were owner-occupied and 47.3% were renter-occupied. The homeowner vacancy rate was 1.7% and the rental vacancy rate was 5.5%.

Racial composition as of the 2020 census
Race	Number	Percent
White	20,163	85.1%
Black or African American	130	0.5%
American Indian and Alaska Native	404	1.7%
Asian	373	1.6%
Native Hawaiian and Other Pacific Islander	47	0.2%
Some other race	603	2.5%
Two or more races	1,963	8.3%
Hispanic or Latino (of any race)	1,789	7.6%

=== 2010 census ===
As of the census of 2010, there were 21,181 people, 9,081 households, and 5,177 families residing in the city. The population density was 2,116.0 inhabitants per square mile (817.0/km^{2}). There were 9,732 housing units at an average density of 972.2 per square mile (375.4/km^{2}). The racial makeup of the city was 91% White, 0.5% African American, 1.7% Native American, 1.6% Asian, 0.3% Pacific Islander, 1.4% from other races, and 3.5% from two or more races. Hispanic or Latino of any race were 5.5% of the population.

There were 9,081 households, of which 27.0% had children under the age of 18 living with them, 39.2% were married couples living together, 13.2% had a female householder with no husband present, 4.6% had a male householder with no wife present, and 43.0% were non-families. 35.5% of all households were made up of individuals, and 16.8% had someone living alone who was 65 years of age or older. The average household size was 2.23 and the average family size was 2.84.

The median age in the city was 41.1 years. 21.7% of residents were under the age of 18; 9.1% were between the ages of 18 and 24; 23.8% were from 25 to 44; 26.2% were from 45 to 64; and 19.1% were 65 years of age or older. The gender makeup of the city was 48.0% male and 52.0% female.

=== 2000 census ===
As of the census of 2000, there were 20,017 people, 8,237 households, and 5,098 families residing in the city. The population density was 2,171.1 inhabitants per square mile (838.3/km^{2}). There were 8,838 housing units at an average density of 958.6 per square mile (370.1/km^{2}). The racial makeup of the city was 93.56% White, 0.3% African American, 1.3% Native American, 0.99% Asian, 0.1% Pacific Islander, 1.26% from other races, and 2.48% from two or more races. Hispanic or Latino of any race were 3.73% of the population.

There were 8,237 households, out of which 28.9% had children under the age of 18 living with them, 46.2% were married couples living together, 11.9% had a female householder with no husband present, and 38.1% were non-families. 31.6% of all households were made up of individuals, and 13.9% had someone living alone who was 65 years of age or older. The average household size was 2.32 and the average family size was 2.88.

In the city, the population was spread out, with 23.2% under the age of 18, 8.9% from 18 to 24, 26.5% from 25 to 44, 22.4% from 45 to 64, and 18.9% who were 65 years of age or older. The median age was 39 years. For every 100 females, there were 93.7 males. For every 100 females age 18 and over, there were 91.5 males.

The median income for a household in the city was $31,250, and the median income for a family was $40,172. Males had a median income of $32,624 versus $25,707 for females. The per capita income for the city was $17,082. About 11.0% of families and 15.1% of the population were below the poverty line, including 18.9% of those under age 18 and 9.2% of those age 65 or over.

== Education ==
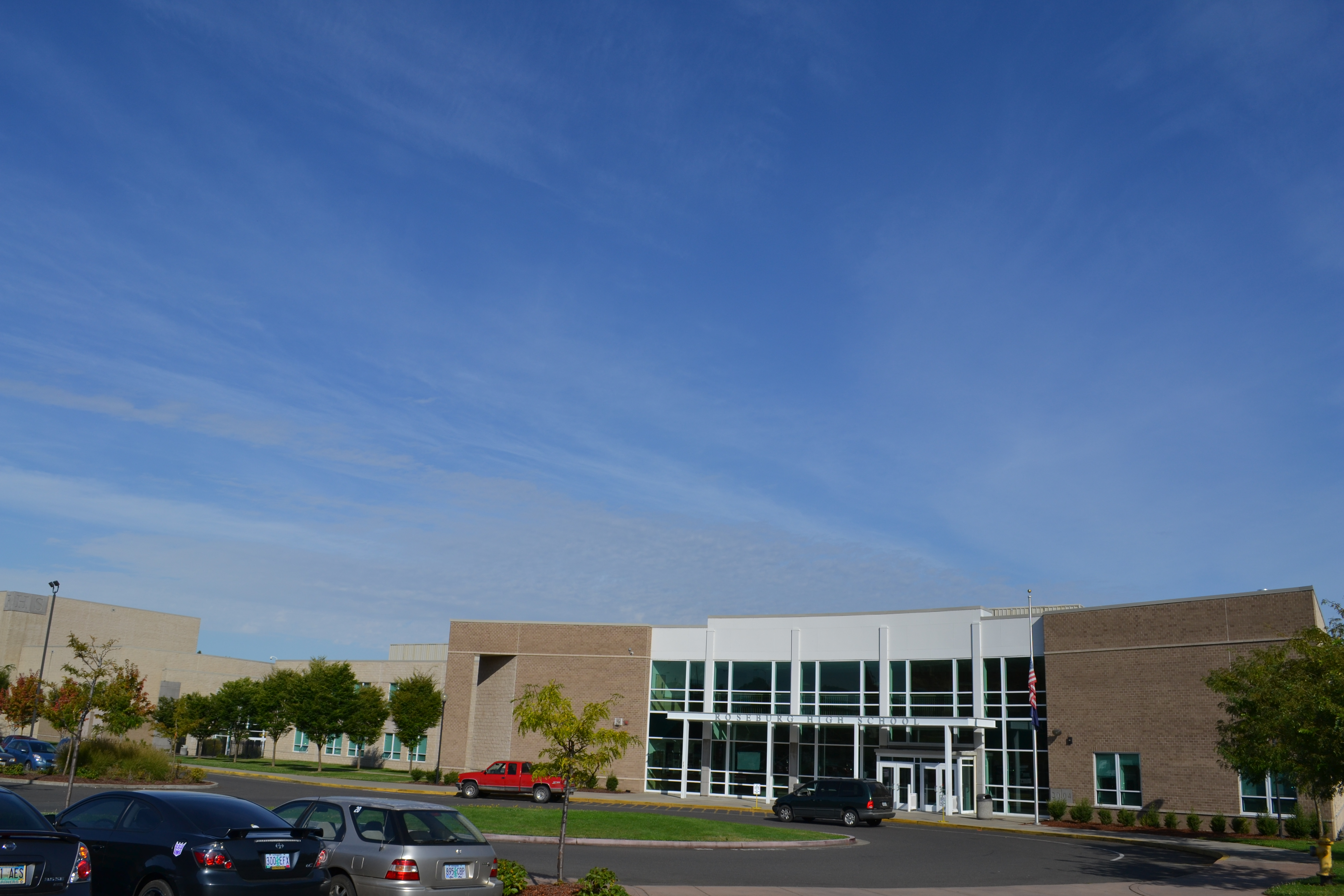
Roseburg High School

Primary and secondary public education in Roseburg are provided by the Roseburg School District. Umpqua Community College is the city's two-year college.

== Economy ==
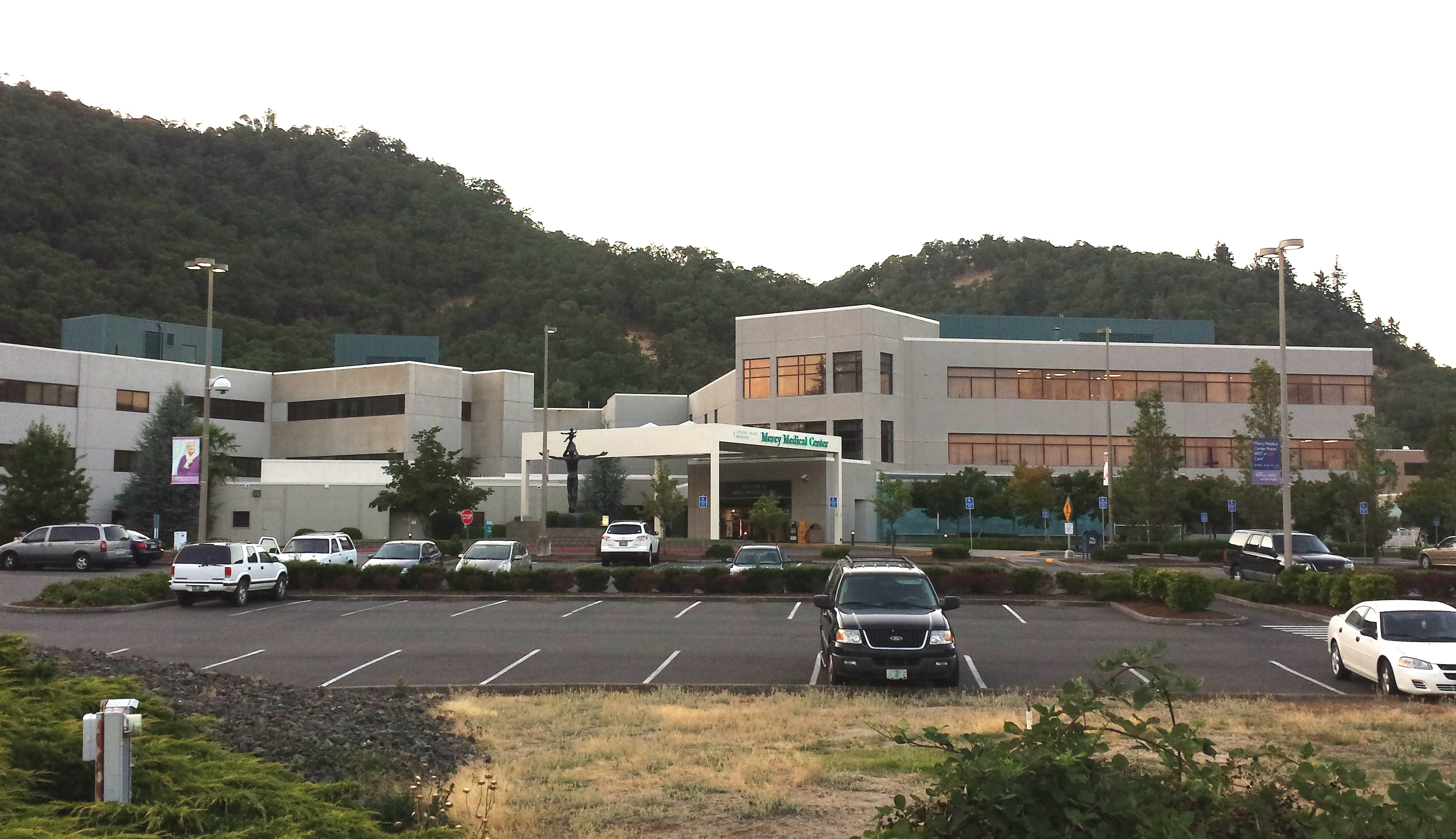
Mercy Medical Center, a 178-bed hospital. Mercy is the 2nd largest employer in the town of Roseburg.

The unemployment rate in Roseburg is about 6.9 percent. During the Great Recession of 2009, the unemployment rate peaked at 16.5% before falling. In 2012, the largest employer in the town was Roseburg Forest Products and Mercy Medical Center was the second largest.

== Media ==
In 2018, the City of Roseburg opened its own library. Previously, the city's library had been part of the Douglas County Library System but was closed when county libraries lost public funding.

=== Newspapers ===
There are three newspapers serving Roseburg. NRToday (Previously The News Review) is a digitally published newspaper. The Roseburg Beacon is published weekly and serves Roseburg. The Douglas County News is published weekly and is based in the nearby town of Sutherlin.

=== Radio ===
AM

- KGRV 700 Religious
- KTBR 950 JPR News and Information
- KQEN 1240 News/Talk
- KSKR 1490 Sports

FM

- KMPQ 88.1 NPR Variety
- KEAR 88.5 Family Radio – Religious
- KLOV 89.3 K-Love – Contemporary Christian
- KAWZ 90.7 CSN – Religious
- KSRS 91.5 JPR Classics and News
- KSMF 91.9 JPR Rhythm and News
- KCNA 98.3 Classic Hits
- KQUA 99.7 Community Radio
- KSKR-FM 100.9 i101 – Top 40
- KZEL-FM 102.1 Classic Rock
- KRSB-FM 103.1 Country
- KROG 103.7 Modern Rock
- KKMX 104.5 Sam FM – Adult Hits
- KYTT 105.5 Contemporary Christian
- KLLF-LP 106.7 Religious

=== Television ===
Channel	Callsign	Network	Notes
18 (36.1)	KTVC	3ABN	Satellite of KBLN-TV, Grants Pass
19 (4.1)	KPIC	CBS	Satellite of KVAL-TV, Eugene
41	K41JQ	NBC	Repeater of KOBI, Medford
45 (46.1)	KTCW	NBC	Satellite of KMTR, Eugene
46	K46KS-D	ABC	Repeater of KEZI, Eugene
47	K47HT	3ABN	Repeater of KBLN-TV, Grants Pass
51	K51GJ-D	PBS/OPB	Repeater of KEPB, Eugene

== Transportation ==
=== Roads ===
Oregon Route 99 runs through downtown Roseburg as the main north–south arterial. Interstate 5 runs along the west side of the city, across the South Umpqua River from downtown. Oregon Route 138 runs northwest from Roseburg to Elkton, Oregon, and generally east from Roseburg to its terminus at a junction with U.S. Route 97, just east of Diamond Lake and Crater Lake.

=== Buses ===
Roseburg and surrounding communities are regionally served by U-Trans (formerly Umpqua Transit), the local bus service. In 2017, these services were significantly expanded.

Greyhound Lines provide the community of Roseburg with more distant transportation.

=== Airports ===
There are two public airports, Marion E. Carl Memorial Field at the north end of town and George Felt Airport to the west. Eugene Airport is the nearest commercial airport, which is 81 miles (130 km) away.

== Notable people ==
- Mike Allred – comic book artist, DJ KYES
- Dave Archer – artist, resident since 1999
- H. Guy Bedwell – thoroughbred trainer in Racing Hall of Fame
- Barbara Hibbs Blake – mammalogist
- Tim Blixseth – real estate developer, songwriter, fraudster
- Knute Buehler - Rhodes scholar, MD, inventor, starting pitcher for OSU, former state representative
- Jamie Burke – baseball player for four MLB teams
- Troy Calhoun – head coach of the United States Air Force Academy football team
- Marion Eugene Carl – Marine Corps general and flying ace
- Guy Cordon – U.S. Senator, Douglas County District Attorney
- Wes DeMott – author
- Chuck Eisenmann – professional baseball pitcher
- Bill Fisher - politician
- Jeremy Guthrie – professional baseball pitcher
- Bobby Henderson - founder of the Church of the Flying Spaghetti Monster
- Tyler Hentschel – lead singer of Insomniac Folklore
- Scott Higgins - Major League Baseball Umpire
- David Hume Kennerly – 1972 Pulitzer Prize winner and photographer who served as the Chief Official White House Photographer
- John Kitzhaber – Oregon governor, 1995–2003, 2011–2015
- William W. Knight – publisher of The Oregon Journal
- Joseph Lane – general and early governor of Oregon
- Jason Latimer - magician and illusionist
- Matthew Lessner – director and screenwriter
- Lucy A. Rose Mallory - (1846–1920), editor
- Nancy A. Norton. Vice Admiral, USN
- Shelley Plimpton – former actress
- Landon Rabern – mathematician, computer scientist
- Barry Serafin – television journalist
- Alek Skarlatos – recipient of the Knights of the Legion of Honour
- Craig Tanner – film director, producer, editor
- Chris Thompson - 2000 Olympic bronze medalist in swimming
- ZZ Ward – musician, singer, songwriter

== Sister cities ==
Roseburg has three sister cities:

- Aranda de Duero, Castile and León, Spain
- Kuki (formerly Shōbu), Saitama, Japan
- Kermanshah, Iran

== See also ==
- Mill–Pine Neighborhood Historic District
- Roseburg North, Oregon
