= Sutherlin, Oregon =

- City
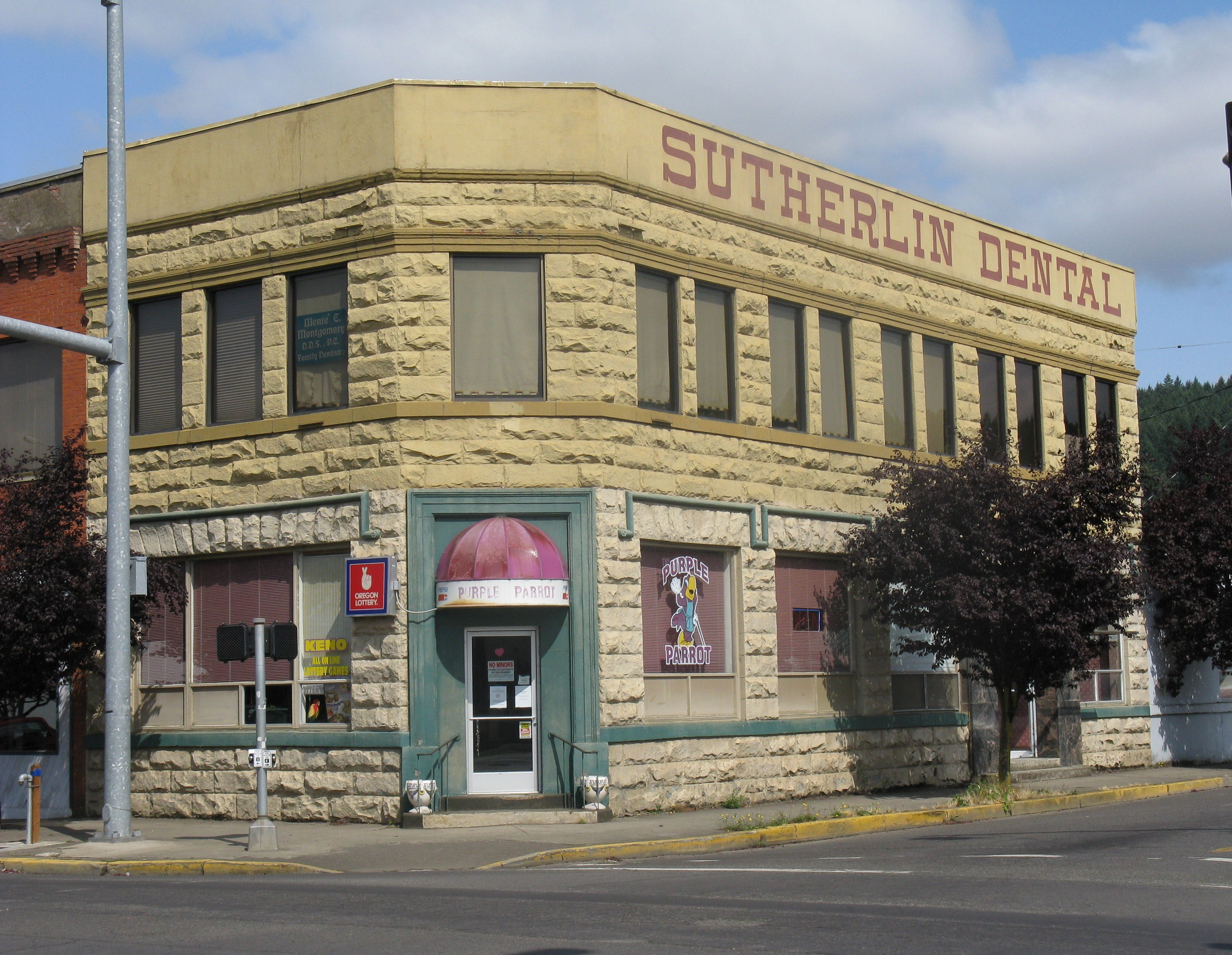
- The historic Sutherlin Bank Building (built 1910), located at 101 West Central Avenue in Sutherlin
- Nickname: City of Flags
- Location in Oregon
- Coordinates: 43°22′48″N 123°19′23″W
- Country: United States
- State: Oregon
- County: Douglas
- Incorporated: 1911

Government
  - Mayor: Todd McKnight

Area
  - Total: 6.19 sq mi (16.04 km^{2})
  - Land: 6.11 sq mi (15.83 km^{2})
  - Water: 0.081 sq mi (0.21 km^{2})
- Elevation: 525 ft (160 m)

Population (2020)
  - Total: 8,524
  - Density: 1,394.8/sq mi (538.53/km^{2})
- Time zone: UTC-8 (Pacific)
  - Summer (DST): UTC-7 (Pacific)
- ZIP code: 97479
- Area code: 541
- FIPS code: 41-71650
- GNIS feature ID: 2412018
- Website: www.sutherlinoregon.gov

Sutherlin is a city in Douglas County, Oregon, United States. As of the 2020 census, Sutherlin had a population of 8,524, making it the second most populous city in Douglas County. Located just off of Interstate 5, nearby features include Cooper Creek Reservoir, Ford's Pond (treated wastewater), the Umpqua River, a golf course, and numerous vineyards.

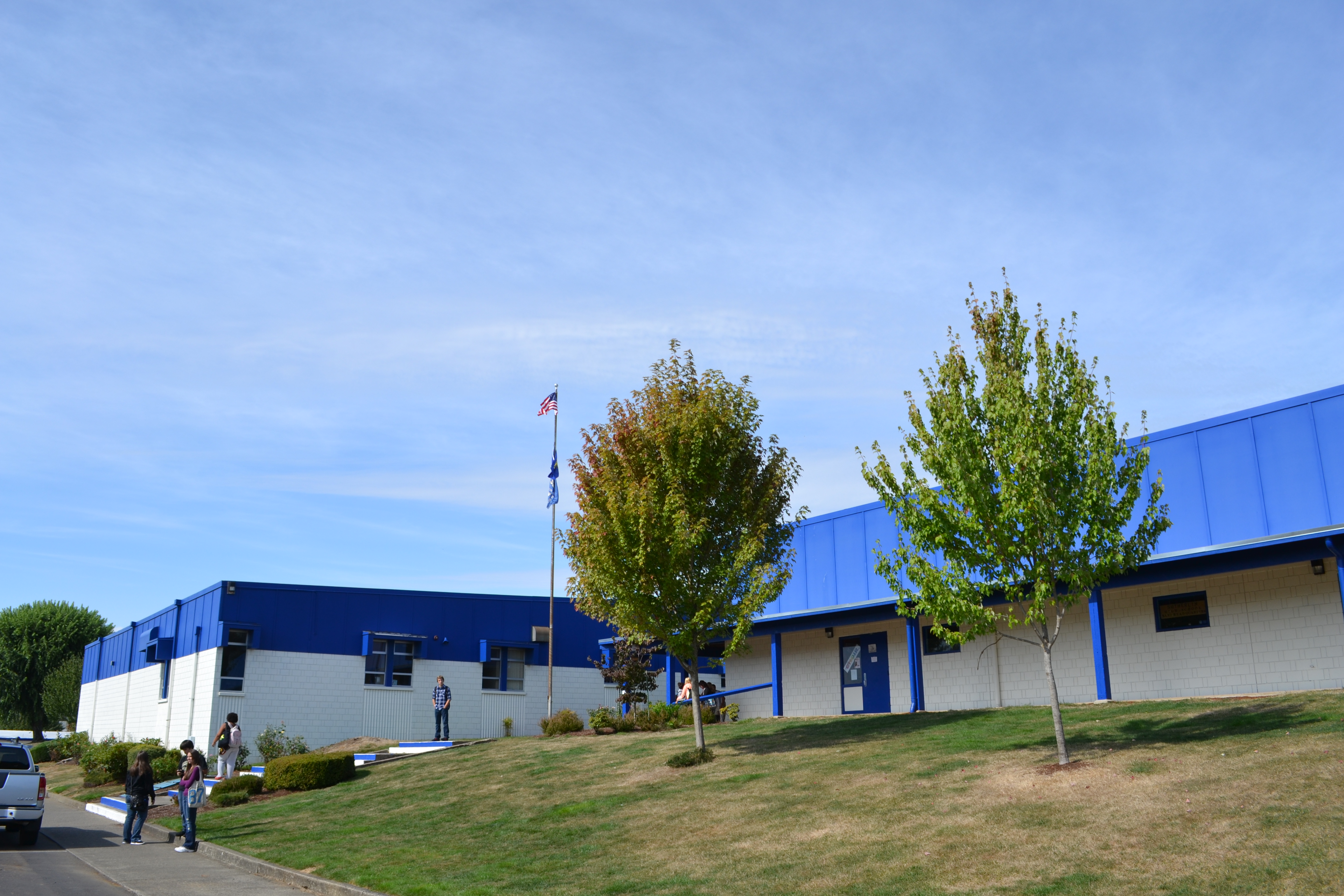
Sutherlin High School

The City of Sutherlin Police Department also serves the City of Oakland via a paid contract.

== Geography and climate ==
According to the United States Census Bureau, the city has a total area of 6.35 square miles (16.45 km^{2}), of which 6.15 square miles (15.93 km^{2}) is land and 0.20 square miles (0.52 km^{2}) is water.

Sutherlin has the typical western Oregon Mediterranean climate (Köppen: Csb), characterized by dry summers featuring cool mornings and hot afternoons, and chilly, wet winters.

Climate data for Sutherlin, OR
Month	Jan	Feb	Mar	Apr	May	Jun	Jul	Aug	Sep	Oct	Nov	Dec	Year
Mean daily maximum °F (°C)	49 (9)	53 (12)	58 (14)	62 (17)	69 (21)	75 (24)	83 (28)	84 (29)	78 (26)	67 (19)	53 (12)	47 (8)	65 (18)
Mean daily minimum °F (°C)	36 (2)	36 (2)	38 (3)	41 (5)	46 (8)	51 (11)	55 (13)	54 (12)	49 (9)	43 (6)	40 (4)	36 (2)	44 (6)
Average precipitation inches (mm)	5.30 (135)	4.31 (109)	3.68 (93)	2.96 (75)	2.20 (56)	1.10 (28)	0.37 (9.4)	0.43 (11)	0.96 (24)	2.49 (63)	6.00 (152)	6.70 (170)	36.5 (925.4)

== Demographics ==
Historical population
Census	Pop.	Note	%±
1920	515		—
1930	457		−11.3%
1940	525		14.9%
1950	2,230		324.8%
1960	2,452		10.0%
1970	3,070		25.2%
1980	4,560		48.5%
1990	5,020		10.1%
2000	6,668		32.8%
2010	7,810		17.1%
2020	8,524		9.1%
2021 (est.)	8,593		0.8%
U.S. Decennial Census

=== 2020 census ===
As of the 2020 census, Sutherlin had a population of 8,524. The median age was 46.2 years; 20.5% of residents were under the age of 18 and 27.9% were 65 years of age or older. For every 100 females there were 93.2 males, and for every 100 females age 18 and over there were 90.4 males age 18 and over.

97.2% of residents lived in urban areas, while 2.8% lived in rural areas.

There were 3,513 households, of which 25.2% had children under the age of 18 living in them. Of all households, 47.6% were married-couple households, 17.5% were households with a male householder and no spouse or partner present, and 27.2% were households with a female householder and no spouse or partner present. About 27.0% of all households were made up of individuals and 15.8% had someone living alone who was 65 years of age or older. There were 3,730 housing units, of which 5.8% were vacant. Among occupied housing units, 69.9% were owner-occupied and 30.1% were renter-occupied. The homeowner vacancy rate was 2.1% and the rental vacancy rate was 5.6%.

Racial composition as of the 2020 census
Race	Number	Percent
White	7,277	85.4%
Black or African American	23	0.3%
American Indian and Alaska Native	170	2.0%
Asian	70	0.8%
Native Hawaiian and Other Pacific Islander	6	0.1%
Some other race	165	1.9%
Two or more races	813	9.5%
Hispanic or Latino (of any race)	681	8.0%

=== 2010 census ===
As of the census of 2010, there were 7,810 people, 3,249 households, and 2,178 families living in the city. The population density was 1,269.9 inhabitants per square mile (490.3/km^{2}). There were 3,566 housing units at an average density of 579.8 per square mile (223.9/km^{2}). The racial makeup of the city was 92.4% White, 0.2% African American, 1.9% Native American, 0.6% Asian, 0.1% Pacific Islander, 1.8% from other races, and 2.9% from two or more races. Hispanic or Latino of any race were 6.1% of the population.

There were 3,249 households, of which 27.3% had children under the age of 18 living with them, 51.6% were married couples living together, 11.4% had a female householder with no husband present, 4.1% had a male householder with no wife present, and 33.0% were non-families. 27.3% of all households were made up of individuals, and 14.8% had someone living alone who was 65 years of age or older. The average household size was 2.37 and the average family size was 2.86.

The median age in the city was 44.8 years. 22.4% of residents were under the age of 18; 6.6% were between the ages of 18 and 24; 21.2% were from 25 to 44; 25.7% were from 45 to 64; and 24% were 65 years of age or older. The gender makeup of the city was 47.6% male and 52.4% female.

=== 2000 census ===
As of the census of 2000, there were 6,669 people, 2,713 households, and 1,909 families living in the city. The population density was 1,283.2 inhabitants per square mile (495.4/km^{2}). There were 2,975 housing units at an average density of 572.4 per square mile (221.0/km^{2}). The racial makeup of the city was 93.79% White, 0.13% African American, 1.72% Native American, 0.51% Asian, 0.06% Pacific Islander, 1.09% from other races, and 2.68% from two or more races. Hispanic or Latino of any race were 3.97% of the population.

There were 2,713 households, out of which 30.0% had children under the age of 18 living with them, 56.7% were married couples living together, 9.8% had a female householder with no husband present, and 29.6% were non-families. 24.5% of all households were made up of individuals, and 14.5% had someone living alone who was 65 years of age or older. The average household size was 2.46 and the average family size was 2.88.

In the city, the population was spread out, with 25.0% under the age of 18, 6.7% from 18 to 24, 24.9% from 25 to 44, 22.0% from 45 to 64, and 21.3% who were 65 years of age or older. The median age was 40 years. For every 100 females, there were 91.5 males. For every 100 females age 18 and over, there were 86.9 males.

The median income for a household in the city was $29,068, and the median income for a family was $34,414. Males had a median income of $32,047 versus $20,911 for females. The per capita income for the city was $13,439. About 12.4% of families and 14.9% of the population were below the poverty line, including 16.5% of those under age 18 and 9.1% of those age 65 or over.
