= Union Creek =

Union Creek may refer to:

- Union Creek Historic District
- Union Creek, Ontario, a community in Kawartha Lakes
- Union Creek, Oregon
- Union Creek (Rogue River), a stream in southern Oregon
- Union Creek (South Dakota)
