= Rogue-Umpqua Scenic Byway =

Scenic highway in Oregon, United States

Rogue-Umpqua Scenic Byway
- Rogue-Umpqua Scenic Byway highlighted in red

Route information
- Maintained by ODOT
- Length: 167.22 mi (269.11 km)

Major junctions
- North end: I-5 / OR 138 in Roseburg
- midpoint north of Crater Lake
- South end: I-5 / OR 234 in Gold Hill

Location
- Country: United States
- State: Oregon
- Counties: Douglas, Jackson

Highway system
- Scenic Byways; National; National Forest; BLM; NPS; Oregon Highways; Interstate; US; State; Named; Scenic

The Rogue-Umpqua Scenic Byway is a National Scenic Byway in the U.S. state of Oregon. It provides a tour of the environs of the North Umpqua River, the High Cascades, and the Upper Rogue River.

== Route description ==
Starting from Roseburg on OR 138, at the junction with Interstate 5, the scenic byway travels eastward. Near Glide, it begins to parallel the North Umpqua River. It continues roughly eastward until it meets Diamond Lake, where it turns southward along the east shore of the lake. Near the southern tip of the lake the scenic byway turns west and then southwest on OR 230. Here it follows the Rogue River, eventually merges with OR 62 near Union Creek. On its last leg the route meets up with OR 234 and passes near Upper and Lower Table Rock. The byway's terminus is at Gold Hill. The entire scenic byway is 172 miles (277 km) long.

== History ==
The road was designated a National Forest Scenic Byway on October 21, 1990, by the National Forest Service. It was later named an Oregon State Scenic Byway on February 19, 1997, and a National Scenic Byway on June 13, 2002.

== Major intersections ==
County	Location	mi	km	Destinations	Notes
Douglas	Roseburg	0.00	0.00	I-5 west / OR 138 – Medford, Portland	Western end of OR 138 overlap
Douglas	Roseburg	0.52– 0.64	0.84– 1.03	OR 99 south (SE Pine Street) / SE Stephens Street – Winston	Southern end of OR 99 overlap
Douglas	Roseburg	0.88	1.42	OR 99 north (SE Stephens Street) – Diamond Lake, Crater Lake	Northern end of OR 99 overlap
Douglas	Diamond Lake	83.90	135.02	OR 138 east to US 97 – Crater Lake, Bend OR 230 begins	Eastern end of OR 138 overlap; northern end of OR 230 overlap
Jackson	Union Creek	107.70	173.33	OR 230 ends OR 62 west – Crater Lake	Southern end of OR 230 overlap; northern end of OR 62 overlap
Jackson	Trail	142.59	229.48	Tiller, Canyonville	Former OR 227
Jackson		151.38	243.62	OR 62 west – Eagle Point, Medford OR 234 begins	
Jackson	Gold Hill	166.50	267.96	OR 99 north / OR 234 west – Grants Pass	Southern end of OR 234 overlap; northern end of OR 99 overlap
Jackson		166.90	268.60	Blackwell Road	Former US 99 south
Jackson		167.22	269.11	I-5 / OR 99 south – Grants Pass, Medford	Southern end of OR 99 overlap
1.000 mi = 1.609 km; 1.000 km = 0.621 mi: Concurrency terminus
