= Pass Creek (Elk Creek tributary) =

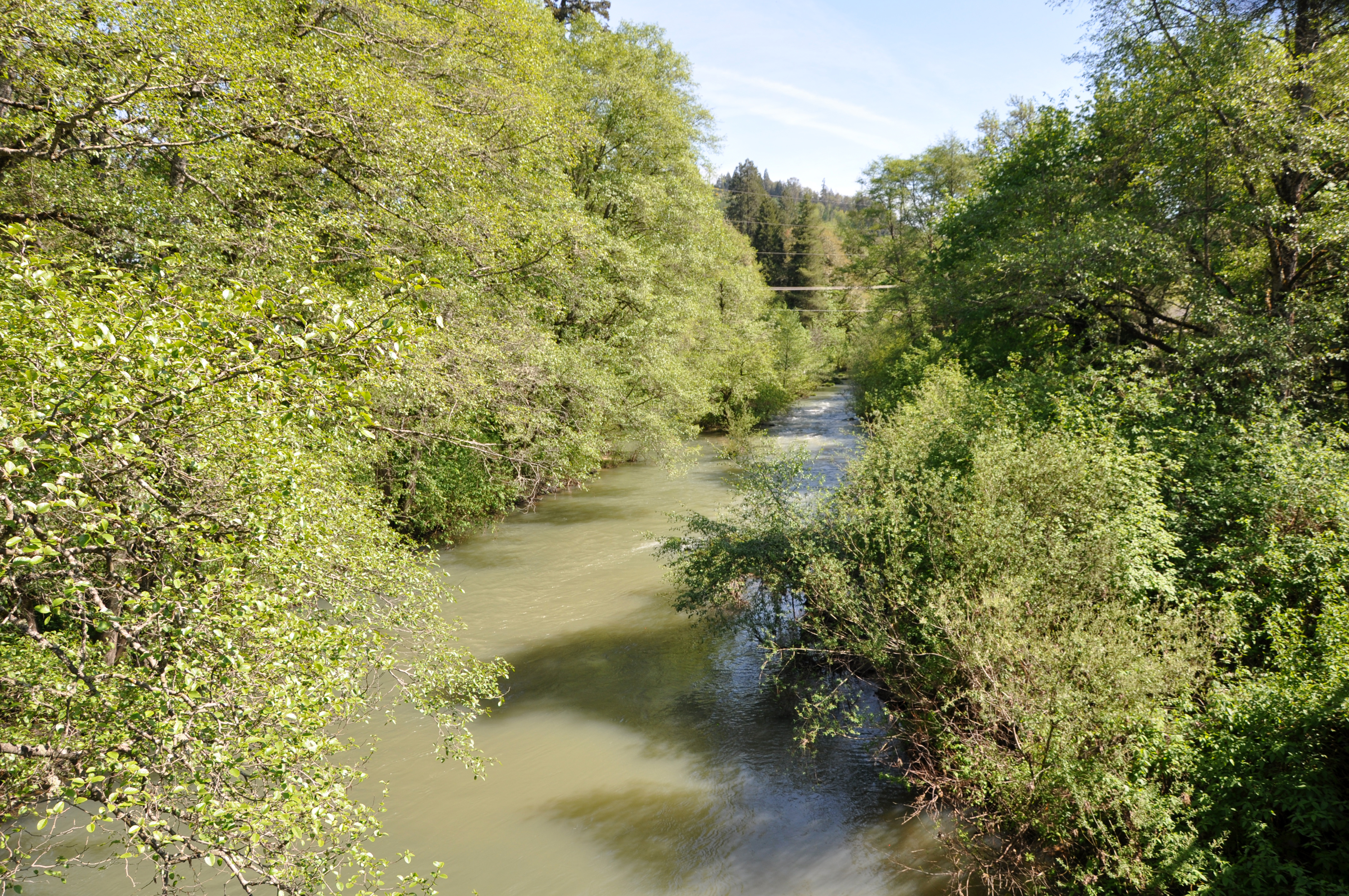
- Looking downstream from a bridge in Drain

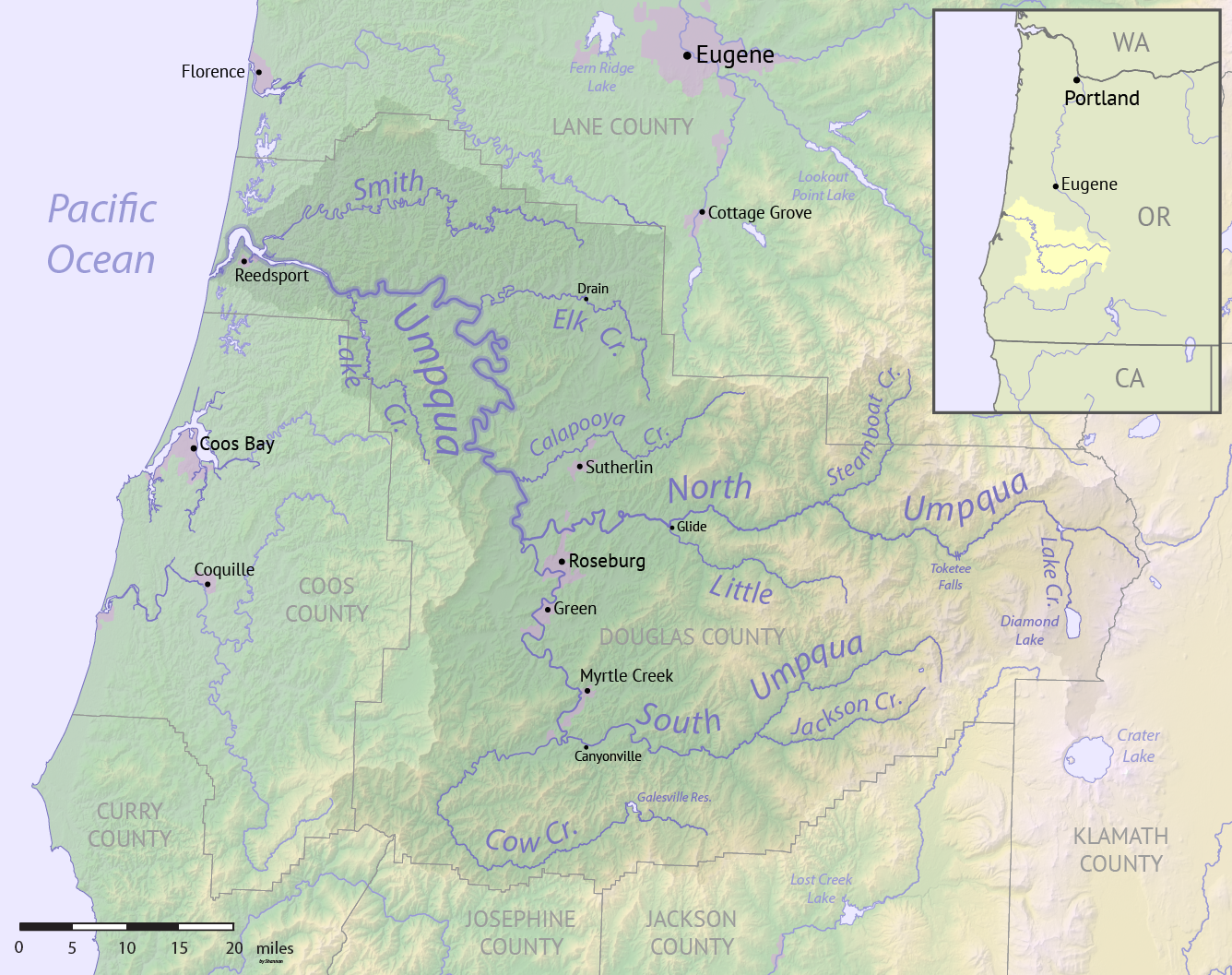
- Map of the Umpqua River watershed

- Location of the mouth of Pass Creek in Oregon

Location
- Country: United States
- State: Oregon
- County: Douglas, Lane

Physical characteristics
- Source
  - location: Divide, Lane County
  - coordinates: 43°45′06″N 123°07′37″W
  - elevation: 735 ft (224 m)
- Mouth: Elk Creek
  - location: Drain, Douglas County
  - coordinates: 43°39′41″N 123°19′06″W
  - elevation: 282 ft (86 m)

Pass Creek is a tributary of Elk Creek in the Umpqua River basin of the U.S. state of Oregon. It begins at Divide between the Coast Fork Willamette River watershed and the Umpqua watershed along Interstate 5 (I-5) in Lane County. It flows west into Douglas County and continues generally southwest to meet Elk Creek at the city of Drain, 24 miles (39 km) upstream of Elk Creek's confluence with the Umpqua.

From Divide through Curtin to Anlauf, I-5 runs along Pass Creek's upper reaches. Downstream of Anlauf, concurrent highways, Oregon Route 38 and Oregon Route 99, follow the creek to Drain. Named tributaries of Pass Creek from source to mouth are Ward, Bear, Pheasant, Buck, Rock, Sand, and Fitch creeks. Further downstream are Johnson, Krewson, and Hedrick creeks.

== Camping ==
Pass Creek Park, managed by Douglas County, is along the creek near Curtin and I-5 exit 163. The park serves as an overnight campground for recreational vehicles, pickup campers, and tents, as well as a day-use area. Amenities include fire rings, fishing sites, a pavilion, picnic tables, a play structure, restrooms, and showers.

== Covered bridge ==
Pass Creek Bridge, a covered bridge, once carried stagecoaches and then motor vehicles over Pass Creek in Drain before being moved a few hundred feet from its original location in 1987 and reassembled behind the Drain Civic Center. Through 2014, when the city closed the deteriorating bridge completely, it carried pedestrian traffic.

== See also ==
- List of rivers of Oregon
