= Eva (sternwheeler) =

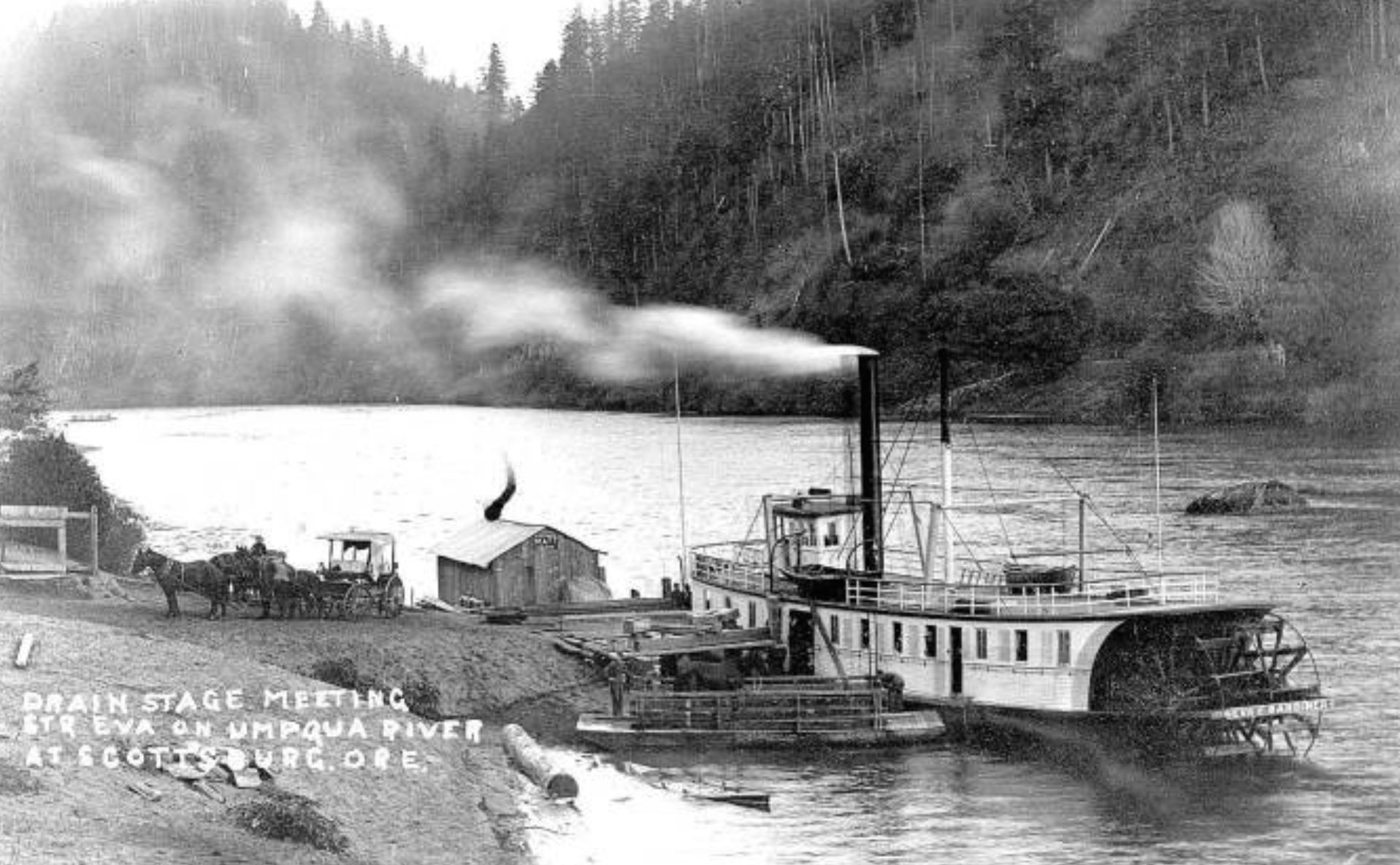
- Eva meeting the Drain stage at Scottsburg, OR

History
- Name: Eva
- Owner: Umpqua River Navigation Company
- Port of registry: Coos Bay, Oregon
- In service: 1894
- Out of service: 1917
- Identification: U.S. 136459
- Fate: Dismantled, converted to scow

General characteristics
- Type: Inland passenger
- Tonnage: 130.57 gross tons; 66.67 net tons
- Length: 103 ft (31.39 m)
- Beam: 16.2 ft (4.94 m)
- Draft: 2.5 ft (0.76 m)
- Depth of hold: 4.3 ft (1.31 m); in 1923: 4.3 ft (1.31 m)
- Decks: one
- Installed power: twin steam engines, horizontally mounted, 80 nominal horsepower.
- Propulsion: sternwheel

Eva was a sternwheel steamboat that was operated on the Umpqua River on the Oregon coast in the early part of the 1900s. Eva was notable for long service on a short route of about 20 miles. Eva was also notable for having been used by one of its owners to illegally transport dynamite on a passenger-carrying vessel, by the ruse of labeling the dynamite boxes as "bacon."

== Construction ==
Eva was built in 1894 at Portland, Oregon. Following construction, Eva was brought under tow, with a load of flour on board, from Portland to Gardiner, Oregon, where the engines were installed.

Eva was 90.4 ft (27.55 m) long, with a beam of 19.4 ft (5.91 m) and 4.6 ft (1.40 m) depth of hold. Eva measured out at 130.57 gross tons and 66.67 net tons. The boat's draft was 2.5 ft (0.76 m). The official U.S. merchant vessel registration number was 136459. The port of registry was Coos Bay, Oregon.

Eva was powered by twin steam engines, horizontally mounted, driving a sternwheel. The engines generated 80 nominal horsepower.

== Ownership and personnel ==
Eva was owned by the Umpqua River Steam Navigation Company, of which Oscar B. Hinsdale (1867–1918) was a principal, as was W.F. Jewett. Hinsdale was a businessman and a prominent citizen of Gardiner, Oregon, who was also connected with the Gardiner Mill Company. Capt. N.J. Cornwall (b.1855) was also interested in the navigation company and as of 1895 was also in command of Eva.

Capt. "Jimmy" Smith had been a well-known and popular master of Eva. Of Smith, it was reported that he "always insisted on getting everything that was coming to the company."

Starting in about 1898, Frank Sagabird was the engineer of the Eva and held that position until the boat was retired from active service in April 1916. His brother Capt. Henry Sagabird was also a master of Eva for over ten years, starting in about 1906 and continuing, like his brother, until the boat was withdrawn from service.

== Route ==
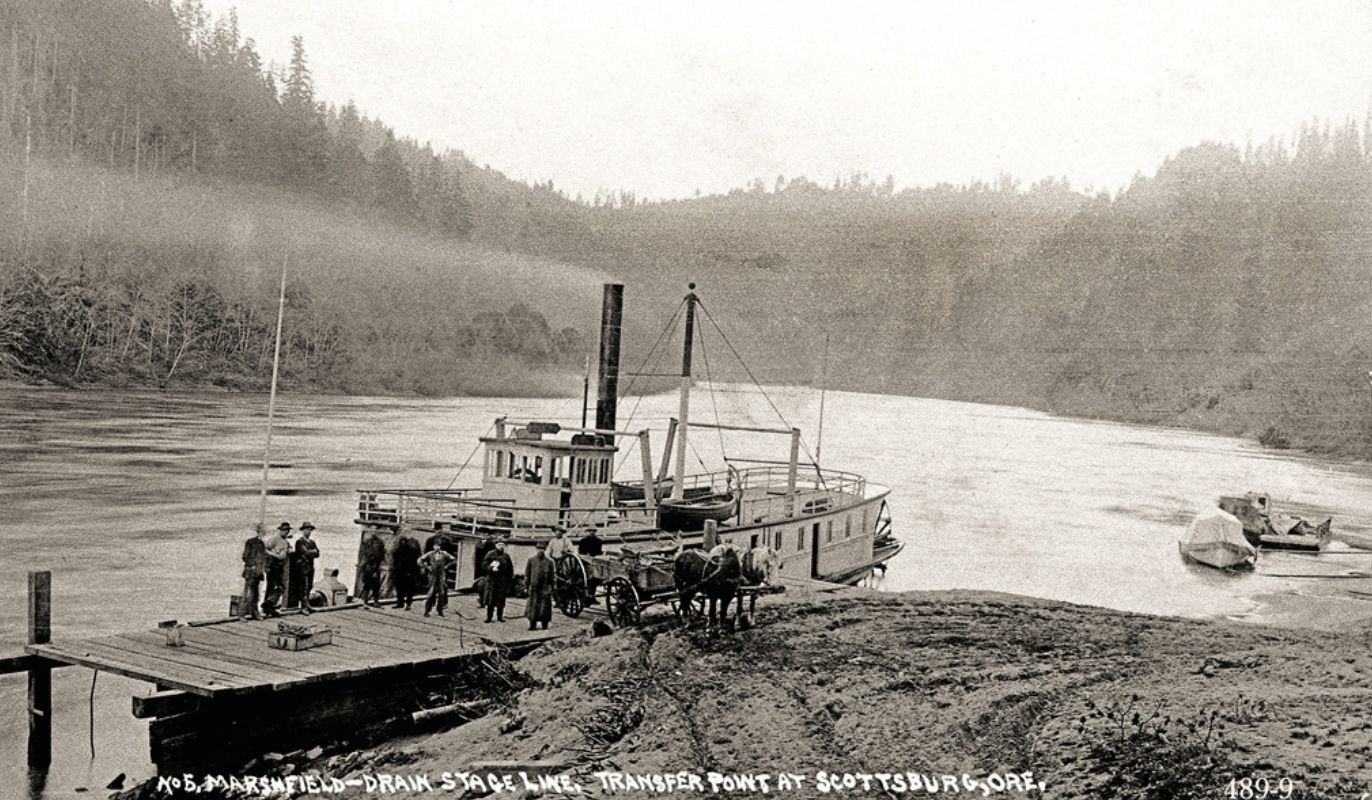
Eva at the Scottsburg landing, meeting the Drain stage. View here is downriver.

From 1876 to 1916, the Drain-Coos Bay stage line provided for travellers from Drain, Oregon to proceed by stage coach to Scottsburg, where they would meet a steamboat to proceed down the Umpqua river. Eva and other steamboats on the river provided an important link in the line by providing riverine service between Scottsburg and Gardiner, Oregon.

For travellers going to or coming from Coos Bay, Eva made a run from Gardiner to a beach near Winchester Bay, close to the mouth of the Umpqua river on the south side, where another stage route ran south towards Coos Bay along the beach. It was reportedly either 17.5 or 20 miles on the water from Scottsburg to Gardiner. It was a further nine miles from Gardiner to the south beach.

The stages were run by the Drain-Coos Bay Stage Company, which had been organized by the same people as the navigation company, that is, Capt. N.J. Cornwall, W.P. Jewett, and O.B. Hinsdale.

== Operations ==
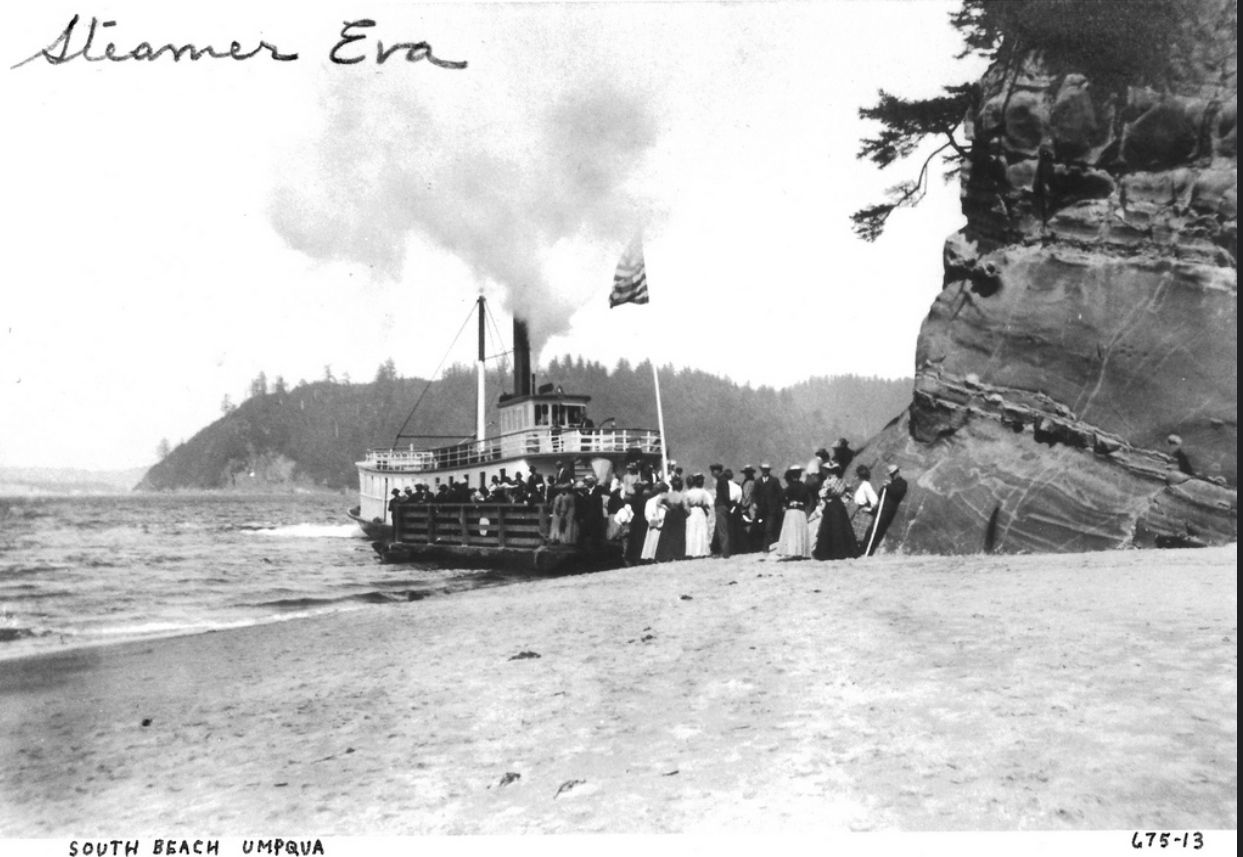
Eva at the South Beach on the Umpqua River, where passengers transferred to and from the beach stage

Once at Winchester, passengers from Eva could take a stage coach from Gardiner on to Coos Bay, although by 1915, the beach stage coach had been replaced with an "auto stage."

During the year 1896, Eva carried 2,600 passengers and 1,000 tons of freight. Passenger traffic declined for Eva in the 1898 fiscal year, with the boat carrying 2,050 passengers. Freight traffic was up however to 1,500 tons carried.

A few days prior to July 17, 1900, Eva was transporting a circus from Australia. The circus had come up the coast from California by wagon to Gardiner, Oregon. At Gardiner, the circus was loaded onto a scow, and then towed upriver by the steamer Eva. On board the scow were three men, eight horses, four wagons, a tent, and much circus equipment. After a few miles, the scow suddenly sank in 15 ft (4.57 m) of water. The men and five horses survived, but all the rest went down with the scow. Part of the circus property and a span of mules were on board Eva, and these were taken back to Gardiner to regroup.

In the week of June 16, 1903, Eva was hauled out on a mud flat for repairs. During this time, Eva's place on the run up the Umpqua River to Scottsburg was taken by the steamer Juno.

On August 27, 1903, it was reported that a delay in delivery of a cylinder for Eva had required Juno to work double service on the Scottsburg run for the previous two weeks.

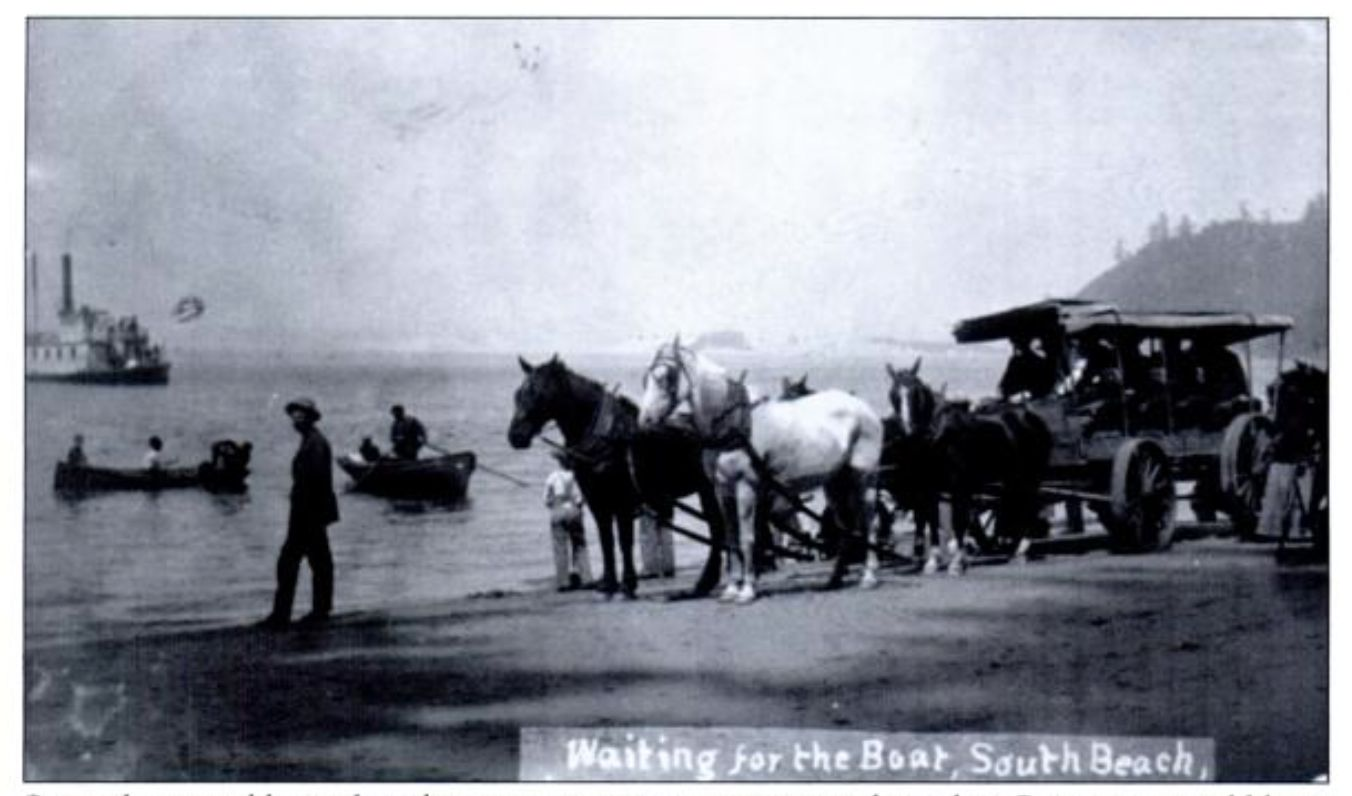
Eva arriving at South Beach. Wide-tired beach wagons are waiting for the steamer.

During the year 1904, Eva carried 5,847 passengers and 2,500 tons of freight.

On April 9, 1908, near Scottsburg, Eva hit a snag and sank. Eva was carrying mail and passengers at the time. The boat was beached. Everyone on board was able to get off. Passengers and mail were transferred to another vessel. Eva was to be raised and then brought to Gardiner for repairs.

A new boiler was installed in Eva on May 29, 1910, and that day Hinsdale was in Gardiner to inspect the boat.

== Dynamite transported as "bacon" ==
Oscar Hinsdale, one of the owners of Eva, also owned a general store, which sold dynamite for stump-blasting purposes. Although regulations forbade the carrying of dynamite on passenger steamers, Hinsdale had boxes of dynamite relabeled "bacon" and shipped them to his store's customers on Eva. An informant alerted authorities to this, and Hinsdale was arrested in November 1909, at which time he "vehemently denied" having anything to do with shipping dynamite on the Eva. Hinsdale however pleaded guilty on October 7, 1910, in United States District Court, and was fined $50. Half of the fine was to go to the informant. This was the first such prosecution on the west coast, and it attracted national attention.

== Grounded at mouth of the Umpqua river ==
On November 15, 1915, it was reported that when Eva was transporting passengers across the Umpqua river, from one beach to another, the boat became caught in the tide near the mouth of the river. The current was running very strongly on the south beach, it picked up Eva, made the boat unmanageable, and carried the vessel across to the north spit, where the boat was grounded at about 4:30 in the afternoon. Eva blew the steam whistle to signal for help, and the crew of the Umpqua River Coast Guard Station responded, taking the passengers off the boat and back to the station.

Eva was on the spit, it was reported, until 7:30 in the evening or until the tide came in sufficiently to float the boat. Once off the spit, it was still not clear whether the boat had been damaged, so a call was made to the Tidley Addeley, a Southern Pacific tugboat, to come downriver from Gardiner to render assistance if needed. There turned out to be no damage to Eva. It was said at the time that it was fortunate that Eva had grounded on the north spit, because otherwise the strong current would have carried the boat across the bar and into the ocean, where she would have wrecked, as she was not built for rough seas.

== Disposition ==
In April 1916, the rail line from Reedsport to Coos Bay was completed. There was no longer any economic demand for the steamboat service that Eva provided. Eva was last reported to have been used for passenger service, a special excursion, on October 10, 1916.

In the week of September 14, 1917, the Umpqua River Steam Navigation Company formally surrendered Eva's license, and sold the boat to the Umpqua Improvement Company, which began the process of dismantling Eva and converting the vessel into a scow.

== See also ==
- Steamboats of the Oregon Coast
