= Pass Creek Bridge =

Covered bridge in Oregon, US

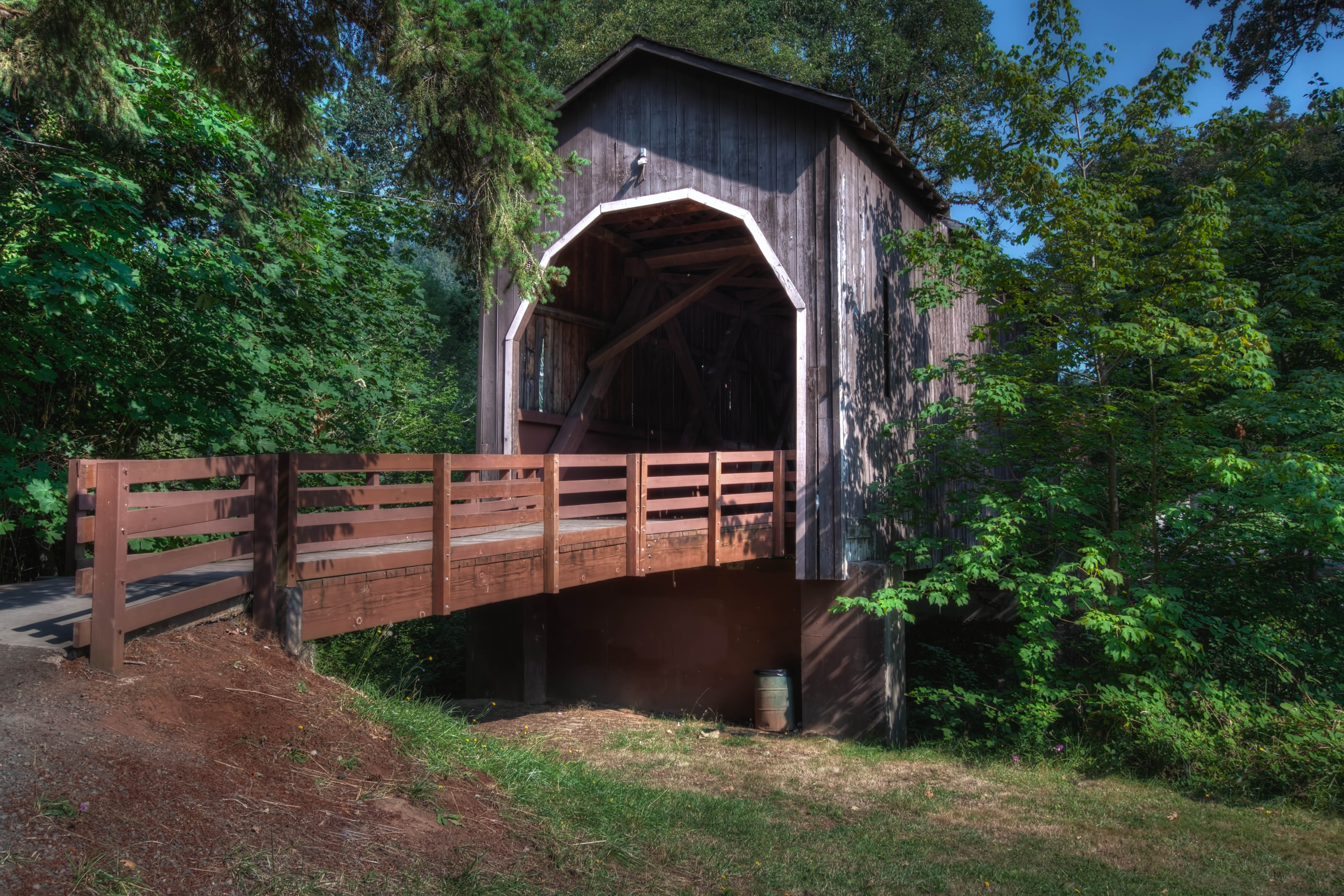
- Pass Creek Covered Bridge in 2012
- Coordinates: 43°39′38.8″N 123°18′59.5″W
- Crosses: Pass Creek
- Locale: Drain, Oregon, United States
- Maintained by: City of Drain

Characteristics
- Design: Howe truss
- Total length: 61 feet (19 m)

History
- Construction end: 1925 (1906); 1987
- Pass Creek Covered Bridge
- U.S. National Register of Historic Places
- NRHP reference No.: 100013522
- Added to NRHP: October 14, 2026

Location
- Interactive map of Pass Creek Bridge

Pass Creek Bridge is a covered bridge in the city of Drain in Douglas County in the U.S. state of Oregon. It originally carried stagecoaches over Pass Creek before being moved a few hundred feet from its original location in 1987 and reassembled behind the Drain Civic Center. From then through 2014, when the city closed the deteriorating bridge completely, it carried pedestrian traffic. Pass Creek is a tributary of Elk Creek in the Umpqua River basin.

Although the official date of construction of the bridge is 1925, members of the Umpqua Historic Preservation Society say the bridge was built in 1906, according to Oregon Department of Transportation. In either case, an even earlier bridge carried a covered wagon route over the creek at this same location. The route, an 1876 extension of the Overland Stagecoach, opened between Roseburg in the interior and Scottsburg near the Oregon Coast. Records from 1895 show a covered railroad bridge next to the covered stagecoach bridge. The rail bridge then carried the Oregon and California Railroad, later acquired by the Southern Pacific.

The 1925 bridge carried First Street over the creek downstream of its 21st-century location behind the civic center. By then, the railroad bridge next to it was a steel truss structure built in 1906. The 1925 Howe truss bridge had few notable architectural details and no windows, although it had cedar siding and some hand-hewn timbers likely recycled from an earlier bridge.

On October 14, 2026, the bridge was added onto the National Register of Historic Places.

== See also ==
- List of Oregon covered bridges
- National Register of Historic Places listings in Douglas County, Oregon
- List of bridges on the National Register of Historic Places in Oregon
