= Jarvis Landing =

Jarvis Landing may refer to:

- Jarvis Landing, California, a suburb of Newark
- Jarvis Landing (Oregon), a former ferry landing on Coos Bay
