= Oregon Route 138 =

State highway in southwestern Oregon, US

Oregon Route 138
- Route 138 highlighted in red

Route information
- Maintained by ODOT
- Length: 140.58 mi (226.24 km)

Major junctions
- West end: OR 38 in Elkton
- I-5 in Sutherlin; OR 99 in Winchester; I-5 in Roseburg; OR 99 in Roseburg; OR 230 near Diamond Lake
- East end: US 97 in Diamond Lake Junction

Location
- Country: United States
- State: Oregon
- Counties: Douglas, Klamath

Highway system
- Oregon Highways; Interstate; US; State; Named; Scenic
← OR 131	→ OR 140

Oregon Route 138 is an Oregon state highway that runs between the city of Elkton and a junction with U.S. Route 97 at Diamond Lake Junction. The highway has several distinct stretches, and is the main east–west highway through Roseburg, and provides access to Crater Lake National Park from the north. The highway is signed east–west.

== Route description ==
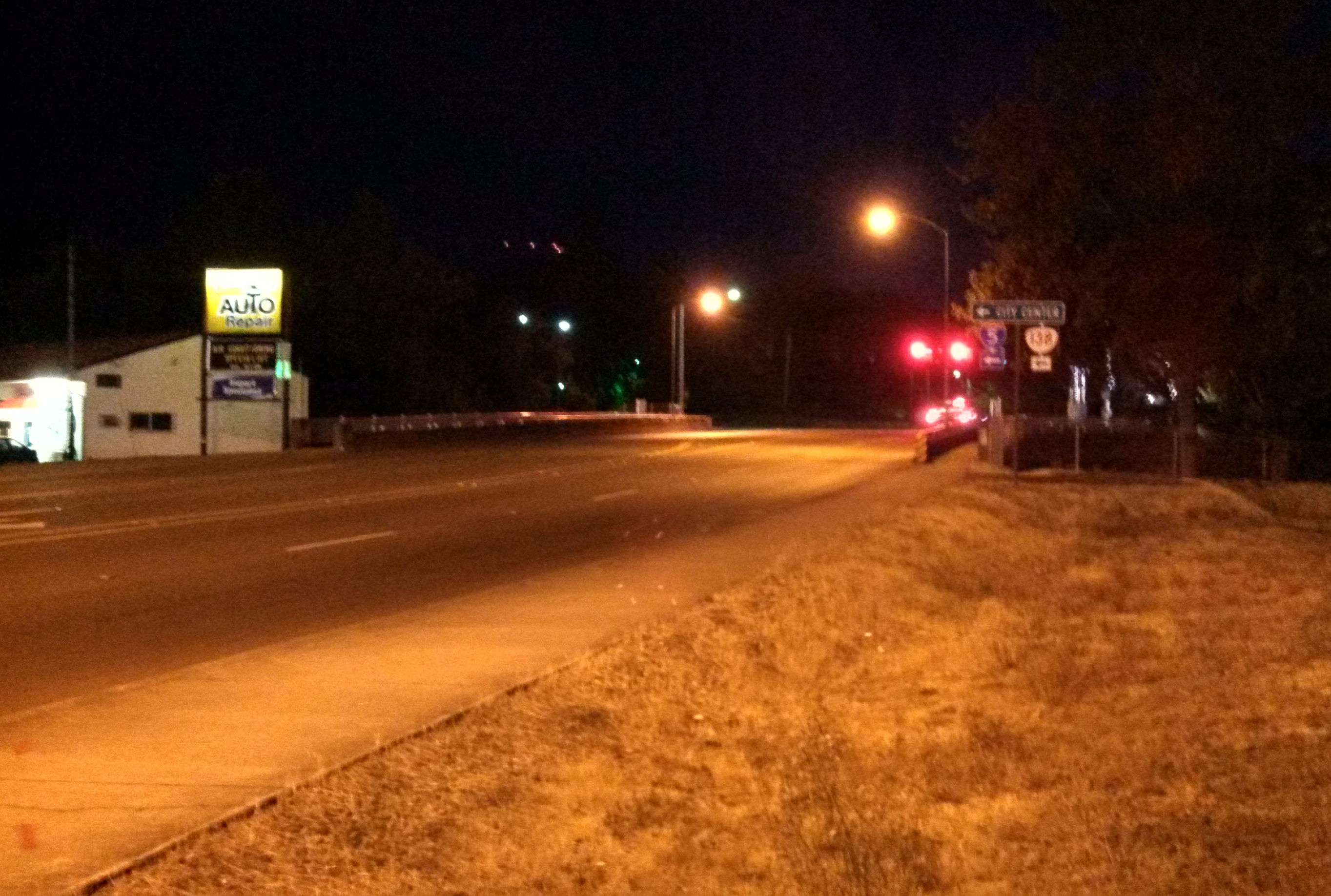
Intersection with Oregon Route 99 in Roseburg

=== Elkton-Sutherlin Highway ===
Oregon Route 138 begins (at its western terminus) at a junction with Oregon Route 38 in Elkton. It heads due south from there, running alongside the Umpqua River. Approximately 15 miles (24 km) south of Elkton, the highway departs from the river, and heads east-southeast until it reaches the city of Sutherlin. This section is the Elkton-Sutherlin Highway No. 231 (see Oregon highways and routes). In Sutherlin, OR 138 intersects with Interstate 5, and joins it, heading south. OR 138 and I-5 remain joined until the city of Roseburg. This section is part of the Pacific Highway No. 1. OR 138 exits from I-5 at Harvard Avenue, and heads east into downtown Roseburg. The downtown Roseburg section comprises part of Harvard, Oak, and Washington Avenues, and then part of the Oakland-Shady Highway, which is no longer a state highway.

=== North Umpqua Highway ===
OR 138 leaves Roseburg on the North Umpqua Highway No. 138 as it follows the Umpqua River's north fork. It heads due east out of Roseburg, ascending into the Cascade mountains, and turning northeast. Eventually, the highway turns south and reaches Diamond Lake, passing by the lake to the east. Just south of there is an intersection with Oregon Route 230, which bypass Crater Lake National Park to the west. South of there lies the north entrance to the park. OR 138 continues east from the entrance, descending into Central Oregon, and terminates at an intersection with U.S. Route 97 at Diamond Lake Junction, south of the town of Chemult.

The portion of the highway between Roseburg and Diamond Lake is part of the Rogue-Umpqua Scenic Byway. The portion between former Route 209 and US 97 is part of the Volcanic Legacy Scenic Byway.

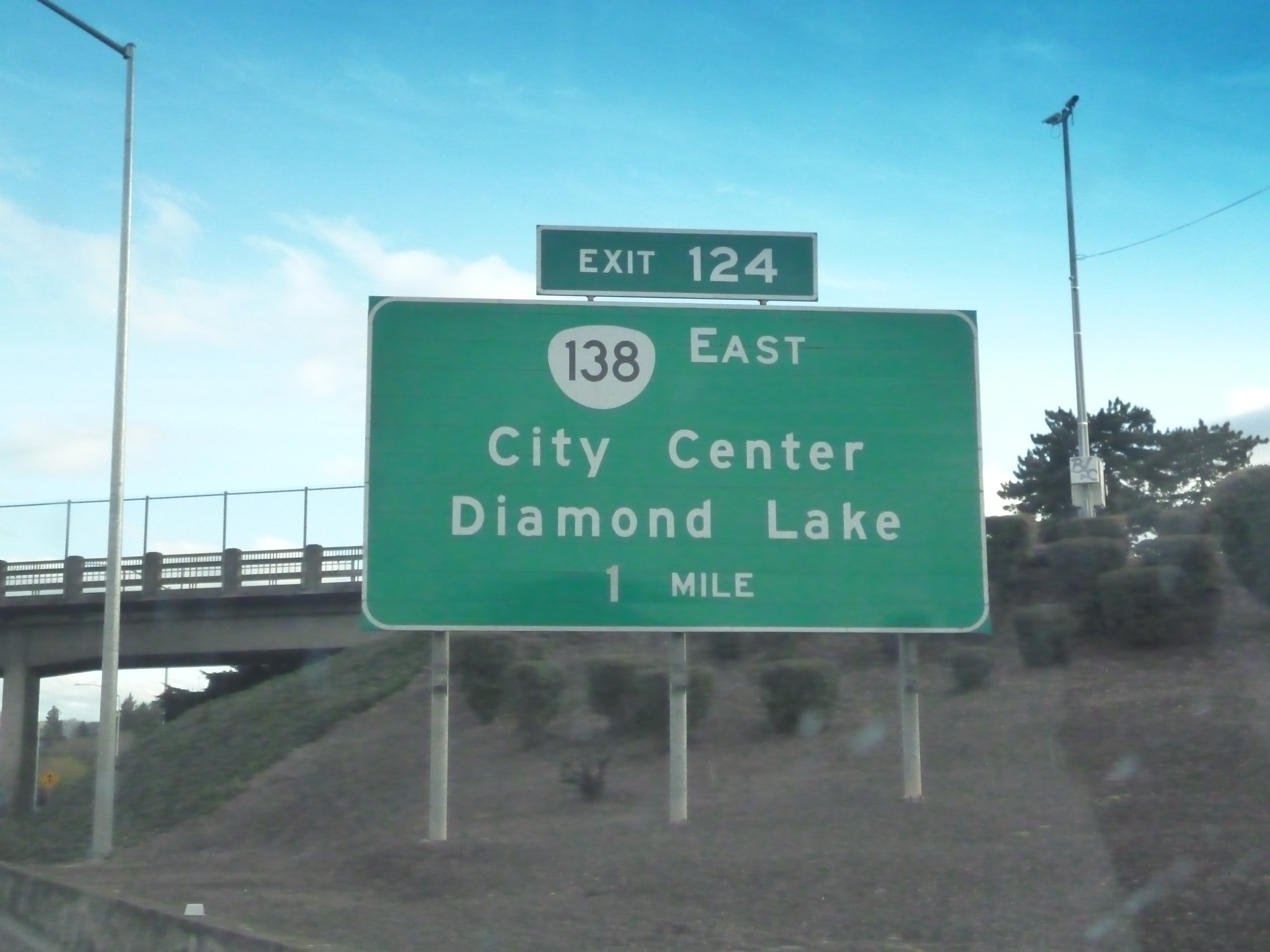
Oregon Route 138 Interstate Sign

== Major intersections ==
County	Location	mi	km	Exit	Destinations	Notes
Douglas	Elkton	0.00	0.00		OR 38 – Drain, Reedsport, Oregon Coast, Eugene	
Douglas	Sutherlin	24.22	38.98	136	I-5 north – Eugene	Northern end of I-5 overlap
Douglas	Sutherlin	25.60	41.20	135	Sutherlin, Wilbur	
Douglas		31.28	50.34	129	Winchester	Northbound signage
Douglas		31.28	50.34	129	Wilbur	Southbound signage
Douglas	Roseburg	34.22	55.07	127	Edenbower Boulevard – North Roseburg	
Douglas	Roseburg	35.66	57.39	125	Garden Valley Boulevard – Roseburg	
Douglas	Roseburg	36.60	58.90	124	I-5 south – Medford	Southern end of I-5 overlap
Douglas	Roseburg	37.12– 37.24	59.74– 59.93		OR 99 south (SE Pine Street) / SE Stephens Street – Winston	Southern end of OR 99 overlap
Douglas	Roseburg	37.48	60.32		OR 99 north (SE Stephens Street) – [[, Oregon|]]	Northern end of OR 99 overlap
Douglas	Diamond Lake	120.50	193.93		OR 230 west – Medford	
Douglas		123.47	198.71		Crater Lake National Park north entrance road	
Klamath		138.24	222.48		US 97 – Chemult, Chiloquin, Klamath Falls, Bend	
1.000 mi = 1.609 km; 1.000 km = 0.621 mi: Concurrency terminus
