= Roaring Camp Bridge =

- Formerly listed on the U.S. National Register of Historic Places
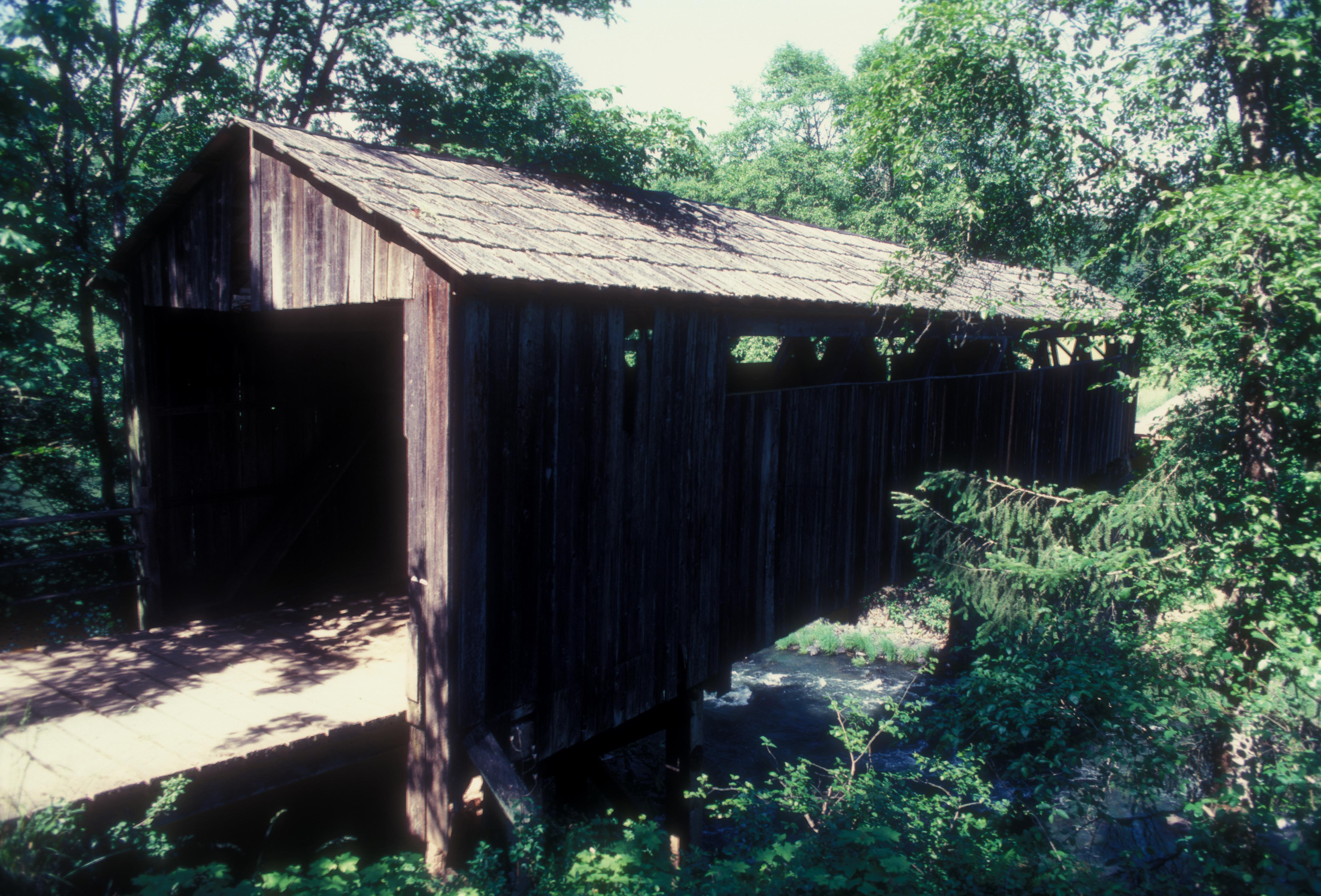
- Roaring Camp Bridge

- Location within Oregon Location within the United States
- Nearest city: Drain
- Coordinates: 43°39′50″N 123°26′23″W
- Built: 1929
- Built by: Robert Lancaster
- Architectural style: Howe truss
- MPS: Oregon Covered Bridges TR
- NRHP reference No.: 79002057

Significant dates
- Listed: November 29, 1979
- Removed from NRHP: after demolition in 1995

Roaring Camp Bridge was a private covered bridge spanning Elk Creek about 6 miles (10 km) west of Drain in the U.S. state of Oregon. Robert Lancaster built the bridge in 1929 to provide road access to his farm, and other local residents used it as well. Roaring Camp was also the name of a roadhouse near the bridge.

Roaring Camp Bridge, clad with unpainted vertical 1-by-6-inch (2.5 by 15.2 cm) boards, had ribbon openings along its side walls. The Howe truss bridge, 88 feet (27 m) long, was demolished in 1995. Added to the National Register of Historic Places in 1979, it was delisted after its demolition.

== See also ==
- List of bridges on the National Register of Historic Places in Oregon
- List of Oregon covered bridges
- National Register of Historic Places listings in Douglas County, Oregon
