= KBDF =

- Diamond Lake, Oregon; United States
- Broadcast area: Southern Oregon
- Frequency: 98.1 MHz

Programming
- Format: Oldies 60s 70s & 80s)

Ownership
- Owner: Oregon North Star Radio Network

History
- First air date: 2012

Technical information
- Licensing authority: FCC
- Facility ID: 189547
- Class: A
- ERP: 6,000 watts
- HAAT: −70 meters (−230 ft)
- Transmitter coordinates: 43°10′52″N 122°08′15″W

Links
- Public license information: Public file; LMS

KBDF (98.1 FM) is an American radio station serving the community of Diamond Lake, Oregon. The station's license to cover was held by Larharpol LLC. The station signed on the air on May 23, 2012 with an oldies format, and received its license to cover on June 13, 2012.

== History ==
After winning a frequency auction in May 2011, Tallie Colville of Valley City, North Dakota, applied to the Federal Communications Commission (FCC) in August 2011 for a construction permit for a new broadcast radio station. The FCC granted this permit on October 5, 2011. The new station was assigned call sign KBDF on October 14, 2011. The permit was assigned to Larharpol LLC on May 3, 2012.

== See also ==
- List of radio stations in Oregon
