= Drain–Coos Bay stage line =

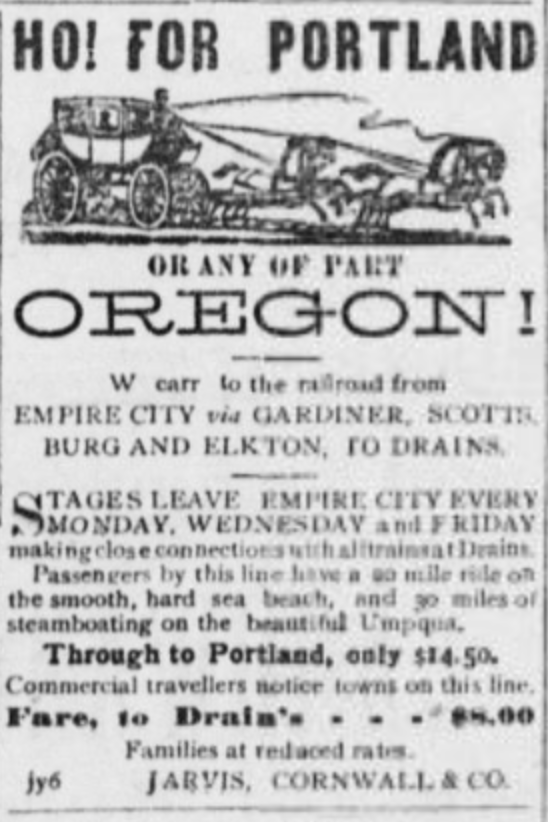
- Advertisement for Drain–Coos Bay stage line, July 24, 1890.

Major junctions
- From: Drain, Oregon
- To: Coos Bay, Oregon

Location
- Country: United States
- State: Oregon

Highway system
- Stagecoach Lines

The Drain–Coos Bay stage line was a stagecoach line that operated an overland and marine transportation line that connected the interior of southern Oregon with Coos Bay from 1876 to 1916.

== Ownership ==
The Drain–Coos Bay Stage Company had been organized by Capt. N. J. Cornwall, W. P. Jewett, and O. B. Hinsdale.

== Route ==
=== Drain to Scottsburg ===
A stage coach road was established In 1876 between Drain and Scottsburg. Horse-drawn coaches were in use on the route as late as February 27, 1907. The stage left Drain, then went along Elk Creek and across Hancock Mountain to Elkton.

At Elkton, there was a stop for a meal, a change of drivers and possibly a new team of horses. The stage then went on into Scottsburg. Although the trip was made in one day, mud during the frequent times of rainy weather made it a difficult one. After Elkton, the route ran along the north side of the Umpqua River to Scottsburg.

Once at Scottsburg, travellers after 1884 could rest at a hotel, the Palmer House, which also served as a depot for the stage.

=== River travel to Gardiner and south beach ===
The Drain–Coos Bay Coach Line ran a free shuttle coach to carry passengers from the hotel to the Scottsburg steamboat landing. Travellers would then board a river steamer which ran downstream, stopping at Gardiner, on the north side of the river, or, for travellers going to Coos Bay, at the beach on the south side of the river, near the present town of Winchester Bay.

=== South Beach to Coos Bay ===
Stages on the south beach

Once at the south beach, travellers disembarked and were picked up by another set of stages. Freight was also transhipped from boat to wagon. Ahead of them was a sandy beach, approximately 20 miles long running south toward Coos Bay. The beach vehicles had purpose-built wide wheels so they would not sink into the sand.

Approximately half-way along the 20 mile route, Tenmile Creek flows into the ocean. High tide at Tenmile Creek could make it impossible to cross.

On October 23, 1907 (or September 20, 1907) just north of Tenmile Creek, the schooner Novelty came ashore. The wreck was largely intact, and this and its location near Tenmile Creek made a popular rest stop along the beach route.

The route then proceeded another 10 miles further south and then cut inland along a boardwalk about one mile long to Jarvis Landing on Coos Bay. Jarvis Landing was across the bay from Empire City on the east side of the north spit at the entrance to the bay. Once at Jarvis Landing, travellers could proceed by water transport to Empire City, by rowboat at first or later by steamboat or gasoline launch, to North Bend or Marshfield.

== Use of automobiles ==
By March 27, 1915, automobiles were being used along the beach route.

== Hazards along the route ==
On December 9, 1907, the stage left Jarvis Landing at about 6:20, and, upon reaching the beach, encountered water covering the beach from inches to three feet deep. A large wave came in, carrying a log with it; the log then struck the coach. A second wave then came, and rolled over the top of the coach, pushing over the coach, and trapping two passengers. They were rescued by other travellers and, although it was a dangerous situation, no one was seriously harmed.

On July 25, 1913, a traveller at Jarvis Landing, Rev. Father Hughes, while transferring from the stage to stage boat, was hurt when he stepped on a rotted plank at the dock at Jarvis Landing. He fell through and, in so doing, struck his face on a protruding spike, suffering a severe gash near his eye.

== Termination of service ==
Stage service on the beach run between Winchester and Jarvis Landing ended in April 1916, when a railroad was completed linking Reedsport and Coos Bay.
