= Elkhead, Oregon =

Unincorporated community in the state of Oregon, United States

- Unincorporated community
- Location within Oregon Location within the United States
- Coordinates: 43°32′26″N 123°11′06″W
- Country: United States
- State: Oregon
- County: Douglas
- Elevation: 804 ft (245 m)
- Time zone: UTC-8 (Pacific (PST))
  - Summer (DST): UTC-7 (PDT)
- Area code: 541
- GNIS feature ID: 1136255

Elkhead is an unincorporated community in Douglas County, in the U.S. state of Oregon. Elkhead, which lies along Elk Creek in the Umpqua River basin, is southeast of Yoncalla.
