= The Drain Enterprise =

Weekly newspaper published in Drain, Oregon from 1922 to 2015

- Type: Weekly newspaper
- Owner(s): Sue Anderson
- Founder(s): W. A. Priaulx
- Founded: 1922
- Language: English
- Ceased publication: 2015
- Country: Drain, Oregon, US
- Circulation: 680
- OCLC number: 37498801

The Drain Enterprise was a weekly newspaper published in Drain, Oregon, United States, from 1922 to 2015.

== History ==
W. A. Priaulx started The Drain Enterprise on May 4, 1922. He sold the paper three years later to H. R. Young. Young published the paper for 20 years until selling it in 1945 to Clifford D. Irwin. In 1950, the Enterprise was purchased by Roy T. Anderson and his son Lowell R. Anderson.

Five years later the Andersons installed a new a British-made cylinder press which could print 5,000 copies per hour. This made the Enterprise the first paper in Oregon to have the British Vertical Press, Holmes and Co., Ltd., England. Along with the paper, the family ran an office supply store and printed books, like "Moving West on the Drain Covered Wagon" by R. R. "Rudy" Roudebaugh.

Roy Anderson died in 1981. Lowell Anderson kept the paper going, even though it was barely profitable. In 1992, Lowell Anderson died of a heart attack. His widow Betty Anderson then became the publisher and their daughter Sue Anderson became editor. In 2007, Betty Anderson died. In 2015, Sue Anderson, who was also the mayor of Drain, grew ill and closed the Enterprise.
