= Divide, Oregon =

- Ghost town
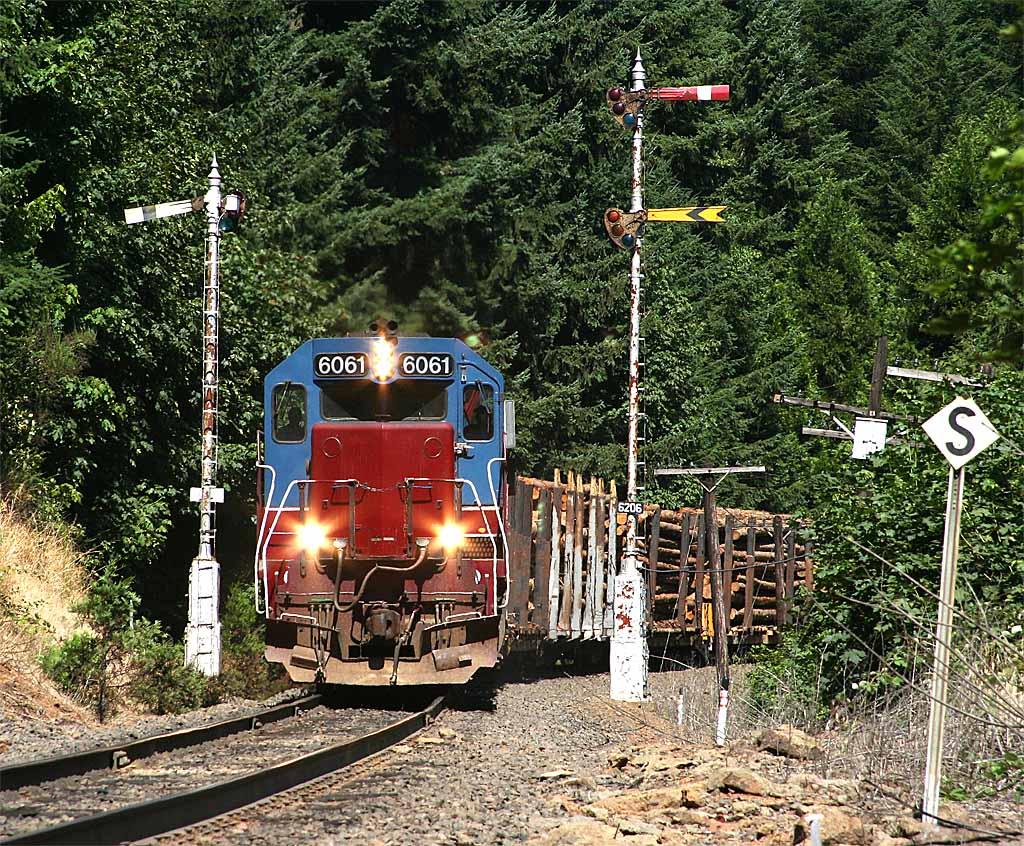
- A train passing by Divide

- Location within Oregon Location within the United States
- Coordinates: 43°45′04″N 123°07′11″W
- Country: United States
- State: Oregon
- County: Lane
- Established: 1900
- Elevation: 745 ft (227 m)
- Time zone: UTC-8 (Pacific (PST))
  - Summer (DST): UTC-7 (PDT)
- Area codes: 458 and 541
- GNIS feature ID: 1119961
- Elevation and coordinates derived from the Geographic Names Information System

Divide is a ghost town in Lane County, Oregon, United States, located southwest of Cottage Grove, near Interstate 5. A post office in Douglas County near a train station on the Southern Pacific Railroad was established on May 31, 1900, and it was closed on January 15, 1921. In 1909, the post office was relisted as a Lane County post office. It may have been moved across county borders, or its county may have changed during a shift in the border between Lane and Douglas counties.

Divide got its name because it is very near the boundary between the Umpqua River watershed on the west and the Willamette River watershed on the east. On the west side, water flows into Pass Creek, and on the east side it flows into the Coast Fork Willamette River. Additionally, the southeast edges of the Siuslaw River watershed are immediately north of Divide.
