= Union Creek Historic District =

Historic district in Oregon, United States

- U.S. National Register of Historic Places
- U.S. Historic district
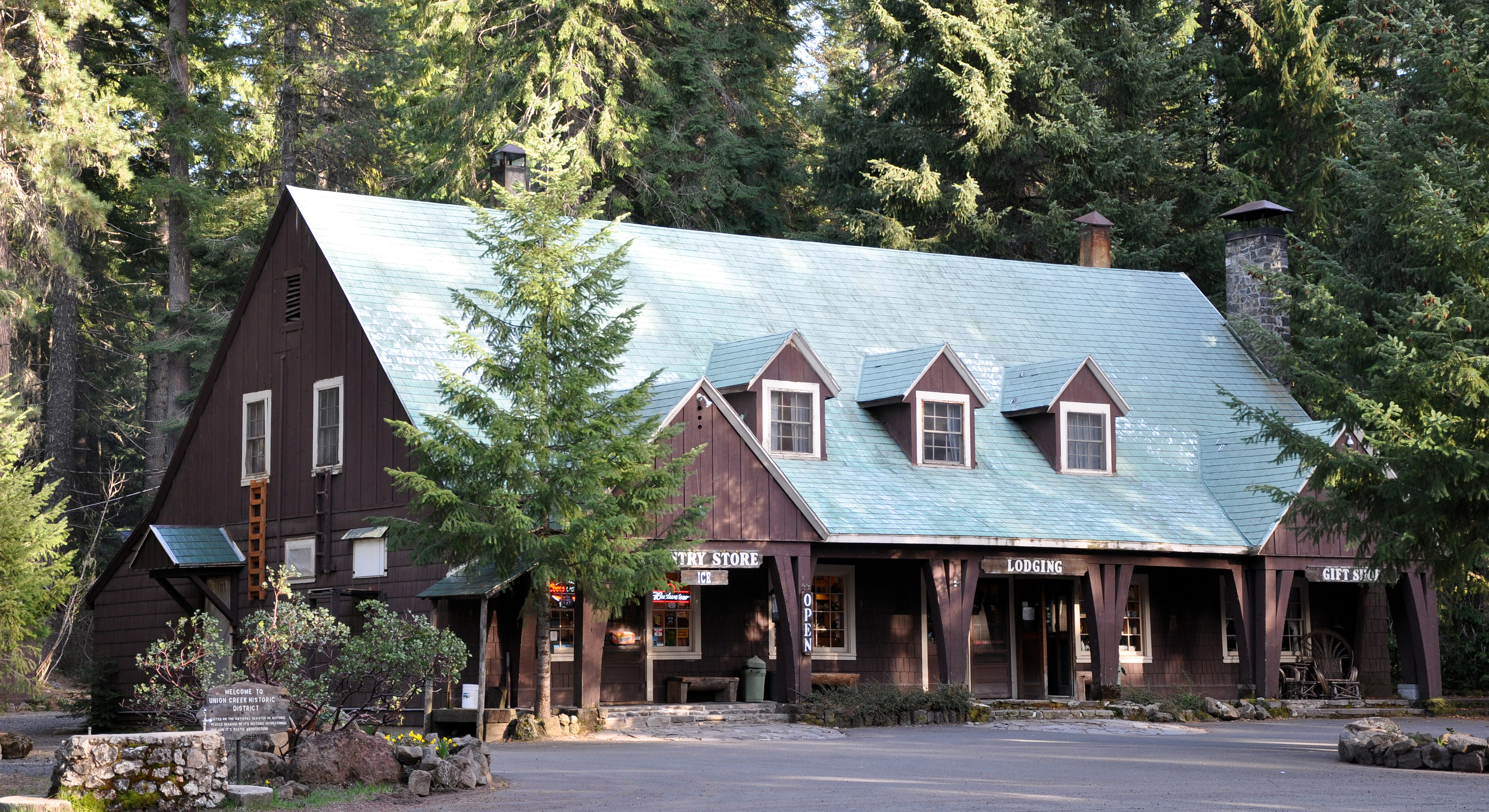
- Union Creek Lodge
- Location: Union Creek, Oregon
- Nearest city: Prospect
- Coordinates: 42°54′25″N 122°26′44″W
- Built: primary 1900; secondary 1942
- NRHP reference No.: 80003328
- Added to NRHP: August 29, 1980

Union Creek Historic District near the upper Rogue River in Union Creek, Oregon, is listed on the U.S. National Register of Historic Places for rustic structures built by the Civilian Conservation Corps (CCC) in the 1930s. The site lies along Oregon Route 62 and the upper Rogue River, about 12 miles (19 km) north of Prospect and about 20 miles (32 km) west of Crater Lake.

Buildings in the district include a CCC picnic shelter and amphitheater, the Union Creek Resort lodge, a grocery store, cabins, restaurant, and an ice cream shop; all retain an early 20th-century appearance. Activities in the area include hiking, fishing, and horseback riding, as well as snow-tubing and sledding in the winter.

According to a short essay included on the back of the menu at Beckie's Cafe, one of the buildings at Union Creek, the site was a popular camping spot in the early 1900s. It lay along the wagon road between the Rogue Valley further downstream and Crater Lake and points east. By the 1920s, the Union Creek Resort, which had a central lodge and guest cabins, had been built on the site. The original lodge burned down in 1937 and was replaced a year later by the one still in use in 2010.

The community took its name from a local stream, Union Creek. The creek was named after Union Peak in Crater Lake National Park.

== Works cited ==
- McArthur, Lewis A., and McArthur, Lewis L. (2003) [1928]. Oregon Geographic Names, 7th ed. Portland: Oregon Historical Society Press. ISBN 0-87595-277-1.
