= Charles and Anna Drain House =

Historic house in Oregon, United States

- Charles D. Drain Jr. House
- U.S. National Register of Historic Places
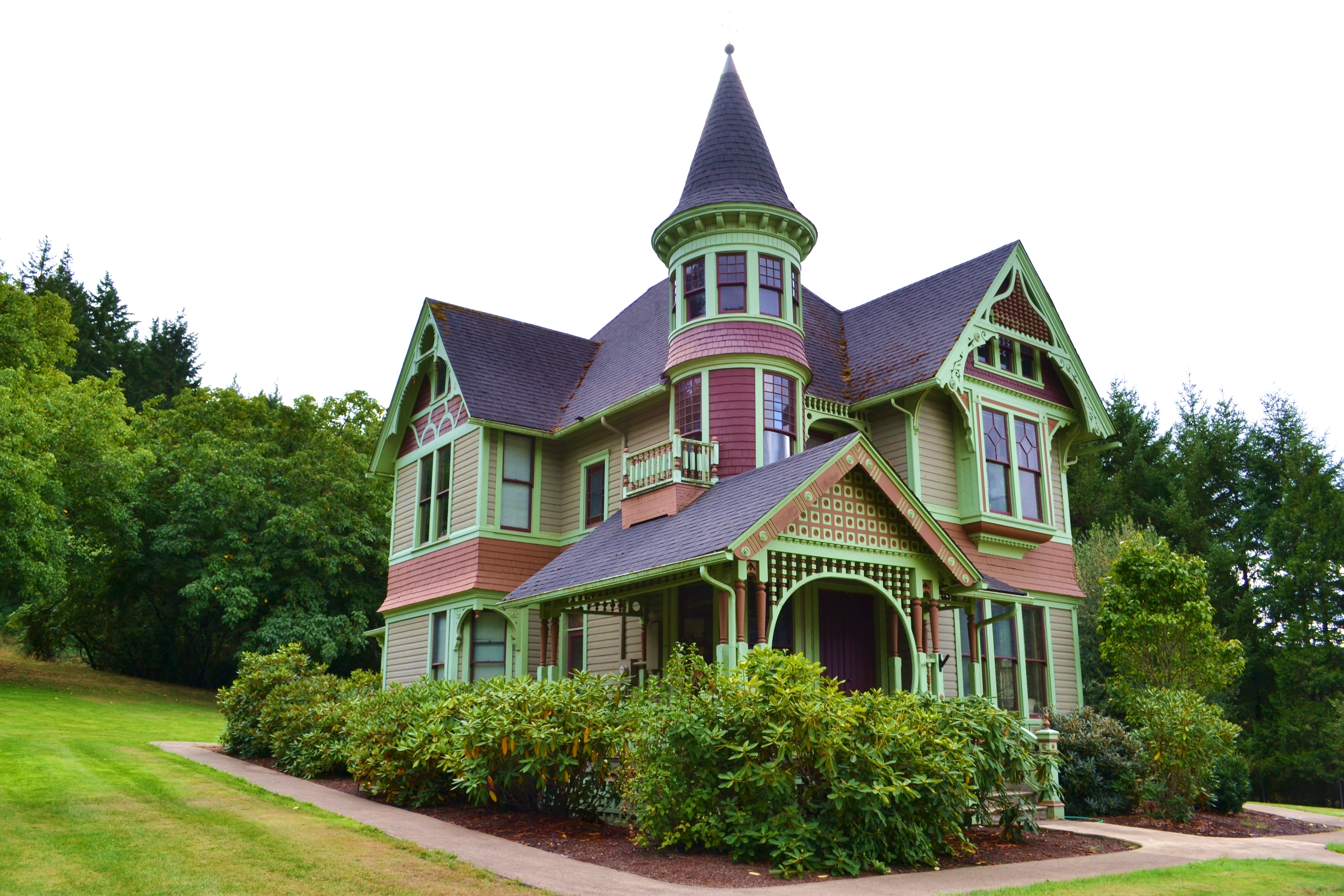
- Viewed from the northeast in 2011

- Location within Oregon
- Location: 500 S. Main St., Drain, Oregon
- Coordinates: 43°39′30.7″N 123°18′43.3″W
- Area: 2.5 acres (1.0 ha)
- Built: 1893
- Architectural style: Queen Anne
- NRHP reference No.: 78002286
- Added to NRHP: December 12, 1978

The Charles D. Drain Jr. House, also known as the Charles and Anna Drain House, in Drain, Oregon, is listed on the National Register of Historic Places. Construction of the house was commissioned by Charles Douglas Drain (b. March 2, 1861, d. March 1, 1910), the youngest son of town founder Charles Drain. Completed in 1895, the house is a prominent example of Queen Anne style architecture in Drain. The owners selected architect George Franklin Barber's Cottage Souvenir No. 2 - design number 37. Currently, the Drain school district headquarters are at the house.

The Charles and Anna Drain House was added to the National Register of Historic Places in 1978.
