= Charles Drain (pioneer) =

American politician

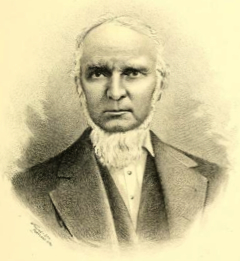
Charles Drain

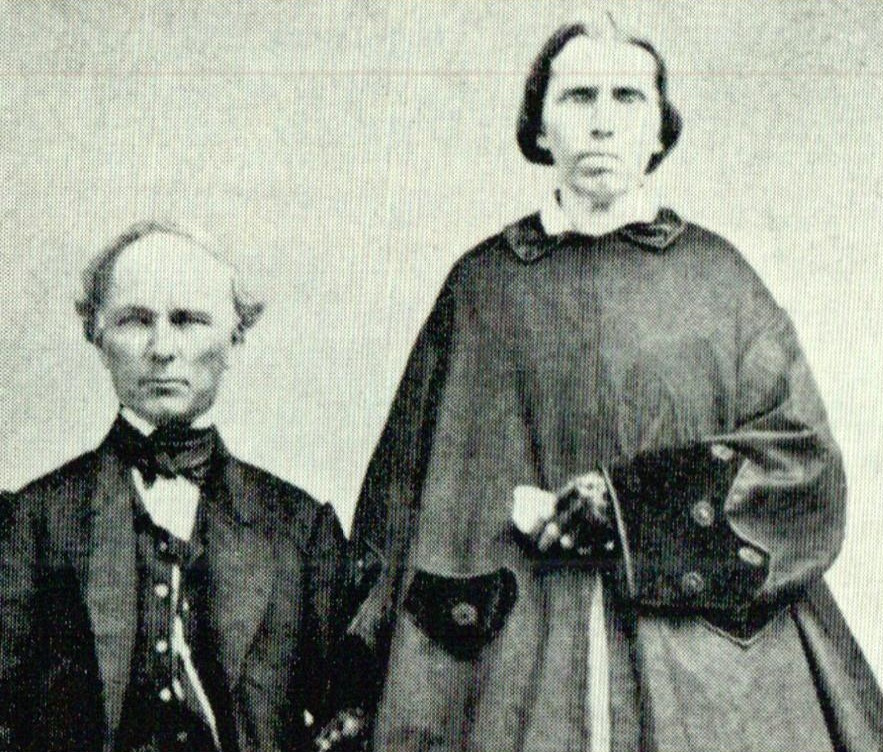
Charles and Nancy Drain

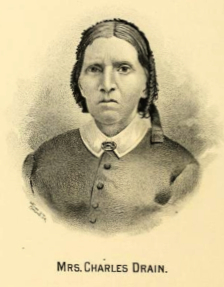
Mrs. Charles Drain

Charles J. Drain (December 28, 1816 – June 24, 1894) was a politician in the Oregon Territory and later the U.S. state of Oregon, and the founder of the city of Drain. He was born in 1816 near Lancaster, Pennsylvania. The family moved to Shelby County, Indiana, when Charles was five. Both parents soon died. He married Nancy Ensley in 1839, and in 1852 the family moved to Marion County, Oregon, and later to Linn County, to farm in the Willamette Valley.

In 1855 Charles Drain was elected to the Oregon Territorial Legislature, and during pre-admission statehood in 1858, Drain was elected to the Oregon State Senate. He also served as President of the Council during the last session of the territorial legislature from 1858 into 1859.

In 1860, Drain moved his family to Douglas County and began to purchase parcels that would become a 2,000-acre (810 ha) farm. He bought 320 acres (130 ha) from Jesse Applegate. At a price of one dollar, in 1872 he sold 60 acres (24 ha) to the Oregon and California Railroad to build the town and depot, which would become the city of Drain.

Charles Drain died in 1894. His three surviving children included John C. Drain, who was the first mayor of Drain and a Speaker of the Oregon House of Representatives; Catherine A. Drain (married Simon R. Lane, son of Joseph Lane); and Charles Douglas Drain, builder of the Charles and Anna Drain House, a prominent Drain landmark.
