= Oregon Route 230 =

State highway in Douglas County, Oregon, US

Oregon Route 230
- West Diamond Lake Highway No. 233
- OR 230 highlighted in red

Route information
- Maintained by ODOT
- Length: 23.80 mi (38.30 km)
- Existed: 1935–present

Major junctions
- South end: OR 62 near Prospect
- North end: OR 138 near Diamond Lake

Location
- Country: United States
- State: Oregon
- County: Douglas

Highway system
- Oregon Highways; Interstate; US; State; Named; Scenic
← OR 229	→ OR 233

Oregon Route 230 is an Oregon state highway which runs along the western edge of Crater Lake National Park, in rural Douglas County, Oregon. It is known as the West Diamond Lake Highway No. 233 (see Oregon highways and routes), and is 24 miles (39 km) long.

== Route description ==
OR 230 begins, at its southern (or "western") terminus, at an intersection with Oregon Route 62 near Union Creek. It heads north, skirting along the western edge of the park. The highway terminates at an intersection with Oregon Route 138 just south of Diamond Lake.

The highway does not provide any access to Crater Lake National Park directly; however, the park can be accessed via either OR 62 (all year) or OR 138 (during the summer, when the North Entrance to the park is open).

== Major intersections ==
County	Location	mi	km	Destinations	Notes
Jackson	Union Creek	0.00	0.00	OR 62 – Crater Lake, Medford, Klamath Falls	
Douglas	Diamond Lake	23.80	38.30	OR 138 – Crater Lake, Roseburg, Bend	
1.000 mi = 1.609 km; 1.000 km = 0.621 mi
