= Elkton, Oregon =

- City
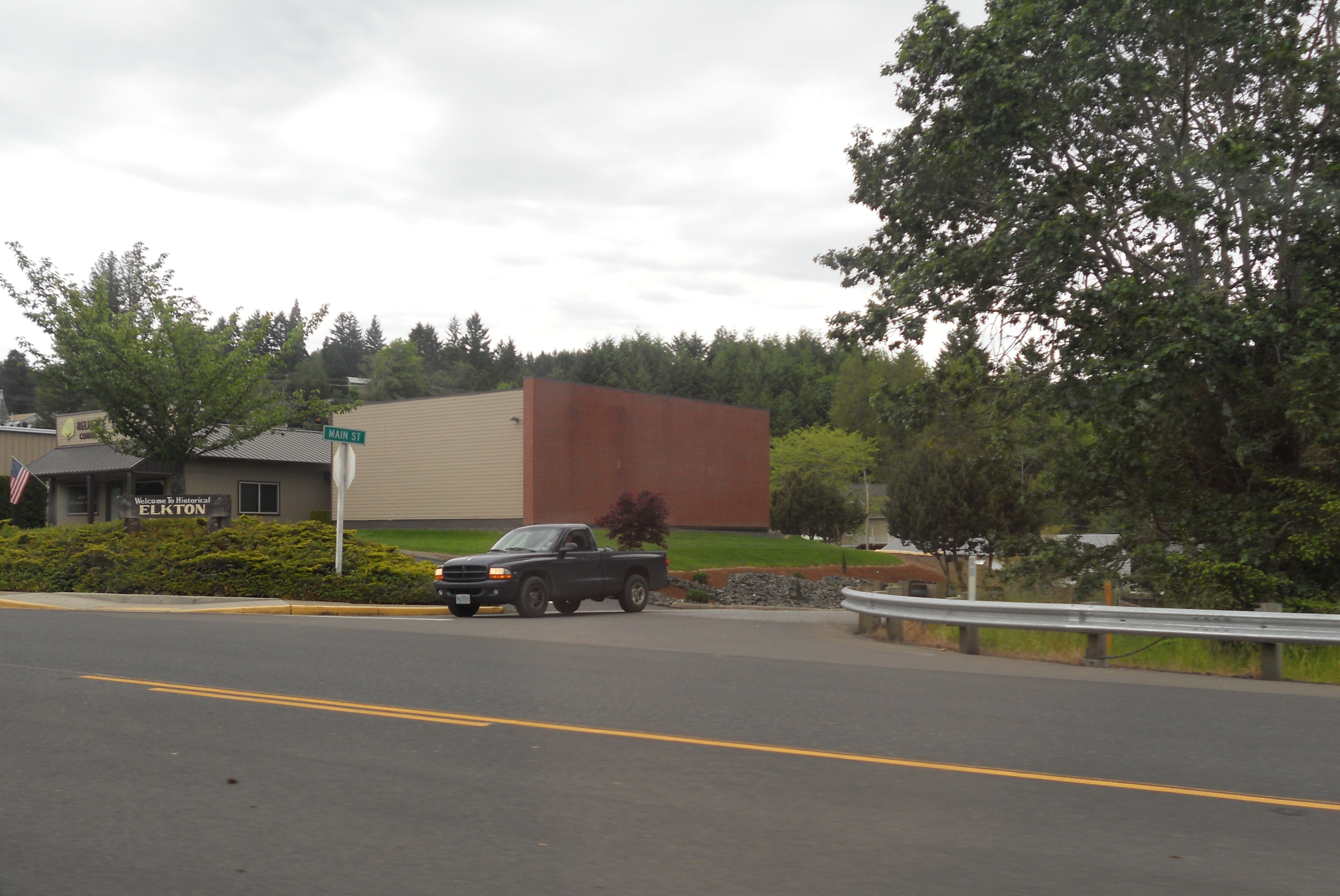
- Nickname: Bass Capitol of Oregon
- Motto: "A Community Invested in its Natural Resources"
- Location in Oregon
- Coordinates: 43°38′16″N 123°34′07″W
- Country: United States
- State: Oregon
- County: Douglas
- Incorporated: 1948

Area
  - Total: 0.26 sq mi (0.67 km^{2})
  - Land: 0.23 sq mi (0.60 km^{2})
  - Water: 0.027 sq mi (0.07 km^{2})
- Elevation: 138 ft (42 m)

Population (2020)
  - Total: 183
  - Density: 789.3/sq mi (304.75/km^{2})
- Time zone: UTC-8 (Pacific)
  - Summer (DST): UTC-7 (Pacific)
- ZIP code: 97436
- Area code: 541
- FIPS code: 41-22800
- GNIS feature ID: 2410429
- Website: www.elkton-oregon.com

Elkton is a city in Douglas County, Oregon, United States. It is located on the lower Umpqua River, at the junction of Oregon Route 38 and Oregon Route 138, about 20 miles (32 km) west of Interstate 5 and about 14 miles (23 km) west of Drain. As of the 2020 census, Elkton had a population of 183.

== History ==
The Klamath Exploring Expedition founded Elkton around Fort Umpqua, at the mouth of Elk Creek on the Umpqua River, in August 1850. A post office was established at Elkton on September 26, 1851. The settlement became an incorporated city on November 4, 1948.

== Geography ==
According to the United States Census Bureau, the city has a total area of 0.26 square miles (0.67 km^{2}), of which, 0.23 square miles (0.60 km^{2}) is land and 0.03 square miles (0.08 km^{2}) is water. The elevation is 141 feet (43 m).

=== Climate ===
This region experiences warm (but not hot) and dry summers, with no average monthly temperatures above 71.6 °F or 22 °C. According to the Köppen Climate Classification system, Elkton has a warm-summer Mediterranean climate, abbreviated Csb on climate maps.

Climate data for Elkton
Month	Jan	Feb	Mar	Apr	May	Jun	Jul	Aug	Sep	Oct	Nov	Dec	Year
Record high °F (°C)	70 (21)	76 (24)	81 (27)	93 (34)	102 (39)	105 (41)	108 (42)	107 (42)	103 (39)	96 (36)	79 (26)	73 (23)	108 (42)
Mean daily maximum °F (°C)	48.8 (9.3)	54 (12)	58.7 (14.8)	63.9 (17.7)	70.6 (21.4)	76.2 (24.6)	84 (29)	84 (29)	79.5 (26.4)	67.1 (19.5)	54.4 (12.4)	48.9 (9.4)	65.8 (18.8)
Mean daily minimum °F (°C)	35.9 (2.2)	37.7 (3.2)	38.8 (3.8)	40.8 (4.9)	44.7 (7.1)	48.7 (9.3)	51.4 (10.8)	51.2 (10.7)	48.1 (8.9)	44.8 (7.1)	40.8 (4.9)	37.3 (2.9)	43.3 (6.3)
Record low °F (°C)	5 (−15)	4 (−16)	24 (−4)	27 (−3)	27 (−3)	23 (−5)	38 (3)	39 (4)	30 (−1)	25 (−4)	16 (−9)	0 (−18)	0 (−18)
Average precipitation inches (mm)	8.53 (217)	6.73 (171)	5.85 (149)	3.57 (91)	2.25 (57)	1.17 (30)	0.29 (7.4)	0.52 (13)	1.28 (33)	3.78 (96)	8.28 (210)	9.82 (249)	52.08 (1,323)
Average snowfall inches (cm)	2.1 (5.3)	0.3 (0.76)	0.4 (1.0)	0 (0)	0 (0)	0 (0)	0 (0)	0 (0)	0 (0)	0 (0)	0.2 (0.51)	0.3 (0.76)	3.3 (8.4)
Average precipitation days	20	17	18	14	10	7	2	3	5	11	17	19	143

== Demographics ==
Historical population
Census	Pop.	Note	%±
1950	201		—
1960	146		−27.4%
1970	176		20.5%
1980	155		−11.9%
1990	172		11.0%
2000	149		−13.4%
2010	195		30.9%
2020	183		−6.2%
U.S. Decennial Census

=== 2020 census ===
As of the 2020 census, Elkton had a population of 183 and a median age of 48.6 years. 16.9% of residents were under the age of 18 and 31.7% of residents were 65 years of age or older. For every 100 females there were 88.7 males, and for every 100 females age 18 and over there were 87.7 males age 18 and over.

0% of residents lived in urban areas, while 100.0% lived in rural areas.

There were 95 households in Elkton, of which 33.7% had children under the age of 18 living in them. Of all households, 45.3% were married-couple households, 21.1% were households with a male householder and no spouse or partner present, and 28.4% were households with a female householder and no spouse or partner present. About 32.6% of all households were made up of individuals and 17.9% had someone living alone who was 65 years of age or older.

There were 107 housing units, of which 11.2% were vacant. Among occupied housing units, 74.7% were owner-occupied and 25.3% were renter-occupied. The homeowner vacancy rate was <0.1% and the rental vacancy rate was <0.1%.

Racial composition as of the 2020 census
Race	Number	Percent
White	150	82.0%
Black or African American	0	0%
American Indian and Alaska Native	2	1.1%
Asian	4	2.2%
Native Hawaiian and Other Pacific Islander	1	0.5%
Some other race	3	1.6%
Two or more races	23	12.6%
Hispanic or Latino (of any race)	14	7.7%

=== 2010 census ===
As of the 2010 census, there were 195 people, 85 households, and 58 families residing in the city. The population density was about 848 inhabitants per square mile (327.4/km^{2}). There were 110 housing units at an average density of about 478 per square mile (184.6/km^{2}). The racial makeup of the city was 92.3% White, 1% Native American, 2.1% from other races, and 4.6% from two or more races. Hispanic or Latino of any race were 8.7% of the population.

There were 85 households, of which about 24% had children under the age of 18 living with them, 53% were married couples living together, 12% had a female householder with no husband present, 3.5% had a male householder with no wife present, and about 32% were non-families. About 27% of all households were made up of individuals, and 15% had someone living alone who was 65 years of age or older. The average household size was 2.29 and the average family size was 2.78.

The median age in the city was about 52 years. About 22% of residents were under the age of 18; 1% were between the ages of 18 and 24; 19% were from 25 to 44; 30% were from 45 to 64; and 27% were 65 years of age or older. The gender makeup of the city was about 48% male and 52% female.
