= Jarvis Landing (Oregon) =

Landing place in Coos Bay, Oregon, U.S.

Coordinates: 43.398789°N 124.286615°W

Jarvis Landing was a landing place on the north side of the entrance to Coos Bay in Oregon, United States.

== Description ==
Jarvis Landing was on the east side of the north spit at the entrance to Coos Bay.

Jarvis Landing was named after Fred Jarvis, who in the 1880s took over the stage line running along the beach from Coos Bay north to the mouth of the Umpqua River. Jarvis established what is known as the Jarvis Landing Beach Road on the spit.

Travelers who arrived at Jarvis Landing from the beach stage could proceed by water transport, rowboats and first, to Empire City or later, by steamboat or gasoline launch, to North Bend or Marshfield.
