= Union Creek (South Dakota) =

Stream in South Dakota, U.S.

Coordinates: 42°50′08″N 96°34′58″W

Union Creek is a stream in the U.S. state of South Dakota.

Union Creek takes its name from Union County.

== See also ==
- List of rivers of South Dakota
