= Elk Creek (Umpqua River tributary) =

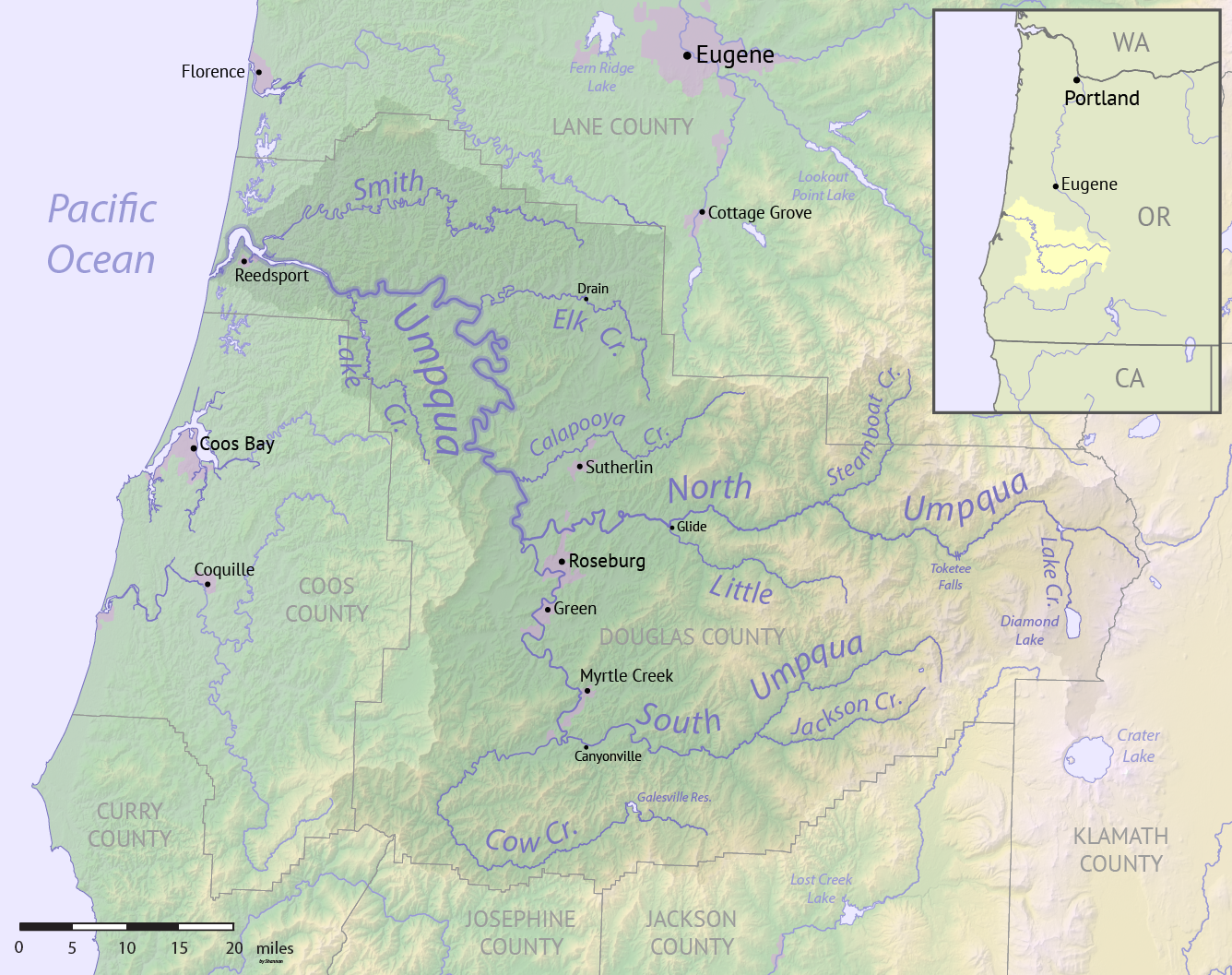
- Map of the Umpqua River watershed

- Location of the mouth of Elk Creek in Oregon

Location
- Country: United States
- State: Oregon
- County: Douglas

Physical characteristics
- Source: Ben More Mountain
  - location: near Elkhead, lower Cascade Range
  - coordinates: 43°30′00″N 123°09′37″W
  - elevation: 1,245 ft (379 m)
- Mouth: Umpqua River
  - location: Elkton
  - coordinates: 43°38′01″N 123°34′02″W
  - elevation: 82 ft (25 m)
- Length: 46 mi (74 km)
- Basin size: 290 sq mi (750 km^{2})

Elk Creek is a tributary, about 46 miles (74 km) long, of the Umpqua River in the U.S. state of Oregon. The creek begins near Ben More Mountain in the lower Cascade Range south of Elkhead and flows generally north until passing under Interstate 5 in Scotts Valley. It then turns sharply west, flowing through the small city of Drain before meeting the Umpqua at Elkton. Oregon Route 99 runs along the creek for a short distance south of Drain, and Oregon Route 38 follows the creek from Drain to Elkton.

Before its demolition in 1995, Roaring Camp Bridge, a private covered bridge, spanned Elk Creek about 6 miles (10 km) west of Drain. Robert Lancaster built the bridge in 1929 to provide road access to his farm. Added to the National Register of Historic Places in 1979, the bridge was delisted after its destruction in 1995.

== Tributaries ==
Named tributaries of Elk Creek from source to mouth are Shingle Mill, Walker, Adams, Bennet, Cox, Salt, and Wehmeyer creeks followed by Dodge Canyon. Then come Asker, McClintock, Wise, Yoncalla, Pass, Post, and Billy creeks. Further downstream are Hardscrabble, Jack, Parker, Lancaster, Indian, and Brush creeks. Entering the lower reaches are Big Tom Folley, Hancock, and Little Tom Folley creeks.

== See also ==
- List of rivers of Oregon
