= Jarvis Landing, California =

Former unincorporated community in California, U.S.

Coordinates: 37°31′46″N 122°03′49″W

Jarvis Landing (formerly, Mayhews Landing) is a former unincorporated community, now annexed to Newark in Alameda County, California. It lies at an elevation of 10 feet (3 m).
