= Diamond Lake (Oregon) =

Lake in Douglas County, Oregon, United States

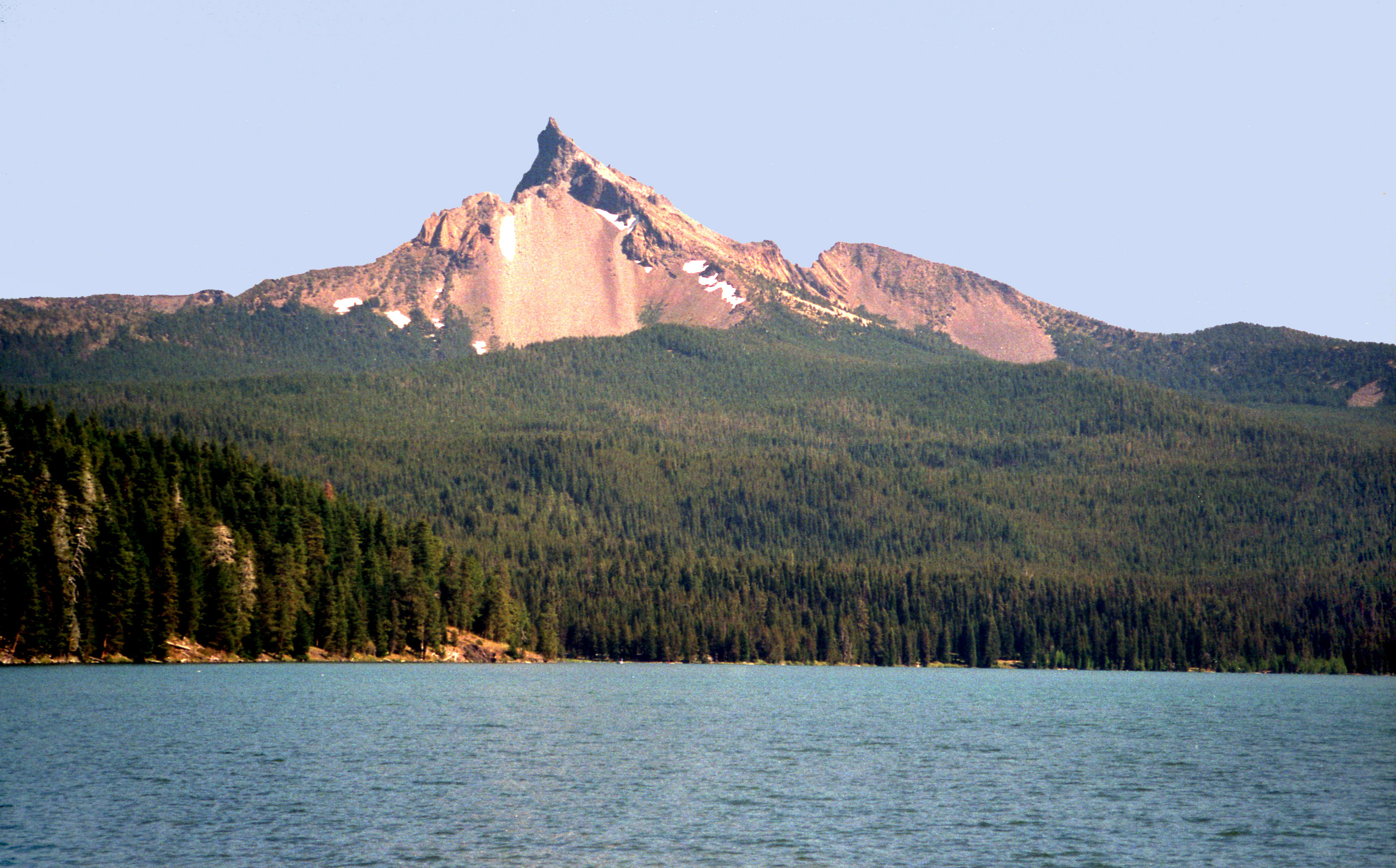
- Lake with Mount Thielsen in the background

- Location within Oregon Location within the United States
- Location: Douglas County, Oregon
- Coordinates: 43°09′31″N 122°09′03″W
- Type: natural, eutrophic
- Primary inflows: Silent Creek
- Primary outflows: Diamond Lake Creek
- Catchment area: 55 square miles (140 km^{2})
- Basin countries: United States
- Max. length: 3.5 mi (5.6 km)
- Max. width: 1.5 mi (2.4 km)
- Surface area: 3,040 acres (12.3 km^{2})
- Average depth: 24 ft (7.3 m)
- Max. depth: 52.5 ft (16.0 m)
- Water volume: 77,100 acre-feet (95,100,000 m^{3})
- Residence time: 1.6 years
- Shore length^{1}: 11 mi (18 km)
- Surface elevation: 5,183 ft (1,580 m)
- ^{1} Shore length is not a well-defined measure.

Diamond Lake is a natural body of water in the southern part of the U.S. state of Oregon. It lies near the junction of Oregon Route 138 and Oregon Route 230 in the Umpqua National Forest in Douglas County. It is located between Mount Bailey to the west and Mount Thielsen to the east; it is just north of Crater Lake National Park.

The outlet of the lake is at its north end. From there, water flows via Diamond Lake Creek into the North Umpqua River and ultimately to the Pacific Ocean.

Diamond Lake was named for John Diamond, for whom Diamond Peak is also named. He saw the lake in 1852 while on the summit of Diamond Peak. Diamond was a pioneer settler of Coburg, Oregon, and part of a party opening a road between the Middle Fork Willamette River and Idaho as an immigration route.

An adjacent post office named Diamond Lake, Oregon, was established in 1925 and ran until 1956, when it was changed to a summer-only office.

Diamond Lake is also the host for the Tour de Diamond, a cycling event that happens every summer. It is the biggest event in the North American Cycling Organization calendar.

== Fish ==
Although rainbow trout are not native to Diamond Lake because the lake lacks the required spawning habitat, large populations of aquatic insects make it ideal for fish. After treating the lake to remove rough fish in 1954, the Oregon Department of Fish and Wildlife (ODFW) stocked the lake with a Canadian strain of rainbow trout and later added local strains in about 1970. Stocked trout grew rapidly in the lake, and before other species began competing successfully with trout, anglers caught 10-pound (4.5 kg) rainbows regularly, and the average catch weighed more than 1 pound (0.45 kg). However, in 1992 a non-native species, tui chub, was detected in the lake. These fish, illegally introduced to the lake, quickly multiplied and negatively affected the sport fishery. The water became murky, the insect population dropped dramatically, and the trout population declined.

To eliminate the unwanted fish, the ODFW poisoned Diamond Lake with rotenone in 2006. This killed 95 million tui chub, and the lake became free of them. By 2007 dramatic improvements were noted in water clarity, insect populations, and the trout catch. The ODFW has captured golden shiners, another invasive species of bait fish illegally introduced to the lake. Although shiners are less successful than tui chubs at multiplying in Diamond Lake, the ODFW works to remove them and to discourage more from being added.

In January 2016, Oregon revealed their plan to release up to 25,000 fish-eating tiger trout into the lake after the appearance of a single tui chub in an effort to prevent it from, once again, harming the lake. The tui chub found in October was 4 years old which means that it was not there for the 2006 elimination. Scientist are unsure of the origins of the single tui chub.

Brown trout were also stocked into Diamond Lake beginning in 2018 to help increase predation on invasive tui chub and golden shiners. While anglers are permitted to harvest rainbow trout from the lake, retention of tiger trout and brown trout is strictly prohibited as of 2025.

== Recreation ==
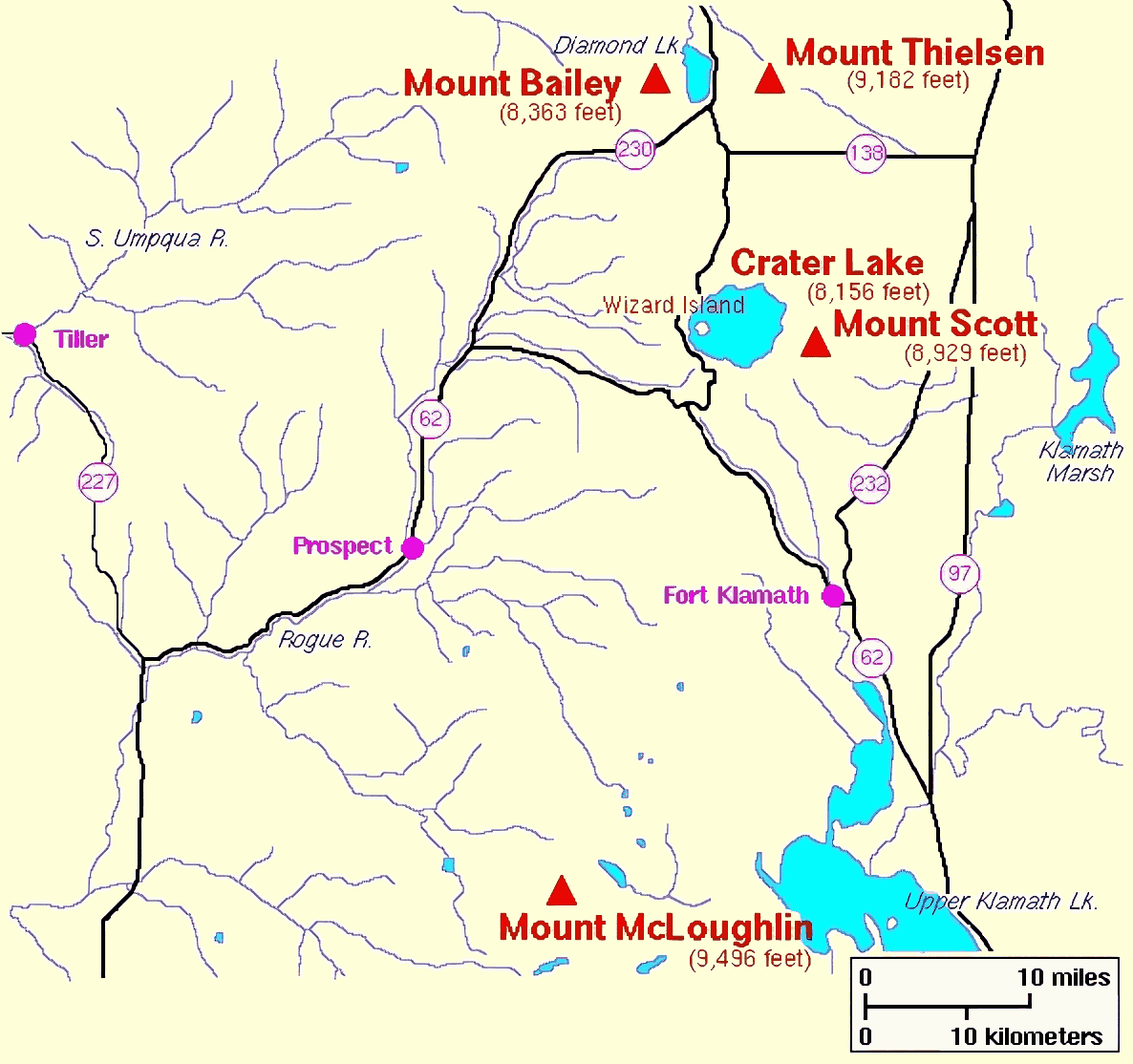
Map of region surrounding Diamond Lake

Anglers often fish by boat near Silent Creek on the south and in deep water on the north. There are five boat ramps around the lake, all of which have paved access. The speed limit on the lake is 10 miles per hour (16 km/h). Bank fishing is productive at points along the lake trails, near Diamond Lake Resort, near Lake Creek, and near the United States Forest Service campgrounds. The lake is generally open for fishing from late April through late October.

Trails connect Diamond Lake to the summits of Mount Bailey and Mount Thielsen, and the Pacific Crest Trail and Crater Lake are also nearby. One of the lake trails is a partially paved bike path 11 miles (18 km) long. Wildlife viewing and birdwatching in the area are common activities. The Joseph H. Stewart State Recreation Area is the closest state park to Diamond Lake.

The Forest Service operates four campgrounds near Diamond Lake. They are Diamond Lake Campground, with 240 campsites along the east side of the lake; Broken Arrow Campground, with 148 sites at the lake's south end; Thielsen View Campground, with 58 sites along the west shore, and the South Shore Area, with five sites. Campground features include picnic tables, restrooms, showers, and garbage bins; some have hookups for recreational vehicles. The South Shore Picnic Area has a playground, volleyball court, horseshoe pits, and a swimming beach, in addition to picnic accommodations.

Swimming, horseback riding, and hunting are popular at Diamond Lake in summer and fall. Winter sports include snowmobiling, Nordic and Alpine skiing, inner tubing and sled dog racing. Diamond Lake Resort on the east side of the lake offers lodging, restaurants, stores, boat rentals, horse rentals, and other services.

== In popular culture ==
The lake is central to the plot of Grimm, season 5 episode 8, which features a fictitious 'Diamond Lake Monster'.

== See also ==
- List of lakes in Oregon
