= Union Creek, Oregon =

Unincorporated community in the state of Oregon, United States

- Unincorporated community
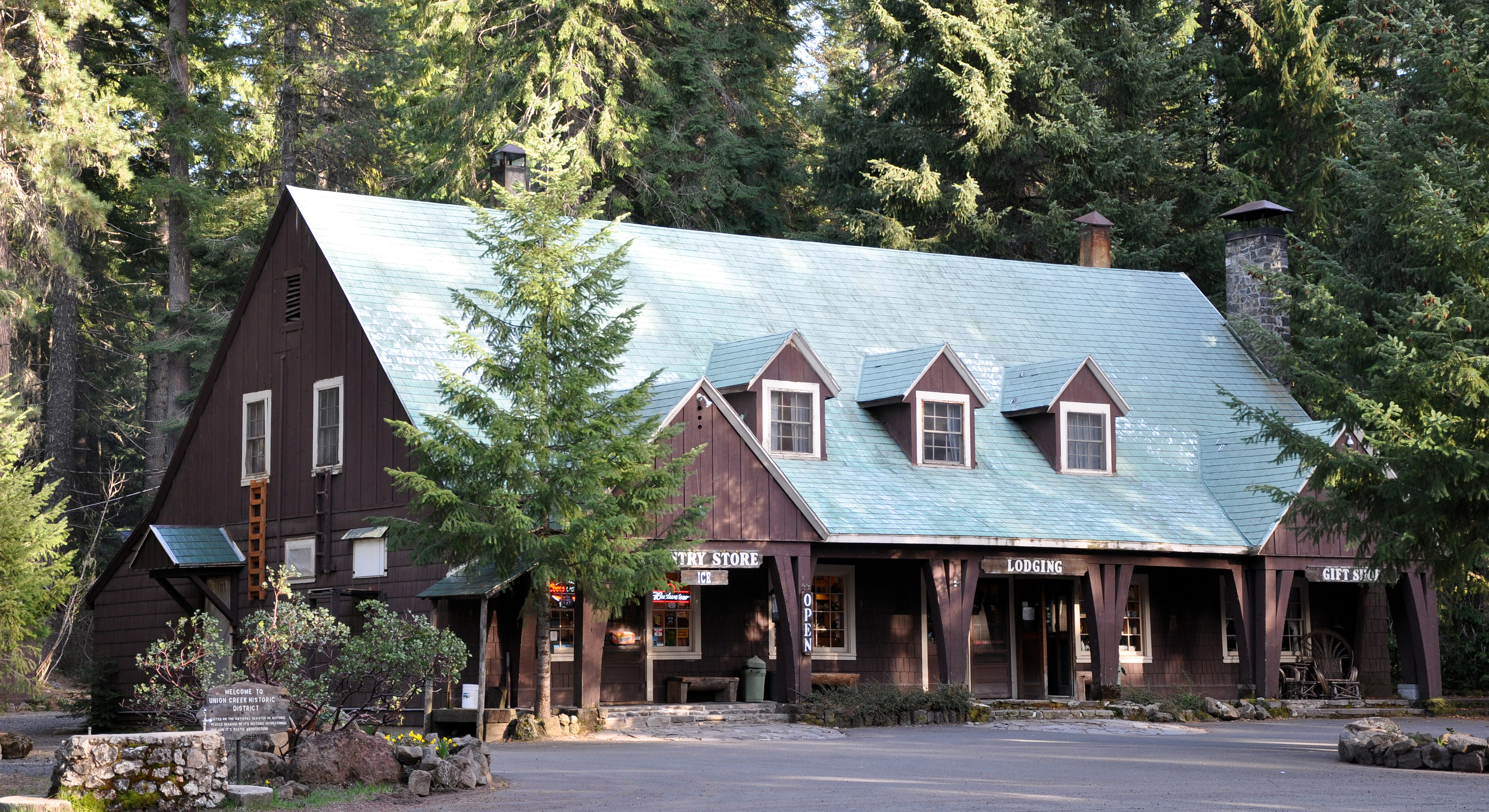
- Union Creek Lodge

- Location within Oregon Location within the United States
- Coordinates: 42°54′25″N 122°26′44″W
- Country: United States
- State: Oregon
- County: Jackson
- Elevation: 3,323 ft (1,013 m)
- Time zone: UTC-8 (Pacific (PST))
  - Summer (DST): UTC-7 (PDT)
- ZIP codes: 97536
- Area code: 541
- GNIS feature ID: 1151648

Union Creek is an unincorporated community in Jackson County in the U.S. state of Oregon. It is located along Union Creek and Oregon Route 62 (Crater Lake Highway), about 15 miles (24 km) from Crater Lake National Park. The community is home to the Union Creek Historic District, which has been listed on the National Register of Historic Places since 1980.

The community is named after the creek, which in turn took its name from Union Peak in the national park. A Union Creek post office was established in 1924 and ceased operations in 1942, although it did not formally close until 1945. Helen C. Herriott was the first postmaster.
