= Scottsburg, Oregon =

Unincorporated community in the state of Oregon, United States

- Unincorporated community
- Location within Oregon Location within the United States
- Coordinates: 43°39′15″N 123°48′56″W
- Country: United States
- State: Oregon
- County: Douglas County
- Elevation: 62 ft (19 m)
- Time zone: UTC-8 (PST)
  - Summer (DST): UTC-7 (PDT)
- ZIP code: 97473
- Area code: 541
- FIPS code: 41-65750
- GNIS feature ID: 1149180

Scottsburg is an unincorporated community in Douglas County, Oregon, United States. It is along the Umpqua River and Oregon Route 38, and is about 20 miles (32 km) from the Pacific Ocean. It was once a growing town but after the Great Flood of 1862 the town declined. Scottsburg was named for pioneer Levi Scott.

The city is located at what was the headwaters of navigation on the Umpqua River, some 20 miles (32 km) from the ocean. For a short time in the 1850s and 1860s, it was a seaport servicing the interior of Southern Oregon.

Scottsburg was a transfer point for a stage line that ran from Drain, Oregon to Scottsburg. Once at Scottsburg, travelers boarded a steamboat and travelled down river to Gardiner, Oregon.

== Notable people ==
- Janet J. McCoy, High Commissioner of the Trust Territory of the Pacific Islands.
