= Oregon Route 38 =

State highway in Douglas County, Oregon, US

Oregon Route 38
- Route 38 highlighted in red

Route information
- Maintained by ODOT
- Length: 57.09 mi (91.88 km)
- Existed: 1932–present

Major junctions
- West end: US 101 in Reedsport
- OR 138 in Elkton; OR 99 in Drain
- East end: I-5 in Anlauf

Location
- Country: United States
- State: Oregon
- County: Douglas

Highway system
- Oregon Highways; Interstate; US; State; Named; Scenic
← OR 37	→ OR 39

Oregon Route 38 is an Oregon state highway that runs between the city of Reedsport, on the Oregon Coast, and an interchange with Interstate 5 near the communities of Curtin and Anlauf. It is also known as most of the Umpqua Highway No. 45 (see Oregon highways and routes), as the western portions of the highway run alongside the Umpqua River. The highway lies entirely within Douglas County.

== Route description ==
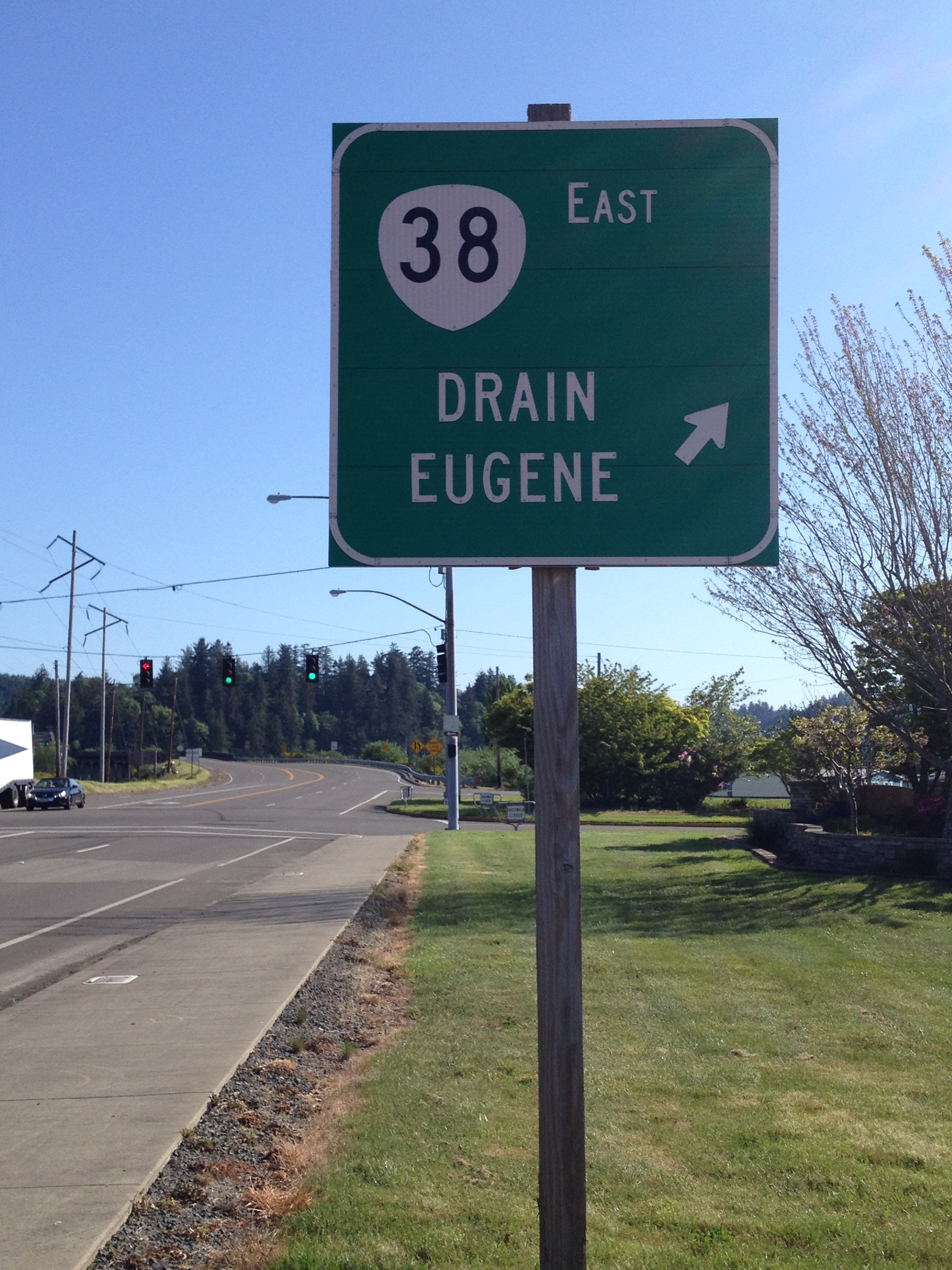
Start of Oregon Route 38 at Reedsport.

Oregon Route 38 begins (at its western terminus) at a junction with U.S. Route 101 in Reedsport. It heads due east from there, running alongside the Umpqua River and by the Dean Creek Wildlife Area, which provides overlooks for viewing regional wildlife. The route continues east after that, passing through the communities of Scottsburg and Green Acres.

In the city of Elkton, the highway intersects with Oregon Route 138, which continues to follow the Umpqua River, heading south. OR 38 continues east, passing through the Elk Creek Tunnel Forest State Scenic Corridor, as well as the highway tunnel the park is named after. The highway continues east through the mountains of southwestern Oregon, eventually reaching the community of Drain. In Drain, it intersects with Oregon Route 99; OR 38 continues northeast from Drain on an alignment shared with OR 99. Just south of Curtin, OR 38 ends at an interchange with Interstate 5. OR 99 continues north, sharing an alignment with I-5 (diverting from it once again when it the highway reaches the city of Cottage Grove).

For the majority of its length, OR 38 is a two-lane undivided highway, with occasional passing lanes.

== Major intersections ==
Note: mileposts do not reflect actual mileage due to realignments.

The entire route is in Douglas County.

Location	mi	km	Destinations	Notes
Reedsport	0.00	0.00	US 101 – Gardiner, Florence, North Bend, Coos Bay	
Elkton	36.44	58.64	OR 138 – Sutherlin, Roseburg	
Drain	50.25	80.87	OR 99 south – Yoncalla, Roseburg	West end of OR 99 overlap
	56.37	90.72	Curtin Road – Anlauf, Lorane	Former Territorial Highway
Anlauf	57.13	91.94	I-5 (OR 99 north) – Cottage Grove, Portland, Roseburg	
1.000 mi = 1.609 km; 1.000 km = 0.621 mi: Concurrency terminus
