= Union Peak =

Eroded shield volcano in the state of Oregon

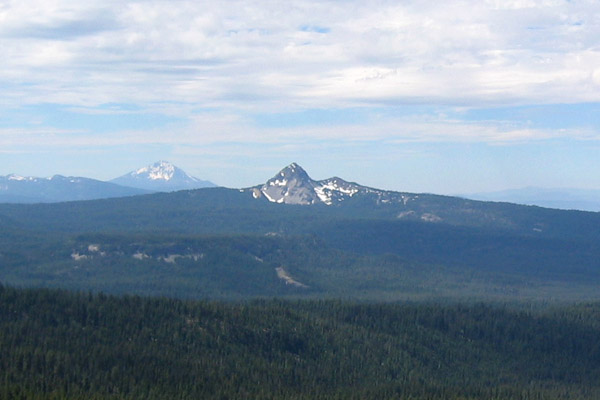
- Union Peak with Mount McLoughlin in the background as seen from Crater Lake.

Highest point
- Elevation: 7,714 ft (2,351 m)
- Prominence: 1,509 ft (460 m)
- Coordinates: 42°49′52″N 122°13′24″W

Geography
- Location: Crater Lake National Park; Klamath County, Oregon, U.S.
- Parent range: Cascade Range
- Topo map: USGS Union Peak

Geology
- Mountain type: Shield volcano
- Volcanic arc: Cascade Volcanic Arc

Union Peak is a heavily eroded shield volcano in the Cascade Range of central Oregon, located along the Cascade Crest less than 7 miles (11.3 km) southwest of the rim of Crater Lake. Ice age glaciers eroded away most of the flanks of the volcano, leaving numerous deep cirques surrounding a central glacial horn. This is the same process that formed the summit horns of Three Fingered Jack, Mount Washington, Howlock Mountain, and Mount Thielsen from other shield volcanoes farther north in the Oregon Cascades.

Union Peak is located within Crater Lake National Park, and the summit was used as a post for fire lookouts from the 1930s to the 1950s. A 5.5-mile (8.9 km) trail leads to the summit from the Pacific Crest Trail off Oregon Route 62.
