= Drain, Oregon =

- City
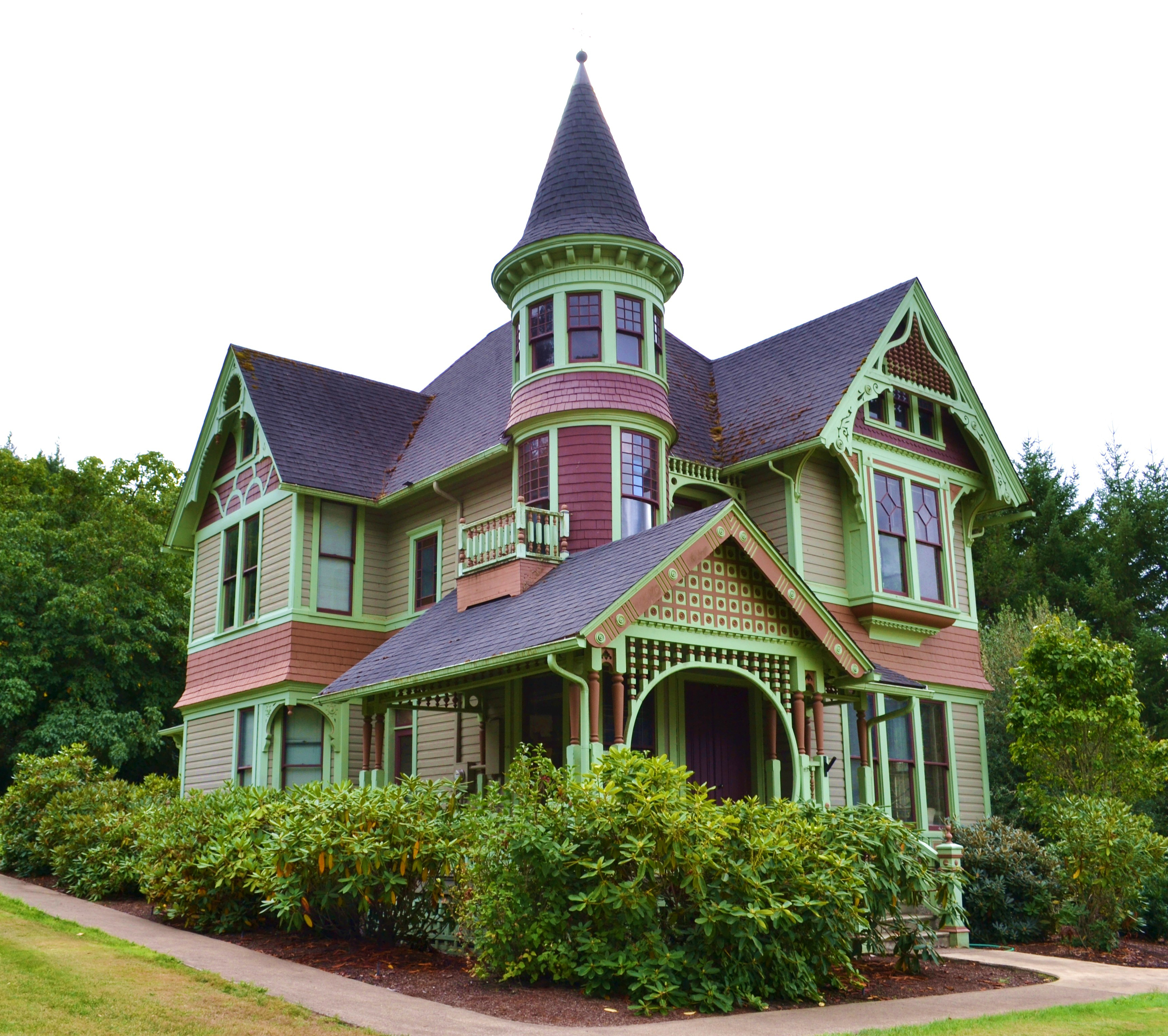
- Charles and Anna Drain House
- Motto: Gateway to the Pacific
- Location in Oregon
- Coordinates: 43°39′44″N 123°18′52″W
- Country: United States
- State: Oregon
- County: Douglas
- Incorporated: 1887

Area
  - Total: 0.63 sq mi (1.64 km^{2})
  - Land: 0.63 sq mi (1.64 km^{2})
  - Water: 0 sq mi (0.00 km^{2})
- Elevation: 289 ft (88 m)

Population (2020)
  - Total: 1,172
  - Density: 1,851.1/sq mi (714.73/km^{2})
- Time zone: UTC−8 (Pacific)
  - Summer (DST): UTC−7 (Pacific)
- ZIP code: 97435
- Area code: 541
- FIPS code: 41-20500
- GNIS feature ID: 2410354
- Website: www.cityofdrain.org

Drain is a city in Douglas County, Oregon, United States. As of the 2020 census, Drain had a population of 1,172. Drain is named after town founder and politician Charles J. Drain, who donated 60 acres (24 ha) of nearby land to the Oregon and California Railroad in 1871.

== History ==
In 1876, a coach road was established between Drain and Scottsburg. Drain was the starting point for the Drain-Coos Bay stage line, which ran to Scottsburg and then by river steamer to Gardiner and the beach on the south side of the mouth of the Umpqua River.

The Drain Normal School was founded in the community in 1883 by the Methodist Church. The state took over the school in 1885 and named it as the Central Oregon State Normal School, before it closed in June 1908.

== Geography and climate ==
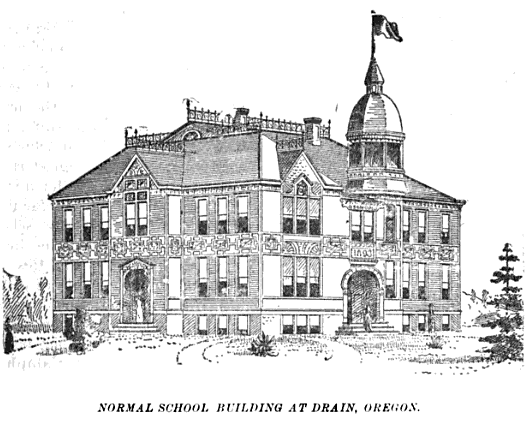
Drain Normal School in 1902

According to the United States Census Bureau, the city has a total area of 0.61 square miles (1.58 km^{2}), all of it land.

Drain is at the crossroads of Oregon Route 99 and Oregon Route 38, at a pass in the Coast Range, on the way west to the Pacific Ocean.

Elk Creek and Pass Creek, both tributaries of the Umpqua River, converge in Drain.

Pass Creek Bridge, a covered bridge in a park behind the Drain Civic Center, was formerly a road bridge. In 1987, the city moved the structure to the park and opened it to pedestrian traffic only. In 2014, the city completely closed the bridge, made unsafe by rotting support timbers.

Drain, like most of western Oregon, has a Mediterranean climate (Köppen Csb) with dry summers featuring cool mornings and hot afternoons, and chilly, if not severe, wet winters. Occasionally during the winter a cold air mass from the interior will cross the Cascades to bring very cold weather and frost, although Drain gets very little snow with a mean of 1.7 inches or 0.043 metres, a monthly maximum of 21.9 inches (0.56 m) in January 1950, and a season maximum of 23.2 inches (0.59 m) in 1970/1971. The coldest month was January 1930 with a mean of 31.3 °F (−0.4 °C), whilst January 1949 with 31.9 °F (−0.1 °C) is the only other subfreezing month. The coldest temperature ever recorded in Drain is 0 °F (−17.8 °C) on January 22, 1962. Rainfall in winter is usually heavy: the wettest month on record is December 1955 which totalled 21.93 inches (557.0 mm), whilst the wettest "rain year" since 1903 has been from July 1973 to June 1974 with 71.08 inches (1,805.4 mm) and the driest from July 1976 to June 1977 with 23.76 inches (603.5 mm). The most precipitation in a single day has been 7.70 inches (195.6 mm) on January 18, 1951.

During the summer months, days are usually hot and clear, whilst nights are cool: in the summer of 2003 only 0.21 inches (5.3 mm) of rain fell over the three months, and in 1951 no measurable precipitation occurred for ninety-five days between May 24 and August 26. When a continental airflow occurs, the weather can become extremely hot: on July 31, 2015, a record 109 °F (42.8 °C) was recorded; however, the cool nights have allowed for frost-level temperatures as low as 31 °F (−0.6 °C) on June 10 of 1916 and 30 °F (−1.1 °C) on August 28 of 1905.

Climate data for Drain, Oregon (1991–2020 normals, extremes 1902–present)
Month	Jan	Feb	Mar	Apr	May	Jun	Jul	Aug	Sep	Oct	Nov	Dec	Year
Record high °F (°C)	73 (23)	79 (26)	86 (30)	95 (35)	103 (39)	112 (44)	109 (43)	107 (42)	106 (41)	96 (36)	77 (25)	75 (24)	112 (44)
Mean daily maximum °F (°C)	50.5 (10.3)	54.5 (12.5)	59.0 (15.0)	63.7 (17.6)	70.7 (21.5)	76.1 (24.5)	84.8 (29.3)	85.7 (29.8)	80.3 (26.8)	67.8 (19.9)	55.3 (12.9)	48.8 (9.3)	66.4 (19.1)
Daily mean °F (°C)	42.6 (5.9)	44.8 (7.1)	47.8 (8.8)	51.5 (10.8)	57.2 (14.0)	62.0 (16.7)	68.1 (20.1)	68.2 (20.1)	63.3 (17.4)	54.8 (12.7)	46.9 (8.3)	41.8 (5.4)	54.1 (12.3)
Mean daily minimum °F (°C)	34.8 (1.6)	35.1 (1.7)	36.5 (2.5)	39.3 (4.1)	43.8 (6.6)	47.9 (8.8)	51.5 (10.8)	50.7 (10.4)	46.2 (7.9)	41.7 (5.4)	38.6 (3.7)	34.9 (1.6)	41.7 (5.4)
Record low °F (°C)	0 (−18)	4 (−16)	18 (−8)	22 (−6)	25 (−4)	31 (−1)	34 (1)	30 (−1)	25 (−4)	16 (−9)	12 (−11)	1 (−17)	0 (−18)
Average precipitation inches (mm)	7.31 (186)	5.49 (139)	5.44 (138)	4.25 (108)	2.69 (68)	1.24 (31)	0.33 (8.4)	0.42 (11)	1.42 (36)	3.51 (89)	6.96 (177)	8.54 (217)	47.60 (1,209)
Average snowfall inches (cm)	0.0 (0.0)	0.0 (0.0)	0.0 (0.0)	0.0 (0.0)	0.0 (0.0)	0.0 (0.0)	0.0 (0.0)	0.0 (0.0)	0.0 (0.0)	0.0 (0.0)	0.0 (0.0)	0.0 (0.0)	0.0 (0.0)
Average precipitation days (≥ 0.01 in)	19.9	17.0	19.4	14.3	12.0	8.0	2.4	2.5	6.0	13.4	20.0	20.1	158.0
Average snowy days (≥ 0.1 in)	0.3	0.1	0.0	0.0	0.0	0.0	0.0	0.0	0.0	0.0	0.1	0.2	0.7
Source: NOAA

== Demographics ==
Historical population
Census	Pop.	Note	%±
1880	188		—
1900	193		—
1910	335		73.6%
1920	607		81.2%
1930	497		−18.1%
1940	597		20.1%
1950	1,150		92.6%
1960	1,052		−8.5%
1970	1,204		14.4%
1980	1,148		−4.7%
1990	1,011		−11.9%
2000	1,021		1.0%
2010	1,151		12.7%
2020	1,172		1.8%
U.S. Decennial Census

=== 2020 census ===
As of the 2020 census, Drain had a population of 1,172. The median age was 40.4 years. 21.2% of residents were under the age of 18 and 20.5% of residents were 65 years of age or older. For every 100 females there were 100.3 males, and for every 100 females age 18 and over there were 107.2 males age 18 and over.

0% of residents lived in urban areas, while 100.0% lived in rural areas.

There were 452 households in Drain, of which 28.1% had children under the age of 18 living in them. Of all households, 40.5% were married-couple households, 23.7% were households with a male householder and no spouse or partner present, and 27.2% were households with a female householder and no spouse or partner present. About 29.0% of all households were made up of individuals and 11.9% had someone living alone who was 65 years of age or older.

There were 496 housing units, of which 8.9% were vacant. Among occupied housing units, 64.4% were owner-occupied and 35.6% were renter-occupied. The homeowner vacancy rate was 3.9% and the rental vacancy rate was 4.1%.

Racial composition as of the 2020 census
Race	Number	Percent
White	979	83.5%
Black or African American	3	0.3%
American Indian and Alaska Native	15	1.3%
Asian	8	0.7%
Native Hawaiian and Other Pacific Islander	0	0%
Some other race	29	2.5%
Two or more races	138	11.8%
Hispanic or Latino (of any race)	75	6.4%

=== 2010 census ===
As of the census of 2010, there were 1,151 people, 454 households, and 319 families residing in the city. The population density was 1,886.9 inhabitants per square mile (728.5/km^{2}). There were 492 housing units at an average density of 806.6 per square mile (311.4/km^{2}). The racial makeup of the city was 92.9% White, 0.2% African American, 2.7% Native American, 0.3% Asian, 1.0% from other races, and 3.0% from two or more races. Hispanic or Latino of any race were 4.4% of the population.

There were 454 households, of which 33.7% had children under the age of 18 living with them, 50.0% were married couples living together, 13.7% had a female householder with no husband present, 6.6% had a male householder with no wife present, and 29.7% were non-families. 22.9% of all households were made up of individuals, and 9.5% had someone living alone who was 65 years of age or older. The average household size was 2.54 and the average family size was 2.95.

The median age in the city was 39.5 years. 25.4% of residents were under the age of 18; 9.5% were between the ages of 18 and 24; 22.1% were from 25 to 44; 26.6% were from 45 to 64; and 16.4% were 65 years of age or older. The gender makeup of the city was 48.8% male and 51.2% female.

=== 2000 census ===
As of the census of 2000, there were 1,021 people, 397 households, and 289 families residing in the city. The population density was 1,879.0 inhabitants per square mile (725.5/km^{2}). There were 441 housing units at an average density of 811.6 per square mile (313.4/km^{2}). The racial makeup of the city was 90.60% White, 0.10% African American, 2.64% Native American, 0.49% Asian, 0.29% Pacific Islander, 1.57% from other races, and 4.31% from two or more races. Hispanic or Latino of any race were 3.33% of the population.

There were 397 households, out of which 36.5% had children under the age of 18 living with them, 55.7% were married couples living together, 13.4% had a female householder with no husband present, and 27.0% were non-families. 22.9% of all households were made up of individuals, and 9.6% had someone living alone who was 65 years of age or older. The average household size was 2.57 and the average family size was 3.02.

In the city, the population was spread out, with 26.7% under the age of 18, 8.8% from 18 to 24, 27.4% from 25 to 44, 23.8% from 45 to 64, and 13.2% who were 65 years of age or older. The median age was 38 years. For every 100 females, there were 96.3 males. For every 100 females age 18 and over, there were 86.5 males.

The median income for a household in the city was $27,833, and the median income for a family was $34,231. Males had a median income of $30,278 versus $20,063 for females. The per capita income for the city was $13,810. About 8.6% of families and 10.3% of the population were below the poverty line, including 10.3% of those under age 18 and 7.0% of those age 65 or over.

== Newspapers ==
The Drain Echo was the town's first newspaper. It was founded by E. W. Kuykendall in 1885. A decade later it merged with the Cottage Grove Leader in 1895 to form the Echo-Leader and ceased two years later. Miss Laura E. Jones started the North Douglas Watchman in 1898 and it was discontinued after three years. The Drain Nonpareil founded by A. T. Fetter was published from 1901 to 1914. W. A. Priaulx founded The Drain Enterprise on May 4, 1922. The Anderson family bought the Enterprise in 1950 and operated it for three generations until closing the paper in 2015.
