= List of mountain passes in Oregon =

There are at least 319 mountain passes in the U. S. state of Oregon.

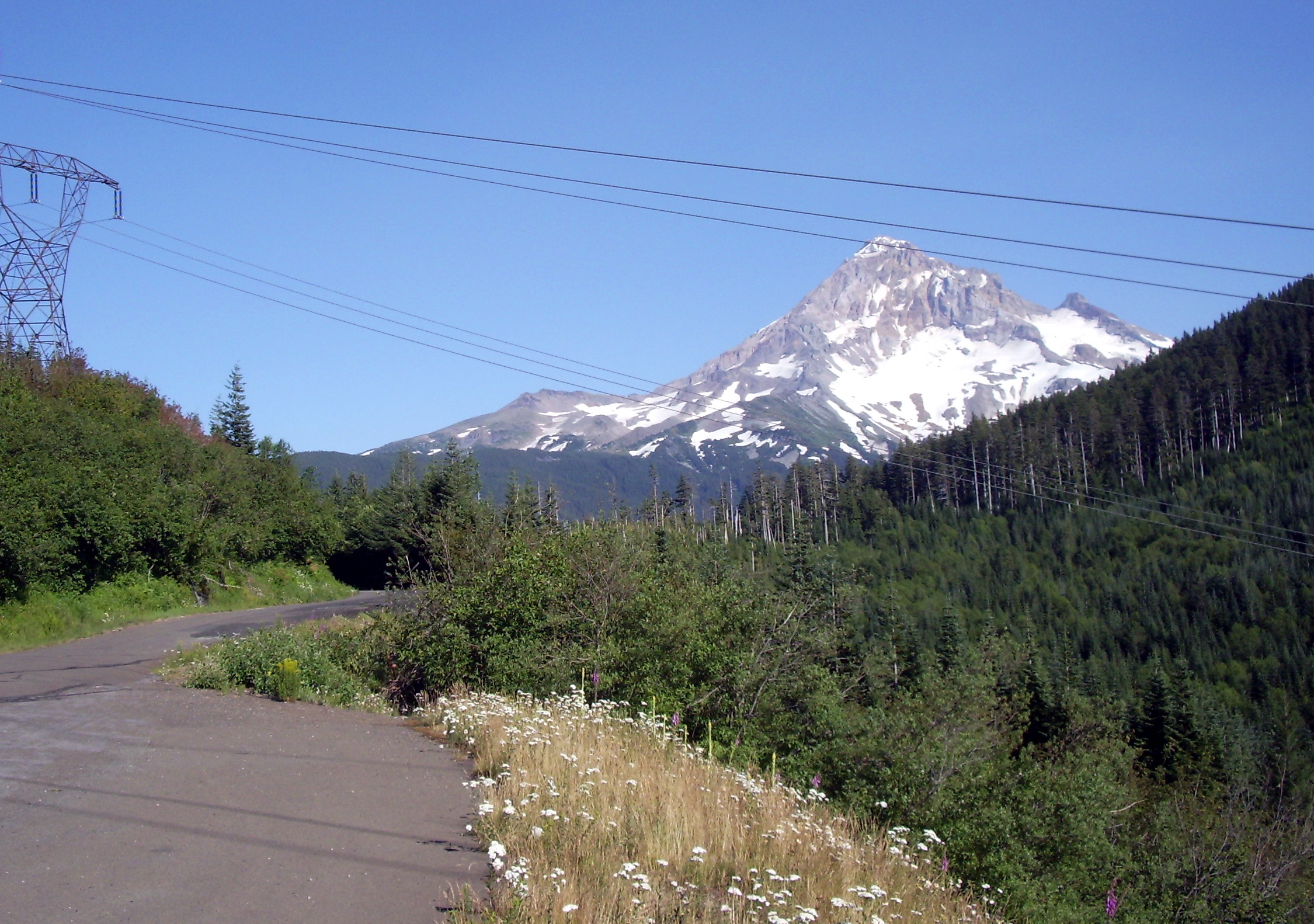
Lolo Pass seen from west of the pass. The Pacific Crest Trail traverses left and right across the pass; Mount Hood's northwest face is visible in the background.

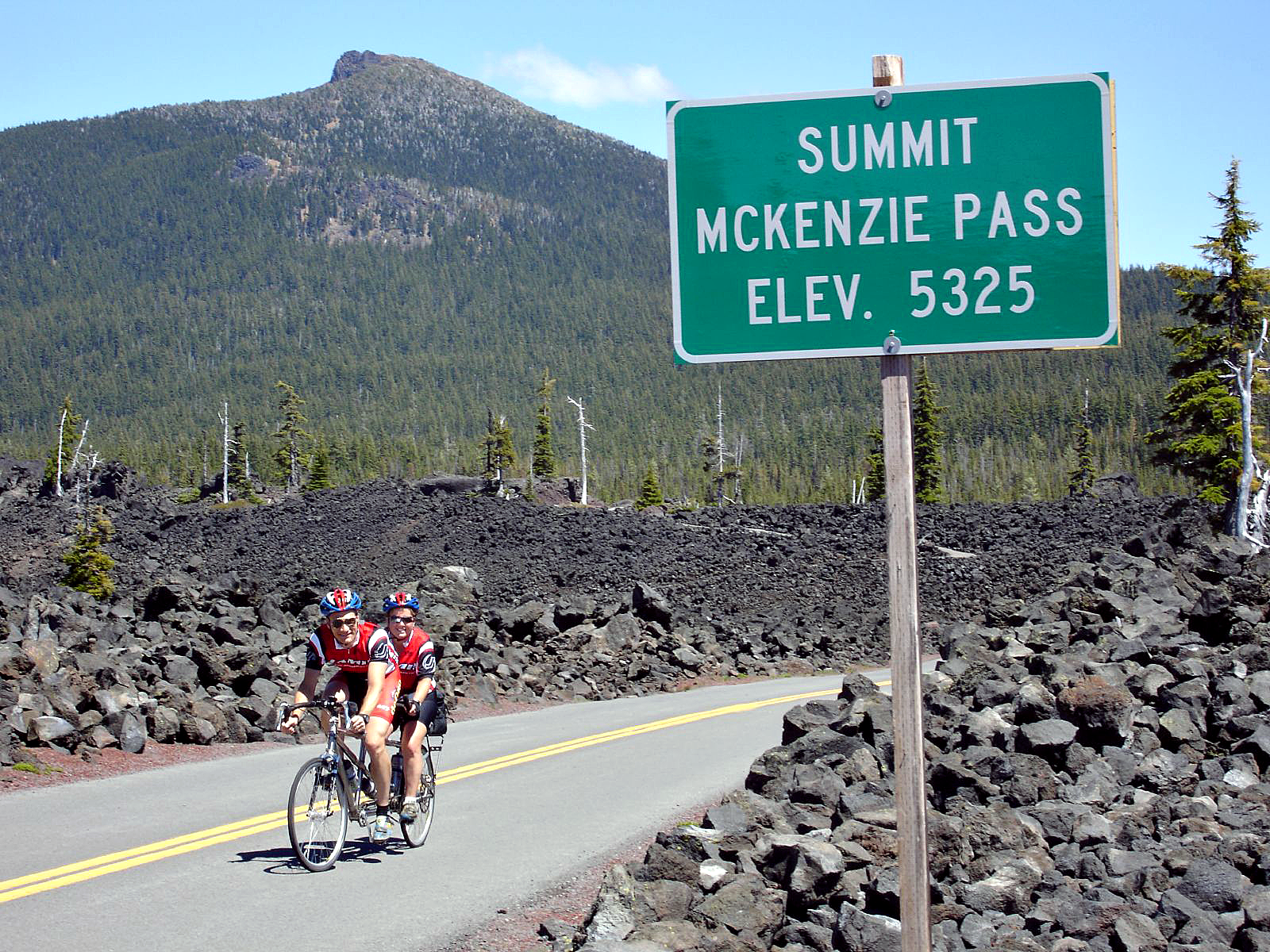
Cyclists cross and descend the McKenzie Pass on Oregon Route 242

There are several words in use for a mountain pass in Oregon; the usage for each is:

Name	Usage count
gap	99
pass	100
saddle	61
summit	36
narrows	7
gate	3
notch	3
divide	2

Name	Elevation	Coordinates	USGS Map	GNIS ID
Abbot Pass	3,550 ft (1,080 m)	45°07′50″N 121°42′18″W	Wapinitia Pass	1136999
Agness Pass	2,372 ft (723 m)	42°40′57″N 124°04′41″W	Illahe	1155753
Alsea Summit	1,211 ft (369 m)	44°28′00″N 123°30′13″W	Alsea	1159251
Altnow Gap	4,409 ft (1,344 m)	43°44′27″N 118°15′54″W	Upton Mountain	1116895
Anaktuvuk Saddle	3,300 ft (1,000 m)	42°47′44″N 123°46′14″W	Mount Bolivar	1154616
Arrow Gap	4,570 ft (1,390 m)	43°10′50″N 120°54′11″W	Tuff Butte	1160630
Arrowhead Saddle	4,131 ft (1,259 m)	44°47′09″N 122°16′59″W	Elkhorn	1153364
Avery Pass	6,289 ft (1,917 m)	42°34′13″N 120°33′15″W	Morgan Butte	1137355
Axtell Gap	4,183 ft (1,275 m)	44°04′20″N 119°46′19″W	Angell Butte	1157484
Baker Pass	4,380 ft (1,340 m)	43°04′17″N 118°11′44″W	Folly Farm	1117160
Bald Gap	3,940 ft (1,200 m)	44°42′08″N 120°04′38″W	Toney Butte	1117171
Barlow Pass	4,157 ft (1,267 m)	45°16′57″N 121°41′07″W	Mount Hood South	1137526
Battle Mountain Summit	4,288 ft (1,307 m)	45°16′15″N 118°58′33″W	Carney Butte	1137598
Beachie Saddle	4,226 ft (1,288 m)	44°49′06″N 122°08′42″W	Battle Ax	1137613
Bear Pass	4,324 ft (1,318 m)	44°19′26″N 122°15′36″W	Tidbits Mountain	1117392
Bear Pen Gap	2,963 ft (903 m)	42°21′49″N 123°11′21″W	Applegate	1159269
Beard Saddle	3,163 ft (964 m)	44°41′29″N 122°08′19″W	Detroit	1137783
Beatty Gap	4,318 ft (1,316 m)	42°26′50″N 121°14′19″W	Ferguson Mountain	1161675
Beech Creek Summit	4,705 ft (1,434 m)	44°34′17″N 119°07′29″W	Johnson Saddle	1156941
Bennett Pass	4,665 ft (1,422 m)	45°18′38″N 121°38′34″W	Mount Hood South	1137927
Biddle Pass	5,344 ft (1,629 m)	44°40′35″N 121°43′12″W	Lionshead	1137963
Big Saddle	2,228 ft (679 m)	44°50′35″N 123°42′19″W	Valsetz	1117662
Big Saddle	2,815 ft (858 m)	45°51′38″N 118°15′36″W	Weston Mountain	1117663
Big Saddle	4,649 ft (1,417 m)	45°33′58″N 118°07′14″W	Sanderson Spring	1138062
Big Sand Gap	4,183 ft (1,275 m)	42°29′05″N 118°23′02″W	Tule Springs	1157217
Bills Pass	3,383 ft (1,031 m)	45°00′06″N 120°26′39″W	Chimney Springs	1117704
Bingen Gap	79 ft (24 m)	45°42′22″N 121°28′14″W	White Salmon	1132085
Bingen Gap	279 ft (85 m)	45°42′00″N 121°24′28″W	White Salmon	1503379
Black Tank Saddle	2,005 ft (611 m)	44°51′48″N 123°47′34″W	Euchre Mountain	1135577
Blizzard Gap	6,125 ft (1,867 m)	42°05′50″N 119°40′09″W	Blizzard Gap	1117818
Blue Box Pass	3,973 ft (1,211 m)	45°12′30″N 121°41′58″W	Wapinitia Pass	1138284
Blue Mountain Pass	5,285 ft (1,611 m)	42°19′06″N 117°49′20″W	Blue Mountain Pass	1136081
Blue Mountain Summit	5,105 ft (1,556 m)	44°32′54″N 118°21′01″W	Pogue Point	1138323
Bly Mountain Pass	5,072 ft (1,546 m)	42°21′15″N 121°23′50″W	Yonna	1161280
Bohemia Saddle	5,384 ft (1,641 m)	43°34′55″N 122°39′19″W	Fairview Peak	1153347
Boulder Pass	2,671 ft (814 m)	44°56′51″N 123°36′06″W	Laurel Mountain	1117983
Brogan Hill Summit	3,983 ft (1,214 m)	44°16′42″N 117°38′58″W	Cow Valley East	1158142
Buckaroo Pass	5,682 ft (1,732 m)	42°19′25″N 119°23′24″W	Lone Grave Butte	1129847
Buckaroo Pass	5,935 ft (1,809 m)	42°03′37″N 120°41′32″W	Dog Lake	1138839
Buckaroo Pass	5,863 ft (1,787 m)	42°15′31″N 119°21′08″W	Mahogany Butte	1161291
Buckwilder Pass	6,539 ft (1,993 m)	42°20′38″N 118°42′31″W	Fields	1118252
Bull Gap	5,551 ft (1,692 m)	42°05′43″N 122°41′03″W	Mount Ashland	1138905
Bull Pine Gap	3,888 ft (1,185 m)	42°09′46″N 122°51′02″W	Talent	1138911
Burger Pass	7,844 ft (2,391 m)	45°08′46″N 117°30′44″W	China Cap	1138968
Burnt Hill Summit	1,696 ft (517 m)	42°12′44″N 124°20′14″W	Carpenterville	1638136
Burton Saddle	4,295 ft (1,309 m)	45°06′00″N 119°41′12″W	Chapin Creek	1139023
Butch Foster Saddle	4,560 ft (1,390 m)	44°29′02″N 118°51′19″W	Castle Creek	1139031
Butte Creek Pass	3,110 ft (950 m)	45°03′09″N 120°32′17″W	Bath Canyon	1118394
Canyon Creek Pass	2,021 ft (616 m)	42°49′40″N 123°15′36″W	Quines Creek	1118582
Captain Keeney Pass	2,890 ft (880 m)	43°54′45″N 117°10′44″W	Vale East	1132087
Champion Saddle	4,967 ft (1,514 m)	43°34′43″N 122°38′05″W	Fairview Peak	1139560
Chandler Pass	1,362 ft (415 m)	44°48′51″N 123°39′48″W	Valsetz	1118817
Chetco Pass	3,566 ft (1,087 m)	42°16′45″N 123°49′45″W	Pearsoll Peak	1139615
Chilkoot Pass	4,869 ft (1,484 m)	44°24′29″N 119°29′18″W	Aldrich Mountain North	1161311
China Gap	1,870 ft (570 m)	42°35′08″N 123°09′01″W	Wimer	1118910
Cinnabar Gap	4,541 ft (1,384 m)	42°06′49″N 122°50′24″W	Siskiyou Peak	1156842
Clatskanie Hill Summit	760 ft (230 m)	46°05′39″N 123°07′13″W	Clatskanie Hill	1156842
Clatsop Crest Summit	656 ft (200 m)	46°10′14″N 123°26′27″W	Clatskanie Hill	1156842
Cline Hill Summit	771 ft (235 m)	44°37′11″N 123°38′39″W	Harlan	1163929
Cobb Saddle	4,167 ft (1,270 m)	44°55′55″N 120°04′40″W	Kinzua	1119064
Coffee Gap	377 ft (115 m)	44°17′55″N 123°17′43″W	Monroe	1119078
Coggins Saddle	4,268 ft (1,301 m)	42°08′34″N 122°41′24″W	Ashland	1155146
Coker Gap	1,552 ft (473 m)	42°33′59″N 123°08′42″W	Wimer	1135410
Cornelius Pass	581 ft (177 m)	45°36′32″N 122°51′47″W	Linnton	1119284
Coryell Pass	515 ft (157 m)	44°01′22″N 123°01′38″W	Eugene East	1119307
Cougar Gap	5,377 ft (1,639 m)	42°01′41″N 123°13′55″W	Carberry Creek	1140228
Cougar Pass	715 ft (218 m)	44°03′19″N 123°31′51″W	Walton	1119384
Cougar Pass	728 ft (222 m)	43°35′49″N 123°22′19″W	Yoncalla	1133059
Crane Creek Gap	4,167 ft (1,270 m)	43°24′06″N 118°31′22″W	Crane	1119508
Criterion Summit	3,360 ft (1,020 m)	44°58′58″N 120°59′26″W	Shaniko Junction	1136193
Crotchline Saddle	1,083 ft (330 m)	44°21′47″N 124°00′56″W	Yachats	1140484
Cummings Hill Summit	3,327 ft (1,014 m)	45°02′35″N 120°11′55″W	Fossil North	1119622
Cunningham Saddle	7,789 ft (2,374 m)	44°55′30″N 118°14′20″W	Anthony Lakes	1119627
Dead Horse Gap	4,301 ft (1,311 m)	44°55′27″N 120°02′50″W	Kinzua	1119740
Deadman Pass	3,609 ft (1,100 m)	45°36′03″N 118°30′14″W	Cabbage Hill	1119762
Dean Pass	4,219 ft (1,286 m)	44°32′35″N 117°14′09″W	Connor Creek	1129563
Debenger Gap	1,591 ft (485 m)	42°32′48″N 122°52′28″W	Shady Cove	1119778
Desolation Saddle	915 ft (279 m)	44°21′20″N 124°00′21″W	Yachats	1140926
Devils Gap	1,588 ft (484 m)	45°18′26″N 120°03′31″W	Devils Gap	1119902
Devils Gate	3,238 ft (987 m)	43°32′48″N 117°09′44″W	Owyhee Ridge	1119904
Dixie Summit	5,279 ft (1,609 m)	44°32′13″N 118°35′52″W	Bates	1141086
Doe Gap	3,753 ft (1,144 m)	42°07′53″N 123°52′14″W	Josephine Mountain	1141113
Domingo Pass	6,417 ft (1,956 m)	42°12′20″N 118°46′08″W	Rincon Flat	1160326
Dooley Summit	5,420 ft (1,650 m)	44°34′22″N 117°50′20″W	Dooley Mountain	1120029
Downey Saddle	4,642 ft (1,415 m)	45°55′01″N 116°56′30″W	Jim Creek Butte	1141224
Drews Gap	5,298 ft (1,615 m)	42°11′58″N 120°36′55″W	Drews Gap	1158217
Drinkwater Pass	4,216 ft (1,285 m)	43°47′05″N 118°16′43″W	Drinkwater Pass	1120090
Dry Creek Pass	5,036 ft (1,535 m)	43°29′55″N 117°57′23″W	Star Creek Reservoir	1120148
Duncan Gap	3,376 ft (1,029 m)	42°07′50″N 122°52′18″W	Talent	1141402
Dusty Saddle	4,892 ft (1,491 m)	45°36′22″N 118°10′31″W	Thimbleberry Mountain	1141425
Dutch Flat Saddle	7,926 ft (2,416 m)	44°55′46″N 118°13′36″W	Anthony Lakes	1120235
Eagle Gap	3,720 ft (1,130 m)	42°15′31″N 123°48′56″W	Pearsoll Peak	1141477
East Pass	5,010 ft (1,530 m)	43°11′03″N 119°44′18″W	Goose Egg Butte	1134115
Eldorado Pass	4,642 ft (1,415 m)	44°20′18″N 118°05′09″W	Eldorado Pass	1141724
Emigrant Pass	5,646 ft (1,721 m)	43°28′00″N 122°08′21″W	Emigrant Butte	1141860
Fairbanks Gap	682 ft (208 m)	45°38′02″N 121°00′36″W	Stacker Butte	1120555
Fingerboard Saddle	4,347 ft (1,325 m)	45°42′32″N 116°38′34″W	Fingerboard Saddle	1142097
Fitzwater Pass	5,771 ft (1,759 m)	42°02′29″N 120°35′16″W	Fitzwater Point	1142188
Fourmile Gap	656 ft (200 m)	45°48′38″N 119°09′19″W	Stanfield	1120923
Fourmile Gap	3,091 ft (942 m)	44°57′18″N 119°20′50″W	Slickear Mountain	1142371
Frazier Pass	7,503 ft (2,287 m)	45°09′21″N 117°19′45″W	Eagle Cap	1142427
Free and Easy Pass	2,149 ft (655 m)	42°12′27″N 123°41′35″W	Cave Junction	1142437
Freeland Saddle	4,176 ft (1,273 m)	42°29′39″N 123°42′49″W	Chrome Ridge	1155739
Freezeout Saddle	5,374 ft (1,638 m)	45°22′42″N 116°44′12″W	Hat Point	1142448
French Gulch Divide	3,258 ft (993 m)	42°02′56″N 123°03′47″W	Squaw Lakes	1142470
French Pass	4,042 ft (1,232 m)	45°01′38″N 119°38′11″W	Chapin Creek	1142471
Gand Saddle	5,856 ft (1,785 m)	44°21′24″N 118°51′24″W	Pine Creek Mountain	1142566
Glacier Pass	8,497 ft (2,590 m)	45°10′00″N 117°17′13″W	Eagle Cap	1142754
Goolaway Gap	3,041 ft (927 m)	42°44′39″N 123°05′06″W	Skeleton Mountain	1142850
Government Harvey Pass	7,096 ft (2,163 m)	42°42′03″N 120°47′49″W	Harvey Creek	1142884
Graham Pass	4,304 ft (1,312 m)	44°54′56″N 121°57′30″W	Mount Lowe	1142902
Green Springs Summit	4,583 ft (1,397 m)	42°07′39″N 122°29′15″W	Hyatt Reservoir	1136340
Griffin Pass	5,755 ft (1,754 m)	42°14′34″N 122°18′32″W	Little Chinquapin Mountain	1143084
Grouse Creek Gap	6,640 ft (2,020 m)	42°04′54″N 122°44′24″W	Mount Ashland	1155141
Grub Box Gap	4,373 ft (1,333 m)	42°51′43″N 122°36′38″W	Whetstone Point	1143141
Gumjuwac Saddle	5,233 ft (1,595 m)	45°19′59″N 121°32′58″W	Badger Lake	1143155
Gunsight Pass	6,312 ft (1,924 m)	43°13′46″N 117°16′06″W	McCain Creek	1121491
Gunsight Pass	2,821 ft (860 m)	44°16′52″N 123°34′15″W	Prairie Peak	1637982
H. B. Van Duzer Forest State Scenic Corridor	760 ft (230 m)	45°02′39″N 123°48′09″W	Dolph	1151724
Hanley Gap	4,272 ft (1,302 m)	42°04′09″N 123°01′07″W	Squaw Lakes	1116514
Hansen Saddle	3,839 ft (1,170 m)	42°32′12″N 123°41′47″W	Mount Peavine	1143271
Harvey Gap	4,705 ft (1,434 m)	44°28′02″N 120°37′37″W	Salt Butte	1143347
Hawkins Pass	8,304 ft (2,531 m)	45°08′46″N 117°16′03″W	Eagle Cap	1143381
Hayden Mountain Summit	4,701 ft (1,433 m)	42°07′02″N 122°06′36″W	Chicken Hills	1134015
Hayes Hill Summit	1,890 ft (580 m)	42°19′57″N 123°35′07″W	Selma	1159161
Hayworth Saddle	2,618 ft (798 m)	44°12′20″N 122°59′00″W	Mohawk	2496998
Helena Saddle	5,223 ft (1,592 m)	43°34′57″N 122°37′19″W	Bearbones Mountain	1153349
Hellgate	1,719 ft (524 m)	44°52′47″N 121°13′44″W	Mutton Mountain	1121741
Hells Gate	243 ft (74 m)	42°47′56″N 124°18′08″W	Mount Butler	1135000
High Pass	1,522 ft (464 m)	44°13′41″N 123°25′42″W	Horton	1134085
Hodge Pass	3,228 ft (984 m)	43°44′36″N 118°07′01″W	Juntura	1121862
Hogback Summit	5,003 ft (1,525 m)	42°47′35″N 120°05′03″W	Coleman Hills	1134009
Holmes Gap	174 ft (53 m)	44°59′55″N 123°12′35″W	Rickreall	1121930
Hominy Saddle	3,737 ft (1,139 m)	45°33′39″N 116°34′41″W	Temperance Creek	1143688
Horn Gap	4,662 ft (1,421 m)	42°08′42″N 122°44′56″W	Ashland	1143733
Horning Gap	4,649 ft (1,417 m)	43°14′57″N 120°59′59″W	Tuff Butte	1158293
Horse Pasture Ridge Saddle	4,616 ft (1,407 m)	45°52′39″N 117°09′10″W	Paradise	1143778
Horse Ridge Summit	4,295 ft (1,309 m)	43°54′34″N 121°00′07″W	Horse Ridge	1143787
Horton Pass	8,471 ft (2,582 m)	45°10′12″N 117°18′57″W	Eagle Cap	1143825
Huckleberry Gap	5,305 ft (1,617 m)	42°54′59″N 122°35′04″W	Abbott Butte	1155019
Hunter Hill Pass	4,249 ft (1,295 m)	42°50′04″N 120°47′48″W	Fremont Point	1143936
Indian Gap	1,529 ft (466 m)	44°44′12″N 123°41′03″W	Nortons	1135542
Jacks Saddle	3,579 ft (1,091 m)	43°31′09″N 122°43′34″W	Fairview Peak	1155374
Jackson Gap	6,880 ft (2,100 m)	42°01′40″N 122°52′41″W	Dutchman Peak	1144207
Jackson Summit	6,368 ft (1,941 m)	42°13′57″N 117°39′59″W	Jackson Summit	1134360
Johnson Saddle	5,371 ft (1,637 m)	44°34′33″N 119°02′36″W	Johnson Saddle	1122494
Jones Hill Summit	3,192 ft (973 m)	45°22′41″N 119°20′49″W	Lena	1639108
Juniper Gap	3,658 ft (1,115 m)	44°42′41″N 120°04′05″W	Toney Butte	1158305
Kelly Gap	5,134 ft (1,565 m)	44°13′55″N 120°22′48″W	Post	1144527
Kerr Notch	6,686 ft (2,038 m)	42°54′44″N 122°04′18″W	Crater Lake East	1144572
Keys Creek Summit	4,403 ft (1,342 m)	44°33′09″N 120°02′34″W	Keyes Mountain	1638454
Kings Saddle	5,528 ft (1,685 m)	42°00′47″N 123°25′53″W	Oregon Caves	1144624
Klaskanine Summit	1,014 ft (309 m)	46°02′49″N 123°40′14″W	Green Mountain	1132300
Knutson Saddle	4,370 ft (1,330 m)	44°45′06″N 122°14′14″W	Battle Ax	1144696
Lamb Saddle	3,451 ft (1,052 m)	42°09′18″N 122°42′08″W	Ashland	1134725
Larch Summit	5,079 ft (1,548 m)	44°40′57″N 118°11′30″W	Sumpter	1144828
Lava Pass	5,026 ft (1,532 m)	43°37′16″N 121°01′49″W	South Ice Cave	1145580
Lewisburg Saddle	948 ft (289 m)	44°38′13″N 123°17′46″W	Airlie South	1134738
Little Lobster Summit	945 ft (288 m)	44°18′34″N 123°38′09″W	Digger Mountain	1135706
Little Sand Gap	4,167 ft (1,270 m)	42°25′40″N 118°25′04″W	Tule Springs	1157218
Little Selle Gap	4,685 ft (1,428 m)	43°40′11″N 118°11′13″W	Selle Gap	1123277
Little Windy Pass	5,482 ft (1,671 m)	42°03′27″N 118°25′42″W	Windy Point	1157697
Lolo Pass	3,438 ft (1,048 m)	45°25′36″N 121°47′45″W	Bull Run Lake	1145348
Lone Pine Saddle	2,694 ft (821 m)	45°48′16″N 116°43′56″W	Cactus Mountain	1145358
Lone Tree Pass	2,572 ft (784 m)	42°28′38″N 123°39′59″W	Chrome Ridge	1155740
Long Creek Mountain Summit	5,098 ft (1,554 m)	44°40′50″N 119°07′52″W	Fox	1638117
Long Hollow Summit	5,610 ft (1,710 m)	42°19′03″N 118°45′02″W	Fields	1123430
Lookout Gap	3,501 ft (1,067 m)	42°21′27″N 123°38′32″W	Eight Dollar Mountain	1145464
Lost Lake Saddle	8,022 ft (2,445 m)	44°54′05″N 118°14′07″W	Anthony Lakes	1123513
Low Divide	3,596 ft (1,096 m)	42°08′23″N 123°21′55″W	Williams	1145585
Low Gap	5,348 ft (1,630 m)	42°00′49″N 123°16′39″W	Grayback Mountain	1145587
Low Gap	4,308 ft (1,313 m)	44°47′45″N 119°01′31″W	Flowers Gulch	1145588
Low Pass	1,073 ft (327 m)	44°11′21″N 123°28′54″W	Horton	1133209
Lyle Gap	2,116 ft (645 m)	44°45′57″N 121°00′14″W	Gateway	1123625
Mahogany Gap	5,000 ft (1,500 m)	43°12′04″N 117°10′47″W	Mahogany Gap	1123681
Maiden Peak Saddle	6,089 ft (1,856 m)	43°36′46″N 122°00′12″W	Willamette Pass	1155492
Maklaks Pass	6,188 ft (1,886 m)	42°51′40″N 122°03′43″W	Maklaks Crater	1145767
Malheur Gap	4,111 ft (1,253 m)	43°15′14″N 118°32′54″W	New Princeton	1123708
Maple Dell Gap	4,895 ft (1,492 m)	42°00′41″N 122°57′43″W	Dutchman Peak	1145795
Marmot Pass	5,800 ft (1,800 m)	43°19′29″N 121°41′38″W	Walker Mountain	1145824
McKay Saddle	5,056 ft (1,541 m)	44°31′12″N 120°37′34″W	Dutchman Creek	1145992
McKenzie Pass	5,213 ft (1,589 m)	44°15′35″N 121°48′35″W	Mount Washington	1145999
Meadow Brook Summit	4,131 ft (1,259 m)	44°54′52″N 119°00′30″W	Meadow Brook Summit	1146042
Michigan Pass	1,033 ft (315 m)	43°31′43″N 123°50′04″W	Loon Lake	1134837
Millers Gap	1,201 ft (366 m)	44°43′44″N 123°41′39″W	Nortons	1135541
Minam Summit	3,665 ft (1,117 m)	45°36′12″N 117°45′51″W	Cricket Flat	1158377
Mingo Gap	4,157 ft (1,267 m)	42°01′09″N 123°03′41″W	Squaw Lakes	1116513
Minto Pass	5,325 ft (1,623 m)	44°30′48″N 121°48′41″W	Marion Lake	1146347
Moss Pass	6,375 ft (1,943 m)	42°28′16″N 120°29′56″W	Clover Flat	1124397
Murray Saddle	7,054 ft (2,150 m)	45°21′59″N 117°21′30″W	Chief Joseph Mountain	1146690
Neuman Gap	3,297 ft (1,005 m)	42°49′25″N 122°58′17″W	Richter Mountain	1146796
Newsome Saddle	5,144 ft (1,568 m)	44°03′04″N 120°33′57″W	Conant Basin	1133882
Nichols Gap	2,087 ft (636 m)	42°31′17″N 122°45′26″W	Shady Cove	1124680
Ninemile Saddle	6,024 ft (1,836 m)	45°33′49″N 116°36′47″W	Temperance Creek	1146840
Nip and Tuck Pass	7,720 ft (2,350 m)	44°54′43″N 118°13′54″W	Anthony Lakes	1124694
Noyas Pass	2,142 ft (653 m)	43°45′55″N 122°49′41″W	Kloster Mountain	1134058
Observation Gap	7,014 ft (2,138 m)	42°01′09″N 122°53′09″W	Dutchman Peak	1147132
Ochoco Summit	4,741 ft (1,445 m)	44°30′05″N 120°23′12″W	Stephenson Mountain	1147146
Oleachea Pass	6,749 ft (2,057 m)	42°10′05″N 118°44′49″W	Ladycomb Peak	1160319
Opie Dilldock Pass	6,906 ft (2,105 m)	44°11′26″N 121°47′30″W	North Sister	1147255
Overshoe Pass	4,774 ft (1,455 m)	42°25′28″N 117°44′11″W	Battle Creek Ranch	1125073
P O Saddle	5,748 ft (1,752 m)	45°14′19″N 116°45′42″W	Puderbaugh Ridge	1158428
Packsaddle Gap	5,735 ft (1,748 m)	44°19′06″N 119°12′24″W	McClellan Mountain	1147339
Park Saddle	5,394 ft (1,644 m)	45°09′35″N 118°19′15″W	Little Beaver Creek	1125179
Parrish Gap	518 ft (158 m)	44°45′48″N 122°57′37″W	Turner	1125198
Pengra Pass	5,010 ft (1,530 m)	43°35′31″N 122°03′29″W	Willamette Pass	1147579
Picture Rock Pass	4,830 ft (1,470 m)	43°02′52″N 120°47′55″W		
Pileup Saddle	4,951 ft (1,509 m)	45°35′38″N 118°13′05″W	Thimbleberry Mountain	1147668
Pioneer Summit	348 ft (106 m)	44°40′46″N 123°53′38″W	Toledo North	1125440
Quartz Mountain Pass	5,508 ft (1,679 m)	42°19′35″N 120°49′16″W	Quartz Valley	1125739
Railroad Gap	4,114 ft (1,254 m)	42°44′23″N 122°58′13″W	Cleveland Ridge	1148163
Randall Saddle	1,138 ft (347 m)	44°32′02″N 123°46′53″W	Elk City	1125803
Randcore Pass	4,170 ft (1,270 m)	42°04′23″N 122°24′09″W	Soda Mountain	1125804
Red Gap	2,585 ft (788 m)	44°44′03″N 120°24′20″W	Sandrock Mountain	1125881
Red Heifer Pass	3,369 ft (1,027 m)	44°36′04″N 122°17′29″W	Quartzville	1134877
Red Rock Pass	4,600 ft (1,400 m)	44°36′24″N 120°26′11″W	Stephenson Mountain	1148332
Red Saddle	4,255 ft (1,297 m)	45°27′23″N 118°19′19″W	Huron	1148333
Red Wolf Pass	4,108 ft (1,252 m)	45°03′25″N 121°42′31″W	Mount Wilson	1148342
Richardson Gap	348 ft (106 m)	44°40′57″N 122°48′12″W	Scio	1125983
Ritter Butte Summit	4,012 ft (1,223 m)	44°50′12″N 119°03′54″W	Flowers Gulch	1158237
Roberts Mountain Pass	965 ft (294 m)	43°6′36″N 123°21′17″W	Myrtle Creek	
Round Mountain Pass	4,885 ft (1,489 m)	43°46′23″N 121°42′16″W	Round Mountain	1148792
Round Pass	6,814 ft (2,077 m)	42°29′59″N 120°30′41″W	Shoestring Butte	1148795
Rowena Gap	79 ft (24 m)	45°40′37″N 121°14′44″W	The Dalles North	1132108
Rowena Gap	79 ft (24 m)	45°40′37″N 121°14′44″W	The Dalles North	1525257
Saddle A	1,978 ft (603 m)	42°46′12″N 124°06′42″W	China Flat	1134570
Sand Gap	4,167 ft (1,270 m)	43°11′19″N 118°25′56″W	Sand Gap	1126555
Sand Gap	4,094 ft (1,248 m)	43°13′35″N 119°02′34″W	Southeast Harney Lake	1130069
Sand Pass	8,054 ft (2,455 m)	45°08′16″N 117°30′37″W	China Cap	1149039
Sandoz Gap	4,150 ft (1,260 m)	42°48′35″N 122°33′06″W	Whetstone Point	1149050
Sandy Saddle	7,618 ft (2,322 m)	45°17′22″N 117°29′04″W	North Minam Meadows	1149060
Santiam Pass	4,800 ft (1,500 m)	44°24′07″N 121°51′05″W	Three Fingered Jack	1149067
Saulsberry Saddle	5,814 ft (1,772 m)	45°15′16″N 116°45′18″W	Jaynes Ridge	1149079
Sawmill Gap	2,776 ft (846 m)	42°41′50″N 123°36′13″W	Mount Reuben	1126620
Sawtooth Crater	5,010 ft (1,530 m)	44°58′32″N 117°32′32″W	Sawtooth Ridge	1126622
Scott Pass	6,063 ft (1,848 m)	44°13′58″N 121°46′30″W	North Sister	1149172
Section Line Gap	4,331 ft (1,320 m)	42°11′03″N 122°51′26″W	Talent	1149216
Selle Gap	4,386 ft (1,337 m)	43°38′57″N 118°10′49″W	Selle Gap	1126732
Sexton Mountain Pass	1,991 ft (607 m)	42°36′04″N 123°22′59″W	Merlin	1134829
Shady Gap	3,287 ft (1,002 m)	43°41′08″N 122°18′42″W	McCredie Springs	1149276
Shane Saddle	4,747 ft (1,447 m)	43°33′42″N 122°40′12″W	Fairview Peak	1149285
Shaniko Summit	3,602 ft (1,098 m)	44°59′28″N 120°50′19″W	Shaniko Summit	1136744
Shasta Gap	5,879 ft (1,792 m)	44°26′48″N 117°40′40″W	Bridgeport	1126798
Shasta Gap	3,684 ft (1,123 m)	44°23′43″N 117°45′59″W	Wendt Butte	1638669
Sheep Creek Hill Summit	4,606 ft (1,404 m)	45°20′15″N 117°06′34″W	Kinney Lake	1153701
Shirley Gap	3,550 ft (1,080 m)	43°32′07″N 122°58′42″W	Burnt Mountain	1134632
Silver Fork Gap	6,207 ft (1,892 m)	42°02′26″N 122°54′50″W	Dutchman Peak	1149496
Siskiyou Gap	5,932 ft (1,808 m)	42°03′01″N 122°48′25″W	Siskiyou Peak	1158487
Siskiyou Pass	4,488 ft (1,368 m)	42°03′01″N 122°36′10″W	Siskiyou Pass	1127005
Siskiyou Summit	4,310 ft (1,310 m)	42°03′34″N 122°36′29″W	Siskiyou Pass	
Sluice Creek Saddle	6,470 ft (1,970 m)	45°27′47″N 116°39′15″W	Hat Point	1149736
Smith Gate	4,255 ft (1,297 m)	45°33′42″N 118°21′20″W	Duncan	1149753
Smith Hill Summit	1,588 ft (484 m)	42°39′54″N 123°22′44″W	Glendale	1134146
Songen Gap	2,398 ft (731 m)	42°08′15″N 122°36′05″W	Emigrant Lake	1127210
Sourgrass Summit	679 ft (207 m)	45°05′46″N 123°44′38″W	Midway	1149895
South Pass	6,621 ft (2,018 m)	42°19′49″N 122°04′04″W	Aspen Lake	1154958
Spain Saddle	4,042 ft (1,232 m)	45°46′58″N 116°48′01″W	Deadhorse Ridge	1150099
Squaw Creek Gap	5,049 ft (1,539 m)	42°03′58″N 122°56′11″W	Dutchman Peak	1116506
Stage Road Pass	1,814 ft (553 m)	42°43′49″N 123°22′09″W	Golden	1127518
Steampot Saddle	4,350 ft (1,330 m)	44°46′54″N 122°16′24″W	Elkhorn	1153365
Stinkingwater Pass	4,846 ft (1,477 m)	43°41′30″N 118°32′24″W	Stinkingwater Pass	1127615
Stringer Gap	1,273 ft (388 m)	42°22′37″N 123°23′33″W	Wilderville	1150495
Sturgil Saddle	7,798 ft (2,377 m)	45°18′22″N 117°29′27″W	North Minam Meadows	1638062
Sucker Creek Gap	5,167 ft (1,575 m)	42°00′23″N 123°20′49″W	Grayback Mountain	1150521
Sun Notch	7,139 ft (2,176 m)	42°54′09″N 122°05′49″W	Crater Lake East	1154335
Sun Pass	5,426 ft (1,654 m)	42°47′18″N 121°58′41″W	Sun Pass	1150654
Sundown Gap	5,732 ft (1,747 m)	42°00′29″N 123°25′21″W	Oregon Caves	1150658
Tanners Pass	2,897 ft (883 m)	43°11′18″N 122°58′39″W	Red Butte	1150897
Tap Horn Gap	3,478 ft (1,060 m)	44°45′53″N 120°07′45″W	Rowe Creek	1127893
Tenderfoot Pass	8,596 ft (2,620 m)	45°11′25″N 117°12′29″W	Aneroid Mountain	1167125
Tennessee Pass	2,362 ft (720 m)	42°11′41″N 123°41′52″W	Cave Junction	1150981
The Gap	4,111 ft (1,253 m)	42°10′21″N 121°37′15″W	Dairy	1127969
The Gap	3,602 ft (1,098 m)	44°28′26″N 121°30′47″W	Little Akawa Butte	1151013
The Narrows	4,478 ft (1,365 m)	42°20′21″N 119°50′08″W	Crump Lake	1127983
The Narrows	4,344 ft (1,324 m)	43°05′41″N 117°19′55″W	Cow Lakes	1127984
The Narrows	4,101 ft (1,250 m)	43°17′04″N 118°57′52″W	The Narrows	1127985
The Narrows	4,009 ft (1,222 m)	45°16′49″N 118°35′38″W	Bally Mountain	1127986
The Narrows	4,308 ft (1,313 m)	42°36′29″N 120°24′43″W	Tucker Hill	1151027
The Narrows	1,056 ft (322 m)	45°08′32″N 122°05′09″W	Three Lynx	1151028
The Narrows	755 ft (230 m)	43°19′46″N 123°00′49″W	Glide	1162711
The Notch	4,724 ft (1,440 m)	44°57′38″N 119°55′30″W	Wheeler Point	1151030
The Saddle	1,650 ft (500 m)	44°19′54″N 123°26′40″W	Glenbrook	1134169
The Saddle	3,228 ft (984 m)	45°17′44″N 116°47′54″W	Jaynes Ridge	1153014
Tidewater Summit	1,263 ft (385 m)	45°59′36″N 123°36′10″W	Vinemaple	1136830
Tincup Pass	2,467 ft (752 m)	42°21′27″N 123°58′31″W	Tincup Peak	1151268
Toll Road Gap	4,544 ft (1,385 m)	42°04′19″N 122°36′59″W	Siskiyou Pass	1132779
Tombstone Gap	4,521 ft (1,378 m)	42°45′15″N 122°57′08″W	Richter Mountain	1151322
Tombstone Pass	4,219 ft (1,286 m)	44°23′44″N 122°08′28″W	Harter Mountain	1134483
Tompkins Pass	4,065 ft (1,239 m)	44°39′07″N 120°24′32″W	Sandrock Mountain	1128154
Trask Summit	2,198 ft (670 m)	45°19′42″N 123°36′18″W	Dovre Peak	1151403
Trenholm Saddle	751 ft (229 m)	44°23′15″N 123°45′08″W	Hellion Rapids	1151412
Tryon Saddle	4,613 ft (1,406 m)	45°42′27″N 116°35′42″W	Lord Flat	1151464
Tucker Gap	5,282 ft (1,610 m)	42°53′36″N 122°39′02″W	Butler Butte	1151476
Tututni Pass	6,506 ft (1,983 m)	42°52′13″N 122°06′11″W	Maklaks Crater	1151542
Twelvemile Summit	5,456 ft (1,663 m)	42°19′45″N 117°58′37″W	Blue Mountain Basin	1157711
Twomile Gap	3,097 ft (944 m)	44°56′19″N 119°19′10″W	Slickear Mountain	1151620
Tygh Grade Summit	2,713 ft (827 m)	45°19′29″N 121°09′53″W	Postage Stamp Butte	1128393
Upton Pass	4,255 ft (1,297 m)	43°41′32″N 118°18′31″W	Upton Mountain	1128486
Utopian Saddle	3,668 ft (1,118 m)	43°36′39″N 122°40′54″W	Fairview Peak	1153351
Waggoner Gap	3,671 ft (1,119 m)	42°44′26″N 123°10′26″W	King Mountain	1164041
Wagner Gap	4,157 ft (1,267 m)	42°08′21″N 122°48′10″W	Talent	1151800
Wagner Glade Gap	6,480 ft (1,980 m)	42°06′09″N 122°45′49″W	Siskiyou Peak	1151801
Wall Rock	4,026 ft (1,227 m)	43°29′05″N 117°33′03″W	Wall Rock Springs	1128599
Wapinitia Pass	3,937 ft (1,200 m)	45°13′35″N 121°41′51″W	Wapinitia Pass	1151879
Water Gap	1,355 ft (413 m)	42°17′30″N 123°15′44″W	Murphy	1151934
Watson Saddle	4,672 ft (1,424 m)	43°17′12″N 122°17′49″W	Potter Mountain	1134852
Willamette Pass	5,131 ft (1,564 m)	43°36′01″N 122°02′17″W	Willamette Pass	1152382
Wimble Pass	1,421 ft (433 m)	43°54′32″N 122°42′19″W	Fall Creek Lake	1135571
Windigo Pass	5,833 ft (1,778 m)	43°21′52″N 122°02′01″W	Tolo Mountain	1152499
Windy Gap	1,168 ft (356 m)	43°43′33″N 123°20′28″W	Drain	1129222
Windy Gap	4,616 ft (1,407 m)	44°38′19″N 120°47′41″W	Ashwood	1129223
Windy Gap	1,611 ft (491 m)	46°02′17″N 123°13′29″W	Clatskanie	1134552
Windy Gap	6,424 ft (1,958 m)	42°07′07″N 123°18′35″W	Grayback Mountain	1152508
Windy Gap	5,121 ft (1,561 m)	42°55′35″N 122°34′01″W	Abbott Butte	1152509
Windy Gap	5,499 ft (1,676 m)	43°05′58″N 122°25′31″W	Fish Mountain	1152510
Windy Pass	3,720 ft (1,130 m)	43°50′09″N 122°28′29″W	Westfir East	1135777
Windy Pass	5,833 ft (1,778 m)	42°03′17″N 118°24′56″W	Windy Point	1157749
Wolf Gap	3,704 ft (1,129 m)	42°10′41″N 122°55′56″W	Sterling Creek	1152588
Wrangle Gap	6,480 ft (1,980 m)	42°02′58″N 122°50′45″W	Siskiyou Peak	1152654
Yank Gulch Gap	4,626 ft (1,410 m)	42°10′36″N 122°50′12″W	Talent	1134700
Young Gap	3,455 ft (1,053 m)	42°05′57″N 123°13′12″W	Carberry Creek	1152753

== See also ==
- Lists of Oregon-related topics
