= French Pass (disambiguation) =

French Pass (officially Te Aumiti / French Pass) is a strait that separates D'Urville Island from the South Island of New Zealand.

French Pass may also refer to:

- French Pass (Colorado), a mountain pass on the Continental Divide of the Americas
- French Pass (Oregon), a mountain pass in Morrow County, Oregon, United States
- French Pass (Waikato), a small settlement near Cambridge in New Zealand

== See also ==
- French Passage, a passage through the Wilhelm Archipelago, Antarctica
