= Glenwood, Lane County, Oregon =

Unincorporated community in the state of Oregon, United States

Glenwood, Oregon
- Unincorporated community
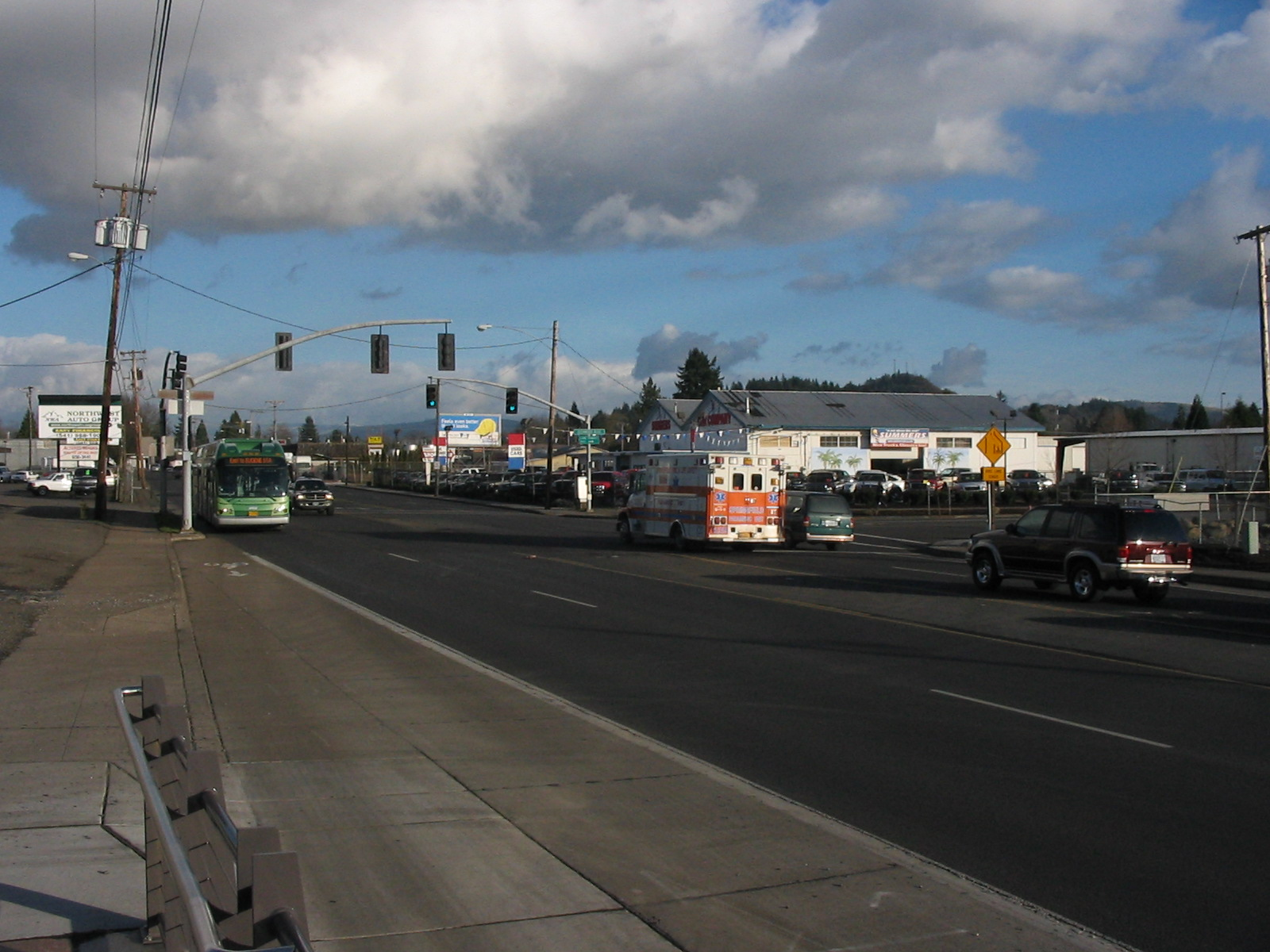
- An EmX bus approaches a station in Glenwood, along Franklin Boulevard.

- Location within Oregon Location within the United States
- Coordinates: 44°2′39.98″N 123°2′1″W
- Country: United States
- State: Oregon
- County: Lane
- Platted: 1888
- Elevation: 440 ft (130 m)
- Time zone: UTC-8 (Pacific (PST))
  - Summer (DST): UTC-7 (PDT)
- ZIP code: 97403
- Area codes: 458 and 541
- GNIS feature ID: 1136321

Glenwood is an unincorporated community in Lane County, Oregon, United States. It is located between the University of Oregon in Eugene and downtown Springfield on Franklin Boulevard, along the former route of the Pacific Highway, now Oregon Route 99. It is a mixed-use industrial and residential area. The unincorporated character of the area has tended to attract "experimental and individualistic" inhabitants. For decades, Glenwood, which has been seen as a blighted area, has been the subject of redevelopment projects and proposals, including a riverfront redevelopment project.

== History ==
Charles B. Sweet was the first settler in Glenwood, filing for a Donation Land Claim in 1851.

Glenwood was platted as Glenwood Park in 1888. Henderson Avenue was the primary north–south corridor for the plat. The Springfield Wagon Road ran west–east near the center of the plat, while a county road (now Franklin Boulevard) ran north of the plat.

The area remained largely undeveloped due to flooding from the Willamette River. The area's location along Pacific Highway and the ability to move cars during flooding made it a good location for auto camps. The auto camps were later replaced with mobile home parks.

In 2004, Glenwood was established as an urban renewal district by the voters of Springfield.

=== African-American history ===
Historically Black residents had trouble buying or renting property in Eugene, so they settled on county land on the north bank of the Willamette River. Glenwood was one of the places outside the Eugene city limits where Black people moved after being evicted from the Ferry Street Settlement tent city near present-day Alton Baker Park due to the construction of a new Ferry Street Bridge in 1948. In 1948, twelve Black families rented small homes or cabins in Glenwood. An area of Glenwood known in 1950 as “Skunk Hollow” had 16 Black residents, many of whom worked for the railroad. Glenwood had a predominantly Black church, which was attended by construction worker Arthur J. Shankle. He became a reverend, and with his wife Luvenia, founded the Bethel Temple, which later purchased the church property. He built a new church there on Brooklyn Street that today is a homeless shelter known as the Shankle Safe Haven. Bethel Temple moved to Eugene in 1995 and continues to hold services.

== Geography ==
The Willamette River borders the area on the north and east. The western and southern borders are defined by Interstate 5 (I-5). Glenwood Slough is a cut off meander of the Willamette River that passes through Glenwood. Augusta Creek, which drains Moon Mountain on the Eugene side of I-5 was historically connected to Glenwood Slough.

== Demographics ==
In 1940, Glenwood's population was 1,800. As of 2006, the population of Glenwood was 1,300. Median income for the area was $23,000 in 2006, compared to $37,000 for the county.

== Economy ==
Glenwood formerly was an agricultural area, with a large bean yard in the 1940s. In the 1940s, Glenwood had three grocery stores, one of which was the second-highest grossing market in Oregon. The market burned down in 1950.

Williams' Bakery relocated to Glenwood after being displaced by the University of Oregon's Matthew Knight Arena.

== Parks and recreation ==
James Park was the first park in the Willamalane Park and Recreation District, created in 1944.

== Government ==
Glenwood is within Springfield's urban growth area. Planning of the area was taken over from Eugene in 1998. The community uses a Eugene postal address and has Springfield phone numbers.

== Education ==
Glenwood School was a four-room grammar school built in 1935 and closed in the 1960s. Today students attend Eugene public schools.

== Infrastructure ==
Glenwood is the site of Glenwood Central Receiving Station municipal solid waste and recycling facility. Materials collected at the receiving station are transported to Short Mountain Landfill for disposal.

Laurel Grove Cemetery, a historic pioneer cemetery with its first burial in 1855, is located on Laurel Hill in the southwestern part of Glenwood. The Laurel Hill neighborhood of Eugene is on the other side of I-5 from Laurel Hill. Among the notable people buried at Laurel Grove are Isaac Briggs, the founder of Springfield, baseball player Howie Fox, Charnel Mulligan, one of the co-founders of Eugene, and members of Opal Whiteley's family.

=== Transportation ===
==== Rail ====
The Union Pacific (UP) Cascade Line (originally the Oregon & California Railroad and later the Southern Pacific) runs through Glenwood. The Springfield Junction wye at MP 621.9 in Glenwood is the point where the UP's Cascade Line and the Siskiyou Line through Siskiyou Pass diverge. The lines do not rejoin again until Black Butte, California at MP 345.

==== Bus ====
Glenwood is served by the Emerald Express (EmX) bus rapid transit service of the Lane Transit District (LTD). LTD's bus barns and offices are located in Glenwood.

== See also ==
- African Americans in Oregon
- Brooklyn Subdivision
- Coryell Pass
- Oregon Route 225 (McVay Highway)
- Pengra Pass rail route
