= Waipā Networks =

New Zealand electricity distribution company

- Industry: Electricity distribution
- Headquarters: Te Awamutu, New Zealand
- Key people: Sean Horgan, CEO
- Owner: Waipā Energy Trust
- Website: waipanetworks.co.nz

Waipā Networks Limited is a New Zealand electricity distribution company, serving Cambridge, Te Awamutu and areas extending to Kawhia, Hauturu, Pukeatua, French Pass and Paterangi. Waipā has about 30,000 connections and is 100% owned by the Waipā Energy Trust.

== History ==
Waipā Networks was formed in 1998 from Waipā Power, which began in 1993 with the merger of Te Awamutu and Cambridge Electric Power Boards.

The Boards were set up under the Electric-power Boards Act 1918, after the Public Works Department bought the 6,300 kW (8,400 hp) Horahora power station on 1 November 1919 for £212,500. Hamilton Chamber of Commerce held a conference to create a Hydro Electric Power Board for the Waikato, on 23 June 1919, but that was rejected and it was agreed to form local boards instead.

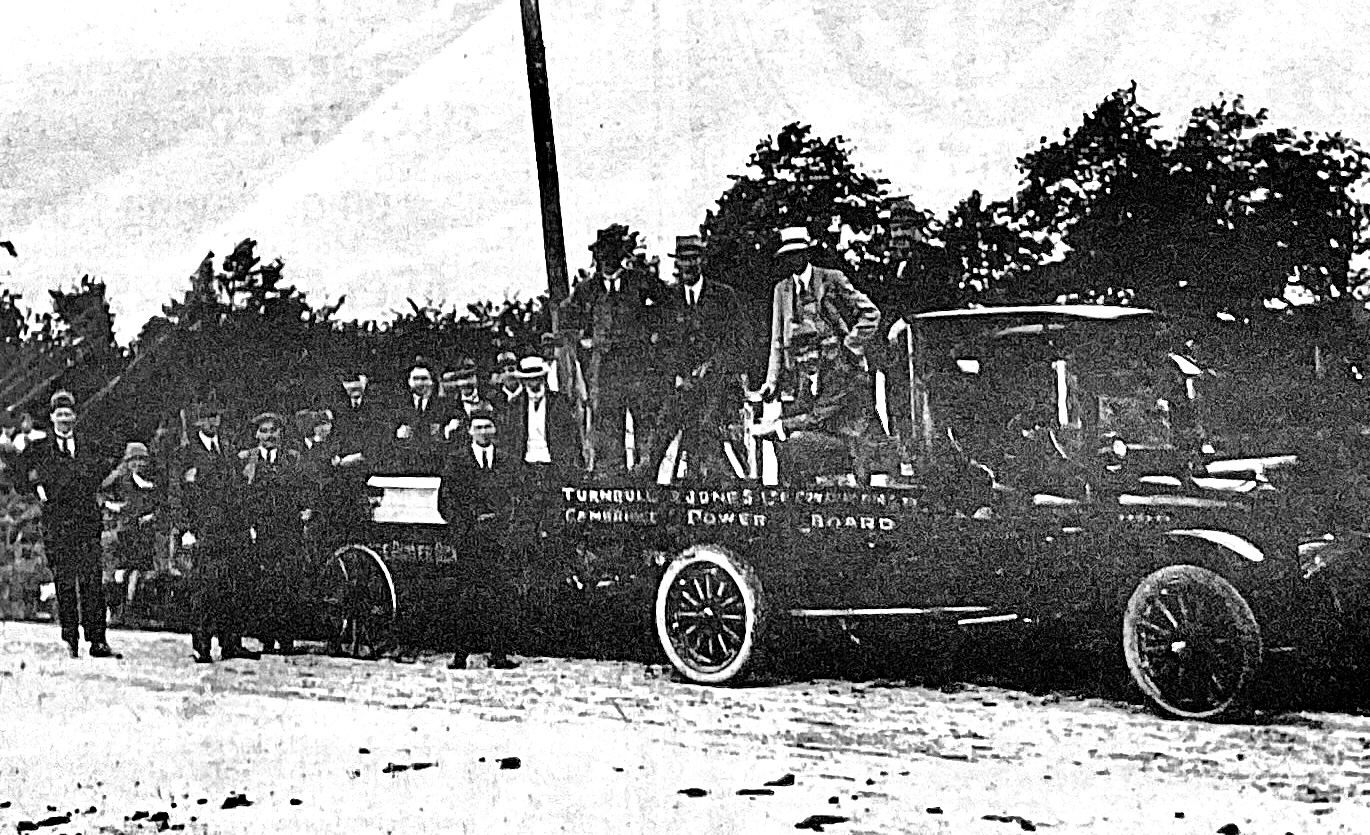
Cambridge Electric Power Board vehicle and staff about 1920

=== Cambridge Electric Power Board ===
Cambridge Power Board initially covered about 100 mi^{2} (260 km^{2}), with 200 hp (150 kW) allocated to the Board.

A provisional committee to form a Board held its first meeting on 1 October 1919. The first Board was elected on 11 February 1920. The first power in the Waikato from Horahora was switched on at Leamington town hall on 28 April 1921, but it took another year to turn on the street lights in Cambridge, as all the other local Boards had taken on staff and put in orders earlier. A 2-storey office opened on Alpha Street in October 1925. The building was renovated in 1992.

=== Te Awamutu Electric Power Board ===
Te Awamutu Power Board was the first in the country to be set up, its first meeting being on 10 February 1920. It initially covered about 300 mi^{2} (780 km^{2}), including Kihikihi, Te Awamutu, Pirongia, Te Rore, and Ōhaupō, with 600 hp (450 kW) allocated to the Board.

No election was held for the first Board, as a campaign had been run to have only one candidate for each area represented and the consensus allowed a 1920 poll, for a £120,000 loan, to be carried without opposition. In Te Awamutu 81 street lights were lit up on 26 August 1921. Kihikihi received power on 6 September, Pirongia on 30 December and Ōhaupō on 15 February 1922. The Board met in several locations, until their concrete office block at 486-488 Alexandra Street was completed in December 1926.

== Network ==
The Waipa Networks distribution network consists of approximately 2,300 km of lines, supplying approximately 28,000 customers. Electricity is supplied from the national grid via grid exit points (GXPs) at Transpower's Cambridge and Te Awamutu substation. Waipa Networks owns a 36 km (22 mi), 110,000-volt transmission line linking Transpower's Te Awamutu and Hangatiki substations, which is operated by Transpower as part of the national grid. The line was commissioned in 2016 to provide a second supply for Te Awamutu, which previously experienced day-long outages every two years while maintenance was carried out on the transmission line from Karapiro.

As of 2024, Waipa Networks doesn't have a subtransmission network; the two GXPs directly feed the 11,000-volt distribution network. 3,672 distribution transformers step the 11,000 volts down to 230/400 volts (phase-to-neutral/phase-to-phase) to supply consumers.

Due to high growth in the Cambridge area and constrained supply at the Cambridge GXP, Transpower and Waipa Networks are building a 220/33 kV substation and grid exit point at Hautapu. The substation will be located next to the Waikato Expressway where Transpower's existing 220,000-volt lines cross it. The grid exit point will initially feed a single co-sited 33/11 kV zone substation, which will supply the distribution network in the rural area west of Cambridge areas and taking load off Cambridge GXP. In future, a 33 kV subtransmission network will expand from Hautapu GXP to feed additional 33/11 kV zone substations around Cambridge. The substations are expected to be completed in December 2024.

Waipā Networks Limited network statistics for the year ending 31 March 2024
Parameter	Value
Regulatory asset base	$172 million
Line charge revenue	$34.9 million
Capital expenditure	$15.9 million
Operating expenditure	$14.8 million
Customer connections	28,972
Energy delivered	434 GWh
Peak demand	88 MW
Total line length	2,341 km
Distribution and low-voltage overhead lines	1,744 km
Distribution and low-voltage underground cables	563 km
Subtransmission lines and cables	33 km
Poles	22,419
Distribution transformers	3,765
Zone substation transformers	0
Average interruption duration (SAIDI)	215 minutes
Average interruption frequency (SAIFI)	1.98
