= Black Butte (Siskiyou County, California) =

Overlapping dacite lava domes in Northern California, United States

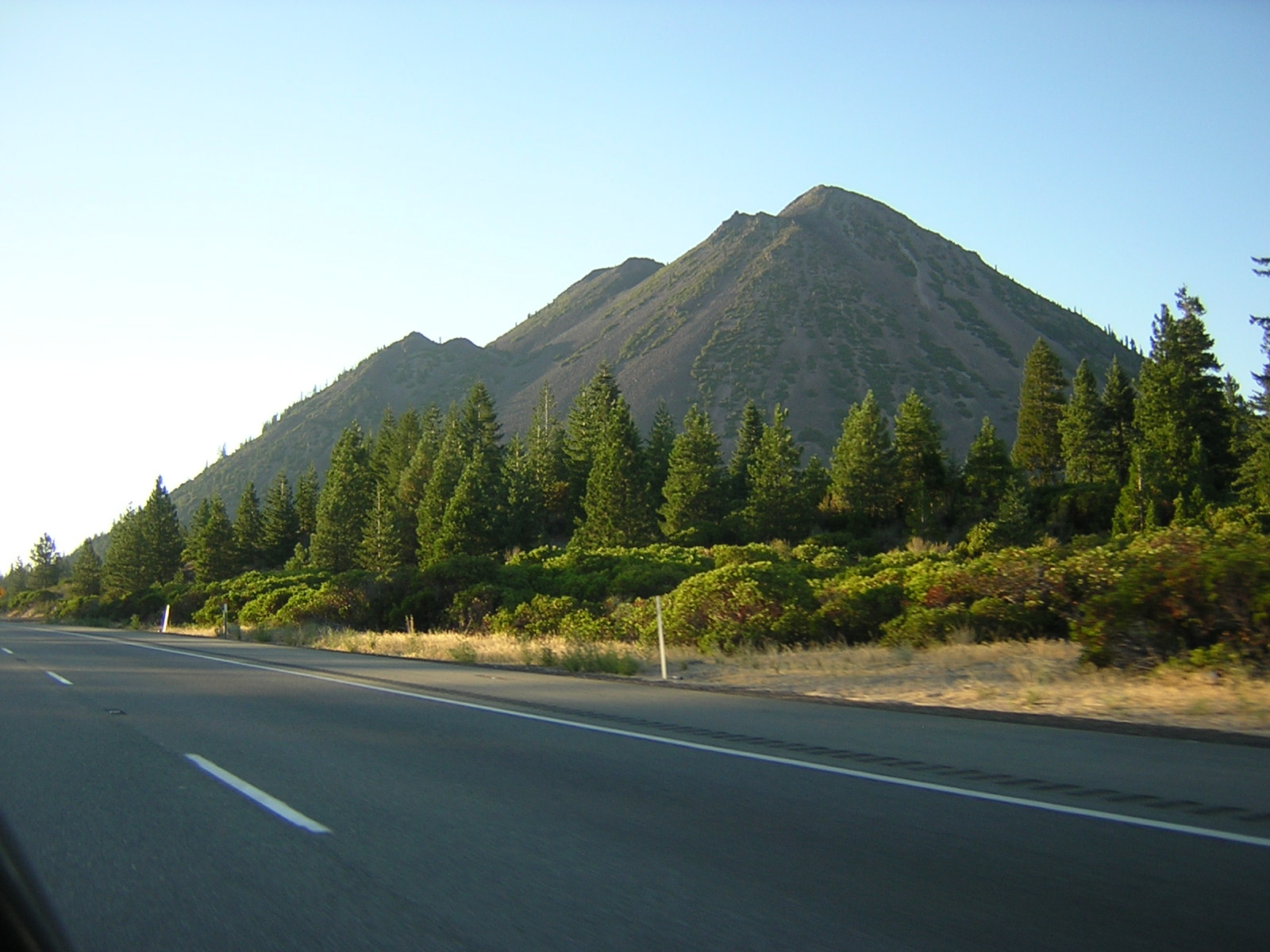
- Black Butte, looking north from Interstate 5

Highest point
- Elevation: 6,334 ft (1,931 m) NAVD 88
- Coordinates: 41°21′59″N 122°20′53″W

Geography
- Location within California
- Location: Siskiyou County, California, U.S.
- Parent range: Cascades
- Topo map: USGS City of Mount Shasta

Geology
- Rock age: Holocene
- Mountain type: Lava dome
- Volcanic arc: Cascade Volcanic Arc
- Last eruption: About 9,500 years ago

Climbing
- Easiest route: Trail

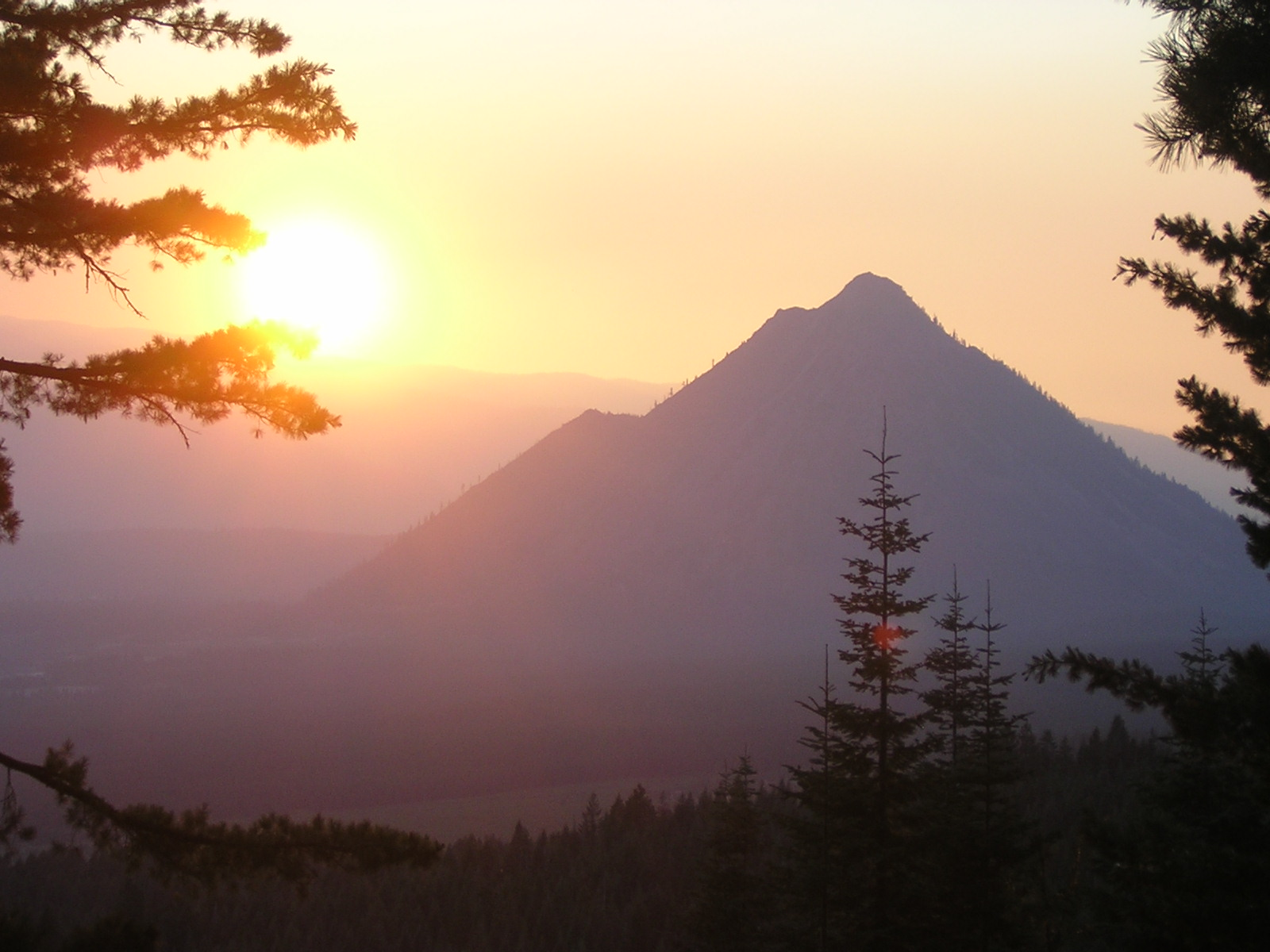
Sunset over Black Butte

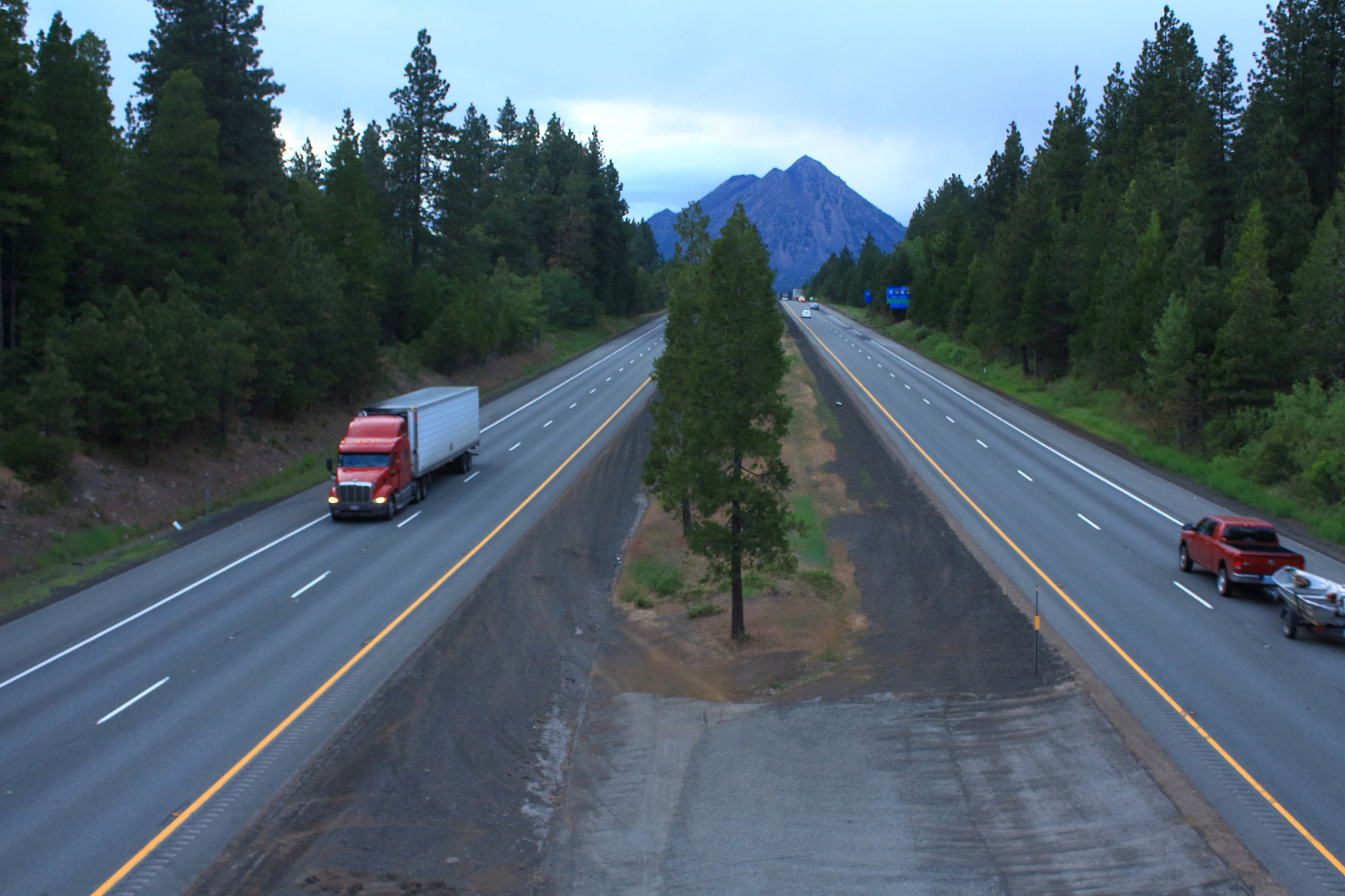
Black Butte seen with I-5 near the city of Mount Shasta

Black Butte (formerly Wintoon Butte, Cone Mountain, Sugar Loaf and Muir's Peak) is a cluster of overlapping dacite lava domes in a butte, a satellite cone of Mount Shasta. It is located directly adjacent to the northbound lanes of Interstate 5 at milepost 742 between the cities of Mount Shasta and Weed, California. The I-5 freeway crosses a 3,912 ft (1,192 m) pass, Black Butte Summit, at the western base of the lava domes. The lava domes were extruded at the foot of the cone of Shastina following the period of its major eruptions about 9,000–10,000 years ago.

== Climate ==
Climate data for Latitude: 41.3671 Longitude: -122.3498
Month	Jan	Feb	Mar	Apr	May	Jun	Jul	Aug	Sep	Oct	Nov	Dec	Year
Mean daily maximum °F (°C)	36.4 (2.4)	39.6 (4.2)	44.7 (7.1)	51.0 (10.6)	60.1 (15.6)	68.0 (20.0)	77.2 (25.1)	76.3 (24.6)	70.9 (21.6)	56.3 (13.5)	42.1 (5.6)	35.7 (2.1)	54.9 (12.7)
Mean daily minimum °F (°C)	20.2 (−6.6)	21.1 (−6.1)	24.0 (−4.4)	27.1 (−2.7)	33.4 (0.8)	39.2 (4.0)	44.0 (6.7)	42.4 (5.8)	37.2 (2.9)	29.5 (−1.4)	23.9 (−4.5)	19.9 (−6.7)	30.2 (−1.0)
Source: prism

== Summit ==
A United States Forest Service fire lookout tower was built on the summit in the early 1930s, but destroyed during the Columbus Day Storm of 1962. A new lookout was built in 1963 and operated until 1973. The building was moved by helicopter to a new location in 1975 and only the concrete foundation remains today. A 2.5-mile-long (4.0 km) trail leads to the summit from a trailhead accessible by gravel roads off the Everitt Memorial Highway. The summit boasts an outstanding view of the southwest side of Shasta and Shastina, and on clear days Mount McLoughlin is easily visible 70 miles (113 km) to the north in Oregon. Lassen Peak is visible around 80 miles (129 km) to the south.

== Train station ==
From 1887 to 1911, Black Butte Summit was the name of a station on the Southern Pacific (SP) Siskiyou Line near Summit Lake, about a mile south of Black Butte. In 1924–1926, the Natron Cutoff was built by SP as an alternative to the steep Siskiyou route and a small rail yard, wye, and train orders office were built at the present site of Black Butte on the rerouted line. The station opened on September 1, 1926. In the early 1940s, the station was moved to the opposite side of the tracks and the yard was expanded. The station included a water tank, and housing for the railroad workers; the water tank still exists on the site. SP workers and their families, including railway signal maintenance workers, lived at the station until the early 1970s. The train orders office operated until 1966, when Centralized traffic control (CTC) replaced the train orders operator; the train orders office was destroyed by a derailing freight train on October 31, 1970.

In 1992, the SP suspended operations over its Siskiyou line in favor of the Cascade Line. The Siskiyou Line was leased to Central Oregon and Pacific Railroad (CORP) in 1995 (the line closed again in 2008). The Southern Pacific was taken over by Union Pacific on September 11, 1996.

The Amtrak Coast Starlight derailed at Black Butte on December 7, 2000; one Amtrak engineer was injured.

The Coast Starlight occasionally changes crews at Black Butte instead of the usual location at Klamath Falls, Oregon.

=== Railroad ===
The Black Butte Subdivision of the UP starts in Klamath Falls and ends in Dunsmuir, California.

The Springfield Junction wye at MP 621.9 in Glenwood, Oregon is the point where the UP's Cascade Line and Siskiyou Line through Siskiyou Pass diverge. The lines do not rejoin again until Black Butte at MP 345.

Black Butte is the site of the Black Butte Center for Railroad Culture.

== See also ==
- Volcanic Legacy Scenic Byway
