= Glenwood, Oregon =

Glenwood, Oregon refers to the name of three different unincorporated communities in the U.S. state of Oregon. They are:

- Glenwood, Clatsop County, Oregon, a historic locale
- Glenwood, Lane County, Oregon, a populated place
- Glenwood, Washington County, Oregon, a populated place
