= DeAutremont Brothers =

American criminal gang

- Ray, Hugh, Roy DeAutremont
- Founded: October 11, 1923
- Founded by: Ray, Roy and Hugh DeAutremont
- Founding location: Oregon
- Years active: 1923
- Territory: Pacific Northwest
- Criminal activities: Train robbery, murder

The DeAutremont Brothers, Roy (March 30, 1900 – June 17, 1983), Ray (March 30, 1900 – December 20, 1984) and Hugh DeAutremont (February 21, 1904 – March 30, 1959), were a criminal gang based in the Pacific Northwest during the 1920s. Their unsuccessful robbery of a Southern Pacific Railroad express train and the murder of four crew members, known as the Siskiyou massacre, was subject to one of the largest and most extensive investigations in the region.

The brothers were eventually identified with the assistance of forensic scientist Edward Heinrich, and they were captured after a four-year nationwide manhunt.

The Siskiyou massacre became the subject of the Mark Knopfler song, "Tunnel 13", on the 2024 album One Deep River.

== Early lives ==
Twin brothers Ray and Roy DeAutremont were born March 30, 1900, in Iowa, and their younger brother Hugh was born on February 21, 1904, in Arkansas. They were the sons of Paul P. DeAutremont, who was of French descent, and Isabella Bertha (née Wombacher), who was of German descent. Their father ran a barber shop in Albany, Oregon, and all three brothers worked as lumberjacks. Ray was involved in the emerging labor union movement and the Industrial Workers of the World during his youth. He was sent to a reformatory in Monroe, Washington, in 1919 for his affiliation with the Industrial Workers of the World (IWW or "Wobblies") and spent nearly a year there.

When Hugh graduated from high school in New Mexico in June 1923, he joined his brothers in a logging camp near Silverton, Oregon.

== Train robbery ==
The three DeAutremont brothers worked in Silverton for four months until October 11, 1923, when they attempted to rob Southern Pacific Railroad Train No. 13, which ran from Portland to San Francisco ("San Francisco Express") which traveled south through the Siskiyou Mountains (which span northwestern California and southwestern Oregon). Normal safety procedures called for slowing the train at the top of the Siskiyou Pass, elevation 4122 feet, to test its brakes before the steep descent into California.

The express train was only a few miles from the Siskiyou station (milepost 412.2) when they boarded the train, waiting for the steam locomotive No. 3626 to arrive. Roy and Hugh climbed aboard the locomotive tender, and forced the engineer Sidney Bates to stop the train while most of it was still inside the 3,108-ft. tunnel (No. 13). Ray waited on the ground near the tunnel portal with the dynamite. The brothers were armed with sawed-off shotguns, and while Roy watched the engineer, Ray and Hugh went ahead to the baggage-mail car (O&C No. 5037, Pullman Class 60-BP-30-1), which they thought was carrying an estimated $40,000. When postal clerk Elvyn Dougherty saw the two approach the mail car, he closed the door and Hugh fired his shotgun twice. Ray then attached a dynamite charge, with all of the dynamite they had stolen, to the mail car's door and ran for cover with his brothers. Roy DeAutremont described what happened in a sworn statement years later,

Roy gave the detonator a push and the mouth of the tunnel was rocked by a tremendous explosion. It was far stronger than we had planned. In fact, the blast was so severe that the mail clerk was blown to bits. I then took the fireman and started back down the track to uncouple the mail car. But the gassy and smoky air was too thick so I called for the fireman. The fireman and engineer were then marched to the car. In a few seconds I saw someone coming with a red lantern from the passenger cars still in the tunnel. I shot at the man, who was a conductor, with my shotgun and at the same time Hugh shot him with his .45 Colt. The man staggered and I could see he was dying. Hugh walked over to him and shot him again, in cold blood. The engineer was put back into the cab and Hugh told him to pull the main car up ahead. He attempted to do this a number of times, but the engine wheels merely spun and the cars failed to move. Hugh then put the engineer back on the ground side next to the fireman while Ray and I looked the thing over to see what could be done about uncoupling the mail car and engine. But there was nothing we could do. So we walked back to the mail car and entered through the blown out front end. Our flashlights could not cut the steam and smoke so we left the mail car. Hugh in the meantime had ordered the engineer back into the cab. The fireman was standing alongside the engine with his arms in the air. Ray and I had a brief consultation as to what we should do. We decided to kill the fireman. Ray shot him twice with the Colt. Hugh had the engineer covered and I shouted at him to bump him off and then we would clear out. We didn't want any witnesses. Hugh quickly shot the man in the head with his shotgun. We then fled to our cache which was between two and three miles northeast of the south entrance of the tunnel.

The brothers were then forced to flee empty-handed while a second conductor ran to a nearby emergency phone and reported the robbery to authorities in Ashland, Oregon. The bodies of the four victims were found at the scene of the crime: Engineer Bates and fireman Marvin Seng were beside the engine cab-each had been shot in the head; Train passenger/railroad brakeman Coyle O. Johnson was shot four times in the stomach and died from his wounds; the charred body of mail clerk Dougherty was in the mail car. Police investigators later found a detonator and a discarded .45 caliber pistol at the scene along with three gunny sacks which had been soaked in creosote and dragged along the ground to throw bloodhounds off their trail. The search party fanned out from Tunnel 13 and discovered a black traveling bag with a railroad shipping tag and a pair of green overalls. Over a dozen suspects were jailed and questioned, but local authorities made little headway in solving the case.

Dr. Edward Heinrich, a chemistry professor at the University of California, was brought in and was able to use early forensic methods to accurately provide a description of the suspects for police. Upon examining the green overalls found by investigators, Heinrich reported that the suspect was a left-handed lumberjack, approximately 25 years old, with brown hair and fair complexion, was 5'8 in height and weighed 165 pounds, and was described as a man with fastidious habits. He further explained his findings were based on specific evidence gathered by his investigation of the overalls, which included strands of hair and the presence of Douglas fir needles and fresh pitch from pine trees. The overalls were worn only on the right side, suggesting the same position a left-hander would take if he were to lean against a tree while swinging an ax. The suspect's height and weight were estimated from the size of the overalls, and the "fastidious habits" were evidenced by some neatly-cut fingernail clippings found in the pocket. In addition, the receipt for a registered letter was found in the pocket, which police later traced to a $50 money order sent by Roy DeAutremont to his brother Hugh in Lakewood, New Mexico, on September 14, 1923.

Investigators then questioned Paul DeAutremont, who confirmed that all three sons were lumberjacks and that Roy was left-handed. The .45 Colt weapon found at the crime scene was traced to William Elliott, whose handwriting matched that of Roy DeAutremont, and the railroad express tags found on the suitcase revealed that Roy had mailed it to himself from Eugene to Portland on January 21 of that year. Although there was enough evidence to identify the DeAutremont brothers as the most likely suspects, apprehending them was another matter. All three had disappeared since the incident. The federal government offered a $6,000 reward for their capture with another $7,000 added by Southern Pacific and $900 from the Railway Express Company. News of the Siskiyou massacre had attracted national attention by this time, and investigators received reports of numerous sightings, followed every one of these new leads.

None of these leads ever panned out. The U.S. government eventually issued 2,265,000 wanted posters printed in English and five other languages, which were then distributed internationally.

== Arrests and convictions ==
After several months with no new leads, investigators were on the verge of giving up. However, a corporal named Thomas Reynolds came forward and identified Hugh DeAutremont as James Price, who had been an acquaintance of his while serving with the United States Army in the Philippines. He had only recently been stationed on Alcatraz Island in San Francisco, California, when he recognized DeAutremont from a wanted poster and reported this to his superior officers. Hugh DeAutremont was arrested within six hours, and while admitting his true identity in custody, he was able to stall his extradition to the United States until March 1927. Once back in the United States, Hugh DeAutremont was tried and convicted of first degree murder.

Hugh DeAutremont denied knowledge of his brothers' whereabouts, but his capture encouraged federal authorities to redistribute new wanted posters. Within two months, a report was received that Ray and Roy DeAutremont had been seen in Portsmouth, Ohio, and were discovered to be living in nearby Steubenville under the assumed names of Clarence and Elmer Goodwin. They were arrested by FBI agents on June 8, 1927, and offered no resistance.

The twin brothers later claimed they had fled to Detroit after the robbery. Ray had married while in Detroit and moved to Hanging Rock, with his brother following him several months later. They kept on the move, living in both Portsmouth and Steubenville, before they were recognized when the new wanted posters were issued. Ray had previously bleached his hair but this failed to disguise him.

The two were quickly extradited to Jackson County, Oregon, where they stood trial for their role in the Siskiyou massacre. Their arrival coincided with Hugh's murder trial, although this fact was withheld from the defendant. Hugh was convicted of first degree murder, even though jurors recommended leniency and Roy and Ray DeAutremont both pleaded guilty to the same charges. All three were sentenced to life imprisonment at the Oregon State Penitentiary in Salem.

== Later years and deaths ==
Hugh DeAutremont was paroled in 1958. He moved to San Francisco where he worked as a printer. He was diagnosed with stomach cancer three months after his release and died on March 30, 1959.

Roy DeAutremont was diagnosed with schizophrenia in 1949 and was transferred to the Oregon State Hospital in Salem. He later underwent a frontal lobotomy which left him unable to care for himself. In 1979, he was transferred to a Salem nursing home where he received 24-hour care. Roy was granted parole in March 1983. He died at the nursing home where he had resided since 1979 on June 17, 1983, at the age of 83.

Ray DeAutremont was the last of the brothers to be released from prison, on October 27, 1961. He was questioned by reporters while leaving the prison, and when asked how it felt to be released, he replied, "I'm trying to think of something to say. Well you can imagine how it feels, can't you? But one thing is for sure: For the rest of my life I will struggle with the question of whatever possessed us to do such a thing?" After his release, Ray lived in Eugene, Oregon, where he worked as a janitor on the weekends at the University of Oregon. He also spent his time painting and studying French and Spanish. In 1972, then-governor Tom McCall commuted Ray's sentence after he requested "to be a free man before I die". Ray DeAutremont died in a Eugene nursing home on December 20, 1984, at the age of 84.

All three DeAutremont brothers are buried next to their mother in Belcrest Memorial Cemetery in Salem, Oregon.
