= Edward O. Heinrich =

American forensic criminologist

- Born: April 20, 1881; Clintonville, Wisconsin, US
- Died: September 28, 1953 (aged 72)
- Education: University of California, Berkeley
- Occupations: Criminologist; engineer; lecturer
- Spouse: Marion Allen
- Children: 2

Edward Oscar Heinrich (April 20, 1881 – September 28, 1953) was a forensic criminologist and lecturer at the University of California, Berkeley. During his 40-year career, Heinrich, often referred to as "America's Sherlock Holmes", invented new forensic techniques, opened the nation's first private crime lab and solved 2000 cases.

== Early life ==
Edward Oscar Heinrich was born on April 20, 1881, in Clintonville, Wisconsin. to August and Albertine Heinrich, natives of Germany. He was the youngest of three children. Heirich's father moved the family to Tacoma, Washington in 1890 to find better working opportunities. In 1897, when Heinrich was sixteen years old, his father committed suicide and Heinrich assumed responsibility for supporting his family. He studied to become a pharmacist and worked as a pharmacist assistant. He passed the state pharmacy exams when he was eighteen years old. He later applied to and was accepted to the Chemical Engineering program at the University of California, Berkeley.

== Early career ==
After graduating from Berkeley, Heinrich first worked as a chemical and sanitation engineer for the city of Tacoma. He later was awarded the position of city chemist, which required him to work with the city coroner.

Heinrich and August Vollmer, Berkeley's police chief, met through mutual friends and their interest in forensics. In 1916, Vollmer asked Heinrich to create a college program for police officers at Berkeley. The three-year program became the School for Police at Berkeley, and was the first in the country. They would go on to work together for many years.

== Career ==
During his long career, the media referred to Heinrich as "America's Sherlock Holmes". He invented new forensic techniques, and opened the nation's first private crime lab in 1910. He solved 2000 cases in his 40-year career.

=== The Great Train Heist ===
On October 11, 1923, the three DeAutremont brothers attempted, but failed to rob the mail car of a Southern Pacific train. Instead, they ended up blowing it up completely and murdering four people. The case was solved and the suspects apprehended through the pioneering work of Heinrich.

=== Colwell murder case ===
On Dec. 19, 1925, John McCarty was gunned down by a disgruntled employee, Martin Colwell. The case was proved using a new forensic analysis developed by Heinrich utilizing "bullet fingerprints", microscopic evidence that the bullet which killed McCarty could only have been fired from Colwell's .38 revolver.

In 1930, Heinrich was hired to investigate the Moormeister murder. He was unable to solve it, but did accept his payday.

== Personal life ==
Heinrich met his wife, Marion Allen, when they were both college students at the Berkeley. They married after he graduated from the university in 1908. They later had two sons, Theodore and Mortimer. Heinrich died on September 28, 1953.

== Sources ==
- Winkler Dawson, Kate (2021). American Sherlock: Murder, Forensics, and the Birth of American CSI. G.P. Putnam's Sons. ISBN 978-0525539568.
