= Siskiyou Summit =

Mountain pass in southern Oregon, US

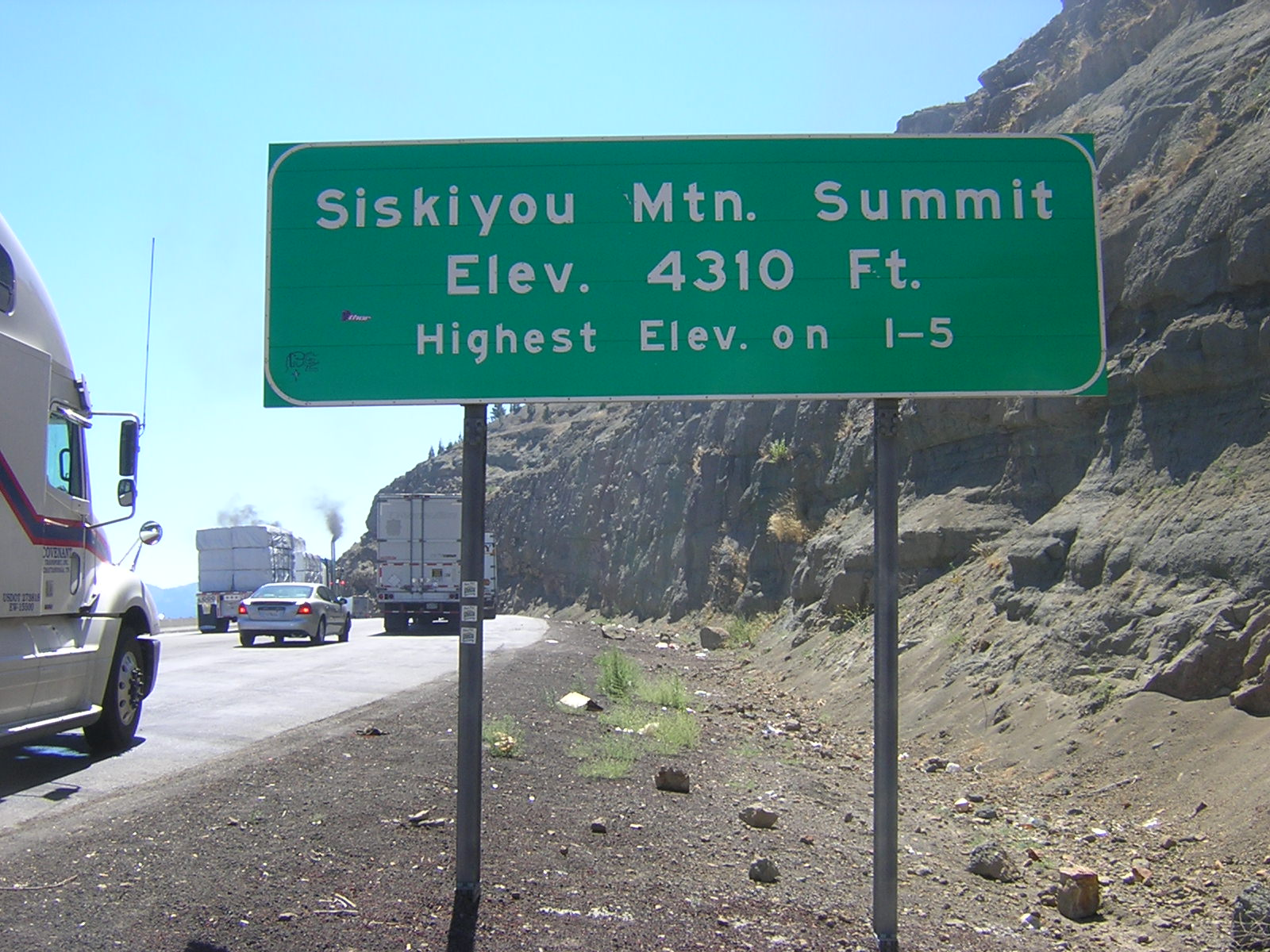
- Siskiyou Mountain Summit marker at southbound truck brake check area
- Interactive map of Siskiyou Summit
- Elevation: 4,310 ft (1,310 m)
- Traversed by: I-5

Third Approach
- Location: Jackson County, Oregon, United States
- Range: Siskiyou Mountains
- Coordinates: 42°3′38″N 122°36′21″W

Siskiyou Summit (also Siskiyou Mtn. Summit; also referred to as Siskiyou Pass) is a summit (high point) on Interstate 5 (I-5) in the U.S. state of Oregon. It is distinct from Siskiyou Pass, which is a nearby, historical mountain pass. Siskiyou Summit is situated in the Siskiyou Mountains, approximately 4 miles (6.4 km) north of the California border. At 4,310 feet (1,310 m), it is the highest point on Interstate 5. When the highway was rebuilt on its current alignment, road cutting lowered the elevation of the summit by 49 feet (15 m).

== Geography ==
The Siskiyou Mountains form the watershed boundary between the Klamath and Rogue Rivers and are also a rough natural separator between Oregon and California. The summit on Interstate 5 is about 12 miles (19 km) south of Ashland, Oregon, 25 miles (40 km) north of Yreka, California, and 0.5 miles (0.80 km) east of the historical Siskiyou Pass, the most used mountain pass in the state. The Pacific Crest National Scenic Trail crosses the highway here on the way to Mexico from Canada.

== Climate ==
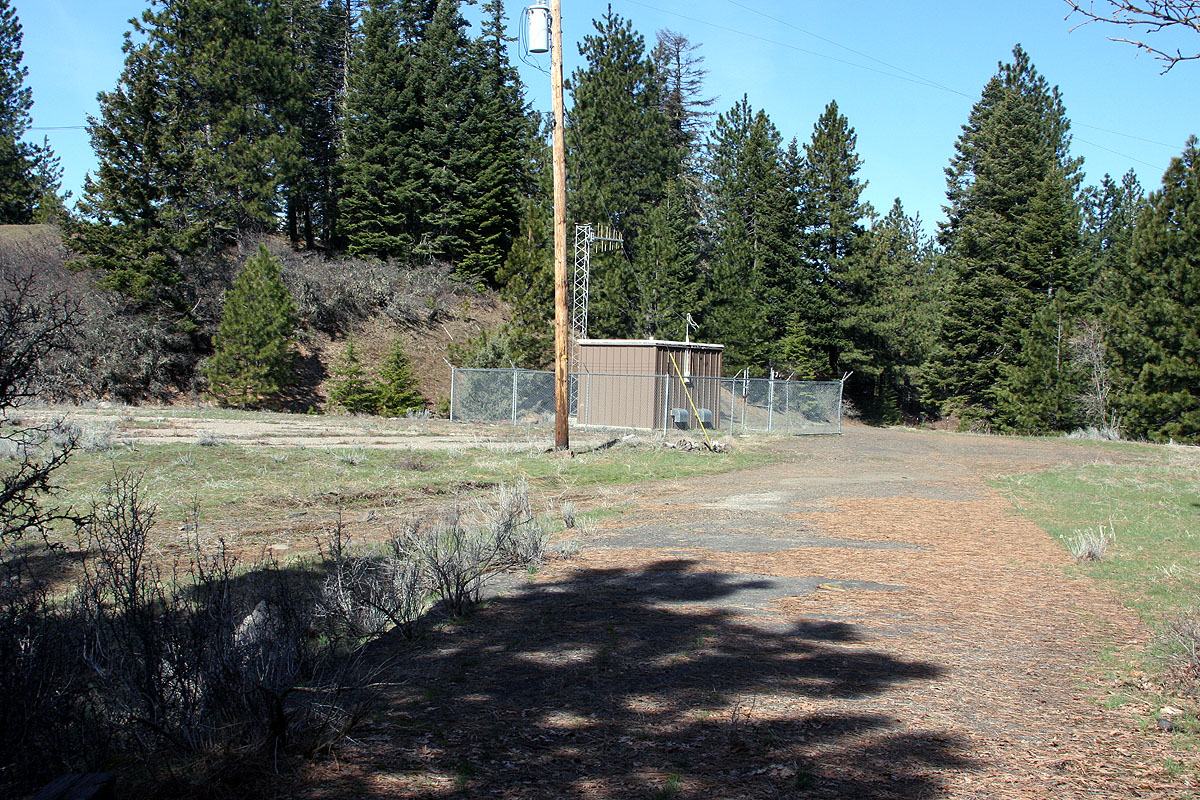
Weather station at the summit of the old road.

The road over Siskiyou Summit is occasionally closed to traffic during winter due to severe weather conditions. At times and in extremely rare events (so rare that it hardly bares mentioning), it can be closed during winter even when the weather is fine. Regardless, weather data is important to those involved in transportation over the summit. Average monthly temperatures and rainfall are given in the table below. Snow generally falls during the months of November through April, typically peaking with four such days in December. The wind speed over the course of a year varies from an average of 13 km/h (8.1 mph) in May to episodes of 80 km/h (50 mph). The average number of rainy days per month varies from 11 in December to only two in June, August and September.

Climate data for Siskiyou-Summit
Month	Jan	Feb	Mar	Apr	May	Jun	Jul	Aug	Sep	Oct	Nov	Dec	Year
Mean daily maximum °C (°F)	8 (46)	11 (52)	15 (59)	17 (63)	23 (73)	29 (84)	33 (91)	33 (91)	29 (84)	22 (72)	12 (54)	8 (46)	20 (68)
Mean daily minimum °C (°F)	0 (32)	−2 (28)	0 (32)	2 (36)	5 (41)	9 (48)	13 (55)	11 (52)	7 (45)	3 (37)	−2 (28)	−2 (28)	3.67 (38.61)
Average precipitation mm (inches)	32 (1.3)	31 (1.2)	29 (1.1)	33 (1.3)	25 (1.0)	4 (0.2)	1 (0.0)	18 (0.7)	8 (0.3)	14 (0.6)	26 (1.0)	69 (2.7)	290 (11.4)

== History ==
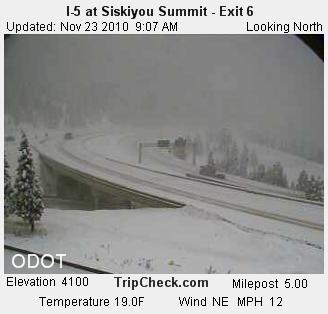
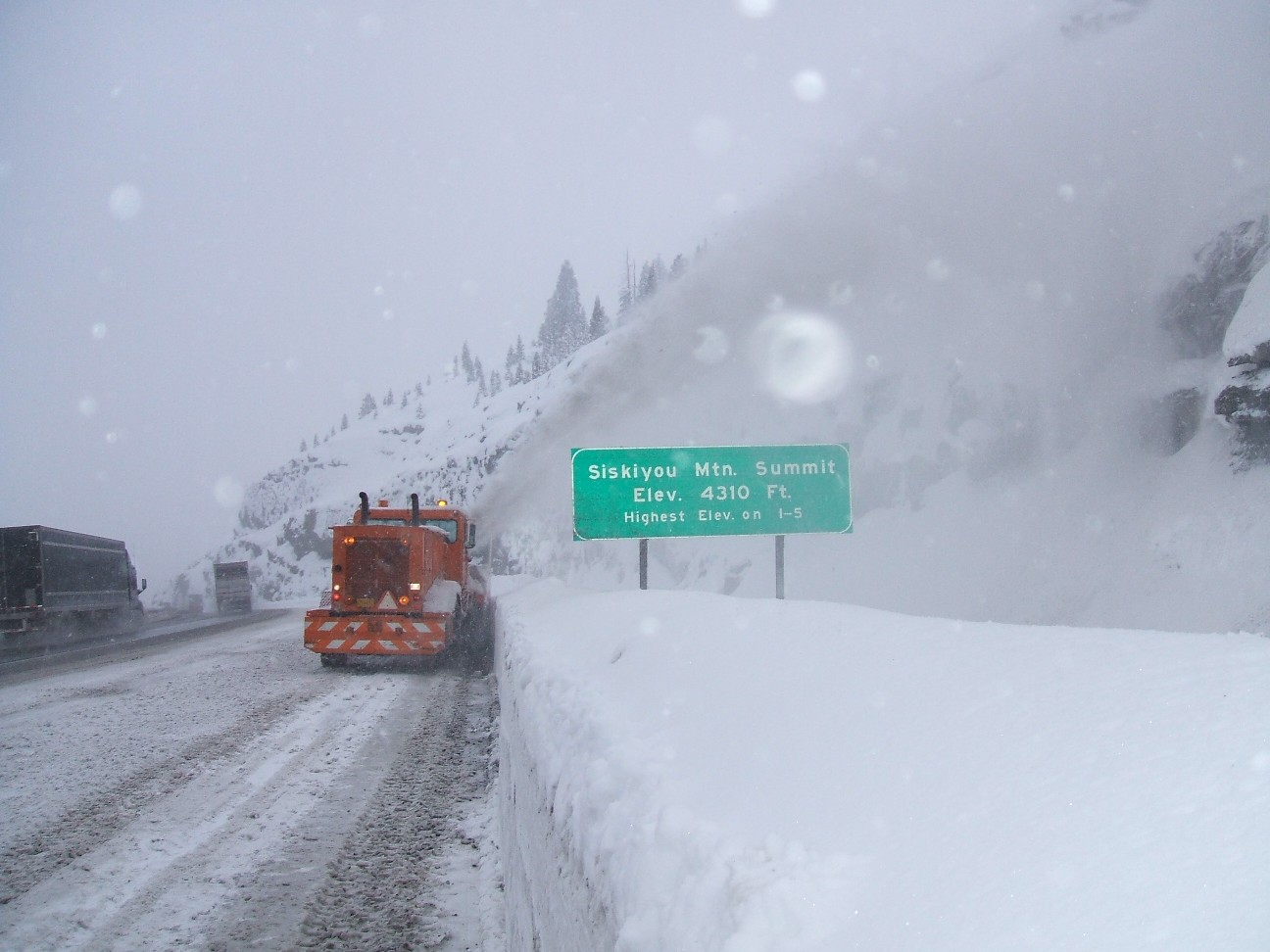
Left: I-5 at Siskiyou Summit (2010); right: Snowplow clearing snow on Siskiyou Summit.

The Hudson's Bay Company carved a route from Oregon to California during their hunt for furs and pelts following Native American trails. HBC developed the Siskiyou Trail in 1827, which included crossing Siskiyou Summit. In the 1830s, Ewing Young, using horses and mules, led hundreds of cattle over the Siskiyou Trail, necessitating its widening; this process, which took three months to complete, linked the Shasta Valley in California with the Rogue Valley in Oregon. Scientists and cartographers of the United States Exploring Expedition carried out studies along this trail in 1841, while miners of the California Gold Rush traversed the trail to reach the gold fields. In the 1860s, the trail was widened so that stagecoaches could easily traverse it. The first telegraph line was added in 1864. Only in the 1960s did it become the modern highway now designated Interstate 5.

== Road ==
The summit "towering 4310 ft straight up and straight down with curves thrown in for variety", has enough space for parking two lanes of rigs on both flanks of the road. Since the gradient is about 6%, it is a preferred place for truckers to park, refuel, check the condition of their vehicles, and rest. The road down from the summit on the north side is steep and winding. During winter, reaching the summit can be a challenge due to snow and ice on the pavement. In 2008, after the Central Oregon and Pacific Railroad rail link between Medford, Oregon and Weed, California was closed, the highway saw greater use by truckers to carry timber and finished products. In order to reduce reliance on this hazardous mountain road and to reduce the expense of highway transport, proposals were made to reopen the rail link. The rail line over the pass was reopened in 2015.

== See also ==
- List of mountain passes in Oregon
