= Long Creek Mountain Summit =

Mountain pass in Oregon, United States

- Interactive map of Long Creek Mountain Summit
- Elevation: 5,075 ft (1,547 m)
- Traversed by: US 395

Third Approach
- Location: Grant County, Oregon, United States
- Range: 10 S,30 E, Willamette Meridian
- Coordinates: 44°40′50″N 119°07′52″W

Long Creek Mountain Summit is a mountain pass in Oregon traversed by U.S. Route 395.
