= List of exits on Interstate 5 =

The list of exits on Interstate 5 has been divided by state:

- Interstate 5 in Washington#Exit list
- Interstate 5 in Oregon#Exit list
- Interstate 5 in California#Exit list
