= Blue Mountain Pass =

Mountain pass in southeastern Oregon, United States

- Interactive map of Blue Mountain Pass
- Elevation: 5,285 ft (1,611 m)
- Traversed by: US 95

Third Approach
- Location: Malheur County, Oregon, United States
- Coordinates: 42.3182177°N 117.8220875°W

Blue Mountain Pass is a high mountain pass in Oregon, United States. It is traversed by U.S. Highway 95. It is located on The Great Basin Divide, separating the watersheds of the Quinn River & Owyhee River. It gets its name from Blue Mountain (elevation 7435), which is just west of the pass. Blue Mountain and Blue Mountain Pass are located in south eastern Oregon, approximately 25 miles north of the Nevada border. They are not a part of the similarly named Blue Mountains of north eastern Oregon.
