= Siskiyou Pass =

Historic mountain pass in Oregon, United States

Coordinates: 42°03′01″N 122°36′10″W

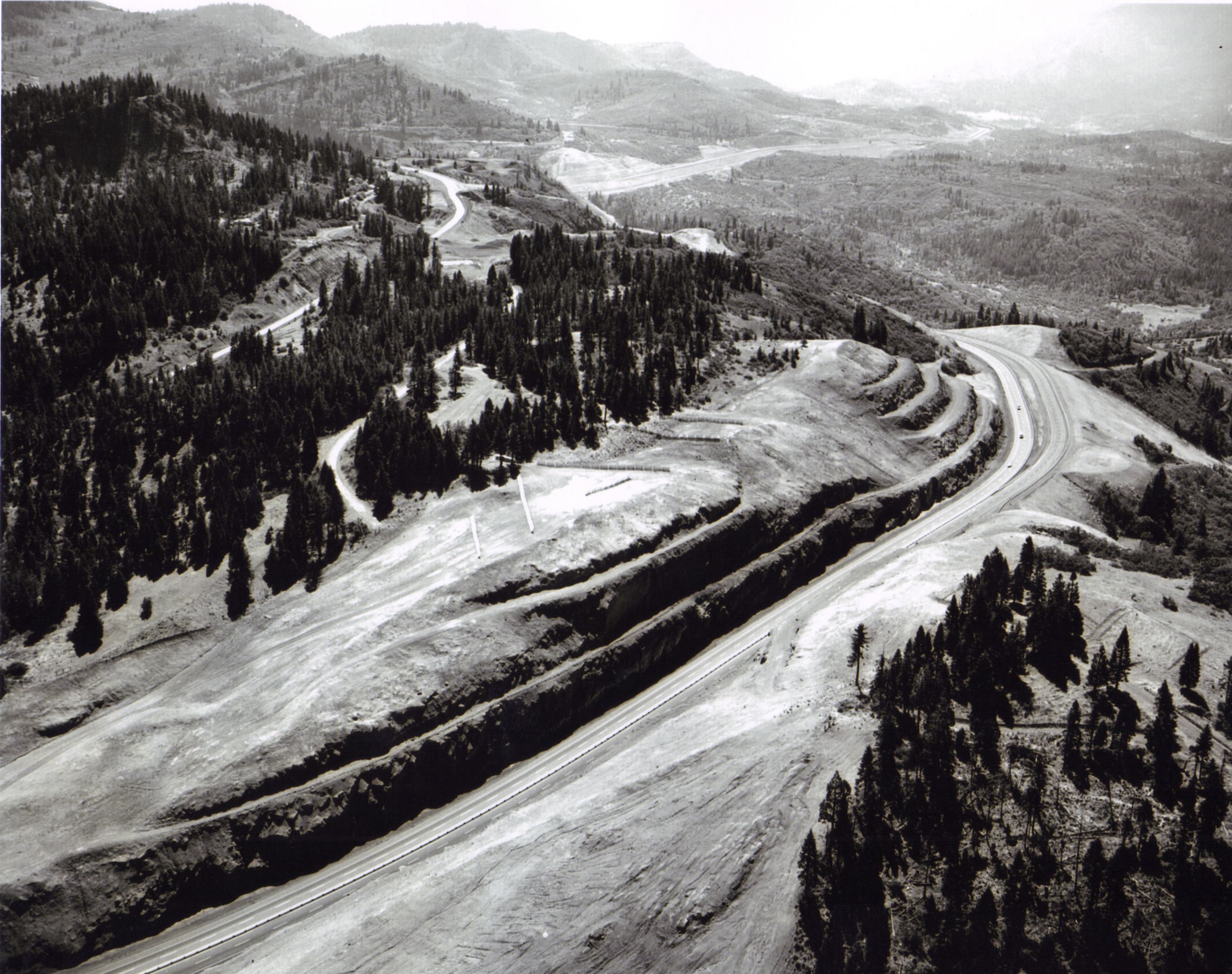
Aerial view of the pass, with Interstate 5 in the foreground/Old U.S. Route 99 in the background (1966)

Siskiyou Pass is on Oregon Route 273 ("Old Highway 99") just east of Siskiyou Summit on the southern end of Interstate 5 in Oregon (the "Pacific Highway").

Siskiyou Pass (sometimes called Siskiyou Summit) is a historic mountain pass in the Siskiyou Mountains of Jackson County in the U.S. state of Oregon. It is the most used pass in Oregon. The Hudson's Bay Company (HBC) made the Siskiyou Trail over the pass before pioneers traversed it with their wagons, while still later it evolved into a stage road, a railroad line, and a highway route. The name Siskiyou is believed to be derived from Cree, meaning "bob-tailed horse". Siskiyou Pass is west of the summit (high point) of Interstate 5, which is known as Siskiyou Summit (though sometimes it is referred to as "Siskiyou Pass").

== Geography ==
The pass is situated in Jackson County on the road and rail transport link between Oregon and California. It measures 4,129 feet (1,259 m) above MSL. Situated along Oregon Route 273 (also known as Old Highway 99), it is 5 miles (8.0 km) north of California state boundary, and 0.5 miles (0.80 km) west of the I-5 summit feature, Siskiyou Summit.

"The original pass crosses the divide between the Rogue and Klamath Rivers at a slight topographic notch formed by the geological contact between the older Siskiyou Mountains to the west and the younger volcanic Cascade Range to the east." (Jeffrey M. LaLande, retired, forest archaeologist, Rogue River-Siskiyou National Forest)

To the west, there is a mountain with a "rounded-top" known as the Ogden Hill, which rises to an elevation of 5,837 feet (1,779 m). Pilot Rock is nearby, named for its use as a visual guide for traversing across the pass. Tunnel 13 on the Oregon and California Railroad line, which is now operated by the Central Oregon and Pacific Railroad, summits at Siskiyou Pass.

== History ==
Its historic use as a pass is traced to European Americans who ventured into this region during the late 1820s. The first person noted with crossing this pass was Peter Skene Ogden, an HBC fur trader, who led his group of trappers traveling from south to north in February 1827. The hazards and extreme winter climate was experienced in 1829 when Alexander Roderick McLeod encountered a severe blizzard while traveling from Fort Vancouver via the Rogue Valley. It forced him to turn back from the pass. HBC started using the pass as a trail for wagons in the later part of the nineteenth century and then converted it into a stage road, and eventually to a railroad line. The pass was beset with security issues as local Indian tribes attacked the foreign agencies operating on the route including robbing rail cars. Between the 1890s through 1910s, the motivating force changed to locomotive driven snow plowers to push the ice packs and pave way for traffic to pass that could reduce the time of travel which otherwise used to take months in the initial years of travel. By the 1940s, a guardrail system was implemented along the highway, using short, white posts. It is the most used pass in the state.

== Road ==
The pass contains a hazardous stretch of the road starting from Milepost 18 of northbound I-5, which has a steep slope of 6%, negotiating a height of 2,000 feet (610 m) in a short road length of 6 miles (9.7 km). The descent along this highway is considered the most dangerous, particularly on foggy nights when visibility is almost next to nothing. In spite of the hazards involved, 13,000 trucks ply this route every day. To address emergency situations for drivers, escape ramps have been provided at Mileposts 6.3 and 9.5. An extensive warning system has been devised and put into effect to make truckers be aware of what they are likely to face on this pass. The precautionary measures including chaining truck tires along road shoulders, providing designated inspection sites, as well as avoiding travel during night and early morning hours in winter months. It is also recommended that drivers listen to updated weather information and road conditions on the radio before and during the entire journey through the pass.

== Rail ==
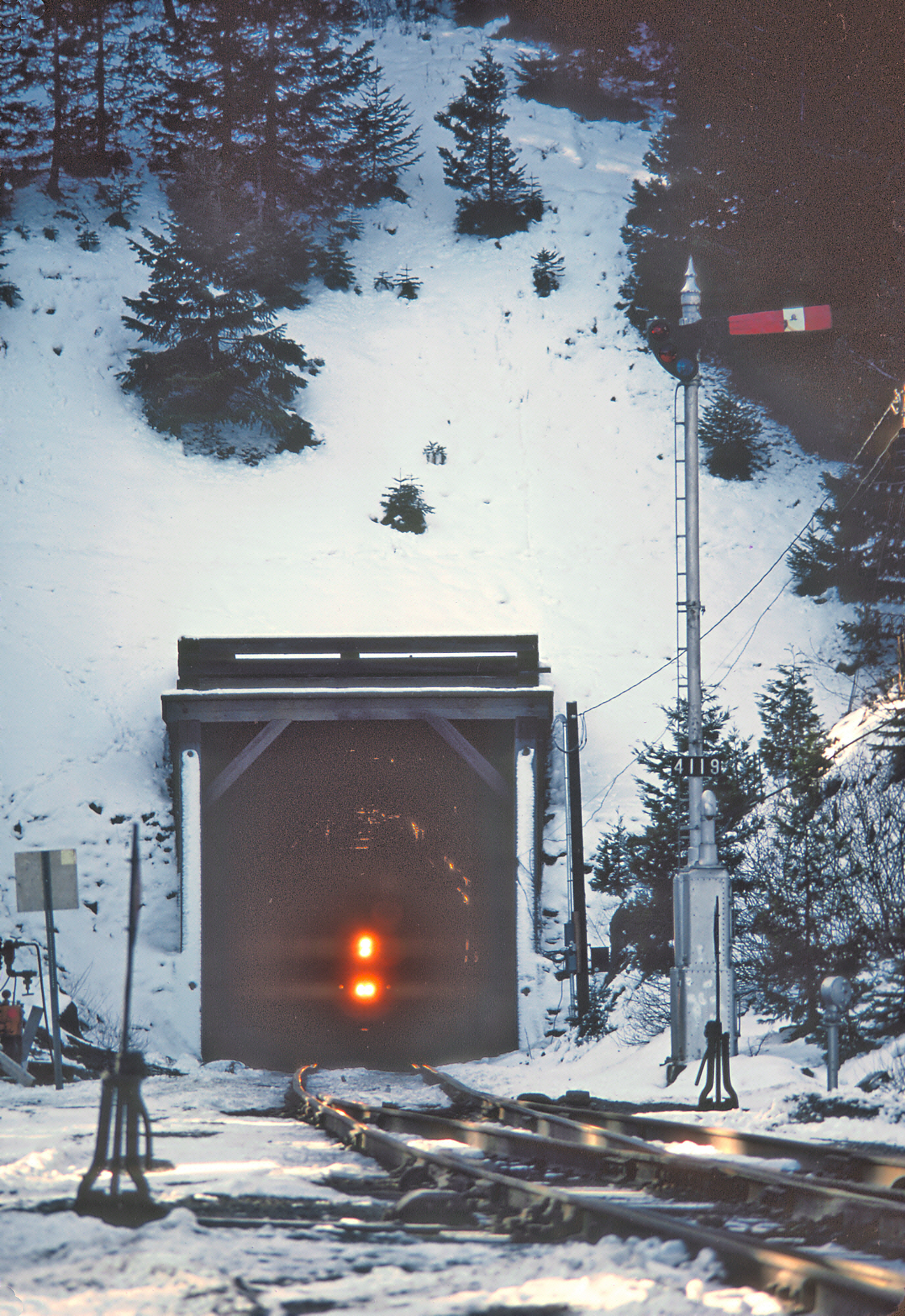
SP train leaving Siskiyou Summit Tunnel (#13); 1979

The Oregon & California Railroad proposed an alternate route for the Oregon and California rail connection, which would have avoided Siskiyou Pass. However, Oregon politicians decided in favor of the present rail route. When Tunnel 13 was completed in 1887, beneath the Siskiyou Pass, there was finally a rail link between Oregon and California.

On October 11, 1923, Tunnel 13 was the site of a botched train robbery by the DeAutremont Brothers, which resulted in the murder of four members of the train crew. The incident became the subject of the song "Tunnel 13" by Mark Knopfler on his 2024 album One Deep River.

In 1926, the Southern Pacific Railroad completed the Natron Cutoff, a faster, cheaper route between the two states.

The rail route is currently owned by the Central Oregon and Pacific Railroad. By 2011, almost ten years had lapsed since trains crossed the pass.

The pass was reopened to rail traffic in 2015, linking Black Butte, California and Eugene, Oregon.

== See also ==
- List of mountain passes in Oregon
