= Abbott Butte =

Mountain in Oregon, United States

Highest point
- Elevation: 6,135 ft (1,870 m)
- Coordinates: 42.9429168°N 122.5489352°W

Geography
- Country: United States
- State: Oregon

Abbott Butte is a summit in the U.S. state of Oregon. The elevation is 6,135 feet (1,870 m).

Abbott Butte was named in 1853 for one Hiram Abbott.
