= Coryell Pass =

Mountain pass in Oregon, United States

Coordinates: 44.0229030°N 123.0273065°W

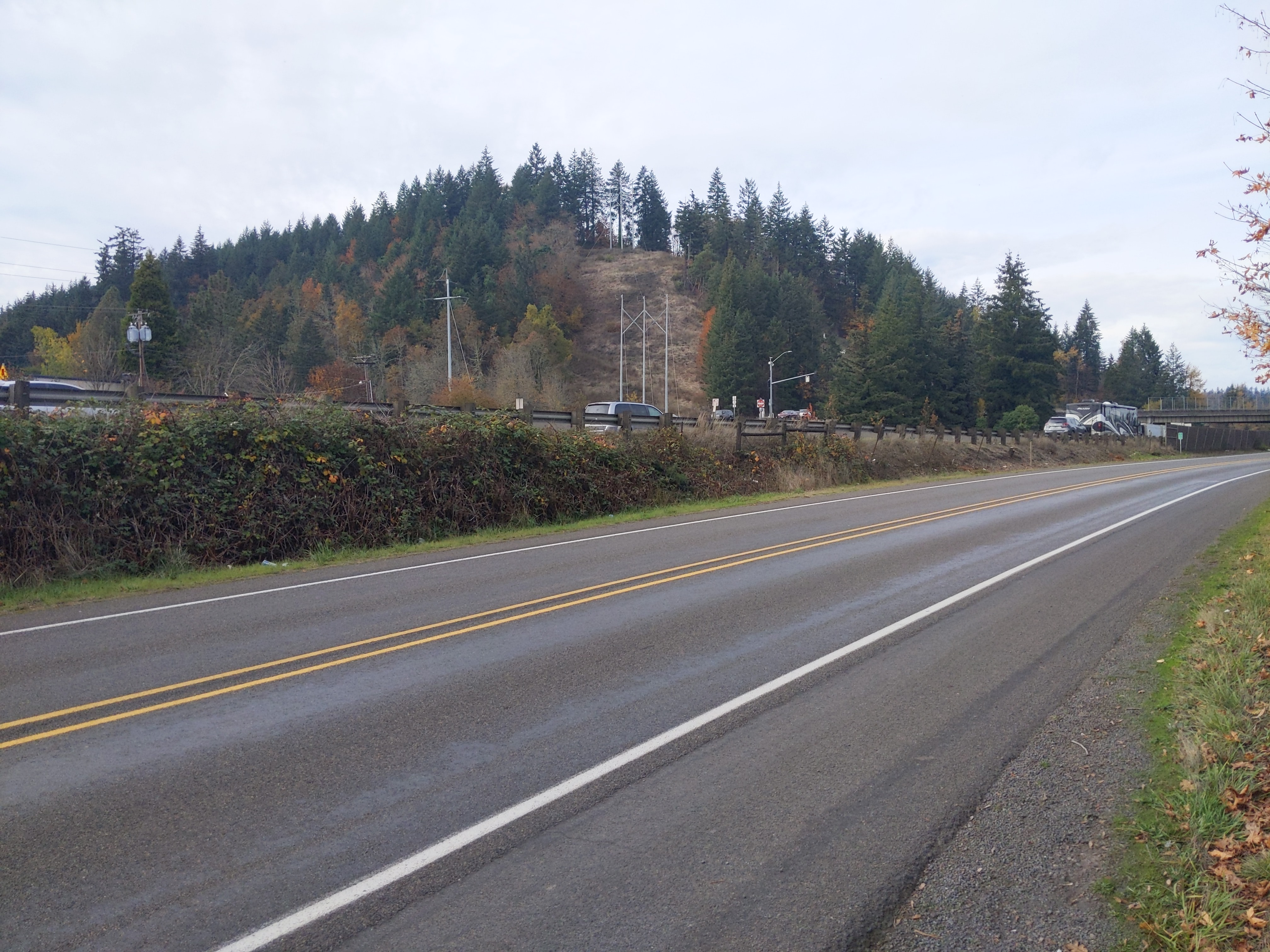
- OR-225 where it intersects I-5, Coryell ridge in the background
- Interactive map of Coryell Pass
- Elevation: 515 feet (157 m)
- Traversed by: I-5 and OR 225

Third Approach
- Location: Lane County, Oregon, U.S.
- Topo map: USGS Coryell Pass

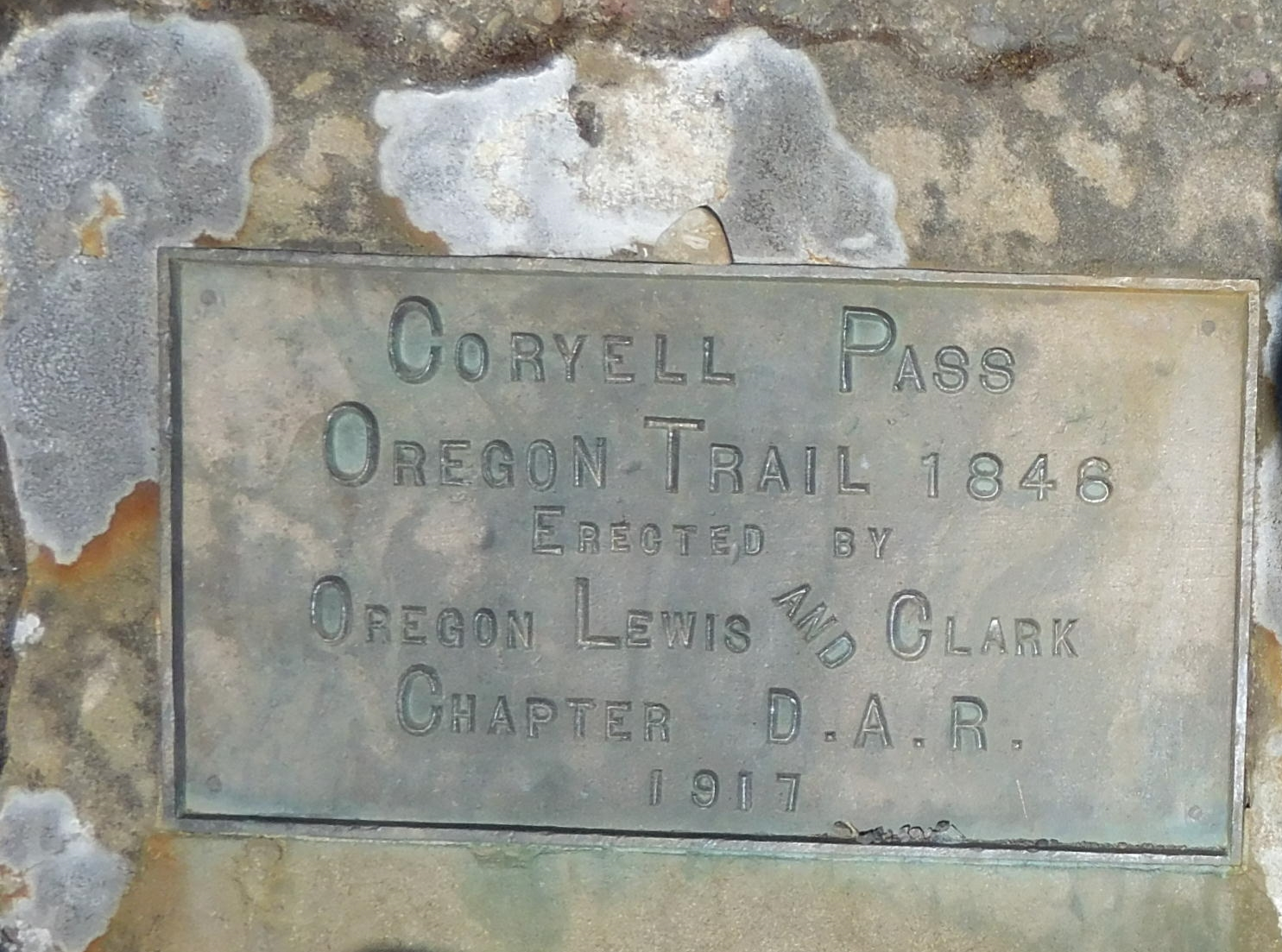
Marker placed by the Daughters of the American Revolution at Coryell Pass in 1917

Coryell Pass is a gap located near Eugene in Lane County, Oregon, United States. Its low point is located near the confluence of the Coast Fork and Middle Fork of the Willamette River. The gap is formed by the river between Eugene's South Hills and Springfield's Quarry Butte. Interstate 5 intersects OR 225 at Coryell Pass.

== Marker ==
The pass is commemorated by a brass marker located on Franklin Boulevard, on what was formerly the route of Pacific Highway. The marker, which was placed by the Daughters of the American Revolution (D.A.R.), reads "Coryell Pass, Oregon Trail, 1846, Erected by Oregon Lewis and Clark Chapter D.A.R., 1917". The pass was on the southern route of the Oregon Trail blazed by Jesse Applegate and known as the Applegate Trail.

One of earliest ferries in Oregon was operated here beginning in 1847 by Abraham Coryell and his son Lewis. Pioneer Elijah Bristow had passed this way in 1846, and later the Coryells settled there. The site had a spring and was used by Oregon Trail pioneers as a campsite.

== See also ==
- Historic ferries in Oregon
- List of mountain passes in Oregon
