= French Pass (Oregon) =

Coordinates: 45.0270866°N 119.6363980°W

French Pass is a gap in the mountains of Northeast Oregon, US, within Morrow County in an unpopulated region of the state.
