= French Pass (Waikato) =

- Interactive map of French Pass
- Location within New Zealand
- Coordinates: 37.887°S 175.526°E
- Country: New Zealand
- Region: Waikato
- Territorial authority: Waipa District
- Postal code: 3496
- Area code: 07

French Pass is a small settlement just east of Cambridge in the Waikato Region of New Zealand. The settlement is named after the road pass from Cambridge through to Whitehall. There was a road through the pass by 1887.
