= List of numbered state routes in Oregon =

Numbered Routes of the Oregon Highway System
- Highway markers for Oregon Route 7, Oregon Route 99 and Oregon Route 140

System information
- Maintained by ODOT

Highway names
- Interstates: Interstate nn (I-nn)
- US Highways: U.S. Route nn (US nn)
- State: Oregon Route nn (OR nn)
- Named highways: xx Highway No. nn

System links
- Oregon Highways; Interstate; US; State; Named; Scenic

In the U.S. state of Oregon, there are two systems for categorizing roads in the state highway system: named state highways and numbered state routes. Named highways, such as the Pacific Highway No. 1 or the North Umpqua Highway East No. 138, are primarily used internally by the Oregon Department of Transportation (ODOT) whereas numbered routes, such as Interstate 5 (I-5), U.S. Highway 20 (US 20), or Oregon Route 140 (OR 140), are posted on road signs and route markers. The two systems overlap significantly, but the route numbers are not necessarily coterminous with highway names and some routes may comprise several highways. For example, OR 47 is overlaid on the Mist–Clatskanie Highway No. 110, Nehalem Highway No. 102, and Tualatin Valley Highway No. 29. In addition to OR 47, the Tualatin Valley Highway No. 29 also comprises part of OR 8.

== Mainline routes ==
Number	Length (mi)	Length (km)	Southern or western terminus	Northern or eastern terminus	Formed	Removed	Notes
OR 2	—	—	US 101 south of Seaside	US 99W in Portland	1932	1952	Became part of US 26
OR 3	43.13	69.41	OR 82 in Enterprise	SR 129 towards Clarkston, WA	1932	current	
OR 6	51.25	82.48	US 101 / OR 131 in Tillamook	US 26 west of North Plains	1932	current	
OR 7	52.78	84.94	US 26 south of Austin	I-84 in Baker	1932	current	
OR 8	19.20	30.90	OR 6 near Gales Creek	US 26 east of Beaverton	1936	current	
OR 10	18.55	29.85	OR 219 south of Hillsboro	US 26 in Portland	1932	current	
OR 11	34.06	54.81	I-84 near Pendleton	SR 125 towards Walla Walla, WA	1932	current	
OR 14	—	—	US 101 at Hebo	OR 18 west of Willamina	1932	c. 1952	Became part of OR 22
OR 15	—	—	US 30 in Pendleton	US 730 at Cold Springs	1932	1934	
OR 18	52.78	84.94	US 101 west of Otis Junction	OR 99W north of Dayton	1932	current	
OR 19	120.57	194.04	US 26 northwest of Dayville	I-84 / US 30 in Arlington	1932	current	
OR 22	139.01	223.71	US 101 at Hebo	US 20 west of Suttle Lake	1932	current	
OR 23	—	—	US 97 at Cow Canyon	US 30 in The Dalles	1932	1952	
OR 26	—	—	US 101 in Newport	OR 99E in Albany	1932	1945	Became part of US 20
OR 27	44.79	72.08	US 20 west of Brothers	US 26 in Prineville	1932	current	
OR 31	120.57	194.04	US 395 at Valley Falls	US 97 south of La Pine	1932	current	
OR 32	—	—	US 730 east of Umatilla	US 30 near Stanfield	c. 1945	1973	
OR 34	81.40	131.00	US 101 in Waldport	US 20 in Lebanon	1932	current	
OR 35	41.54	66.85	US 26 east of Government Camp	I-84 / US 30 west of Hood River	1932	current	
OR 36	51.58	83.01	OR 126 in Mapleton	OR 99 near Junction City	1936	current	
OR 37	31.13	50.10	US 30 in Pendleton	US 730 at Cold Springs	1973	current	
OR 38	57.09	91.88	US 101 in Reedsport	I-5 / OR 99 near Drain	1932	current	
OR 39	23.64	38.04	SR 139 towards Alturas, CA	US 97 in Klamath Falls	1932	current	
OR 42	73.32	118.00	US 101 north of Coquille	I-5 / OR 99 south of Roseburg	1932	current	
OR 43	11.60	18.67	OR 99E in Oregon City	US 26 in Portland	c. 1932	current	
OR 46	19.33	31.11	US 199 in Cave Junction	Oregon Caves National Monument and Preserve	1932	current	
OR 47	79.51	127.96	OR 99W north of McMinnville	US 30 in Clatskanie	1932	current	
OR 50	—	—	OR 10 in Portland	US 97 in Madras	1932	1952	Became part of US 26
OR 51	8.69	13.99	OR 99W / OR 194 in Monmouth	OR 22 west of Salem	1932	current	
OR 52	1.65	2.66	SH-52 in Payette, ID	OR 201 north of Ontario	1957	current	
OR 52	—	—	US 26 near Bear Springs	US 197 near Maupin	1932	1956	
OR 53	18.91	30.43	US 101 near Wheeler	US 26 at Necanicum	1939	current	
OR 54	—	—	OR 99E in Albany	US 28 in Vale	1932	1941	
OR 58	86.75	139.61	I-5 / OR 99 at Goshen	US 97 north of Chemult	1932	current	
OR 62	83.52	134.41	OR 99 / OR 238 in Medford	US 97 south of Chiloquin	1932	current	
OR 66	59.68	96.05	OR 99 in Ashland	US 97 south of Klamath Falls	1932	current	
OR 69	9.90	15.93	OR 126 in Eugene	I-5 in Springfield	2002	2007	Renamed OR 569 due to vandalism
OR 70	6.97	11.22	OR 140 at Dairy	Bonanza	1932	current	
OR 74	85.09	136.94	I-84 / US 30 east of Arlington	US 395 at Nye	1932	current	
OR 78	91.55	147.34	US 20 / US 395 in Burns	US 95 at Burns Junction	1932	current	
OR 82	70.74	113.84	US 30 in La Grande	Joseph	1932	current	
OR 86	67.82	109.15	I-84 near Baker	Near Hells Canyon, ID	1932	current	
OR 90	—	—	OR 201 north of Ontario	SH-52 in Payette, ID	1932	c. 1957	Now Oregon Route 52
OR 99	205.00	329.92	I-5 south of Ashland	OR 99E / OR 99W in Junction City	1972	current	
OR 99E	109.78	176.67	OR 99 / OR 99W in Junction City	I-5 in North Portland	1972	current	
OR 99W	124.15	199.80	OR 99E / OR 99 in Junction City	I-5 in Tigard	1972	current	
OR 103	9.02	14.52	US 26 near Elsie	OR 202 at Jewell	2002	current	
OR 104	6.03	9.70	US 101 south of Warrenton	Fort Stevens State Park	2002	current	
OR 120	2.71	4.36	North Portland	I-5 / OR 99E in North Portland	2002	current	Unsigned
OR 126	204.63	329.32	US 101 in Florence	US 26 in Prineville	1972	current	
OR 127	8	13	US 26 in Hillsboro	US 30 in Burlington	2021	current	
OR 130	9.40	15.13	US 101 southwest of Hebo	OR 22 at Dolph	2002	current	
OR 131	9.08	14.61	Oceanside	US 101/OR 6 in Tillamook	2002	current	
OR 132	1.6	2.6	I-105 in Eugene	OR 569 in Eugene	1964	current	minimally signed; also referred to as Delta Hwy.
OR 138	140.58	226.24	OR 38 at Elkton	US 97 south of Chemult	c. 1960	current	
OR 140	237.01	381.43	OR 62 near White City	SR 140 towards Winnemucca, NV	c. 1960	current	
OR 141	10.46	16.83	I-5 in Wilsonville	OR 217 in Beaverton	2002	current	Unsigned
OR 153	14.34	23.08	OR 18 at Bellevue	OR 221 east of Hopewell	2002	current	Unsigned
OR 154	5.74	9.24	OR 153	OR 233 southwest of Dayton	2002	current	Minimally signed
OR 164	8.39	13.50	I-5 / OR 99E in Millersburg	I-5 / OR 99E north of Jefferson	2002	current	
OR 173	5.37	8.64	US 26 east of Government Camp	Timberline Lodge	2002	current	Unsigned
OR 180	19.23	30.95	Crystal Creek Loop at Eddyville	US 20 at Blodgett	2002	current	Unsigned
OR 182	0.75	1.21	Devils Punch Bowl State Natural Area	US 101 north of Newport	2002	2005	Unsigned
OR 194	7.56	12.17	OR 223 south of Dallas	OR 51 / OR 99W in Monmouth	2002	current	Unsigned
OR 200	42.11	67.77	North of Curtin	OR 99W in Monroe	2002	current	Unsigned
OR 201	60.21	96.90	SH-19 towards Homedale, ID	I-84 / US 30 south of Huntington	1935	current	
OR 202	45.98	74.00	US 101 in Astoria	OR 47 at Mist	1935	current	
OR 203	49.23	79.23	OR 86 northeast of Baker	I-84 / US 30 south of La Grande	1935	current	
OR 204	41.89	67.42	OR 11 north of Weston	OR 82 in Elgin	1935	current	
OR 205	73.35	118.05	Roaring Springs Ranch	OR 78 east of Burns	1935	current	
OR 206	101.66	163.61	I-84 / US 30 at Celilo	OR 74 in Heppner	1935	current	
OR 207	152.30	245.10	US 26 in Mitchell	US 730 west of Cold Springs	1935	current	
OR 208	—	—	OR 219 south of Hillsboro	OR 8 in Beaverton	1935	1985	
OR 209	—	—	OR 62	OR 58 at Crescent Lake Junction	1935	c. 1963	
OR 210	12.1	19.5	OR 219 at Scholls	OR 10 west of Hillsdale	1935	current	
OR 211	46.8	75.3	OR 99E north of Woodburn	US 26 in Sandy	1935	current	
OR 212	11.7	18.8	I-205 near Clackamas	US 26 west of Sandy	1935	current	
OR 213	55.66	89.58	I-5 / OR 99E in Salem	Portland International Airport	1935	current	
OR 214	44.79	72.08	I-5 in Woodburn	OR 22 west of Shaw	1935	current	
OR 215	—	—	OR 211 west of Molalla	OR 99E in Oregon City	1935	c. 1952	
OR 216	61.30	98.65	US 26 near Bear Springs	US 97 in Grass Valley	1935	current	
OR 217	7.52	12.10	I-5 east of Tigard	US 26 at Cedar Hills	1935	current	
OR 218	42.08	67.72	US 97 at Shaniko	OR 19 in Fossil	1935	current	
OR 219	36.47	58.69	I-5 in Woodburn	OR 8 in Hillsboro	1935	current	
OR 220	—	—	Sumpter	OR 7 at Salisbury	1935	c. 1980	
OR 221	20.74	33.38	OR 22 in Salem	OR 18 northeast of Dayton	1935	current	
OR 222	20.74	33.38	OR 99 in Creswell	OR 126B in Springfield	2002	current	Unsigned
OR 222	—	—	OR 99EB in Salem	US 20 / OR 126 west of Suttle Lake	1935	c. 1952	Became Part of Oregon Route 22
OR 223	31.40	50.53	US 20 near Wren	OR 22 west of Rickreall	1935	current	
OR 224	49.12	79.05	OR 99E in Milwaukie	Near Ripplebrook	1962	current	
OR 224	7.56	12.17	OR 223 south of Dallas	OR 51 / OR 99W in Monmouth	1935	1944	
OR 225	2.52	4.06	OR 99 in Creswell	OR 126B in Springfield	2002	current	Unsigned
OR 225	—	—	OR 99 in Sutherlin	OR 38 in Elkton	1935	1965	
OR 226	25.71	41.38	US 20 at Crabtree Corners	OR 22 at Mehama	1935	current	
OR 227	11.26	18.12	OR 62 at Trail	South of Tiller	2002	2012	Initially established 1935, decommissioned 1986
OR 228	21.40	34.44	OR 99E in Halsey	US 20 in Sweet Home	1935	current	
OR 229	31.27	50.32	US 20 north of Toledo	US 101 at Kernville	1935	current	
OR 230	23.80	38.30	OR 62 near Union Creek	OR 138 near Diamond Lake	1935	current	
OR 231	—	—	US 99 in Divide	US 99 / OR 58 in Goshen	1957	c. 1962	Former US 99, which was rerouted via I-5; US 99 was rerouted back onto this road
OR 232	—	—	OR 62 in Fort Klamath	US 97	1935	c. 1984	Originally went from US 97 to OR 209 in Crater Lake National Park
OR 233	10.70	17.22	OR 99W north of Amity	OR 99W northeast of Dayton	1935	current	
OR 234	17.78	28.61	I-5 west of Gold Hill	OR 62 north of Eagle Point	1935	current	
OR 235	—	—	US 99 southeast of Dillard	OR 38 in Drain	1956	c. 1962	Former US 99, which was rerouted via I-5; US 99 was rerouted back onto this road
OR 236	—	—	OR 62 in Eagle Point	US 97 in Klamath Falls	1935	c. 1946	
OR 237	38.93	62.65	I-84/US 30 at North Powder	OR 82 in Island City	1935	current	
OR 238	38.93	62.65	US 199/OR 99 south of Grants Pass	OR 99 in Medford	1935	current	
OR 240	11.50	18.51	OR 47 in Yamhill	OR 99W in Newberg	1935	current	
OR 241	18.92	30.45	US 101 in Coos Bay	East of Nesika County Park	2002	current	
OR 242	36.59	58.89	OR 126 south of Belknap Springs	US 20 / OR 126 in Sisters	1962	current	
OR 242	—	—	US 99E in Woodburn	OR 219 southeast of St. Paul	1935	1952	Became Oregon Route 214. Eventually Oregon Route 219 would be rerouted to this route.
OR 244	47.22	75.99	US 395 west of Ukiah	I-84/US 30 at Hilgard	c. 1980	current	
OR 244	—	—	US 99W nearTualatin	OR 43 in West Linn	1935	1952	Became part of Oregon Route 212.
OR 245	36.62	58.93	US 26 near Unity	OR 7 near Salisbury	c. 1981	current	
OR 250	5.41	8.71	US 101 north of Port Orford	Cape Blanco State Park	2002	current	Unsigned
OR 251	0.76	1.22	Port Orford Heads State Park	US 101 in Port Orford	2002	current	Unsigned
OR 255	27.60	44.42	US 101 at Brookings	US 101 south of Gold Beach	2002	current	
OR 260	20.84	33.54	US 199 southwest of Grants Pass	Grants Pass	2002	current	
OR 273	12.42	19.99	I-5 south of Siskiyou Summit	OR 66 southeast of Ashland	2002	current	Unsigned
OR 281	19.01	30.59	OR 35 at Mt. Hood	US 30/OR 35 in Hood River	2002	current	
OR 282	3.45	5.55	OR 281 south of Hood River	OR 35 south of Hood River	2002	current	
OR 293	13.58	21.85	US 97 north of Madras	OR 218 in Antelope	2002	current	
OR 331	4.84	7.79	I-84 / US 30 southeast of Pendleton	OR 11 northeast of Pendleton	2002	current	Minimal Signage
OR 332	7.93	12.76	Washington state line	OR 11 north of Milton-Freewater	2002	current	
OR 334	18.12	29.16	OR 37 north of Myrick	OR 11 east of Athena	2002	current	Unsigned
OR 335	18.12	29.16	OR 11 northeast of Pendleton	Helix	2002	current	Unsigned
OR 339	3.43	5.52	OR 11 in Milton-Freewater	Washington state line	2002	current	
OR 350	29.36	47.25	OR 82 / OR 351 in Joseph	Imnaha	2002	current	Unsigned
OR 351	6.94	11.17	South of Wallowa Lake	OR 82 / OR 350 in Joseph	2002	current	Unsigned
OR 361	11.62	18.70	US 97 southeast of Culver	US 26/US 97 in Madras	2002	current	Unsigned
OR 370	17.87	28.76	US 97 north of Redmond	OR 126 in Prineville	2002	current	Unsigned
OR 380	55.49	89.30	US 26 in Prineville	East of Paulina	2002	current	
OR 402	34.88	56.13	OR 19 at Kimberly	US 395 in Long Creek	2002	current	
OR 410	3.71	5.97	Sumpter	OR 7 southeast of Sumpter	2002	current	Unsigned
OR 411	—	—	OR 229 in Siletz	OR 180 in Nashville	2002	current	Signed as Logsden Road; not state-maintained
OR 413	11.45	18.43	OR 86S / OR 414 in Halfway	Cornucopia	2002	current	Unsigned
OR 414	0.91	1.46	OR 86S / OR 413 in Halfway	OR 86 east of Halfway	2002	current	Unsigned
OR 422	5.29	8.51	South of Klamath Agency	US 97 southwest of Chiloquin	2002	current	
OR 428	—	—	US 97 near the Klamath Marsh National Wildlife Refuge	OR 62 in Fort Klamath	1948	1984	
OR 429	2.39	3.85	Near Crescent Lake	OR 58 at Crescent Lake Junction	2002	current	Unsigned
OR 451	10.39	16.72	US 20 southwest of Vale	US 20 in Vale	2002	current	Unsigned
OR 452	2.75	4.43	OR 201 southwest of Adrian	SH-18 towards Parma, ID	2002	current	Unsigned
OR 453	5.09	8.19	OR 454 southeast of Adrian	Idaho state line	2002	current	Unsigned
OR 454	5.09	8.19	OR 452 southeast of Adrian	Idaho state line	2002	current	Unsigned
OR 501	9.49	15.27	Southwest of Alsea	OR 34 at Alsea	2002	current	
OR 528	1.40	2.25	OR 126B in Springfield	OR 126 in Springfield	2002	current	
OR 540	14.20	22.85	Cape Arago State Park	US 101 in North Bend	2002	current	
OR 542	18.78	30.22	Powers	OR 42 southeast of Myrtle Point	2002	current	Unsigned
OR 551	5.94	9.56	OR 99E southwest of Aurora	I-5 in Wilsonville	2002	current	
OR 569	9.90	15.93	OR 126 in Eugene	I-5 in Springfield	2007	current	Formerly OR 69
Former

== Special routes ==
Number	Length (mi)	Length (km)	Southern or western terminus	Northern or eastern terminus	Formed	Removed	Notes
OR 18 Bus.	8.56	13.78	OR 18 at Wallace Bridge	OR 18 east of Sheridan	1957	current	
OR 42S	16.94	27.26	US 101 in Bandon	OR 42 in Coquille	c. 1950	current	
OR 62 Bus.	—	—	OR 62 in White City	OR 62 in Medford	—	—	Signed
OR 86S	1.15	1.85	OR 86 northeast of Richland	OR 413 / OR 414 in Halfway	2002	current	Unsigned
OR 99E Bus.	9.77	15.72	I-5 / OR 22 / OR 99E in Salem	OR 99E north of Salem	1986	current	
OR 104S	0.95	1.53	OR 104 in Warrenton	US 101 in Warrenton	2002	current	Unsigned now; was briefly signed
OR 126 Bus.	—	—	I-105 / OR 99 / OR 126 in Eugene	OR 126 in Springfield	1972	current	
OR 223 Spur	4.32	6.95	OR 223 in Dallas	OR 22 in Rickreal	—	—	Signed
OR 422S	0.19	0.31	OR 422 in Chiloquin	Chiloquin	2002	current	Unsigned
