= Oregon Route 99W =

State highway in northwestern Oregon, US

Oregon Route 99W

Route information
- Maintained by ODOT
- Length: 124.15 mi (199.80 km)
- Existed: 1972–present

Major junctions
- South end: OR 99 / OR 99E in Junction City
- OR 200 in Monroe; US 20 / OR 34 in Corvallis; OR 51 in Monmouth; OR 22 in Rickreall; OR 153 / OR 233 in Amity; OR 18 in McMinnville; OR 47 in Saint Joseph; OR 240 / OR 219 in Newberg; OR 141 / OR 217 in Tigard; OR 10 in South Portland
- North end: I-5 in Southwest Portland

Location
- Country: United States
- State: Oregon
- Counties: Benton, Lane, Multnomah, Polk, Washington, Yamhill

Highway system
- Oregon Highways; Interstate; US; State; Named; Scenic
← OR 99E	→ US 101

Oregon Route 99W is a state-numbered route in Oregon, United States, that runs from OR 99 and OR 99E in Junction City north to I-5 in southwestern Portland. Some signage continues it north to US 26 near downtown, but most signage agrees with the Oregon Department of Transportation's (ODOT) description, ending it at I-5. OR 99W is known by ODOT as the Pacific Highway West No. 1W (see Oregon highways and routes); that highway continues north through downtown (along a former extension of OR 99W) to the Pacific Highway No. 1 (I-5) in northern Portland, as well as south on OR 99 to the Pacific Highway (I-5) in Eugene.

Until around 1972, OR 99W was U.S. Route 99W, rejoining OR 99E (formerly US 99E) in northern Portland. US 99 then continued north along present I-5 into Washington; the next segment still numbered 99 is WA 99 south of Seattle.

== Route description ==
The Pacific Highway West begins at the interchange with I-5 (Pacific Highway) and OR 126 Business (McKenzie Highway No. 15) in eastern Eugene. It heads west through downtown Eugene along OR 99 and OR 126 Business, and then northwest and north to Junction City on OR 99.

At Junction City, OR 99 ends and OR 99W begins along the Pacific Highway West, while OR 99E heads northeast on the Albany-Junction City Highway No. 58. While OR 99E quickly crosses the Willamette River, OR 99W stays on its west side through the Willamette Valley, passing through towns such as Monroe, Corvallis, Monmouth, Rickreall, Amity, McMinnville and Lafayette. Oregon Route 18 provides a bypass for OR 99W around downtown McMinnville and Lafayette.

At McMinnville, OR 99W turns northeast. It passes through the winemaking towns of Dundee and Newberg before entering the Portland suburb of Sherwood. OR 18 provides a partial bypass for OR 99W around downtown Dundee and Newberg. The bypass currently ends at OR 219, but is proposed to extend northeast to OR 99W northeast of Newberg. OR 99W then skirts the city of Tualatin and passes through Tigard where it becomes Barbur Boulevard before entering Portland and immediately ending at I-5.

The Pacific Highway West, however, continues northeast and north, paralleling I-5 on Barbur Boulevard. OR 10 joins at Capitol Highway, which is not a state highway. South of the Ross Island Bridge approach, Oregon Highway 99W and OR 10 split from Barbur Boulevard onto Naito Parkway, an arterial that once connected directly to Harbor Drive. OR 10 ends at the west end of the Ross Island Bridge, which carries US 26, the Mt. Hood Highway No. 26. Until around 2005, US 26 came off the bridge onto the Pacific Highway West north into downtown Portland, but it now heads west on the locally maintained Arthur Street to reach I-405.

At the overpass over I-405 is the former split with Harbor Drive, which was replaced by Tom McCall Waterfront Park in 1974. The road now runs into Naito Parkway (formerly Front Avenue), and is state-maintained until Market Street, the eastbound half of the one-way pair of the Sunset Highway (US 26 left the Pacific Highway West here prior to ca. 2005).

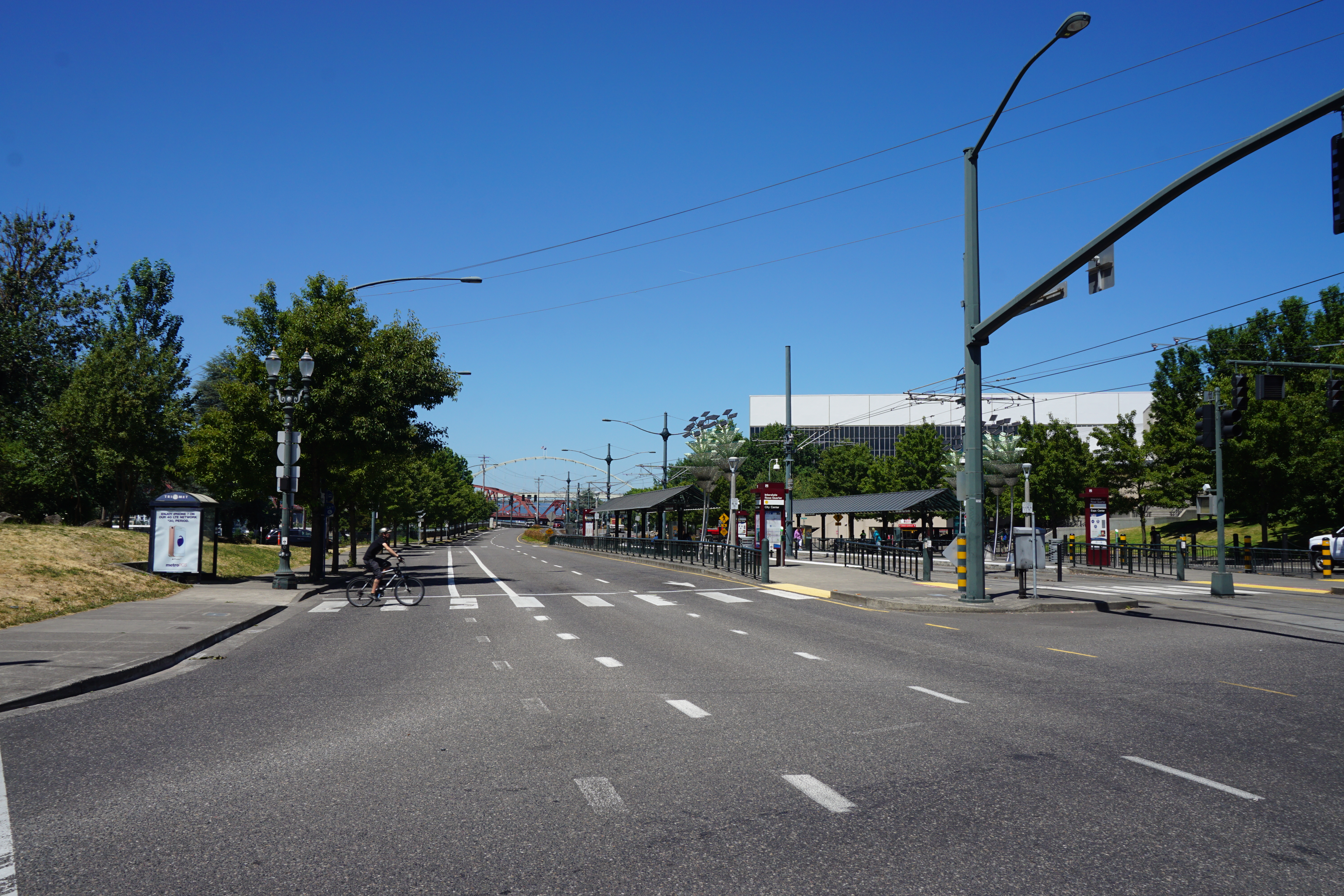
Former Oregon Route 99W as North Interstate Avenue in Portland

The Pacific Highway West continues north through downtown, locally maintained along Naito Parkway, to the state-maintained Steel Bridge. There is a direct ramp for northbound traffic onto the bridge, but the former southbound ramp is now used by the MAX Light Rail system, and so southbound traffic must head west to 3rd Avenue, three blocks west of Naito Parkway.

At the northeast end of the Steel Bridge, the Pacific Highway West again becomes locally maintained, and heads north on Interstate Avenue all the way to I-5 (the Pacific Highway) near the Interstate Bridge. It is again state-maintained north of Argyle Street.

== History ==
U.S. Highway 99W
- Location: Portland–Junction City
- Existed: 1930–1971

The first highway in the corridor was the Capitol Highway (Highway 3), from Portland to Salem via Dayton (roughly present OR 99W and OR 221). In 1927 it was merged with the West Side Highway, which ran from Dayton to Junction City, to form the West Side Pacific Highway, still numbered 3, and a western loop of the Pacific Highway (Highway 1/U.S. Route 99). (The former Capitol Highway south of Dayton was removed from the system, but was later taken over as the Salem-Dayton Highway.) The section north of Portland was initially named Multnomah Boulevard until Interstate Avenue was adopted in 1916; the street was paved in the late 1920s amid several minor realignments to provide for a 100-foot (30 m) wide highway.

In 1930, Highway 3 was assigned the U.S. Route 99W number and Highway 1 (old US 99) between the ends of Highway 3 became US 99E. Highway 1 was similarly split in 1938, forming the Pacific Highway West - Highway 1W - and the Pacific Highway East, Highway 1E. Highway 1W was formed from Highway 3, and extended north on Interstate Avenue to just south of the Interstate Bridge.

In 1957, with the assignment of I-5, the Pacific Highway (Highway 1) was moved to its planned alignment, resulting in an extension of Highway 1W south to Eugene. US 99W however continued to terminate at Junction City; the new I-5 was designated US 99 when it opened in 1961. (US 99W from south of downtown Portland north to its end was temporarily part of US 99 from 1961 to 1963, when I-5 opened north of downtown.)

US 99 became OR 99 in December 1971, resulting in the renumbering of US 99W to OR 99W. It was truncated in 1979 to I-5 just north of the Tigard/Portland line. It was again re-extended to south of downtown in 1996, with various signs identifying it as 99W placed sporadically between downtown and Tigard.

=== Old alignments ===
The original alignment in southern Portland, bypassed in the 1930s by Barbur Boulevard, is still called Capitol Highway. It begins at the present north end of OR 99W and runs first east, then west, of Highway 1W, eventually merging with OR 10 (formerly the Beaverton-Hillsdale Highway) before ending at Highway 1W south of downtown.

Through downtown Portland, the original alignment took US 99W across the Broadway Bridge, reaching it via 4th Avenue, Burnside Street, and Broadway northbound, and Broadway, Pine Street, and 6th Avenue southbound. In 1950 it was realigned along Harbor Drive, the Steel Bridge and a realigned Interstate Avenue. Harbor Drive was removed in 1974, resulting in OR 99W moving west one block to Front Street (now Naito Parkway) downtown.

== Major intersections ==
Note: mileposts do not reflect actual mileage due to realignments.

County	Location	mi	km	Destinations	Notes
Lane	Junction City	108.76	175.03	OR 99E north / OR 99 south – Harrisburg, Albany, Junction City, Eugene	
Benton	Monroe	101.15	162.79	Territorial Highway (OR 200) – Cheshire, Florence	
Benton	Corvallis	84.15	135.43	OR 34 east to I-5 – Albany, Lebanon	Interchange; northbound exit and southbound entrance
Benton	Corvallis	84.15	135.43	US 20 west / OR 34 west – Philomath, Oregon Coast	Interchange; southern end of US 20 overlap
Benton	Corvallis	83.42	134.25	US 20 east / OR 34 east to I-5 – Albany, Lebanon	Northern end of US 20 overlap
Polk	Monmouth	63.42	102.06	OR 51 (OR 194) – Kings Valley, Monmouth City Center, Independence	
Polk	Rickreall	57.81	93.04	Rickreall Road (OR 223) – Dallas, Derry	
Polk		57.43	92.42	OR 22 – Oregon Coast, Salem	Interchange
Yamhill	Amity	44.75	72.02	Nursery Street (OR 153) – Hopewell, Salem	
Yamhill	Amity	44.68	71.91	5th Street (OR 153) – Bellevue, Sheridan, Willamina	Northern end of OR 153 overlap
Yamhill		43.50	70.01	OR 233 – Dayton	
Yamhill		39.24	63.15	OR 18 east – Dayton, Portland	Interchange
Yamhill	McMinnville	38.99	62.75	OR 18 west – Sheridan, Oregon Coast	
Yamhill	McMinnville	37.70	60.67	3rd Street	
Yamhill		34.85	56.09	OR 47 north – Carlton, Forest Grove	
Yamhill	Lafayette	32.29	51.97	Madison Street to Lafayette Highway – Hopewell	
Yamhill	Dayton Junction	29.73	47.85	OR 18 / OR 233 – Dayton, Salem, Oregon Coast	
Yamhill	Newberg	23.71	38.16	OR 240 west – Chehalem Valley, Yamhill	
Yamhill	Newberg	23.41	37.67	OR 219 north – Scholls, Hillsboro	Southern end of OR 219 overlap
Yamhill	Newberg	22.89	36.84	OR 219 south – Champoeg State Park, St. Paul, Salem, Woodburn	Northern end of OR 219 overlap
Washington	Tigard	8.82	14.19	Hall Boulevard (OR 141) – Metzger, Durham	
Washington	Tigard	8.66	13.94	OR 217 / Sunset Highway (US 26) – Beaverton, Salem	Interchange
Multnomah	Portland	7.44	11.97	I-5 – Portland, Salem	Interchange
1.000 mi = 1.609 km; 1.000 km = 0.621 mi: Concurrency terminus; Incomplete access
