= Maud Williamson State Recreation Site =

State park in Oregon, United States

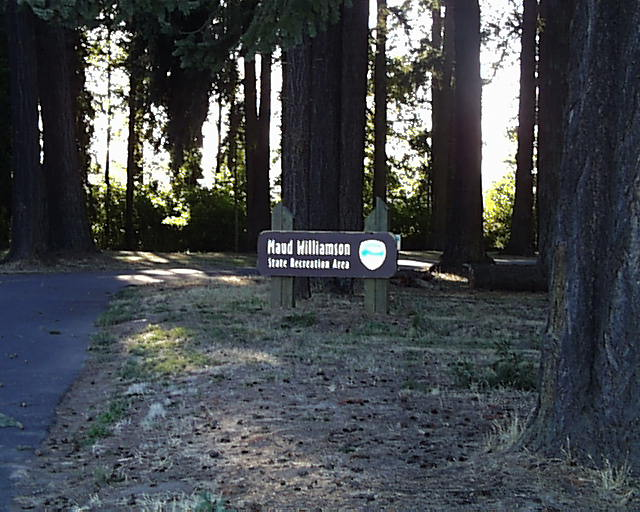
- Oregon State Parks

- Location within Oregon Location within the United States
- Type: Public, state
- Location: Yamhill County, Oregon
- Nearest city: McMinnville
- Coordinates: 45°05′47″N 123°04′01″W
- Area: 24 acres (9.7 ha)
- Operator: Oregon Parks and Recreation Department

Maud Williamson State Recreation Site is a state park in Yamhill County, Oregon, United States, administered by the Oregon Parks and Recreation Department. The park is located at the intersection of Oregon Route 221 and Oregon Route 153 near Wheatland. The park entrance is across from Wheatland Road, which leads to the Wheatland Ferry.

The site includes of a stand of second-growth Douglas-fir and a historic farmhouse. In the early spring trilliums are abundant.

The 24-acre (9.7 ha) park formerly offered overnight camping, but now is day-use only. Amenities include picnic tables, restrooms, a covered picnic shelter, volleyball courts and horseshoe pits. Admission is free, but there is a fee to reserve the picnic shelter.

== History ==
Maud Williamson was a teacher at the school in Wheatland for many years. In about 1930, a new Wheatland School was built across the Dayton-Salem highway from the park, which then was a farm owned by Williamson.

Maud Williamson died in about 1933, and willed her timberland and house to the State of Oregon in memory of her mother, Ruby T. Williamson. Part of the park is situated on the original Donation Land Claim of Adam Matheny, one of the sons of Daniel Matheny, who established the ferry in Wheatland.

The adjoining Charles S. Williamson House is a Queen Anne-style house built in 1890 by Maud Williamson's father, who was postmaster of Wheatland for 12 years. Maud Williamson once lived there with her brother. The house is not open to the public.

A bronze plaque commemorating the donation of the site was placed in the park in 1934.

== See also ==
- Hopewell, Oregon
- List of Oregon state parks
