= Oregon Route 18 =

State highway in western Oregon, US

Oregon Route 18
- Route 18; mainline in red, business route in blue

Route information
- Maintained by ODOT
- Existed: 1932–present
- Component highways: Salmon River Highway No. 39

Major junctions
- West end: US 101 in Otis Junction
- OR 22 in Valley Junction; OR 22 near Willamina; OR 99W in McMinnville; OR 99W near Dayton
- East end: OR 219 near Newberg

Location
- Country: United States
- State: Oregon
- Counties: Lincoln, Tillamook, Polk, Yamhill

Highway system
- Oregon Highways; Interstate; US; State; Named; Scenic
← OR 11	→ OR 19

Oregon Route 18 is a state highway that runs between the Oregon Coast, near Lincoln City, and Newberg. OR 18 traverses the Salmon River Highway No. 39 of the Oregon state highway system, named after the river alongside its westernmost segments.

== Route description ==
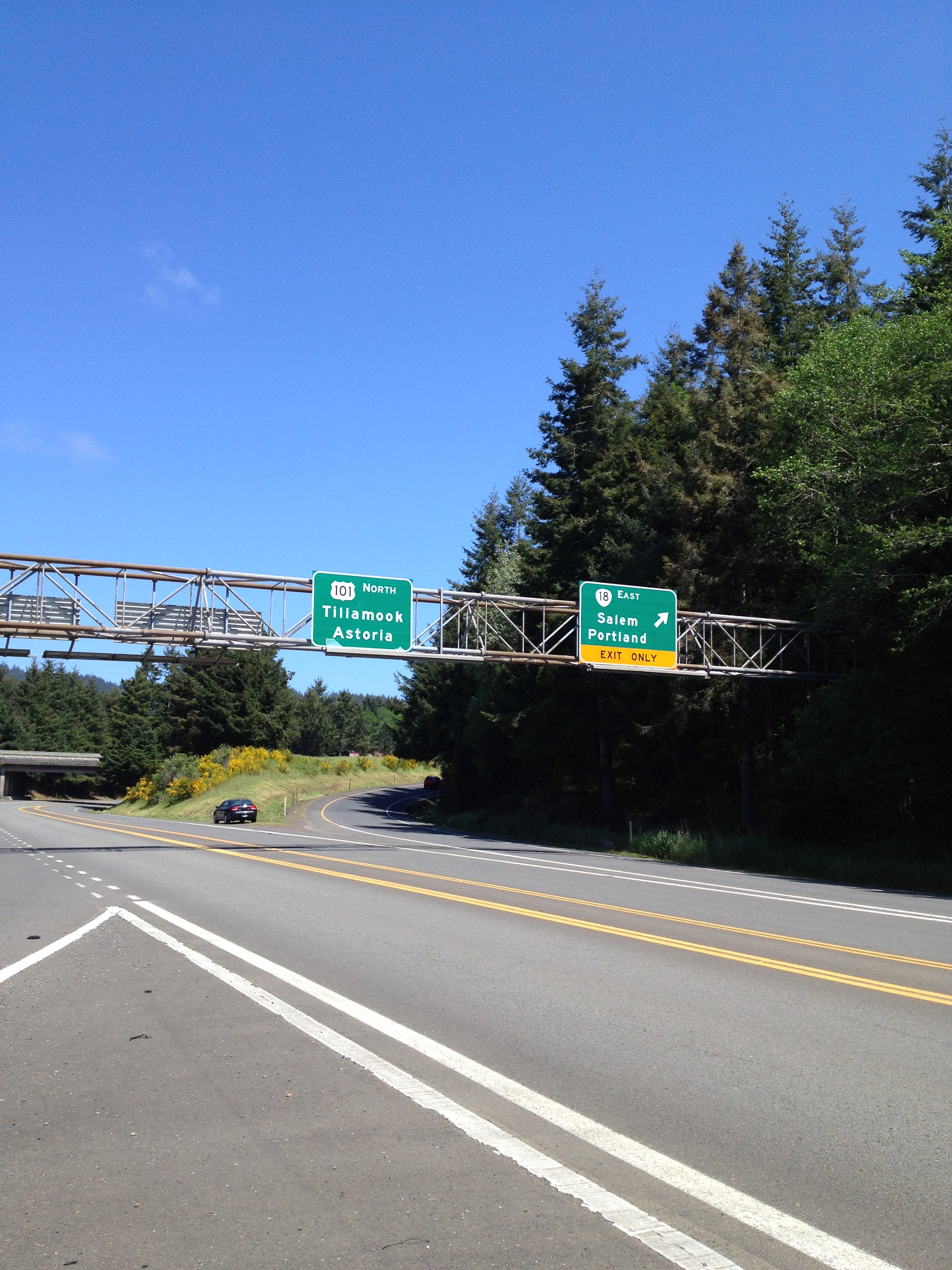
Oregon 18 interchange from US 101 north in Otis Junction

OR 18 begins (at its western terminus) at a junction with U.S. Route 101, a few miles north of Lincoln City near Otis Junction. From there it winds eastward though the coast range along the Salmon River, past Rose Lodge and through a stand of timber known as the Van Duzer Corridor. Emerging from the coast range, it enters the fringes of the Willamette Valley in the community of Grand Ronde. It is briefly joined by Oregon Route 22 at a location known as Valley Junction, and overlaps OR 22 in a four-mile (6 km) stretch between Grand Ronde and Willamina, at which point OR 22 splits southeast towards Salem and OR 18 continues northeast towards the Portland area. Also in Willamina, a business route veers to the north to serve the cities of Willamina and Sheridan; east of Sheridan the business route rejoins the mainline. This business loop was the former route and highway until 1957, when the current Oregon Route 18 was built as a bypass.

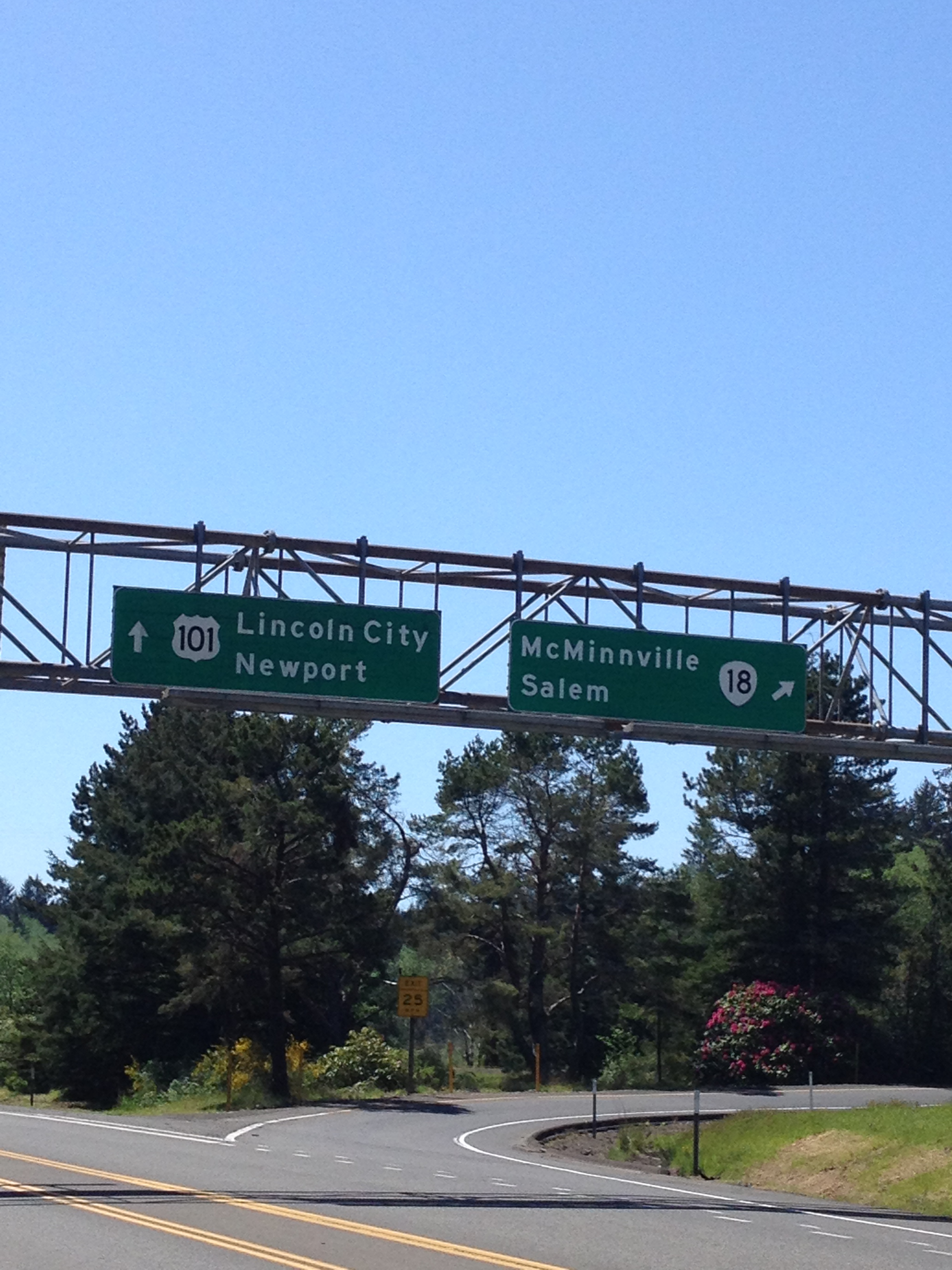
Oregon 18 interchange from US 101 south in Otis Junction

The highway continues northeast on a straight and level course through Willamette Valley farmland, including the community of Bellevue which intersects with Oregon Route 153, until it intersects with Oregon Route 99W just south of McMinnville. In the McMinnville area, OR 99W serves as the primary business route (entering the downtown core) whereas OR 18 is a bypass route. Two interchanges along OR 18 provide access to McMinnville, including Three-Mile Lane, a spur of the highway. Oregon Route 18 provides direct access to the McMinnville Airport and the Evergreen Aviation Museum, home of the Spruce Goose. East of McMinnville, Oregon Route 18 intersects Oregon Route 233, with which it overlaps until its eastern terminus, and Oregon Route 221; the latter near the city of Dayton. It then crosses over the Yamhill River to a second junction with OR 99W. OR 18 then follows OR 99W to Dundee, and follows the Newberg-Dundee bypass and terminates at a junction with OR 219. Typically, commuters continue north on OR 99W into the Portland area.

== History ==
The highway is rather variant in its configuration. For most of its length, the highway is a two-lane undivided highway, with intersections and cross traffic. There are some limited-access stretches in the "bypass" sections (around the Willamina/Sheridan area, and near McMinnville and Dayton), and the occasional interchange in these stretches. This section was proposed by the Oregon State Highway Commission in 1955 as part of the adoption of new routes bypassing city centers.

In addition, there is a stretch between Willamina and Sheridan where the highway becomes a 4-lane divided expressway.

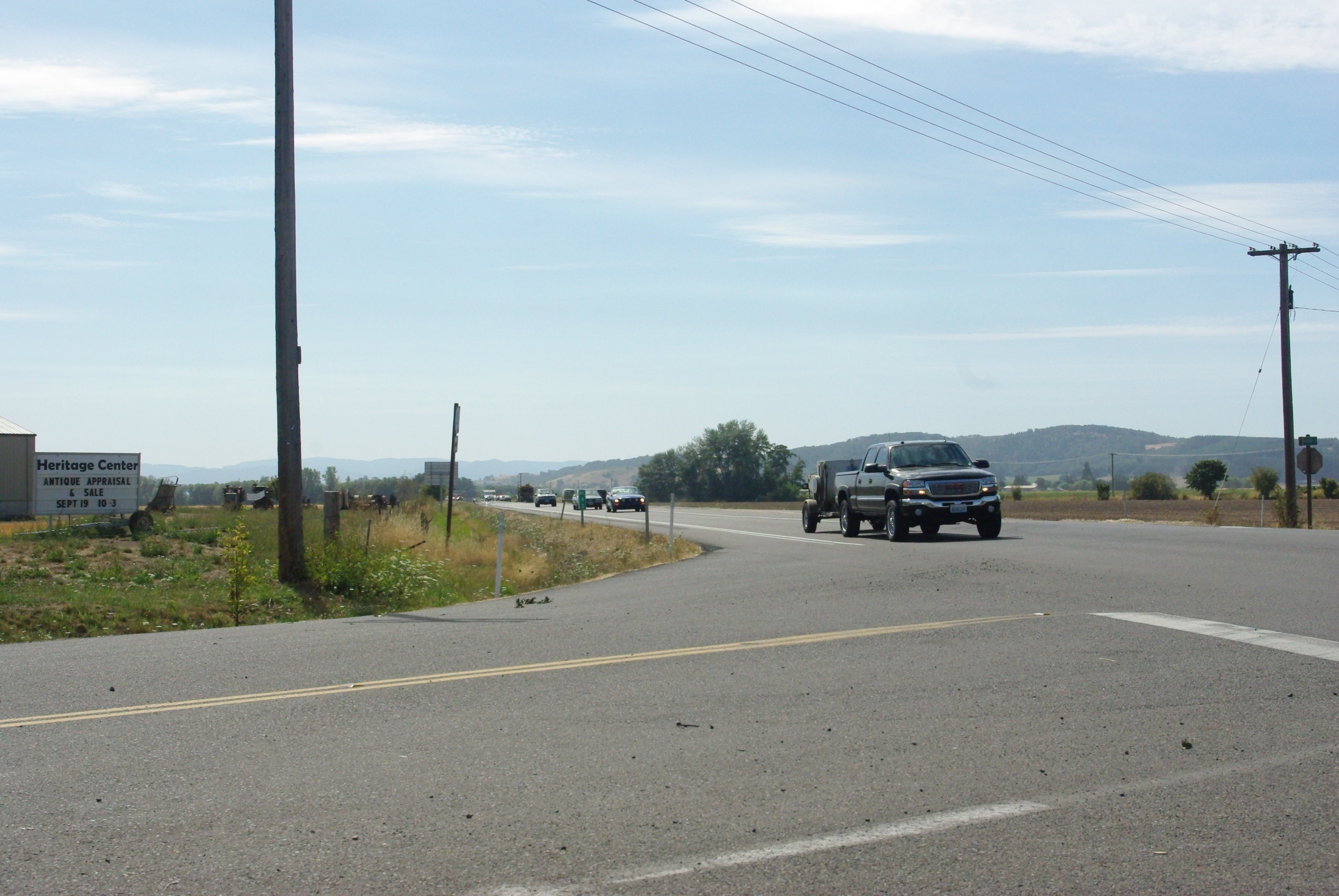
Oregon 18 approaching McMinnville

For several years, Route 18 has had a notorious reputation with Oregon motorists as an extremely unsafe highway with a relatively high number of fatal accidents. In 1995, the opening of two casinos in Grand Ronde and Lincoln City respectively, have greatly increased traffic on OR 18.

There are two completed expansions to the highway. One is a project which widened Oregon Route 18 to a four-lane expressway in the stretch between Grand Ronde and Willamina; an area where increased traffic (largely due to the casino) has caused significant delays. A later constructed overpass has closed down and blocked off a dangerous intersection.

The second project is a bypass around the Newberg-Dundee area intended to alleviate severe congestion that occurred along 99W. The Newberg-Dundee bypass is an expressway, numbered Oregon Route 18. Construction on the first 4-mile (6.4 km) phase began in June 2013, and the section opened at 5am on January 6, 2018. This section connects Oregon 219 south of Newberg to 99W west of Dundee. The entire 11-mile (18 km) bypass was expected to cost $262 million. It has four lanes and reconnects to 99W east of Newberg.

== Major intersections ==
Milepoints are as reported by ODOT and do not necessarily reflect current mileage. Z indicates overlapping mileage due to construction longer than established route, and – indicates negative mileage behind established beginning point. Segments that are locally maintained may be omitted. For routes traversing multiple named state highways, each milepoint is preceded by the corresponding state highway number.

County	Location	Milepoint	Exit	Destinations	Notes
Lincoln	Otis Junction	–0.22– 0.25	—	US 101 – Tillamook, Astoria, Lincoln City, Seaside, Newport	Interchange
Tillamook	No major junctions				
Polk		22.51– 22.66	—	Spirit Mountain Casino	Interchange
Polk	Valley Junction	23.04		OR 22 west – Hebo, Tillamook	Western end of concurrency with OR 22
Polk		24.40– 24.94	25	Fort Hill Road / Yamhill River Road	Interchange
Polk		26.77– 27.00	—	OR 18 Bus. east – Willamina, Sheridan	Interchange; eastbound exit and entrance
Polk		26.86– 27.14	—	OR 22 east – Willamina, Salem	Interchange; westbound signage; eastern end of concurrency with OR 22
Polk		27.17	—	OR 22 east – Salem	Interchange; eastbound signage; eastbound exit only
Yamhill	Sheridan	32.38– 32.78	33	Sheridan	Interchange
Yamhill		34.11	34	OR 18 Bus. west – Sheridan, Willamina	Interchange; westbound exit and eastbound entrance
Yamhill	Bellevue	36.93		OR 153 – Amity, Salem	
Yamhill	McMinnville	43.84– 44.60	—	OR 99W – McMinnville, Corvallis	Interchange; left exit eastbound; Corvallis appears only on westbound signage
Yamhill		45.88– 46.37	—	McMinnville Spur – McMinnville	Interchange
Yamhill		49.91		OR 233 south (Lafayette Highway) – Hopewell, Amity, Lafayette	Western end of concurrency with OR 233; Amity only appears on westbound signage
Yamhill	Dayton	51.18– 51.33	—	OR 221 south – Dayton, Salem	Interchange
Yamhill		52.59– 52.71		OR 99W – Newberg, Portland; OR 233	No eastbound access to OR 99W south Northern terminus of OR 233
Yamhill	Dundee				OR 99W – Newberg, Portland
Yamhill	Newberg				OR 219 – Woodburn
1.000 mi = 1.609 km; 1.000 km = 0.621 mi: Concurrency terminus; Incomplete access

== Special routes ==
=== Oregon Route 18 Business ===
Oregon Route 18 Business
- Location: Willamina–Sheridan
- Length: 8.56 mi (13.78 km)
- Existed: 1957–present

Oregon Route 18 Business is a business route state highway in the U.S. state of Oregon that runs parallel to Oregon Route 18 between the Willamina, and Sheridan, in the Yamhill Valley. OR 18B traverses the Willamina–Sheridan Highway No. 157 of the Oregon state highway system. It is also known as the West Valley Highway.

Oregon 18B begins (at its western terminus) at a junction with Oregon Route 18 and Oregon Route 22, at Valley Junction near Willimina. From there it travels eastward just north of the South Yamhill River. The river occasionally floods and closes the road. It passes through the community of Shipley, before entering Sheridan. OR 18B then reconnects to OR 18 at the eastern edge of Sheridan.

The business loop was the former main route and highway until 1957, when the current Oregon Route 18 was built as a bypass. Route 18 Business is 8.60 miles (13.84 km) long. The only traffic light on the road is in Sheridan at the intersection of 18B and Bridge Street where Sheridan Bridge crosses the South Yamhill River. In Sheridan the highway is Main Street. It is classified as a Rural Major Connector highway.

Business 18 averages approximately 5,900 vehicles per day at its eastern terminus and 6,000 near the western terminus in Willimina. Traffic averages around 5,400 vehicles per day between those two points.

==== Major intersections ====
Milepoints are as reported by ODOT and do not necessarily reflect current mileage. Z indicates overlapping mileage due to construction longer than established route, and – indicates negative mileage behind established beginning point. Segments that are locally maintained may be omitted. For routes traversing multiple named state highways, each milepoint is preceded by the corresponding state highway number.

County	Location	Milepoint	Destinations	Notes
Polk		0.00– 0.49	OR 18 west / OR 22 west – Oregon Coast OR 18 east / OR 22 east – McMinnville, Salem	Partial interchange
Yamhill	Willamina	2.24	Willamina Creek	
Yamhill		8.60	OR 18 east	Interchange
1.000 mi = 1.609 km; 1.000 km = 0.621 mi
