= Oregon Route 233 =

State highway in Yamhill County, Oregon, US

Oregon Route 233
- Route 233 highlighted in red

Route information
- Maintained by ODOT
- Length: 10.70 mi (17.22 km)

Major junctions
- South end: OR 99W near Amity
- OR 18 in Dayton
- North end: OR 99W near Dayton

Location
- Country: United States
- State: Oregon
- County: Yamhill

Highway system
- Oregon Highways; Interstate; US; State; Named; Scenic
← OR 230	→ OR 234

Oregon Route 233 is an Oregon state highway which runs between the cities of Amity and Dayton, USA, in the Willamette Valley.

== Route description ==
OR 233 begins at an intersection with Oregon Route 99W in Amity. It heads northeast from there, passing through Willamette Valley farmland, ending at an intersection with Oregon Route 18 between Dayton and McMinnville. The highway then heads east (through Dayton), concurrent with OR 18, before both highways terminate at an intersection with OR 99W just west of Dundee.

OR 233 comprises part of the Salmon River Highway No. 39 (see Oregon highways and routes), part of the Lafayette Highway No. 154, and the Amity-Dayton Highway No. 155. The concurrency with OR 18 comprises the Salmon River Highway section.

== Major intersections ==
The entire route is in Yamhill County.

Location		km	Destinations	Notes
Amity	0.0	0.0	OR 99W – Amity, Corvallis, McMinnville, Forest Grove	
Dayton	7.4	11.9	OR 154 south – Salem	Northern terminus of unsigned OR 154
Dayton	7.9	12.7	OR 18 west – McMinnville	Southern end of OR 18 overlap
Dayton	9.4	15.1	OR 221 south – Dayton, Salem	Northern terminus of OR 221
	10.6	17.1	OR 99W north	Termini of OR 18 and 233, no access to OR 99W south from OR 18/233
1.000 mi = 1.609 km; 1.000 km = 0.621 mi
