= Oregon Route 153 =

State highway in Yamhill County, Oregon, US

Oregon Route 153
- Route 153 highlighted in red

Route information
- Maintained by ODOT
- Length: 14.34 mi (23.08 km)
- Existed: 2002–present

Major junctions
- West end: OR 18 in Bellevue
- OR 99W in Amity; OR 154 near Hopewell
- East end: OR 221 near Hopewell

Location
- Country: United States
- State: Oregon
- County: Yamhill

Highway system
- Oregon Highways; Interstate; US; State; Named; Scenic
← OR 141	→ OR 154

Oregon Route 153 is an Oregon state highway running from OR 18 in Bellevue to OR 221 near Hopewell. OR 153 is known as the Bellevue-Hopewell Highway No. 153 (see Oregon highways and routes). It is 14.34 miles (23.08 km) long and runs east–west, entirely within Yamhill County.

OR 153 was established in 2002 as part of Oregon's project to assign route numbers to highways that previously were not assigned.

== Route description ==
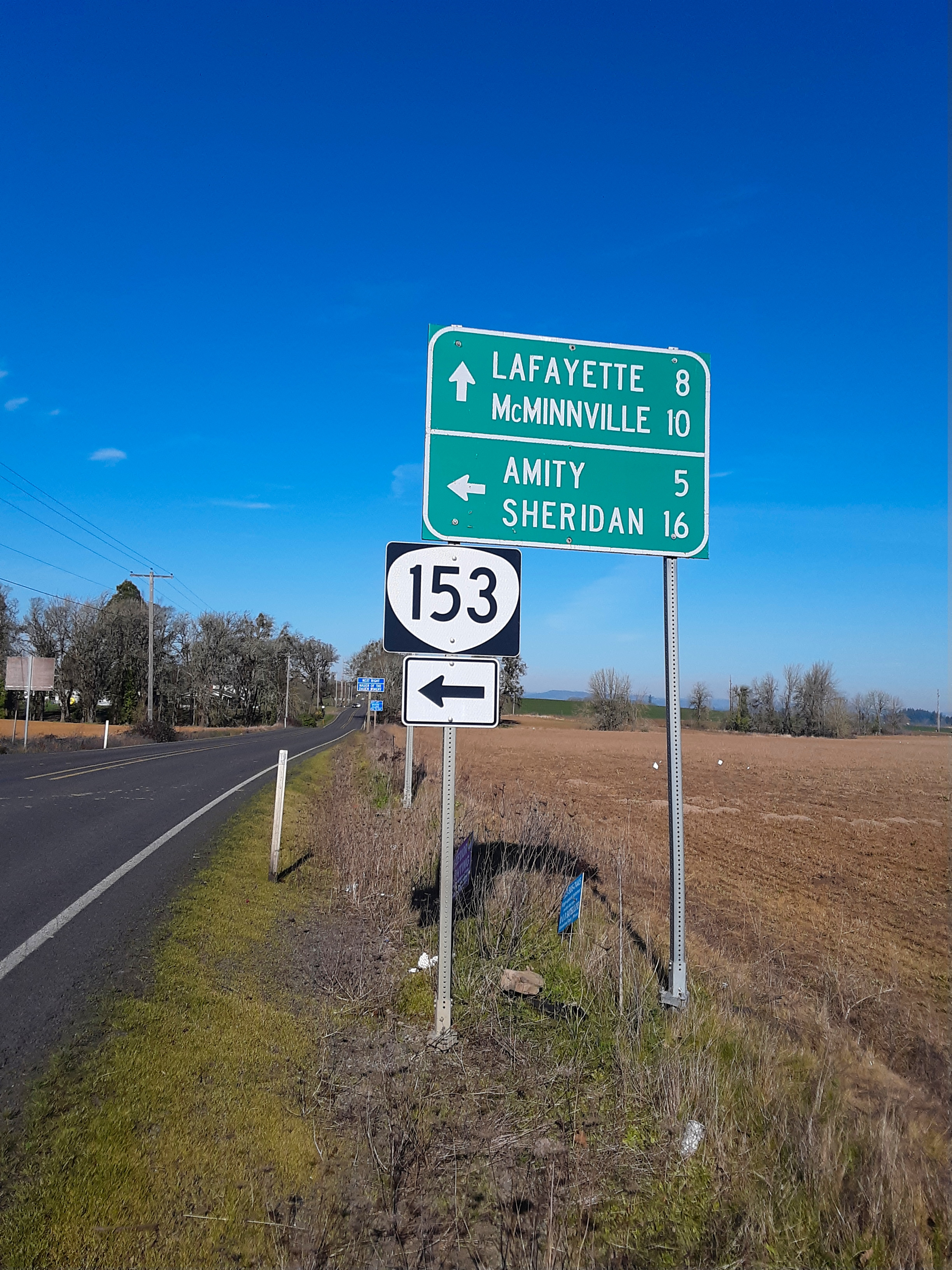
OR 153 at its junction with OR 154 northwest of Hopewell

OR 153 begins at an intersection with OR 18 at Bellevue and heads east to Amity. At Amity, OR 153 overlaps OR 99W for 0.07 miles (0.11 km), heading south. OR 153 then continues east through Hopewell, ending at an intersection with OR 221 1.34 miles east of Hopewell, near the Maud Williamson State Recreation Site. By continuing south on OR 221 (Wallace Road) for 0.3 miles to Wheatland Road, it is possible to cross the Willamette River into Marion County via the Wheatland Ferry.

== History ==
OR 153 was assigned to the Bellevue-Hopewell Highway in 2002.

== Major intersections ==
The entire route is in Yamhill County.

Location	mi	km	Destinations	Notes
Bellevue	0.00	0.00	OR 18	
Amity	6.23	10.03	OR 99W north	Northern end of OR 99W overlap
Amity	6.30	10.14	OR 99W south	Southern end of OR 99W overlap
Near Hopewell	10.54	16.96	OR 154	
Hopewell	14.36	23.11	OR 221	
1.000 mi = 1.609 km; 1.000 km = 0.621 mi: Concurrency terminus
