= Oregon Route 238 =

State highway in southwestern Oregon, US

Oregon Route 238
- Route 238highlighted in red

Route information
- Maintained by ODOT
- Length: 38.93 mi (62.65 km)
- Existed: 1935–present

Major junctions
- West end: US 199 / OR 99 in Grants Pass
- East end: OR 62 / OR 99 in Medford

Location
- Country: United States
- State: Oregon
- Counties: Jackson, Josephine

Highway system
- Oregon Highways; Interstate; US; State; Named; Scenic
← OR 237	→ OR 240

Oregon Route 238 is an Oregon state highway which runs between the cities of Grants Pass, Oregon and Medford, Oregon, and through the historic town of Jacksonville. It is known as the Jacksonville Highway No. 272 (see Oregon highways and routes), and is 39 miles (63 km) long. It lies in Jackson and Josephine County.

== Route description ==
OR 238 begins, at its western terminus, at an interchange with U.S. Route 199 and Oregon Route 99 in Grants Pass. The highway heads south from there, eventually turning to the southeast, skirting the southern edge of the Rogue Valley, and the foothills of the Siskiyou Mountains. It continues in a general southeasterly direction for quite a while, and then turns northeast towards Jacksonville. In Jacksonville, OR 238 is contiguous with West and East California Street, then turns north at North 5th Street. Approaching the western outskirts of Medford, the highway originally turned at West Main Street and terminated at U.S. Route 99. The new route does not turn east at West Main Street, but continues north contiguous with Hanley Road, then turns east at Rossanley Drive. When Rossanley Drive ends at Sage Road, OR 238 continues northeast until it reaching its eastern terminus at an intersection with Oregon Route 99 (North Pacific Highway), which is also the western terminus of Oregon Route 62.

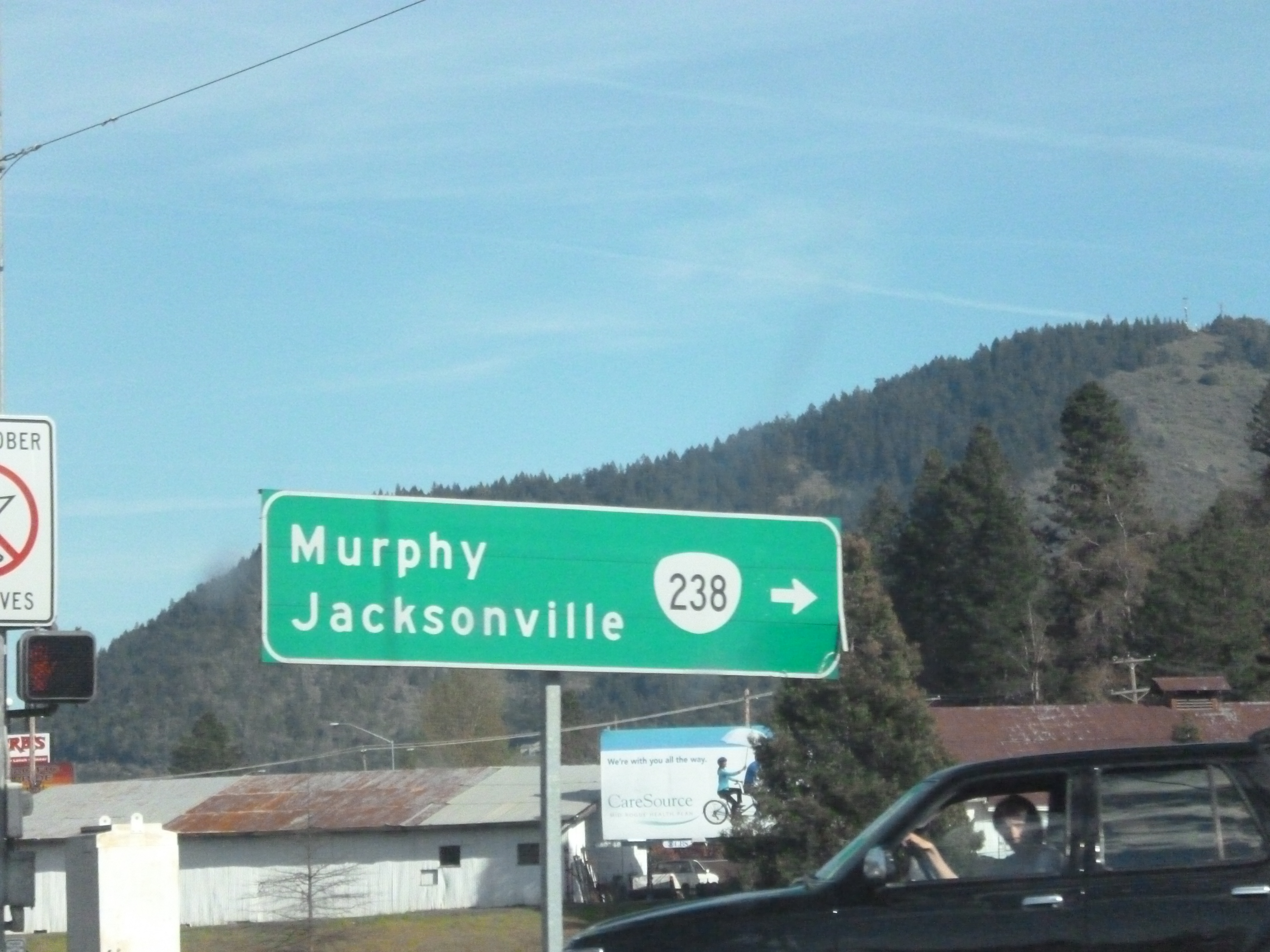
Sign showing start of Oregon 238 in Grants Pass.

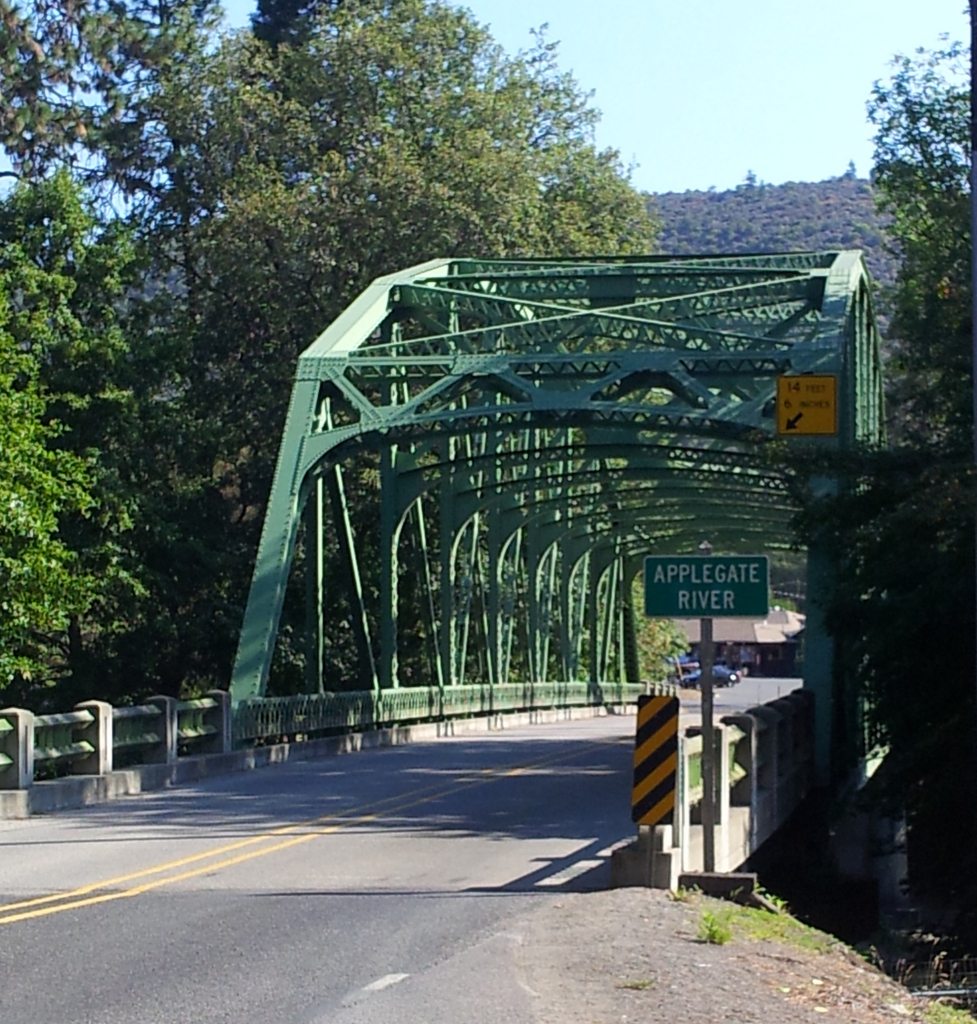
This photo was taken on September 1, 2012, of the Applegate Bridge on west bound Oregon Highway 238.

== Major intersections ==
County	Location	mi	km	Destinations	Notes
Jackson	Medford	38.75	62.36	OR 99 / OR 62 east to OR 140 / I-5 – Central Point, Rogue Valley Mall, Crater Lake, Medford City Center	
Josephine	Grants Pass	0.00	0.00	OR 99 / US 199 – Medford, Rogue Community College, Cave Junction, Crescent City, Grants Pass, Portland	
1.000 mi = 1.609 km; 1.000 km = 0.621 mi
