= Pixieland (Oregon) =

Defunct amusement park in the U.S. state of Oregon

- Interactive map of Pixieland
- Location: Otis Junction, Oregon, U.S.
- Coordinates: 45.0205°N 123.9654°W
- Status: Defunct
- Opened: 1969
- Closed: 1975

Pixieland was an amusement park near Otis Junction, Oregon, United States, located about three miles (5 km) north of Lincoln City. The park was opened in 1969 and operated until 1975.

The name and theme of the park came from nearby Lincoln City. A popular restaurant there was named Pixie Kitchen, which opened in 1930 and had the slogan "Heavenly Food on the Oregon Coast". Jerry Parks and his wife Lu Parks ran Pixie Kitchen and announced in 1967 the vision of Pixieland as a 57-acre (230,000 m^{2}) "Fairytale Story of Oregon."

The park was dedicated by Oregon governor Tom McCall on June 28, 1969. More than $800,000 was invested, including two public stock offerings. Pixieland hired two former Disneyland employees: the director of music and director of special promotions.

Rides included a 2 ft (610 mm) narrow gauge train called Little Toot (later renamed Little Pixie) and a log flume. Entertainment was found at the Blue Bell Opera House where melodramas were performed. Other buildings and attractions included the Main Street Arcade, the Print Shop, The Shootout, and the Darigold Cheese Barn. Eating places included Fisher Scones and Franz Bread Rest Hut.

A 1975 headline in the Oregon Journal declared "Pixieland Dream Goes 'Poof!': Dreams of a multimillion dollar fantasy world shattered into a fiscal nightmare." After the park closed, the rides were sold and the buildings demolished. The Little Pixie (renamed Merriweather) and log flume rides were sold to Lagoon amusement park where they still operate today. For several decades, the Pixieland site was an RV park which transitioned into a trailer home park. As of 2008, a tide-gate house with a pink painted roof was the only trace of Pixieland.

Since the early 1980s, Siuslaw National Forest has been under mandate to restore the Salmon River estuary conditions which development of Pixieland partially disrupted with creek diversions and dikes. By 2011, the site had been completely restored back into its original wetland state.
