= Courthouse Square Park =

Urban park in Dayton, Oregon, US

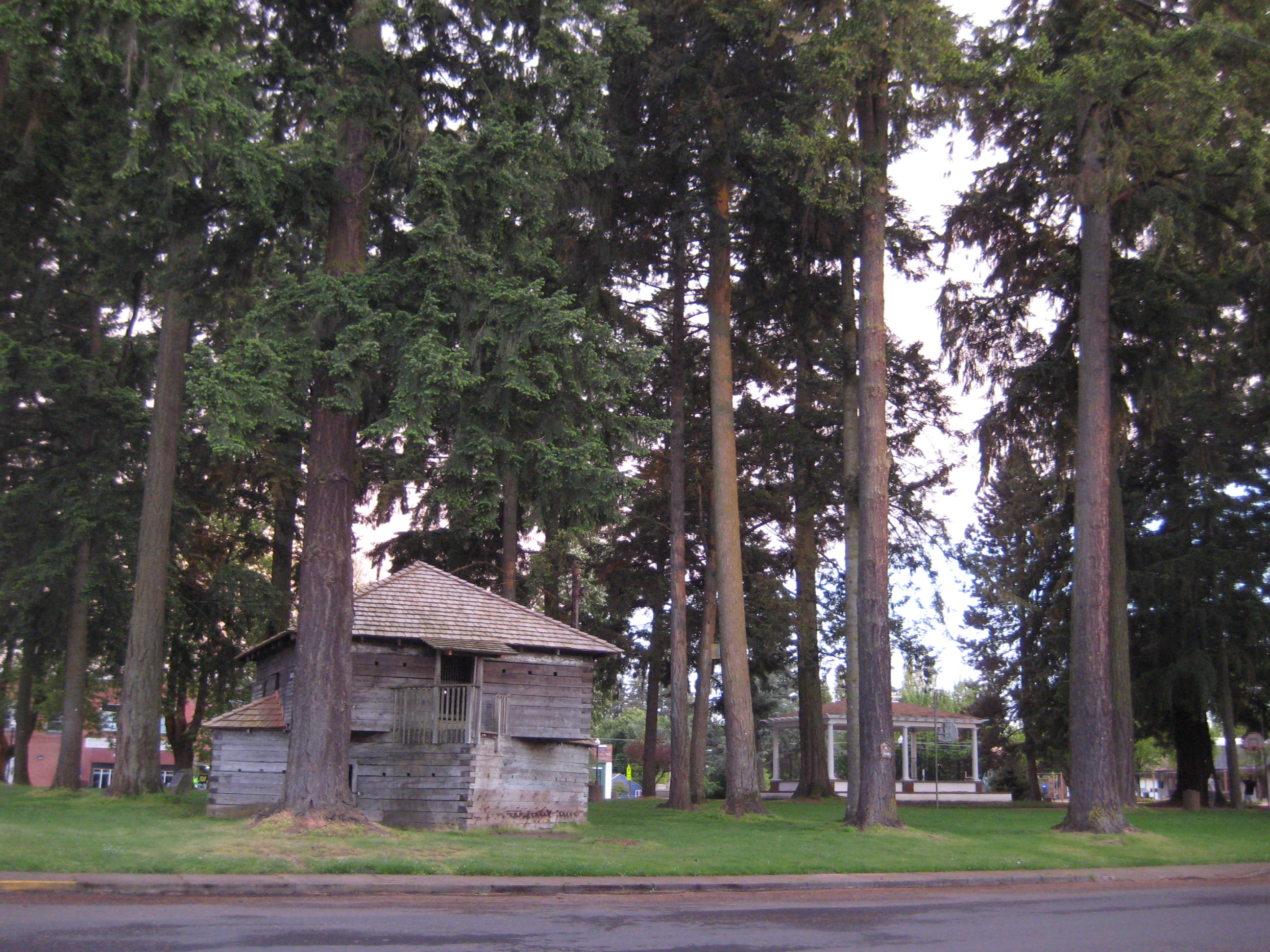
- Blockhouse and trees at the park

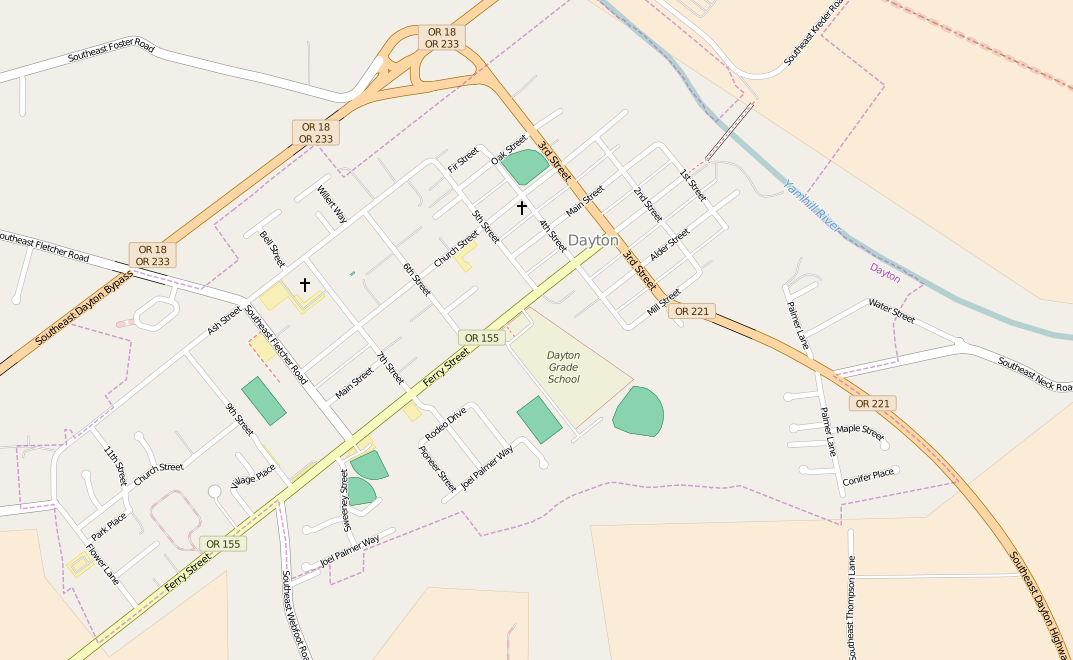
- Location within Oregon Location within Dayton OR
- Type: Public, city
- Location: Dayton, Oregon; United States
- Coordinates: 45°13′16″N 123°04′35″W
- Area: 1.8 acres (7,300 m^{2})
- Status: Open
- Courthouse Square
- U.S. National Register of Historic Places
- Location: Bounded by Third, Fourth, Ferry, and Main Sts., Dayton, Oregon
- Coordinates: 45°13′16″N 123°04′30″W
- Area: 1.8 acres (0.73 ha)
- Built: 1858
- MPS: Dayton MRA
- NRHP reference No.: 87000336
- Added to NRHP: March 16, 1987

Courthouse Square Park is a town square occupying one city block in downtown Dayton, Oregon. The 1.8 acres (0.73 ha) urban park is listed on the National Register of Historic Places. The park contains the historically significant blockhouse or military fortification that was originally located at Fort Yamhill. In 1911, the structure was moved to Dayton from its original site. The land for the park was donated by Joel Palmer and the park was named 'Courthouse Square' as part of an attempt to make Dayton the government seat of Yamhill County. Although Dayton did not become the county seat and no courthouse was ever constructed, the park's name remained. The Park also contains a picnic shelter, grassy areas shaded by Douglas Firs and native oaks, a basketball court, a playground and public restrooms.

== See also ==
- National Register of Historic Places listings in Yamhill County, Oregon
