= Oregon Route 154 =

State highway in Yamhill County, Oregon, US

Oregon Route 154
- Route 154 highlighted in red

Route information
- Maintained by ODOT
- Length: 5.74 mi (9.24 km)
- Existed: 2002–present

Major junctions
- South end: OR 153 near Hopewell
- North end: OR 233 in Dayton

Location
- Country: United States
- State: Oregon
- County: Yamhill

Highway system
- Oregon Highways; Interstate; US; State; Named; Scenic
← OR 153	→ OR 164

Oregon Route 154 is an Oregon state highway running from OR 233 near Dayton to OR 153 near Hopewell. OR 154 is composed of most of the Lafayette Highway No. 154 (see Oregon highways and routes). It is 5.74 miles (9.24 km) long and runs north–south, entirely within Yamhill County.

OR 154 was established in 2002 as part of Oregon's project to assign route numbers to highways that previously were not assigned.

Despite the name, the Lafayette Highway does not actually reach Lafayette. However, a Yamhill County maintained "Lafayette Highway" continues past OR 18 to enter the city of Lafayette. Also, Yamhill County signs the portion of Oregon Route 153 east of the junction with OR 154 as "Lafayette Highway," as well.

== Route description ==
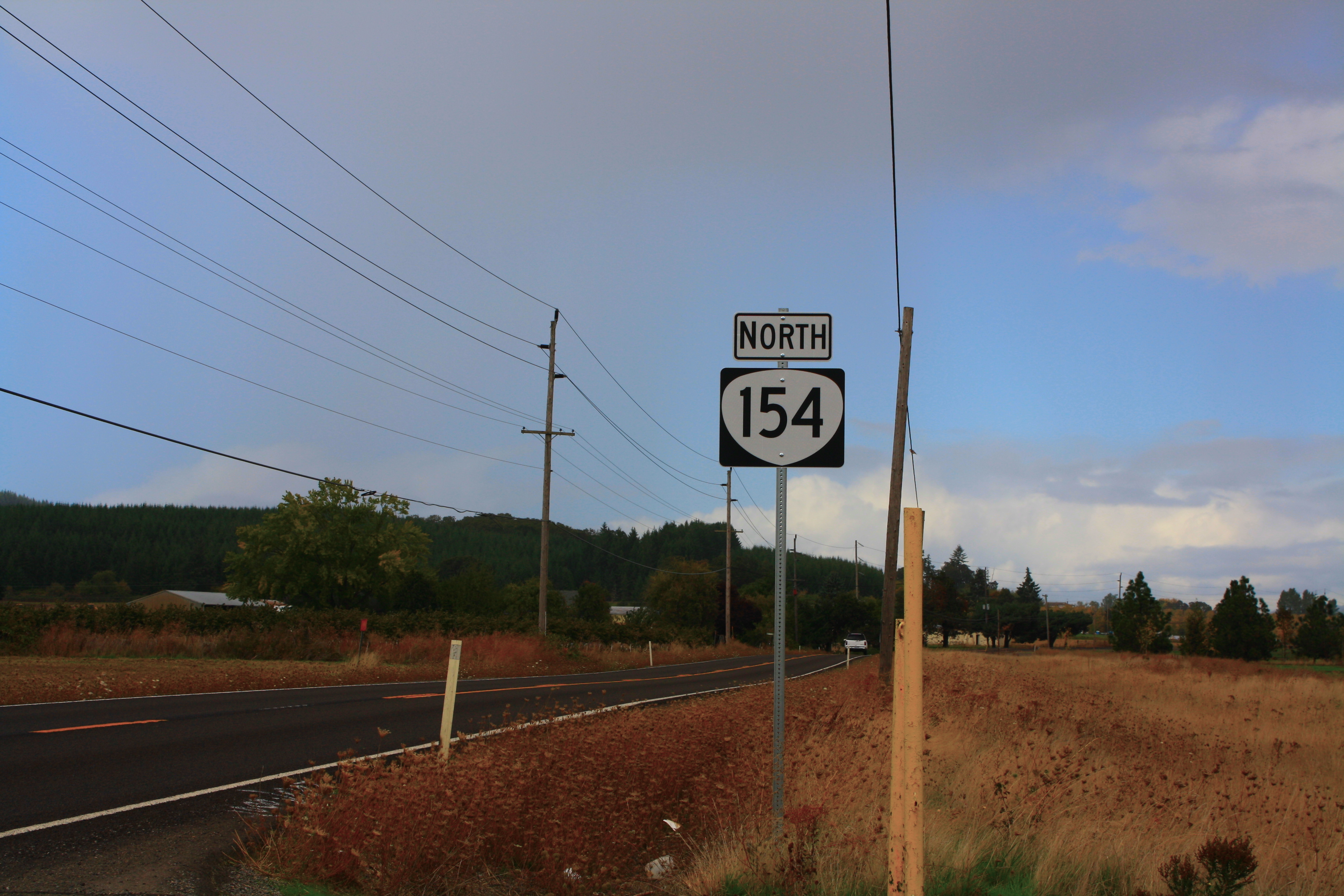
OR 154 shield on Lafayette Hwy

OR 154 begins at an intersection with OR 18 approximately one mile southwest of Dayton, several miles south of Lafayette. It heads south to an intersection with OR 153 near Hopewell, where it ends.

== History ==
OR 154 was assigned to the undesignated part of the Lafayette Highway in 2002.

== Major intersections ==
The entire route is in Yamhill County.

Location	mi	km	Destinations	Notes
Near Hopewell	0.00	0.00	OR 153	
Dayton	5.74	9.24	OR 233	
1.000 mi = 1.609 km; 1.000 km = 0.621 mi
