= Oregon Route 240 =

State highway in Yamhill County, Oregon, US

Oregon Route 240
- Route 240 highlighted in red

Route information
- Maintained by ODOT
- Length: 11.50 mi (18.51 km)

Major junctions
- West end: OR 47 in Yamhill
- East end: OR 99W in Newberg

Location
- Country: United States
- State: Oregon
- County: Yamhill

Highway system
- Oregon Highways; Interstate; US; State; Named; Scenic
← OR 238	→ OR 241

Oregon Route 240 is a short highway, running about 11 miles (18 km) from Newberg to Yamhill. It has medium traffic and it is to the southwest of the Portland metropolitan area. It is also known as the Tollgate Highway and is sometimes closed in winter during periods of bad weather.

OR 240 is known as the Yamhill-Newberg Highway No. 151 (see Oregon highways and routes).

== Route description ==
Oregon Route 240 begins at the intersection of Oregon Route 47 and Main Street in Yamhill. Merging with East Main Street, the highway leaves Yamhill, continuing eastward through farmland and arrives in Newberg, merging with North Main Street for just over 6 blocks. It stops there at the intersection with Oregon Route 99W.

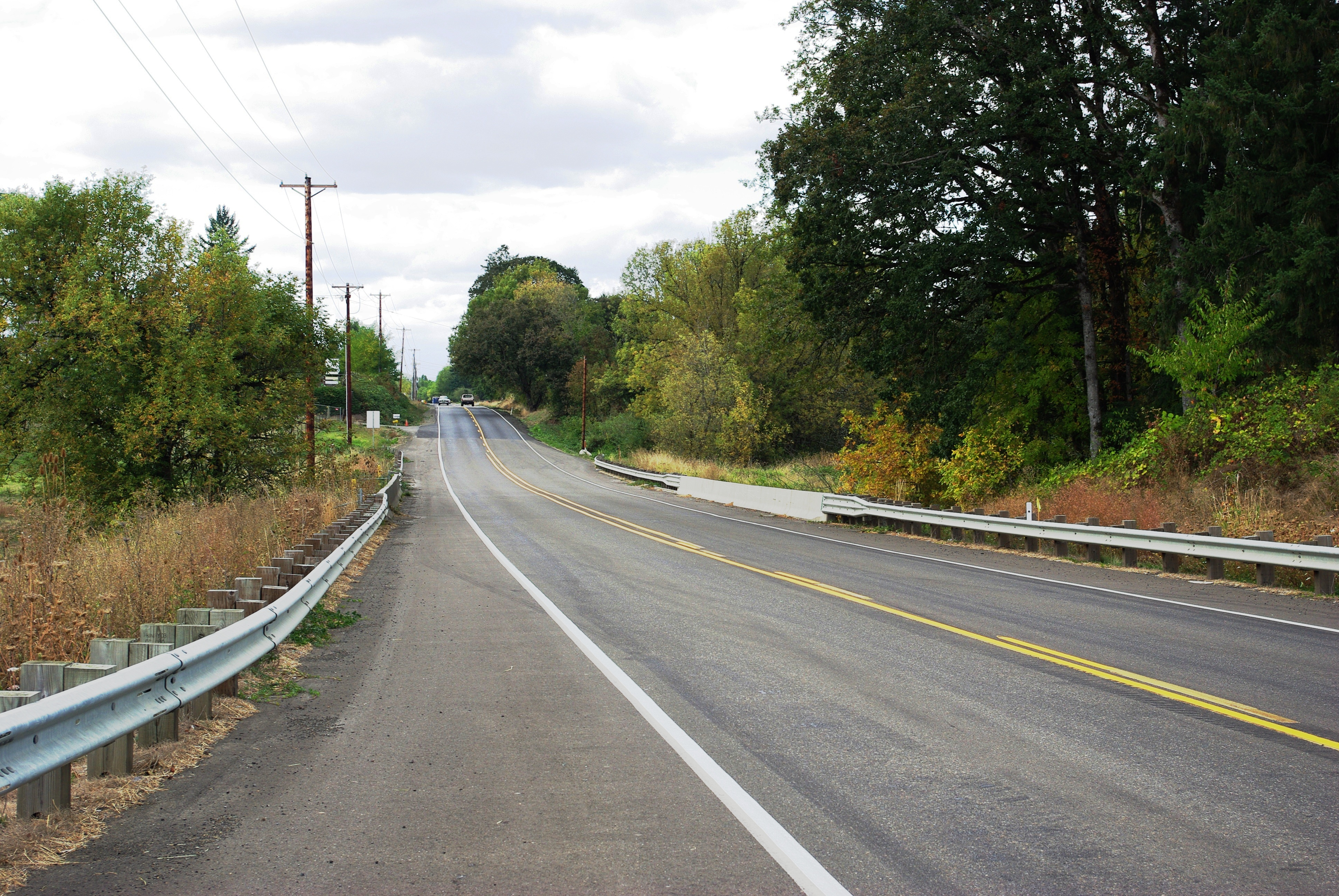
The road west of Newberg looking west

== Major intersections ==
The entire route is in Yamhill County.

Location	mi	km	Destinations	Notes
Yamhill	0.00	0.00	OR 47 – Carlton, McMinnville, Forest Grove	
Newberg	11.45	18.43	OR 99W south – McMinnville	One-way couplet
Newberg	11.50	18.51	OR 99W north – Portland, Salem	One-way couplet
1.000 mi = 1.609 km; 1.000 km = 0.621 mi
