= Fort Yamhill =

Former Army post in Oregon, US

- Polk County, Oregon, U.S.
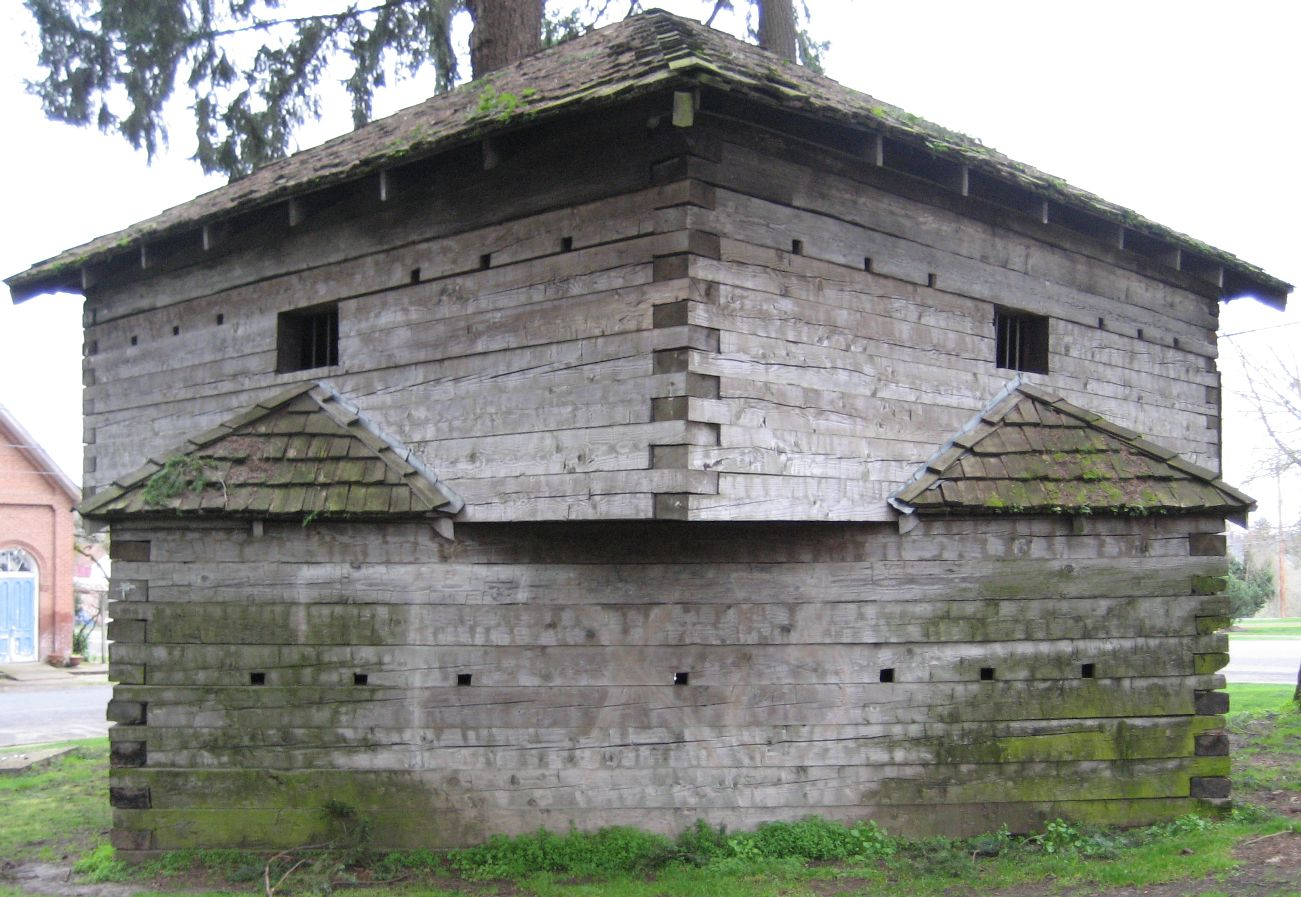
- The original blockhouse from Fort Yamhill located in Courthouse Square Park in Dayton, Oregon.

Site information
- Type: Military base
- Owner: United States
- Controlled by: United States Army

Location
- Coordinates: 45.068952°N 123.570056°W

Site history
- Built: 1856
- In use: 1856-1866
- Materials: wood
- Demolished: 1866

Garrison information
- Past commanders: Philip Sheridan
- Fort Yamhill Site
- U.S. National Register of Historic Places
- Location within Oregon Location within the United States
- Nearest city: Willamina, Oregon
- Area: 54.4 acres (22.0 ha)
- Built: 1856
- NRHP reference No.: 71000681
- Added to NRHP: July 27, 1971

Fort Yamhill was an American military fortification in the state of Oregon. Built in 1856 in the Oregon Territory, it remained an active post until 1866. The Army outpost was used to provide a presence next to the Grand Ronde Agency Coastal Reservation. Several officers stationed at the United States Army post prior to the American Civil War would later serve as generals in that war.

== Construction ==
Built in Polk County, Oregon, the outpost consisted of a wooden blockhouse, sentry box, barracks, officers’ quarters, carpenter's shop, hospital, cook houses, blacksmith shop, tables, barn, sutler's store, and laundress quarters. The wood blockhouse was built to provide a refuge to settlers of the area in case of attack by the Native Americans. After the fort was abandoned the block house was moved from the hill it was positioned on and served as a jail in the Valley Junction area, and later moved about 30 miles (48 km) east to Dayton.

Total cost to build the fort was $36,053. The post's first troops were under the command of William Babcock Hazen. This garrison consisted of 76 men under three officers, but was reduced in 1858 to two officers and 33 enlisted men.

== Notable people ==
Company D of the Fourth California Infantry took over at the fort on November 11, 1861 under the command of Lyman S. Scott. They replaced the Ninth Infantry that was commanded by 1st Lieutenant Philip A. Owen. For a time between September 1863 and October 1864 the post was under the command of 2nd Lieutenant James Davison.

- General Philip Sheridan was posted at the fort until the outbreak of the American Civil War and supervised the construction. At the time he was only a lieutenant in the U.S. Army. Sheridan commanded Fort Yamhill from June 26, 1857 to July 31, 1857, and from June 26, 1861 to September 1, 1861 and was promoted to the rank of captain on May 14, 1861.
- Also posted at Fort Yamhill was corporal Royal A. Bensell whose journals became the award-winning book, All Quiet on the Yamhill: The Civil War in Oregon by Royal A. Bensell. Edited by Gunter Barth.
- Civil War generals Joseph Hooker, Joseph Wheeler, and David Allen Russell all served at the fort.

== Legacy ==
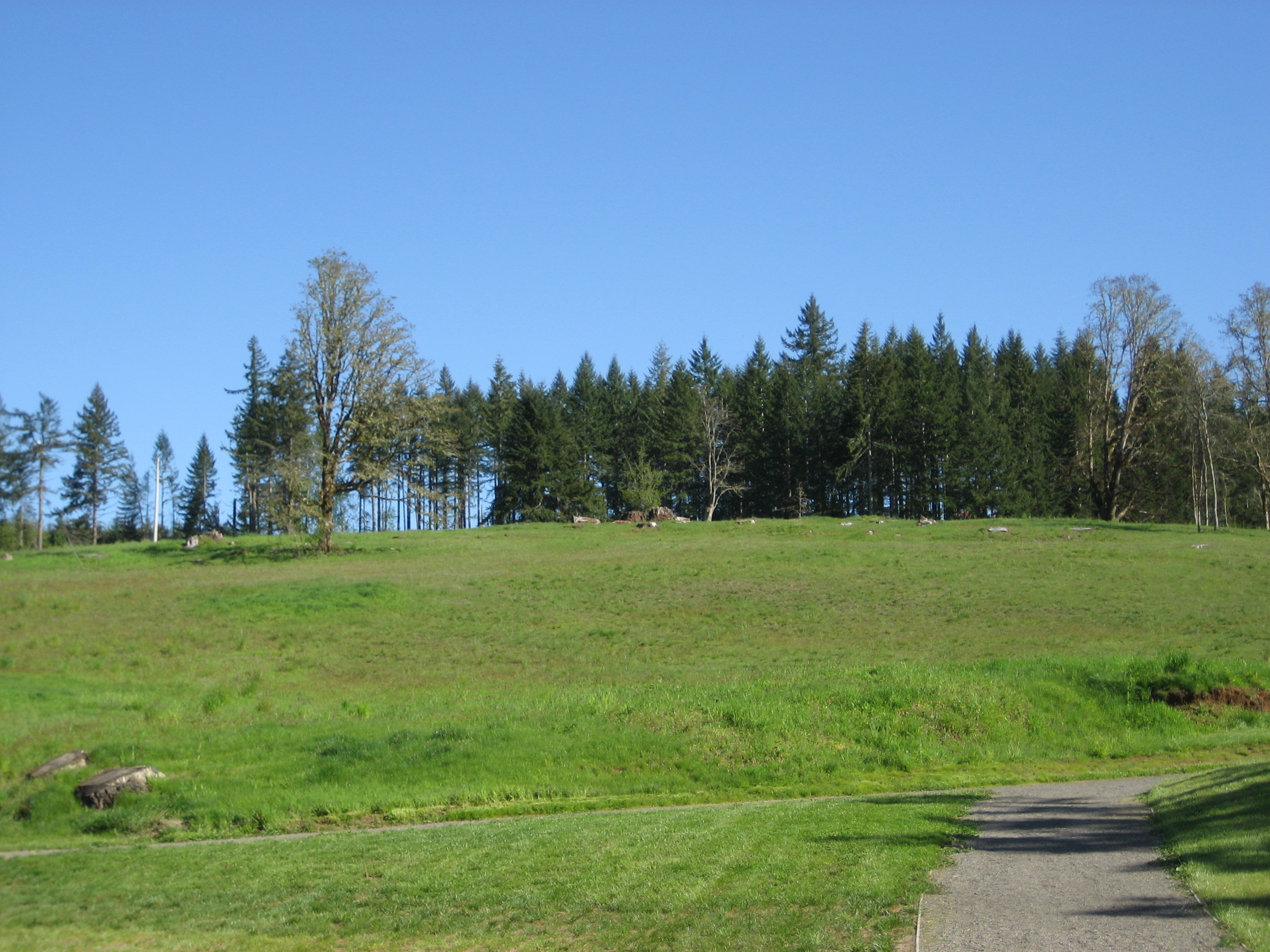
The hill at Fort Yamhill in 2007

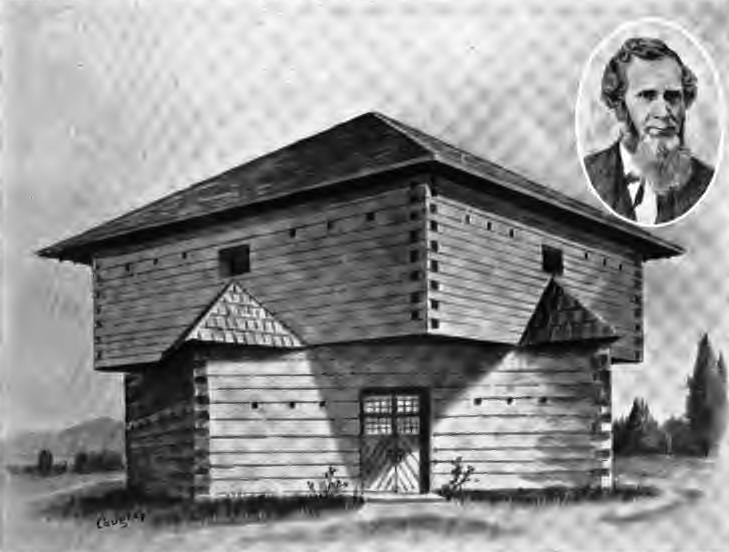
Sketch of Fort Yamhill with Joel Palmer inset

The blockhouse of the fort was moved to a park in downtown Dayton in 1911 to honor city founder Joel Palmer. The actual site of the fort grounds, which is in the Willamina vicinity, has been listed on the National Register of Historic Places since 1971. The address of the site is withheld, however the Oregon Parks and Recreation Department runs the undeveloped Fort Yamhill State Heritage Area in partnership with Polk County and the Confederated Tribes of the Grand Ronde. As there are no remaining buildings at the fort grounds except a relocated Officer's Quarters building, the parks department plans to reconstruct some of the fort buildings, including a new blockhouse.

In 2005 and 2013, Fort Yamhill served as the site for the Oregon State University historical archaeology field school. Students worked to uncover the foundations of Fort-era buildings.

== See also ==
- Fort Hoskins
- Fort Dalles
