= Oregon Route 221 =

State highway in northwestern Oregon, US

Oregon Route 221
- Route 221 highlighted in red

Route information
- Maintained by ODOT
- Length: 20.74 mi (33.38 km)

Major junctions
- South end: OR 22 in Salem
- OR 153 near Hopewell
- North end: OR 18 / OR 233 in Dayton

Location
- Country: United States
- State: Oregon
- Counties: Polk, Yamhill

Highway system
- Oregon Highways; Interstate; US; State; Named; Scenic
← OR 219	→ OR 222

Oregon Route 221 is an Oregon state highway which runs between the city of Salem, Oregon and the city of Dayton, Oregon, roughly along the western shore of the Willamette River. It is known as the Salem-Dayton Highway No. 150 (see Oregon highways and routes), and is 21 miles (34 km) long. It lies in Yamhill and Polk Counties.

== Route description ==
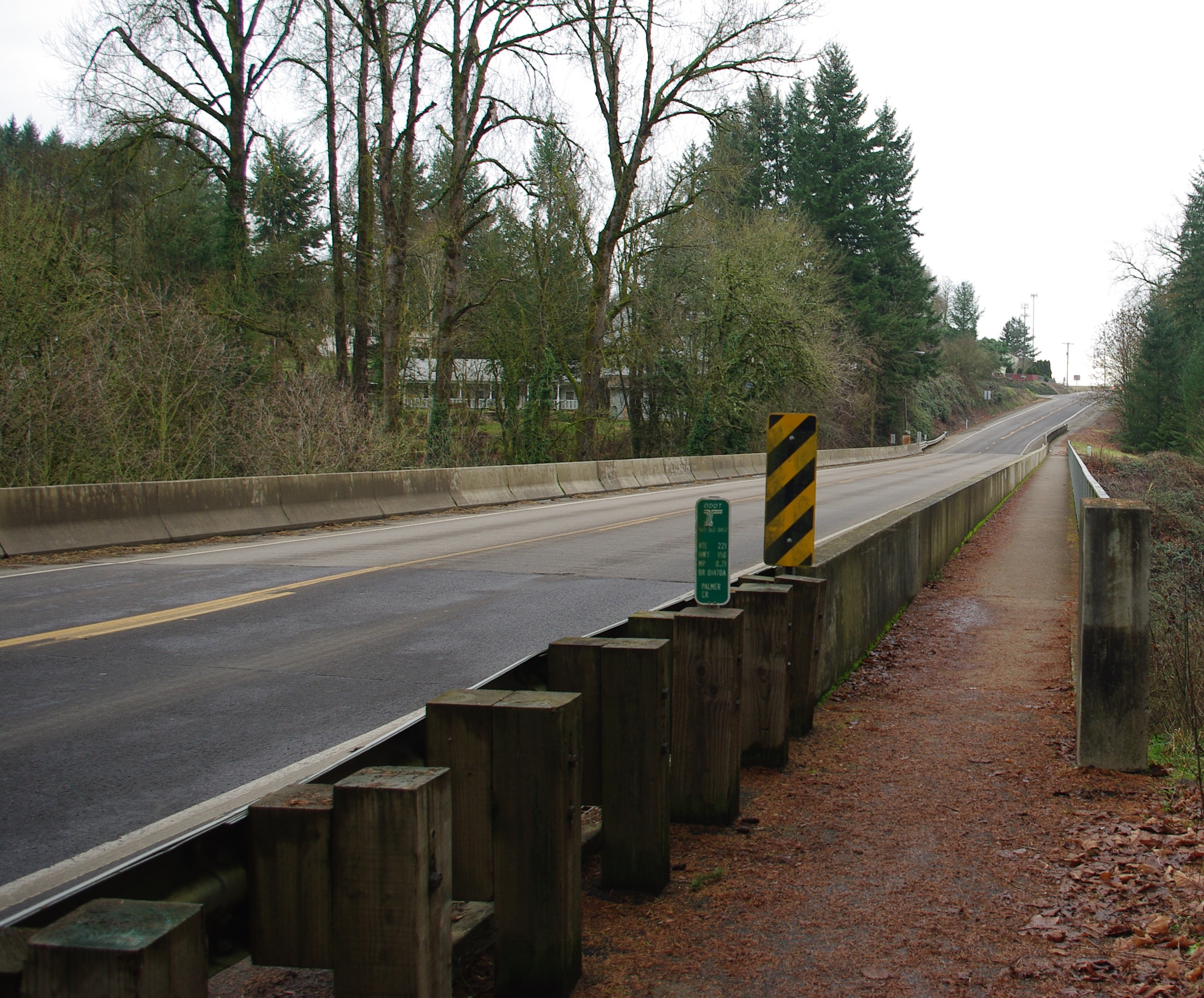
The highway at Dayton

OR 221 begins, at its southern terminus, at an interchange with OR 22 in Salem, just west of the Marion Street Bridge. This intersection is a partial interchange connecting OR 221 directly only to and from downtown Salem. To connect to OR 22 westbound one must turn onto Edgewater Street and travel about a mile to the highway entrance. To connect to OR 221 from eastbound OR 22 is more confusing as one must leave OR 22 at the Edgewater Street exit at the west end of Salem, and travel on that street about one mile to Patterson Street. One must turn left (north) there, turn right (east) onto 7th Street, continue to Taggart Drive, and finally make a left (north) onto Wallace Road (OR 221).

From the intersection with OR 22 in Salem the highway heads northwest, as an urban expressway known locally as Wallace Road; upon leaving the Salem area it becomes a 2-lane country road, which roughly parallels the Willamette River to the east. In some locations, the highway is right on the river's shore; in others it is some distance inland.

The highway continues north, into Yamhill County. It passes near the community of Hopewell and through Dayton, terminating at an interchange with OR 18 and OR 233 just north of Dayton. The last stretch of the highway, in Dayton, runs parallel to the Yamhill River, which empties into the Willamette just east of Dayton.

== Major intersections ==
County	Location	mi	km	Destinations	Notes
Polk	Salem	20.74	33.38	OR 22 – Salem, Dallas	
Yamhill		9.26	14.90	Bellevue–Hopewell Highway No. 153 west – Hopewell, Lafayette, McMinnville	
Yamhill	Dayton	0.48	0.77	Ferry Street (Amity–Dayton Highway No. 155 south) – Amity	
Yamhill	Dayton	0.00	0.00	OR 18 / OR 233 (Dayton Bypass) – McMinnville, Newberg, Portland, Corvallis	
1.000 mi = 1.609 km; 1.000 km = 0.621 mi
