= Otis Junction, Oregon =

Unincorporated community in Lincoln County, Oregon, U.S.

Coordinates: 45.019275°N 123.948446°W

Otis Junction is an unincorporated community in Lincoln County, Oregon, United States, at the junction of the former route of U.S. Route 101 and Oregon Route 18, a half mile south of Otis. It is a mile and a half east of where OR 18 intersects with the modern route of U.S. 101.

Otis Junction was the site of the James Beard Award-winning Otis Café. The café had been at this location since the 1920s, until it burned down in 2019. Pixieland, a former amusement park, was also located a mile west of Otis Junction, near U.S. 101 until it was shut down in 1975.
