= Bellevue, Oregon =

Unincorporated community in the state of Oregon, United States

Bellevue
- Unincorporated community
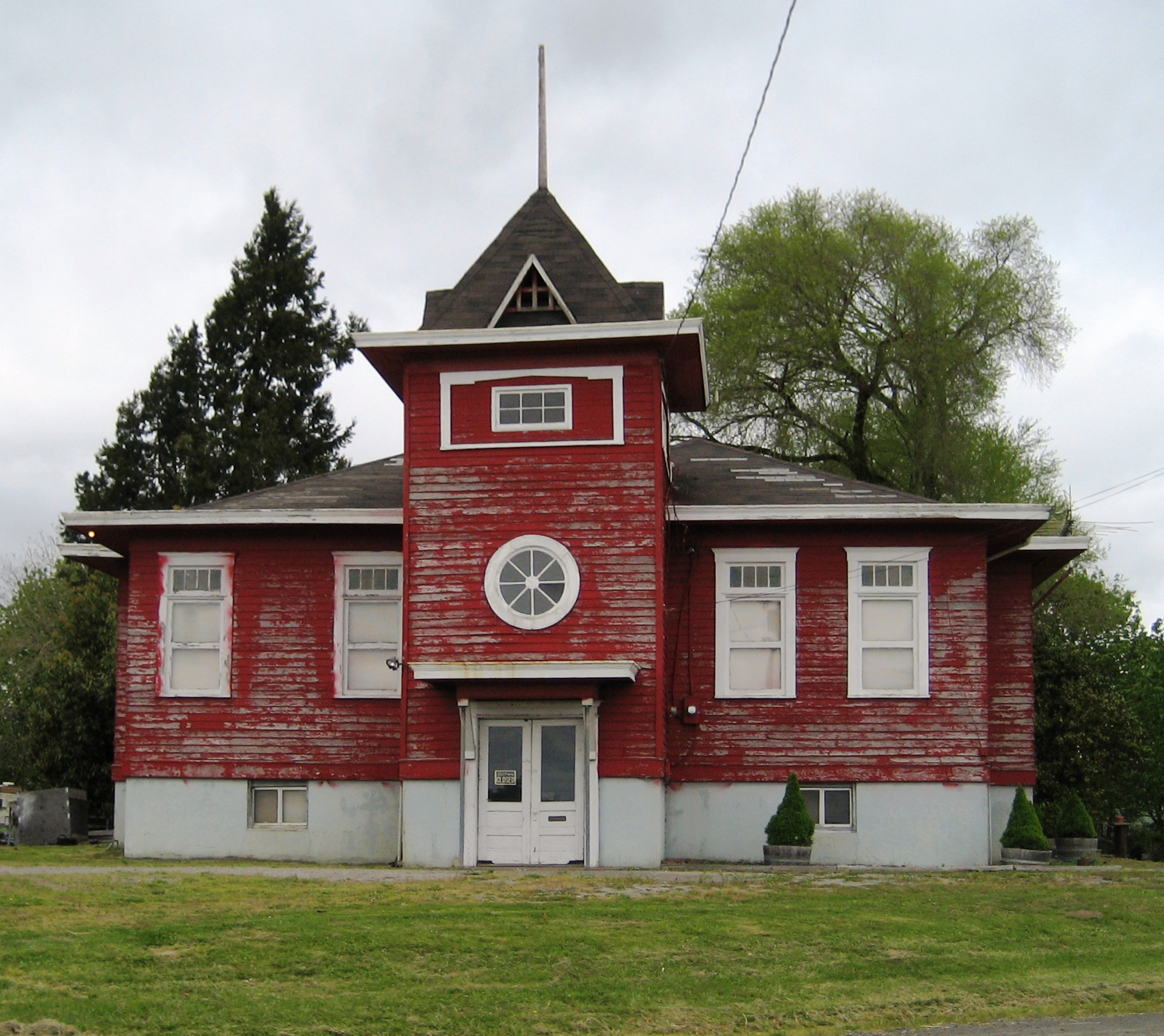
- Former school building

- Location within the state of Oregon Bellevue (the United States)
- Coordinates: 45°06′55″N 123°18′58″W
- Country: United States
- State: Oregon
- County: Yamhill
- Elevation: 197 ft (60 m)
- Time zone: UTC-8 (Pacific (PST))
  - Summer (DST): UTC-7 (PDT)
- GNIS feature ID: 1162838

Bellevue is an unincorporated rural community in Yamhill County, Oregon, United States. It is named for the French words for "beautiful view". It is not known who named the community, but it was settled c. 1860, and a previous post office in the area was named "Muddy". The community is located on the donation land claim of Hathaway Yocum, who came to Oregon from Illinois in 1851. Bellevue post office operated from 1869 to 1904.

== Geography ==
Bellevue is located on Oregon Route 18, eight miles (13 km) south of McMinnville and four miles (6.4 km) north of Sheridan. Bellevue is also the western terminus of the Bellevue-Hopewell Highway.

== Education ==
The land to build the first school for Bellevue School District 51 was deeded by Thomas Morris in 1872. The first Bellevue schoolhouse was one-roomed, built around the time the land was deeded. This schoolhouse was in use until a new two-room school was built in 1917. After 1939, Bellevue began transporting seventh and eighth grade students to McMinnville School District 40. In 1942, all students began to be sent to Sheridan School District 48, until, in 1948, all students were sent to District 40. In 1950, Bellevue eventually consolidated with District 40. The school is still in existence, though it has been converted to other uses.
