= Dayton, Oregon =

Town in Oregon, U.S.

- City
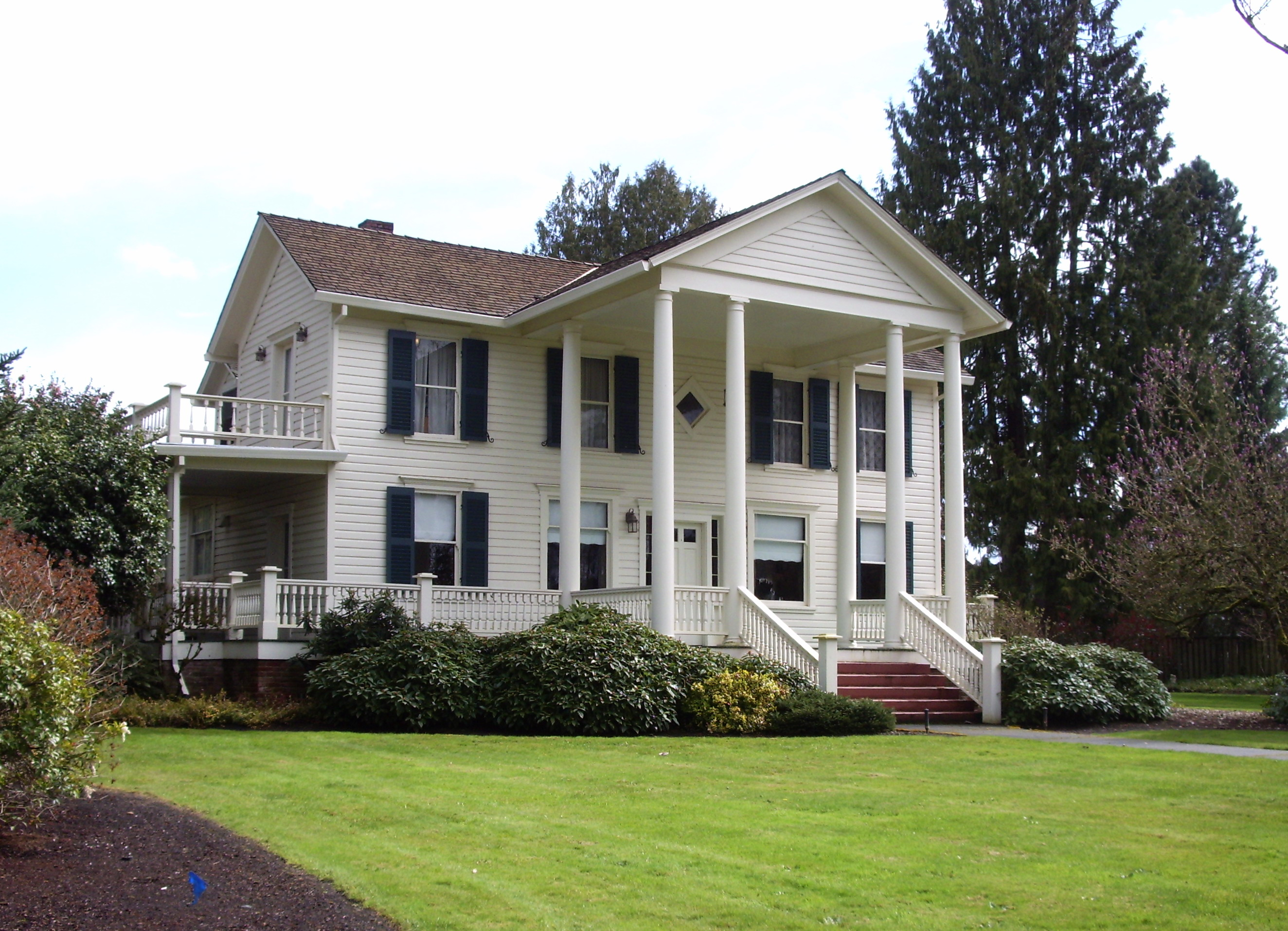
- Joel Palmer House

- Location in Oregon

- Location within Oregon Location within the United States
- Coordinates: 45°13′11″N 123°04′41″W
- Country: United States
- State: Oregon
- County: Yamhill
- Incorporated: 1880

Government
  - Mayor: Annette Frank

Area
  - Total: 0.84 sq mi (2.17 km^{2})
  - Land: 0.84 sq mi (2.17 km^{2})
  - Water: 0 sq mi (0.00 km^{2})
- Elevation: 161 ft (49 m)

Population (2020)
  - Total: 2,678
  - Density: 3,202.6/sq mi (1,236.55/km^{2})
- Time zone: UTC-8 (Pacific)
  - Summer (DST): UTC-7 (Pacific)
- ZIP code: 97114
- Area code: 503
- FIPS code: 41-18250
- GNIS feature ID: 2410299
- Website: www.daytonoregon.gov

Dayton is a city in Yamhill County, Oregon, United States. The population was 2,678 at the 2020 census.

== History ==
The city was founded in 1850 by Andrew Smith and Joel Palmer. Palmer, who also served as superintendent of Indian affairs for Oregon, built a flour mill there. Dayton was named for Smith's hometown, Dayton, Ohio. Dayton post office was opened in 1851, with Christopher Taylor serving as postmaster.

There are many historic landmarks throughout the city. The oldest standing structure is the Joel Palmer House, built in 1852 or 1857. It has been on the National Register of Historic Places since March 16, 1987, and has been painstakingly restored. Since 1996, it has been home to a four-star restaurant of the same name as the historic house.

Nearby, in Courthouse Square Park, is the Fort Yamhill Block House, which was brought to Dayton in 1911 to prevent its demolition. The structure had been built by Willamette Valley settlers on Fort Hill next to the Grand Ronde Coastal Reservation in 1855 and 1856. John G. Lewis, a citizen of Dayton, secured permission from authorities to move the logs to Dayton, where they were reassembled.

== Geography ==
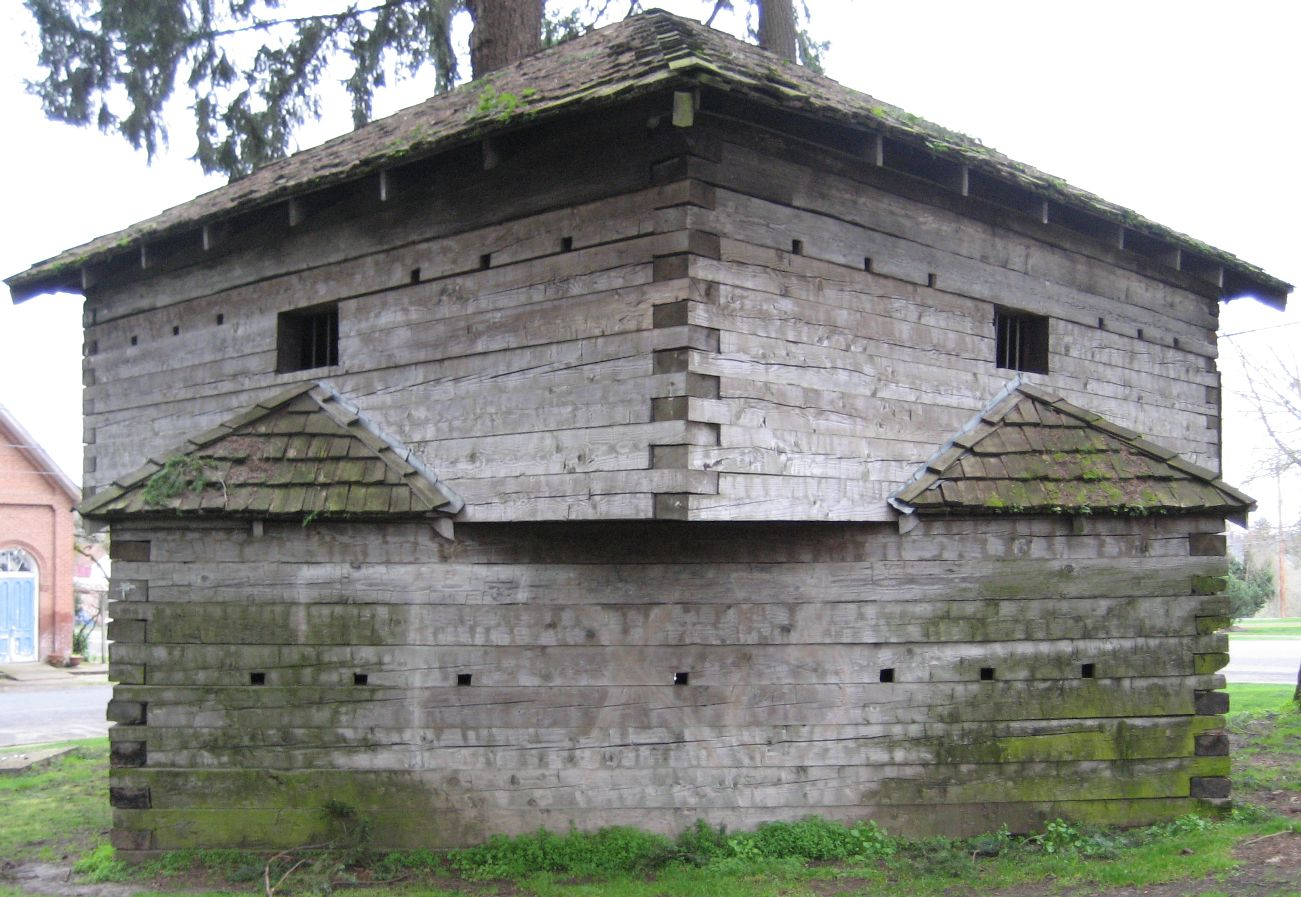
Fort Yamhill blockhouse, in Courthouse Square Park

Dayton is located in the Willamette Valley, approximately 25 miles (40 km) southwest of Portland and seven miles (11 km) east of McMinnville.

According to the United States Census Bureau, the city has a total area of 0.84 square miles (2.18 km^{2}), all of it land.

== Demographics ==
Historical population
Census	Pop.	Note	%±
1880	368		—
1890	304		−17.4%
1900	293		−3.6%
1910	453		54.6%
1920	448		−1.1%
1930	375		−16.3%
1940	506		34.9%
1950	719		42.1%
1960	673		−6.4%
1970	949		41.0%
1980	1,409		48.5%
1990	1,526		8.3%
2000	2,119		38.9%
2010	2,534		19.6%
2020	2,678		5.7%
U.S. Decennial Census

=== 2020 census ===
As of the 2020 census, Dayton had a population of 2,678. The median age was 34.8 years. 26.8% of residents were under the age of 18 and 12.2% of residents were 65 years of age or older. For every 100 females there were 93.5 males, and for every 100 females age 18 and over there were 91.2 males age 18 and over.

100.0% of residents lived in urban areas, while 0% lived in rural areas.

There were 858 households in Dayton, of which 41.8% had children under the age of 18 living in them. Of all households, 57.1% were married-couple households, 12.8% were households with a male householder and no spouse or partner present, and 21.4% were households with a female householder and no spouse or partner present. About 15.3% of all households were made up of individuals and 6.9% had someone living alone who was 65 years of age or older.

There were 875 housing units, of which 1.9% were vacant. Among occupied housing units, 79.0% were owner-occupied and 21.0% were renter-occupied. The homeowner vacancy rate was 0.4% and the rental vacancy rate was 3.7%.

Racial composition as of the 2020 census
Race	Number	Percent
White	1,859	69.4%
Black or African American	13	0.5%
American Indian and Alaska Native	49	1.8%
Asian	18	0.7%
Native Hawaiian and Other Pacific Islander	2	0.1%
Some other race	380	14.2%
Two or more races	357	13.3%
Hispanic or Latino (of any race)	805	30.1%

=== 2010 census ===
As of the census of 2010, there were 2,534 people, 797 households, and 624 families living in the city. The population density was 3,016.7 inhabitants per square mile (1,164.8/km^{2}). There were 843 housing units at an average density of 1,003.6 per square mile (387.5/km^{2}). The racial makeup of the city was 79.2% White, 0.5% African American, 1.0% Native American, 0.9% Asian, 14.7% from other races, and 3.7% from two or more races. Hispanic or Latino of any race were 29.9% of the population.

There were 797 households, of which 48.6% had children under the age of 18 living with them, 58.8% were married couples living together, 14.1% had a female householder with no husband present, 5.4% had a male householder with no wife present, and 21.7% were non-families. 15.8% of all households were made up of individuals, and 6.2% had someone living alone who was 65 years of age or older. The average household size was 3.18 and the average family size was 3.52.

The median age in the city was 32.8 years. 32.6% of residents were under the age of 18; 7.8% were between the ages of 18 and 24; 26.6% were from 25 to 44; 22.9% were from 45 to 64; and 10.1% were 65 years of age or older. The gender makeup of the city was 49.6% male and 50.4% female.

=== 2000 census ===
As of the census of 2000, there were 2,119 people, 641 households, and 516 families living in the city. The population density was 2,935.4 inhabitants per square mile (1,133.4/km^{2}). There were 656 housing units at an average density of 908.7 per square mile (350.9/km^{2}). The racial makeup of the city was 80.70% White, 1.56% African American, 1.18% Native American, 0.52% Asian, 11.80% from other races, and 4.25% from two or more races. Hispanic or Latino of any race were 26.19% of the population.

There were 641 households, out of which 49.6% had children under the age of 18 living with them, 60.4% were married couples living together, 15.1% had a female householder with no husband present, and 19.5% were non-families. 15.4% of all households were made up of individuals, and 6.4% had someone living alone who was 65 years of age or older. The average household size was 3.31 and the average family size was 3.66.

In the city, the population was spread out, with 36.7% under the age of 18, 7.7% from 18 to 24, 30.2% from 25 to 44, 17.7% from 45 to 64, and 7.6% who were 65 years of age or older. The median age was 29 years. For every 100 females, there were 96.0 males. For every 100 females age 18 and over, there were 96.1 males.

The median income for a household in the city was $40,556, and the median income for a family was $43,047. Males had a median income of $32,500 versus $23,125 for females. The per capita income for the city was $13,140. About 11.7% of families and 14.1% of the population were below the poverty line, including 16.6% of those under age 18 and 12.5% of those age 65 or over.

== Economy ==
Dayton is a rural community, with many people involved in agriculture such as vegetable, berry, nut, nursery plants, wheat production and dairy farming. The vineyards and wineries located in the Willamette Valley AVA and the Dundee Hills AVA are an increasing source of direct economic activity as well as a source of visitors to the city.

=== Transportation ===
Dayton is served by three signed Oregon state highways and one unsigned state highway:

- Signed highways
  - Oregon Route 18
  - Oregon Route 221
  - Oregon Route 233, which travels as one road with State Route 18 between Lafayette Highway to the west and Oregon Route 99W to the east.
- Unsigned highway
  - Oregon Route 154 (SE Lafayette Highway) is assigned this route number south of its intersection with State Highway 233.

Prior to the construction of Highway 18 as a limited-access bypass of Dayton and McMinnville, Highway 233 continued east on its old route (SE Amity-Dayton Highway) into downtown Dayton, where it was named Ferry Street. The highway crossed the Yamhill River via ferry to the northeast side of the river at what is now called Alderman Park. There, Highway 233 continued northeast along SE Kreder Road to its northern terminus at what was then numbered as US Route 99W. During this period, the northern terminus of Highway 221 was located at its intersection with Ferry Street.

== Government ==
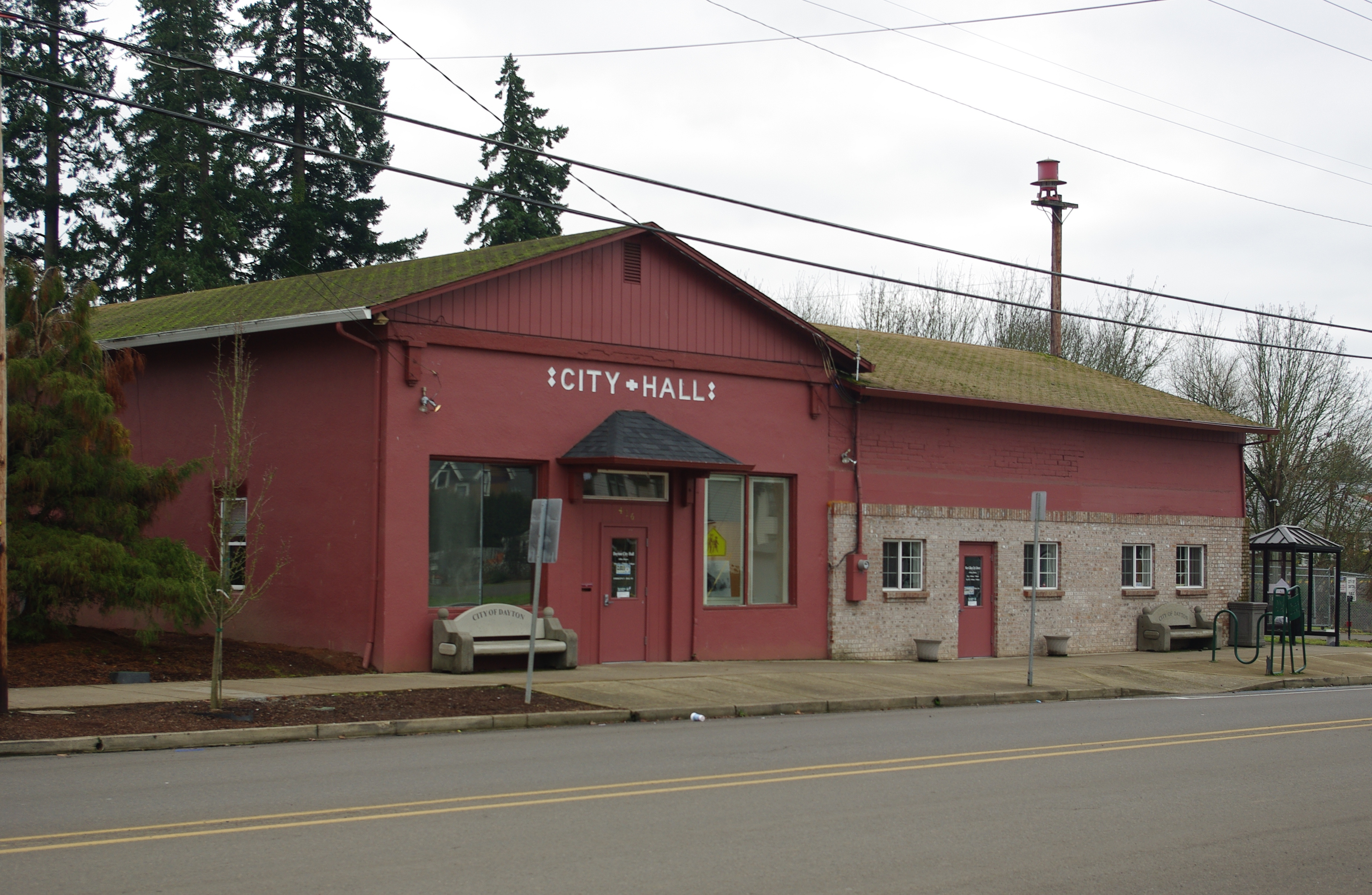
City Hall

Sometime in the late 19th century to early 20th century, land was donated for the construction of a city hall and library by a community member named Mary Gilkey. The current city hall and library used to be a firehouse. The library is part of the Chemeketa Cooperative Regional Library Service.

== Education ==
Dayton has three schools within the Dayton School District: Dayton Grade School, Dayton Jr. High School and Dayton High School. The school mascot is the Pirate.

== Notable people ==
- Dante Rosario, NFL player
- Dewey Sullivan, Dayton High School football coach; Oregon Sports Hall of Fame inductee
- Paige VanZant, UFC fighter

== See also ==
- National Register of Historic Places listings in Yamhill County, Oregon
