= Hopewell, Oregon =

Unincorporated community in the state of Oregon, United States

Hopewell
- Unincorporated community
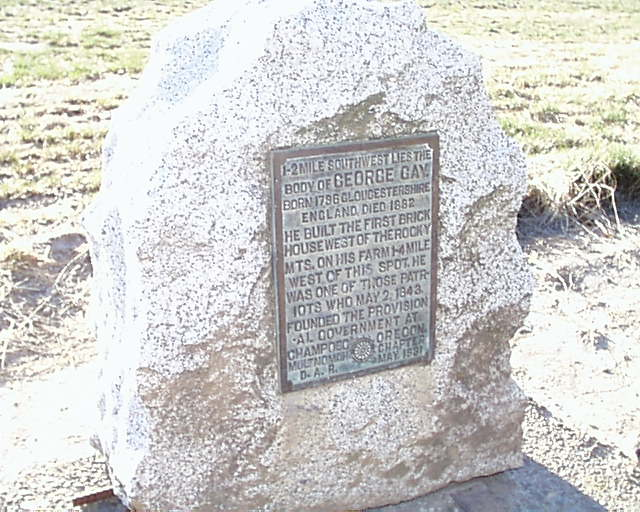
- Marker on Oregon Route 221 commemorating early Hopewell resident George Gay
- Interactive map of Hopewell
- Coordinates: 45°05′49″N 123°05′31″W
- Country: United States
- State: Oregon
- County: Yamhill
- Elevation: 164 ft (50 m)
- Time zone: UTC-8 (Pacific (PST))
  - Summer (DST): UTC-7 (PDT)
- ZIP code: 97304
- Area codes: 503 and 971
- GNIS feature ID: 1136392

Hopewell is an unincorporated community in Yamhill County, Oregon, United States. It is at the eastern terminus of Oregon Route 153, 10 miles (16 km) south of Dayton and a few miles west of Wheatland, at the east base of the Eola Hills.

Hopewell post office was established in 1897, and closed out to Amity in 1903. Hopewell is now served by the Salem post office. The name Hopewell does not appear in the gazetteers of the 1880s.

Hopewell was the home of George K. Gay, who voted in the May 1843 Champoeg Meeting that created the provisional government, and built the first brick residence in the state of Oregon near Hopewell in 1842. Gay's great-grandson, singer Johnnie Ray, spent his early years in Hopewell.
