= Amity, Oregon =

City in Oregon, U.S.

- City
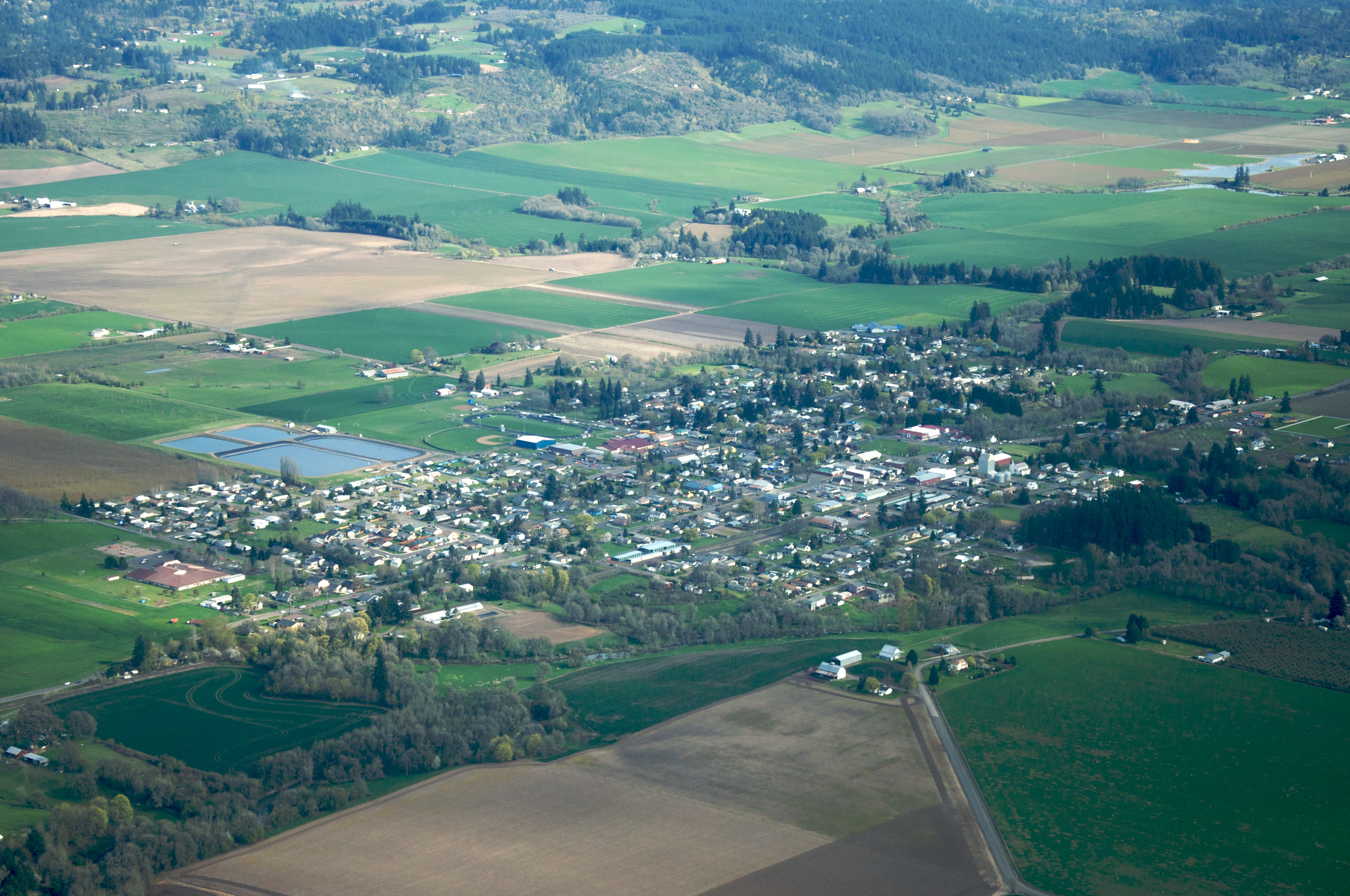
- Aerial view of Amity
- Motto: "Where Friendship Begins"
- Location in Oregon
- Coordinates: 45°06′56″N 123°12′12″W
- Country: United States
- State: Oregon
- County: Yamhill
- Incorporated: 1880

Government
  - Type: Mayor–council
  - Mayor: Rachel King

Area
  - Total: 0.60 sq mi (1.56 km^{2})
  - Land: 0.59 sq mi (1.54 km^{2})
  - Water: 0.0077 sq mi (0.02 km^{2})
- Elevation: 164 ft (50 m)

Population (2020)
  - Total: 1,757
  - Density: 2,958.2/sq mi (1,142.18/km^{2})
- Time zone: UTC-8 (Pacific)
  - Summer (DST): UTC-7 (Pacific)
- ZIP code: 97101
- Area code: 503
- FIPS code: 41-02000
- GNIS feature ID: 2409700
- Website: www.amityoregon.gov

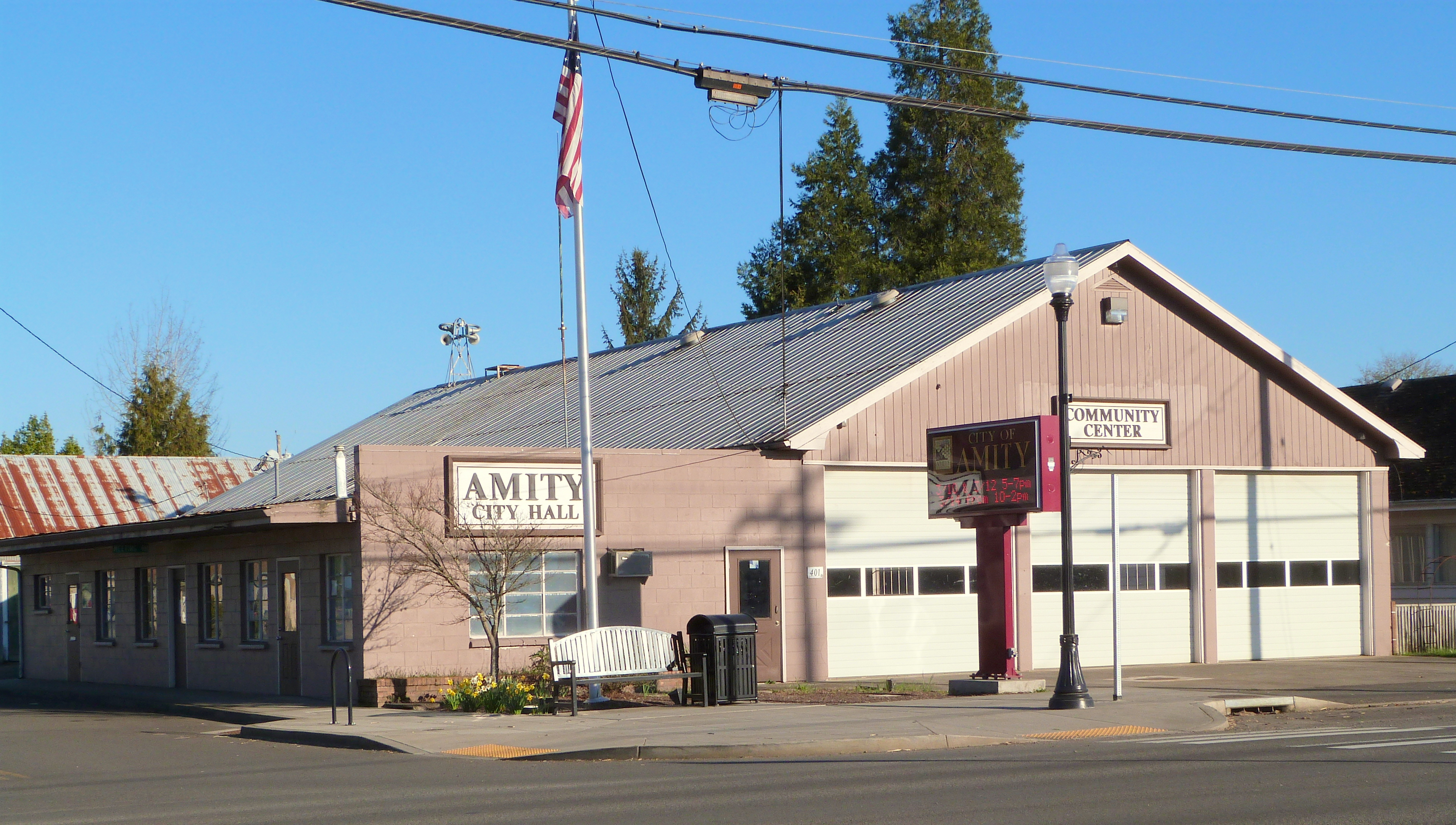
Amity City Hall

Amity is a city in Yamhill County, Oregon, United States. As of the 2020 Census, the population was 1,757.

== History ==
The town was established between 1848 and 1849 by Joseph and Ahio S. Watt, two brothers who had immigrated to Oregon over the Oregon Trail. Part of Joseph's land claim became the community's townsite. The name "Amity" came from the name of a school that was built by two rival communities after the amicable settlement of a dispute. Ahio, the first teacher, named the school. Amity post office was established in 1852. Joseph established the first woolen mill in Oregon, and in 1868 shipped wheat to England in the first instance of Oregon wheat being sent around Cape Horn. The community was incorporated by the Oregon Legislative Assembly on October 19, 1880, originally as a town.

== Geography ==
According to the United States Census Bureau, the city has a total area of 0.61 square miles (1.58 km^{2}), of which 0.60 square miles (1.55 km^{2}) is land and 0.01 square miles (0.03 km^{2}) is water.

== Demographics ==
Historical population
Census	Pop.	Note	%±
1900	292		—
1910	407		39.4%
1920	522		28.3%
1930	438		−16.1%
1940	545		24.4%
1950	672		23.3%
1960	620		−7.7%
1970	708		14.2%
1980	1,092		54.2%
1990	1,175		7.6%
2000	1,478		25.8%
2010	1,614		9.2%
2020	1,757		8.9%
2021 (est.)	1,809		3.0%
U.S. Decennial Census

=== 2020 census ===
As of the 2020 census, Amity had a population of 1,757, a median age of 34.1 years, 27.4% of residents under the age of 18, and 11.0% of residents 65 years of age or older. For every 100 females there were 100.1 males and for every 100 females age 18 and over there were 97.8 males age 18 and over.

0% of residents lived in urban areas, while 100.0% lived in rural areas.

There were 584 households in Amity, of which 41.8% had children under the age of 18 living in them. Of all households, 50.9% were married-couple households, 15.1% were households with a male householder and no spouse or partner present, and 23.6% were households with a female householder and no spouse or partner present. About 16.0% of all households were made up of individuals and 6.5% had someone living alone who was 65 years of age or older.

There were 621 housing units, of which 6.0% were vacant. Among occupied housing units, 66.3% were owner-occupied and 33.7% were renter-occupied. The homeowner vacancy rate was 2.5% and the rental vacancy rate was 3.9%.

Racial composition as of the 2020 census
Race	Number	Percent
White	1,384	78.8%
Black or African American	10	0.6%
American Indian and Alaska Native	37	2.1%
Asian	19	1.1%
Native Hawaiian and Other Pacific Islander	4	0.2%
Some other race	109	6.2%
Two or more races	194	11.0%
Hispanic or Latino (of any race)	282	16.1%

=== 2010 census ===
As of the census of 2010, there were 1,604 people, 538 households, and 411 families living in the city. The population density was 2,690.0 inhabitants per square mile (1,038.6/km^{2}). There were 574 housing units at an average density of 956.7 per square mile (369.4/km^{2}). The racial makeup of the city was 83.9% White, 0.7% African American, 2.5% Native American, 0.4% Asian, 0.2% Pacific Islander, 8.6% from other races, and 3.7% from two or more races. Hispanic or Latino of any race were 15.5% of the population.

There were 538 households, of which 45.2% had children under the age of 18 living with them, 55.8% were married couples living together, 13.0% had a female householder with no husband present, 7.6% had a male householder with no wife present, and 23.6% were non-families. 17.1% of all households were made up of individuals, and 5.7% had someone living alone who was 65 years of age or older. The average household size was 3.00 and the average family size was 3.34.

The median age in the city was 31.9 years. 31.5% of residents were under the age of 18; 8.1% were between the ages of 18 and 24; 29.4% were from 25 to 44; 23% were from 45 to 64; and 8.1% were 65 years of age or older. The gender makeup of the city was 50.1% male and 49.9% female.

=== 2000 census ===
As of the census of 2000, there were 1,478 people, 471 households, and 373 families living in the city. The population density was 2,461.0 inhabitants per square mile (950.2/km^{2}). There were 495 housing units at an average density of 824.2 per square mile (318.2/km^{2}). The racial makeup of the city was 90.73% White, 0.14% African American, 1.42% Native American, 0.68% Asian, 0.07% Pacific Islander, 5.01% from other races, and 1.96% from two or more races. Hispanic or Latino of any race were 11.50% of the population.

There were 471 households, out of which 45.4% had children under the age of 18 living with them, 61.6% were married couples living together, 11.7% had a female householder with no husband present, and 20.6% were non-families. 15.9% of all households were made up of individuals, and 6.2% had someone living alone who was 65 years of age or older. The average household size was 3.14 and the average family size was 3.42.

In the city, the population was spread out, with 33.8% under the age of 18, 9.5% from 18 to 24, 29.4% from 25 to 44, 18.7% from 45 to 64, and 8.7% who were 65 years of age or older. The median age was 30 years. For every 100 females, there were 101.4 males. For every 100 females age 18 and over, there were 99.6 males.

The median income for a household in the city was $40,556, and the median income for a family was $42,375. Males had a median income of $30,417 versus $25,662 for females. The per capita income for the city was $13,563. About 8.7% of families and 9.6% of the population were below the poverty line, including 9.7% of those under age 18 and 17.5% of those age 65 or over.

== See also ==
- Amity High School
- List of cities in Oregon
