= Ballston, Oregon =

Unincorporated community in the state of Oregon, United States

Ballston
- Unincorporated community
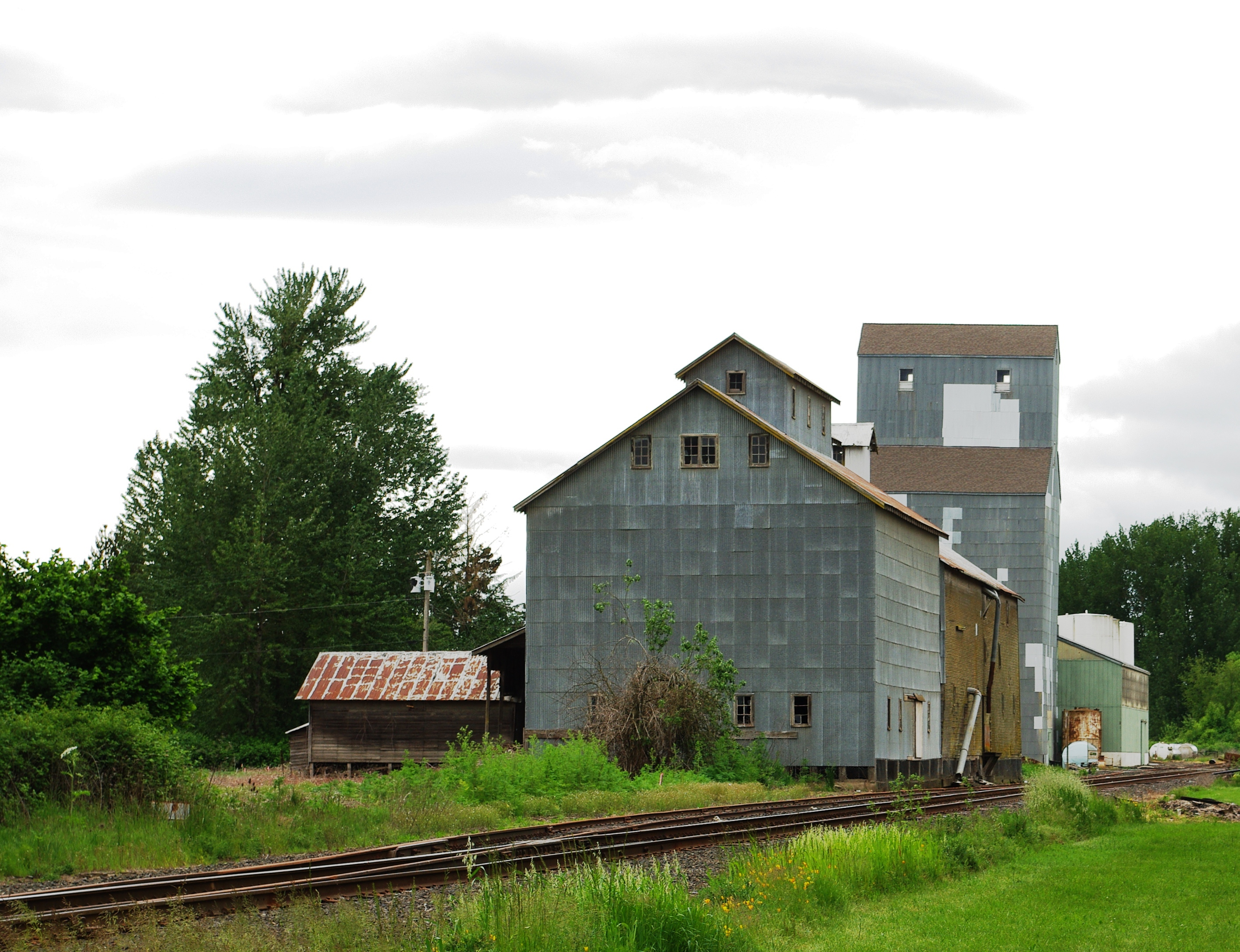
- Grain elevator in Ballston
- Interactive map of Ballston
- Coordinates: 45°04′00″N 123°19′15″W
- Country: United States
- State: Oregon
- County: Polk County
- Founded: 1878
- Founder: Isaac Ball
- Elevation: 184 ft (56 m)
- ZIP code: 97378
- Area codes: 503 and 971
- GNIS feature ID: 1162825

Ballston is an unincorporated community, in Polk County, Oregon, United States. It is southeast of Sheridan and southwest of Amity. It is considered a ghost town.

Ballston was founded in 1878 by pioneer Isaac Ball on his donation land claim. Ball and his family immigrated from England, and arrived in Oregon via the Oregon Trail in 1848. Ball named the town "Ballsville", and it had a post office of the same name. The name of the post office was changed to Ballston in 1880. The post office was discontinued in 1953 when it became a rural station of Sheridan; it was discontinued all together in 1969.

Ballston was a station on the Dayton, Sheridan and Grande Ronde Railroad (DS&GR), later the Oregonian Railway. Isaac Ball was an early promoter of the DS&GR when it was originally a narrow gauge railway line. The line changed ownership again to become part of the Southern Pacific Railroad; as of 2009, Ballston is a station of the Portland and Western Railroad.

In 1915, the community had a population of 104, a public school, two churches, and three fraternal lodges.

The 1855 Ballston School building, no longer in use as a school, is thought to be the oldest school building still standing in Polk County or perhaps the entire state. Ballston County Park is located in the community and includes the school.

The Ballston Community Club meets in a newer former schoolhouse originally moved from Airlie, another community on the railroad line. The Community Club hosted an annual turkey dinner for many years.
