= Cecil Hare =

Canadian gridiron football player (1919–1963)

No. 11, 22
- Position: Running back

Personal information
- Born: March 2, 1919; Glenbush, Saskatchewan, Canada
- Died: April 15, 1963 (aged 44); Coeur d'Alene, Idaho, U.S.
- Listed height: 5 ft 11 in (1.80 m)
- Listed weight: 195 lb (88 kg)

Career information
- High school: Sheridan (Sheridan, Oregon)
- College: Gonzaga

Career history
- Washington Redskins (1941–1942, 1945); New York Giants (1946)

Awards and highlights
- NFL champion (1942); 2× Pro Bowl (1941, 1942)

Cecil James Hare (March 2, 1919 – April 15, 1963) was an American football running back in the National Football League (NFL) for the Washington Redskins and New York Giants. He played college football at Gonzaga University. Hare's brother Ray Hare also played in the NFL. Ray and Cecil were both members of the 1942 NFL champion Redskins.
