= Dayton, Sheridan and Grande Ronde Railroad =

Defunct railroad in Oregon, United States

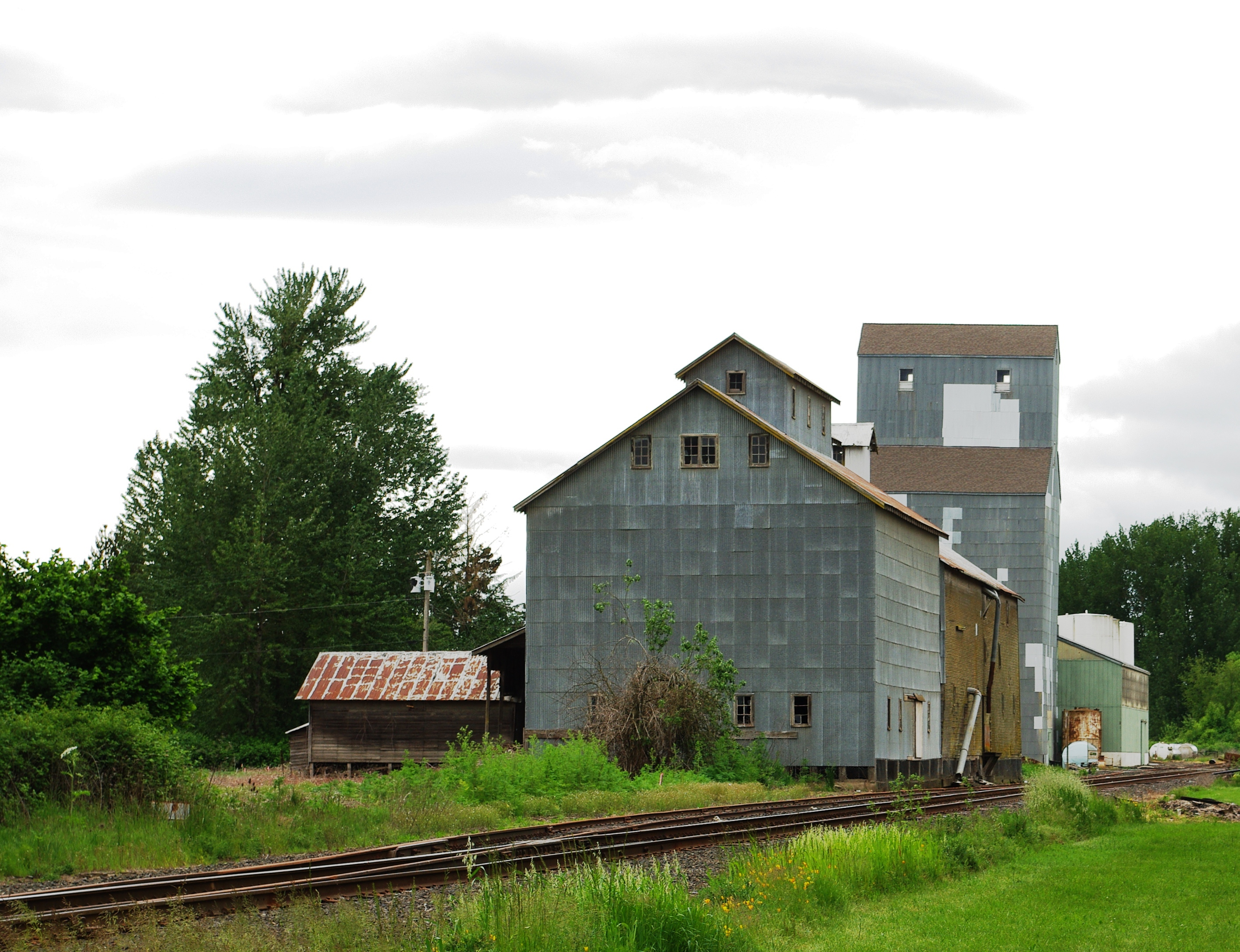
Tracks from the line at Ballston

The Dayton, Sheridan and Grand Ronde Railroad (DS&GR) was a 3 ft (914 mm) narrow gauge railroad in Yamhill and Polk counties in the U.S. state of Oregon.

== History ==
In 1877, farmers in Bellevue, Dallas, Perrydale, Sheridan and Willamina met to discuss building a railroad that would serve their towns. An agreement was reached, and the railroad was incorporated. The railroad constructed twenty miles of tracks on the Yamhill and South Yamhill rivers between Sheridan in the west and Dayton to the east.

By 1879, the railroad was out of money and taken over by a group of Scot capitalists led by the Earl of Airlie. They paid off the debt of the DS&GR and formed the Oregonian Railway.

== See also ==
- List of defunct Oregon railroads
