= Sheridan Japanese School =

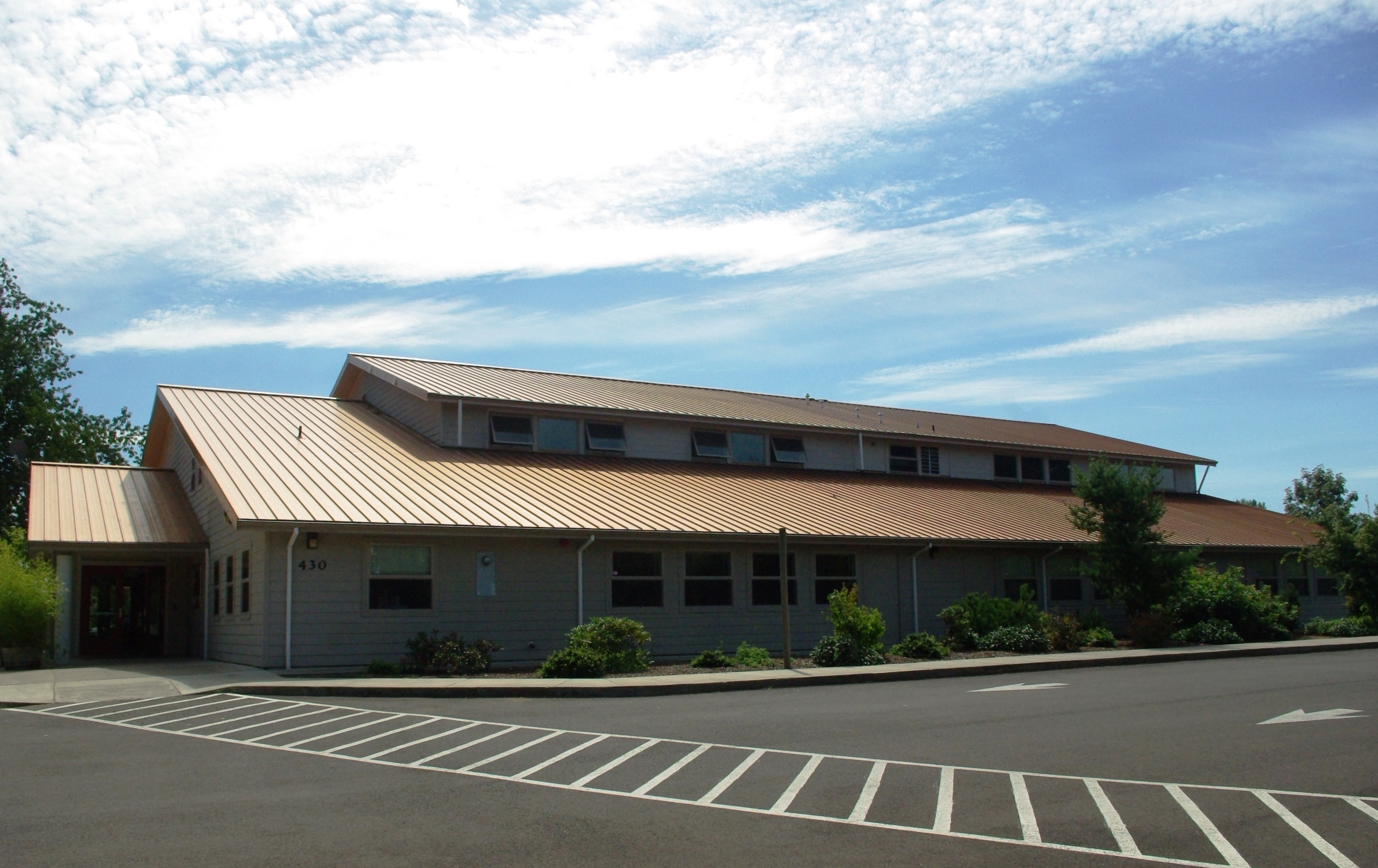

Location
- 430 SW Monroe Street; Sheridan, Yamhill County, Oregon 97378; United States; 45.097558°N 123.399537°W

Information
- Type: Public
- Opened: 1994
- Closed: June 2022
- School district: Sheridan School District
- Grades: 4-12
- Colors: black and red
- Mascot: Koi
- Accreditation: NAAS

Sheridan Japanese School was a public charter school in Sheridan, Oregon, United States. The school has been accredited by the Northwest Association of Accredited Schools since 2000. It was a Japanese-language school. The school closed down permanently in June 2022, due to finance problems and the lack of students signing up for the school next year.

== Academics ==
In 2008, 100% of the school's seniors received their high school diploma; 4 graduated and 0 dropped out.
