= Ray Hare =

American football player (1917–1975)

No. 42, 66
- Position: Running back

Personal information
- Born: November 21, 1917; North Battleford, Saskatchewan, Canada
- Died: June 2, 1975 (aged 57); Chewelah, Washington, U.S.
- Listed height: 6 ft 1 in (1.85 m)
- Listed weight: 204 lb (93 kg)

Career information
- High school: Sheridan (Sheridan, Oregon)
- College: Gonzaga (1936–1939)
- NFL draft: 1940: undrafted

Career history
- Washington Redskins (1940–1943); Brooklyn Tigers (1944); New York Yankees (1946)

Awards and highlights
- NFL champion (1942); Pro Bowl (1942)

Career NFL/AAFC statistics
- Rushing yards: 542
- Rushing average: 4.1
- Receptions: 28
- Receiving yards: 359
- Total touchdowns: 4
- Stats at Pro Football Reference

Raymond Lewis Hare (November 21, 1917 – June 2, 1975) was an American football running back in the National Football League (NFL) for the Washington Redskins and the Brooklyn Tigers. Hare also played in the All-America Football Conference (AAFC) for the New York Yankees. He attended Gonzaga University.

Hare achieved legendary status during the 1943 Washington Redskins season, when he played all ten league games, the Eastern Division championship game, and the 1943 NFL Championship Game while missing a total only 13 minutes of action. The average of barely more than 1 minute of rest per game was provided by teammates Coye Dunn (3 minutes) and Joe Gibson (10 minutes), according to the original report in the Washington Post. Hare's brother, Cecil Hare, also played in the NFL. Ray and Cecil were both members of the 1942 NFL champion Redskins.
