= Sheridan Bridge (Oregon) =

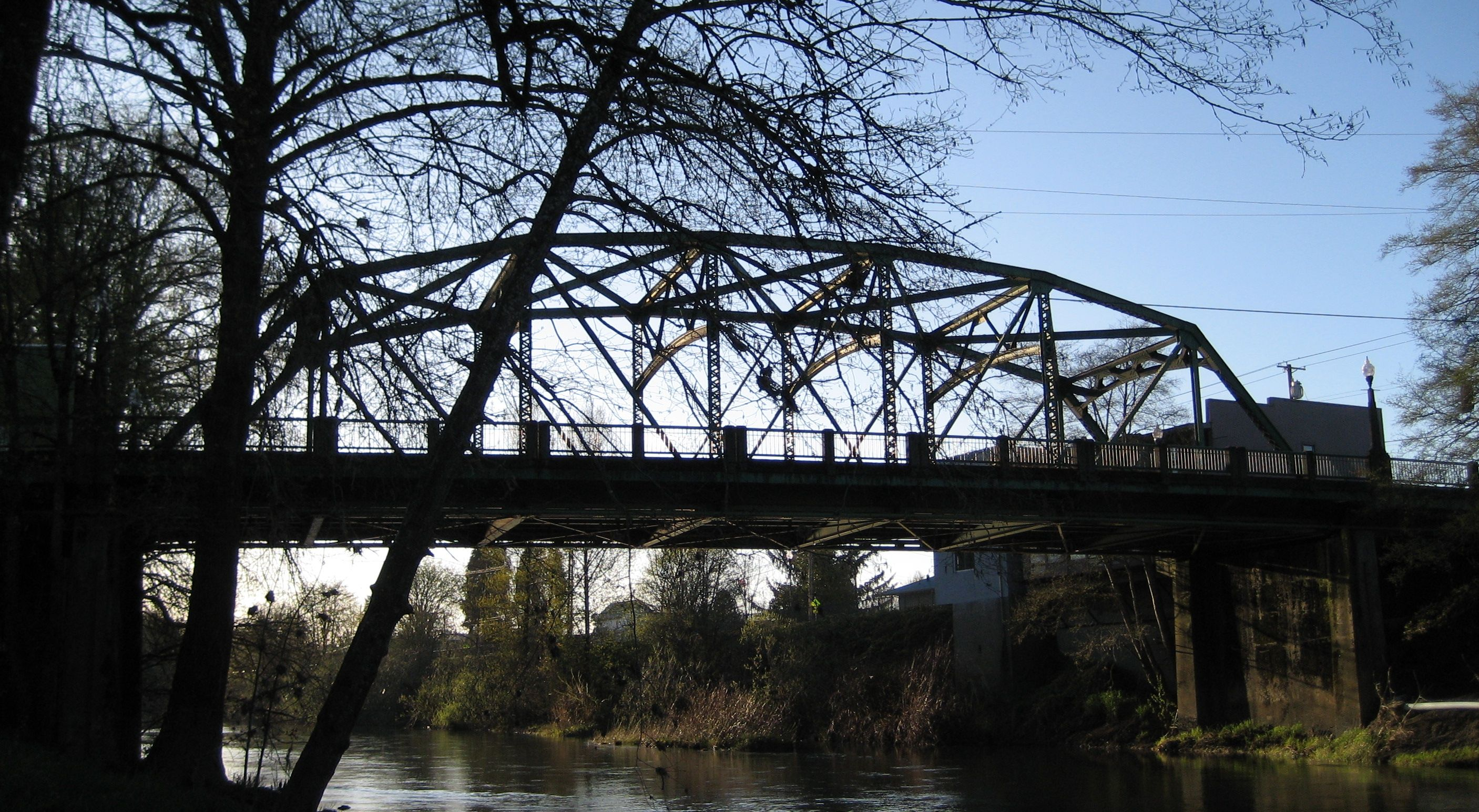
- Coordinates: 45.098912°N 123.395433°W
- Carries: Bridge Street
- Crosses: South Yamhill River
- Locale: Sheridan, Oregon
- Maintained by: Yamhill County
- ID number: 02557 024 00283

Characteristics
- Design: truss
- Total length: 258 feet (78.6 m)
- Width: 26 feet (7.9 m)

History
- Opened: 1939

Location
- Interactive map of Sheridan Bridge

Sheridan Bridge is a two-lane steel Truss bridge carrying vehicular traffic in Sheridan, Oregon, United States. Construction began in 1938 and finished in 1939. This 258-foot (79 m) bridge connects the northern and southern portions of the town across the South Yamhill River in Yamhill County.

== History ==
Sheridan Bridge was built in 1938. It was a project of the Works Progress Administration during the Great Depression of the 1930s. When the new bridge was built, the older steel bridge was lifted up and moved down river a short distance. Mountain States Construction Company built the bridge for Yamhill County. In 2013, Wildish Standard Paving Company began repairs on the bridge that closed one lane during construction. The Oregon Department of Transportation paid for the project that included a seismic retrofit, new paint, and resurfacing of the deck, among other improvements.

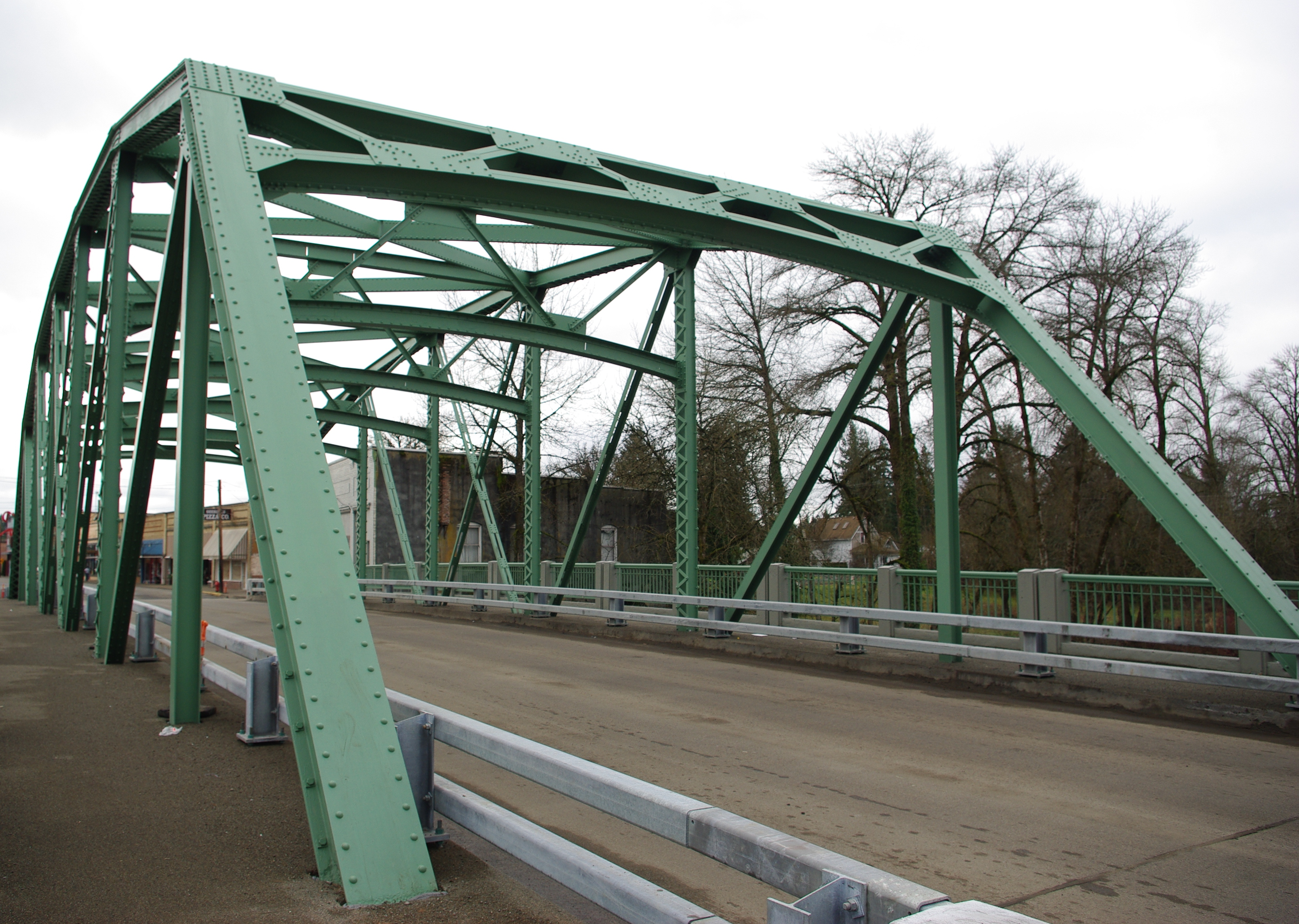
View from the south after repainting in 2013

== Location ==
The steel bridge carries Bridge Street across the South Yamhill River where the bridge's northern terminus is at the intersection with Oregon Route 18 Business (Main Street). Bridge Street then continues south to Oregon Route 18 where it ends just north of the Federal Correctional Institution, Sheridan. It is the only passenger bridge inside of town (there is a railroad bridge further upriver), and is maintained by Yamhill County. As of 2001 the bridge carries an average of 2,163 vehicles per-day on the two-lane structure in downtown Sheridan. In addition to one lane of traffic in each direction, the bridge has sidewalks on both sides.
