= William Reid (Scottish businessman) =

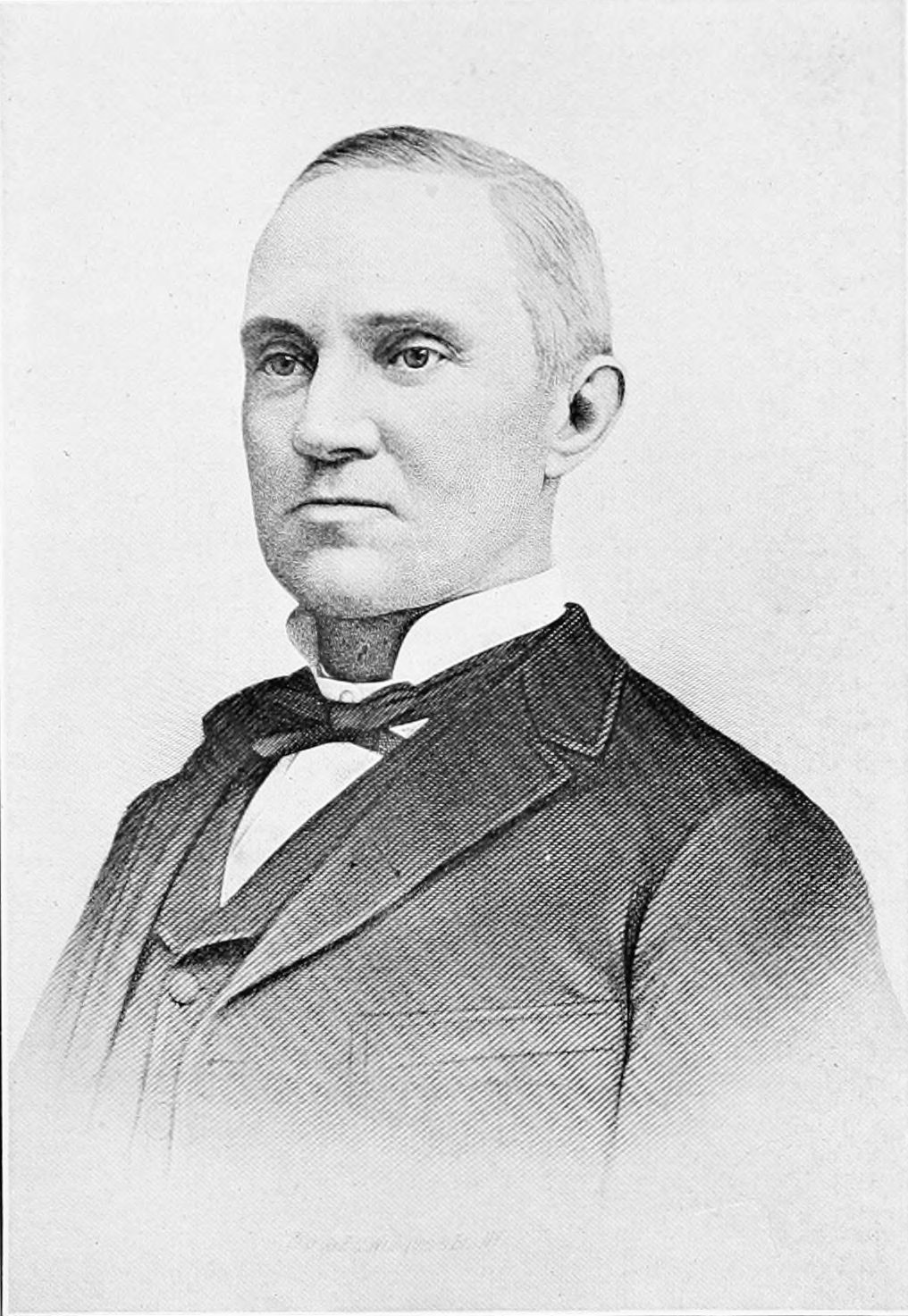

William Reid was a Scottish businessman who emigrated to the U.S. state of Oregon in 1874 to establish the Oregonian Railway. He made several extensions to the railroad in the western Willamette Valley. The city of Dundee, Oregon was named after Dundee, where Reid had previously lived.
