= Sheridan School District (Oregon) =

School district in Oregon, United States

Location
- Yamhill County Greater Sheridan, Oregon United States

District information
- Type: Public
- Grades: K-12
- Superintendent: Dorie Vickery

Students and staff
- Students: 1,042

Other information
- High Schools: 1
- Elementary Schools: 1
- Other Schools: 2
- Website: www.sheridan.k12.or.us

The Sheridan School District 48J is a unified school district that serves the Sheridan area in the U.S. state of Oregon. The district has four schools and 1,042 students. District offices are in Sheridan on Bridge Street at the high school. Dorie Vickery is the district superintendent, with oversight by the five-member school board. The district is part of the Willamette Education Service District.

== History ==
By 1871 a public school had been built in Sheridan. In 1894, the school had an enrollment of about 100 students, with a single principal and two assistants. The single school district's building was worth $10,000 in 1908, and at that time the school employed six teachers, but grew to ten teachers two years later. By 1913 the school held classes through twelfth grade and included a manual labor training department.

Two school board members faced recall in 1985 after local church leaders objected to the unmarried couple living together, with one not yet divorced from his wife prior to moving in with the female board member. The Sheridan district considered merging with the neighboring Willamina School District in 1993. Willamina approved the merger, but voters in Sheridan voted down the proposal 417 to 411.

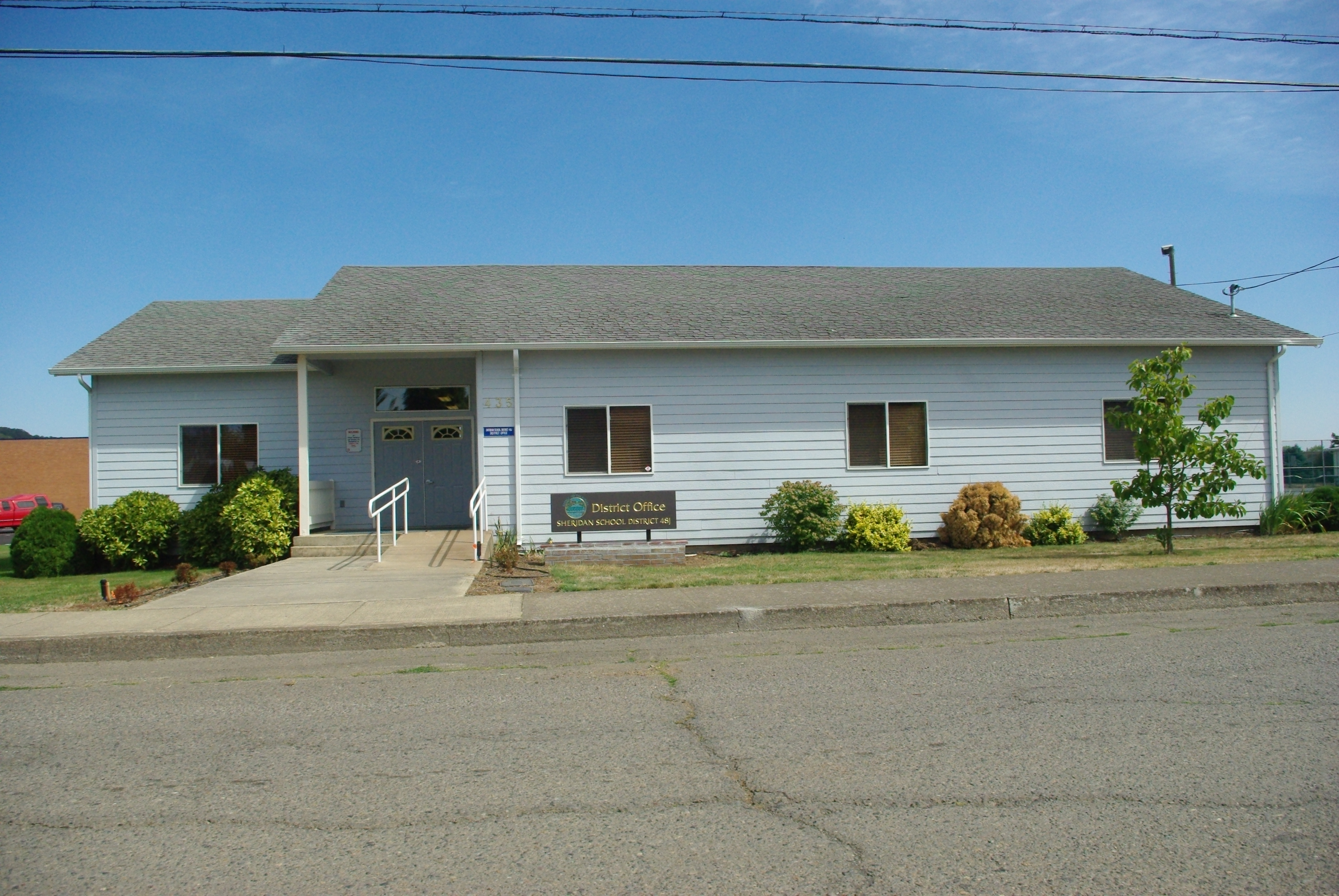
District offices on Bridge Street

The district built a new brick school in 1935. In 1998, this school, the K-3 Faulconer Elementary School, burned down and was temporarily replaced by modular housing. Voters in the school district approved an $8.5 million bond in 2003 to build a replacement school that would also combine the 4-8 grade Chapman Elementary School into a K-8 school. Faulconer-Chapman School opened in September 2004. The old Chapman school building was burned down in a fire training exercise in May 2005. In 2005, the school's average enrollment was 965, an increase from 954 students in the district in October 2001.

== Schools and demographics ==
The district includes four schools, a K-8 school, one high school, a charter school, and an alternative school. As of 2008, the district had 1,042 students and 69 staff members as of 2000. In the 2009 school year, the district had 21 students classified as homeless by the Department of Education, or 2.1% of students in the district.

=== Faulconer-Chapman ===
Located on the southwest side of town near Oregon Route 18, the Faulconer-Chapman School serves 608 students in grades kindergarten through eighth. Officially dedicated on September 28, 2004, the school has 80,000 square feet (7,400 m^{2}) of space with a total of 31 classrooms. The $10 million, two-story building also has laboratory space, a gym, a cafeteria, and a library. It was built on the grounds of the old Chapman school and retained that school's gym. The name is a combination of the two schools it replaced, Chapman and Faulconer schools. Originally, the name was to be Faulconer-Chapman Elementary School, but the term elementary was dropped before the school opened. For the 2007 to 2008 school year the state rated the school as satisfactory for academics. The school's gym is also utilized as an emergency shelter.

=== Sheridan High School ===
Sheridan High School is the main high school, with students in grades nine through twelve. Known as the Spartans, the OSAA Class 3A school has an enrollment of 287. For the 2007 to 2008 school year the state rated the school as satisfactory on academics.

=== Others ===
Opportunity House is an alternative high school with 49 students in grades ten through twelve, while the Sheridan Japanese School (a charter school) has 88 students in grades four through twelve. Opportunity House opened in 1996. For the 2007 to 2008 school year the state rated the Japanese School as exceptional for academics.
