= Sheridan High School (Oregon) =

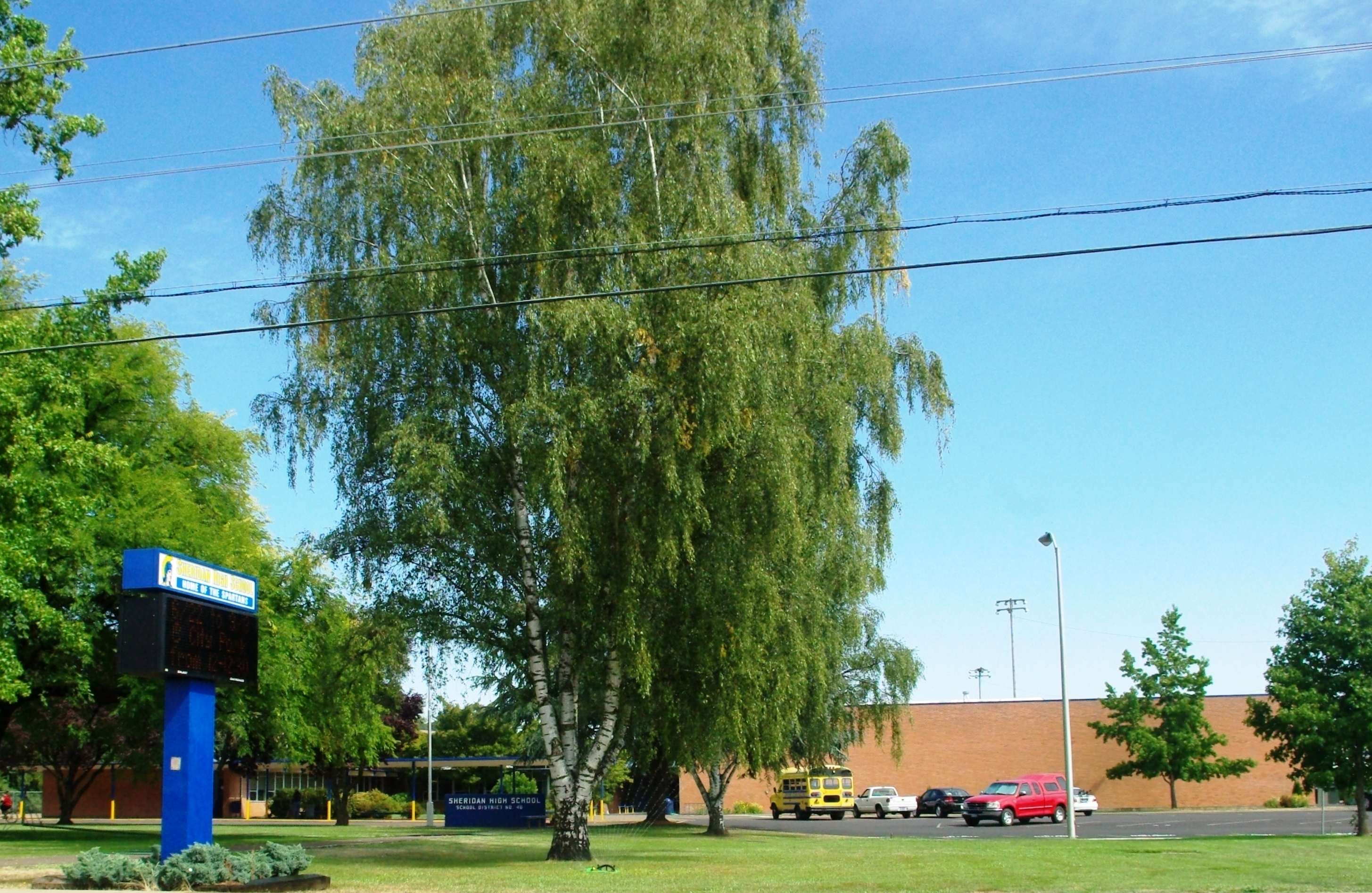

Location
- 433 S. Bridge Street; Sheridan, Yamhill County, Oregon 97378; United States; 45.09525°N 123.3945°W

Information
- Type: Public
- School district: Sheridan School District
- Principal: Patrick Schrader
- Teaching staff: 14.91 (FTE)
- Grades: 9–12
- Enrollment: 238 (2017–18)
- Student to teacher ratio: 15.96
- Campus: Rural
- Colors: Navy blue and gold
- Athletics conference: OSAA West Valley League 3A-2
- Mascot: Spartan
- Website: Sheridan High School

Sheridan High School is a public high school in Sheridan, Oregon, United States.

== History ==
The class of 2008 was the 100th class in the school's history.

== Academics ==
In 2008, 91% of the school's seniors received their high school diploma. Of 66 students, 60 graduated, 1 dropped out, 3 received a modified diploma, and 2 were still in high school in 2009.

== Notable alumni ==
- Ray Hare, American football player
- Joni Huntley, bronze medalist in the high jump at the 1984 Summer Olympics
- Barbara Roberts, former governor of Oregon
