= Airlie Red Flesh =

Apple cultivar

Malus pumila 'Airlie Red Flesh', 'Hidden Rose', or 'Mountain Rose'
- Species: Malus pumila
- Hybrid parentage: Seems unknown
- Cultivar: 'Airlie Red Flesh'
- Origin: (United States) , Airlie, Oregon

Oregon apple with bright pink flesh and speckled green skin.

The Airlie Red Flesh, (also known as the Hidden Rose or the Mountain Rose), is a cultivar of domesticated apple.

== Overview ==
The Airlie Red Flesh tree will grow to a height of 4 meters (13 ft) to 5 meters (16 ft), and starts to fruit after about 4 years of growing. Airlie Red Flesh fruits are medium-sized, often small. The flavour of an Airlie Red Flesh apple has a balance of sweetness and tartness. The Airlie Red Flesh apple has dark red flesh and a crisp texture. The Airlie Red Flesh apple tends to ripen in late September.
