= Gopher Valley =

Unincorporated community in the state of Oregon, United States

Coordinates: 45°08′51″N 123°23′24″W

Gopher Valley is a valley in Yamhill County, Oregon, United States. Gopher, Oregon was an unincorporated locale in the valley. Gopher post office ran from April 6, 1899 to September 14, 1905, with Edward H. Taylor first postmaster.

== Geography ==
Gopher Valley is located on hills on the north side of Oregon Route 18 about two miles (3 km) east of Sheridan. Gopher Valley rises in elevation from 200 feet (61 m) at the south end to over 2,000 feet (610 m) at the peaks of the hills, encompassing fertile farmland and timber. The Gopher Valley is about 20 square miles (52 km^{2}) in area. Deer Creek meanders through the valley on its way to the South Yamhill River.

== History ==
The first settlers did not take up claims in the valley until 1850, some seven years after the arrival of the first settlers in the nearby Yamhill Valley. Most of these early "Gopherites" claimed 640 acres (2.6 km^{2}), while later settlers could only claim half that amount, due to changes in the Donation Land Claim Act after 1850. Among the earliest settlers were Stephen Hussey, Joseph Pearson, William Toney, Peter Carlisle, Edward Warren, Green P. R. Atterbury, Edward Warren, James Morgan and Owen Turner. Some of these pioneers were unmarried, which was another reason they could only claim 320 acres (1.3 km^{2}).

An 1851 map of the Willamette Valley notes "Gopher Hole" at this location. There was an early attempt by Mrs. Charles Shortridge to change the name to Lebanon Valley, but the settlers had grown accustomed to Gopher. Furthermore, the town of Lebanon in Linn County was already established. There has been some speculation that the name was based on the shape of the valley as seen from the air, but this hardly seems possible given the lack of topographic maps or aircraft to determine the actual shape (which does not resemble the shape of any animal).

The earliest school was about halfway up the valley, and while it was referred to as the Lebanon Valley School District 36 in the early 1880s, the Yamhill Reporter (published in McMinnville) called this the Gopher Valley school in an 1886 article. School District 42, known as Fremont and later as the McKinley school, was established at about the same time. This school was near the intersection of Grauer Road and Gopher Valley Road. A third valley school, originally known as Ryan’s Mill (District 82) was established in 1894 about 10 miles (16 km) up the valley. By 1933 this was called the Osman School, but after that it was known as the Deer Creek School. At least two of these schools burned to the ground and the Deer Creek school was rebuilt, but by 1949 all three districts had been consolidated into District 48 in Sheridan.

Edward H. Taylor was the only postmaster serving the community of Gopher, after having been appointed in 1895. In that year, area citizens could pick up their mail at his house, about six miles (10 km) from Sheridan, on the east side of Gopher Valley Road. He later moved to the Hussey home, relocating the office to a small room near the front entry. A window and letter slots were cut into the wall. Different sources report receiving mail via stage three to seven times each week. Perhaps the delivery days had increased by the time the office was officially discontinued in 1905.

The timber industry boomed in the later days of the 19th century into the 1900s, and a number of lumber mills were established in Gopher Valley over the decades. One of the first was Ryan’s Mill, followed by Stowe’s Mill, and later by Thomson’s Mill, for which a road leading to the west, and connecting to the upper end of Rock Creek Road, is named. Most of these mills were in the north end of the valley, with one exception: at one time, a flume carried logs down the valley to a sawmill.

One of the old timers who left a lasting impression with everyone he met was Red Snyder. Red went to work at Stow’s Mill shortly after moving onto his place in the upper end of the valley in 1908 or 1910. He lived the rest of his life in the valley, except for a stint in the Army during World War I. Red was a colorful character, to say the least, and his memories of people and events up the valley were repeated often to any listener with time on their hands. Red recalled deer and elk rampaging through the valley in the mid-1930s, as they tried to escape the Tillamook Burn.

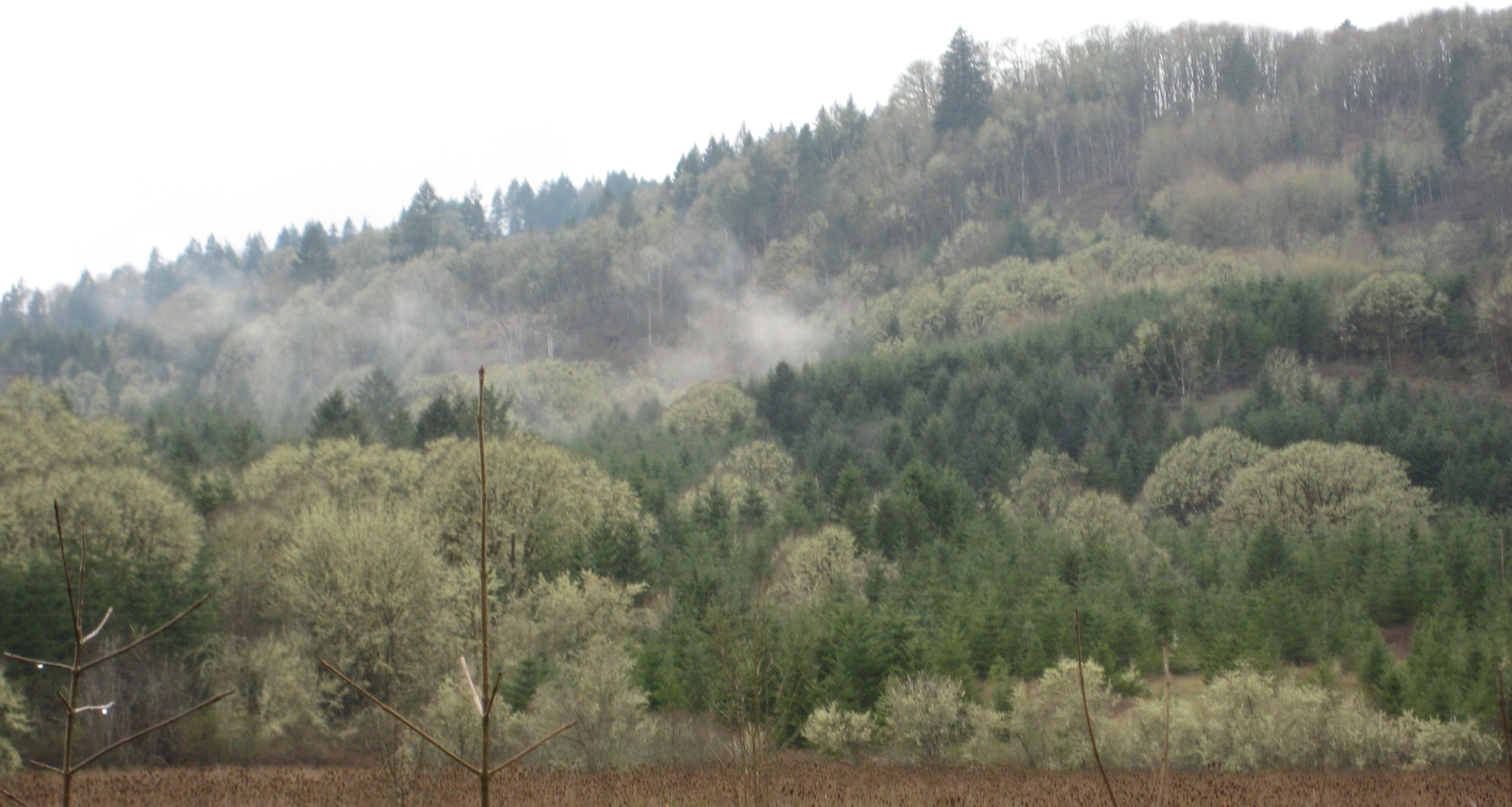
Mist rising above Gopher Valley.

There are at least two pioneer cemeteries up the valley, one on the Agee claim and the other on the Hussey claim. The Agee Cemetery is the larger of the two, taking up about an acre of land about a half-mile beyond the end of the pavement and west of Gopher Valley Road, near Deer Creek. Isaac Agee and his wife Cordilla (Thornton) Agee are buried there. The Hussey Cemetery is on the opposite side of the county road near the end of the pavement. Nathan Hussey and two of his daughters, Sarah Jane and Cornelia, are buried there.

Almost all of the earliest pioneering men were farmers, which meant they also served as blacksmiths in order to make and maintain farm equipment. The first cabins were crude at best, and all furniture was handmade. Most clothing was made in their homes on spinning wheels, and lucky indeed were those ladies who could afford looms! Much of the clothing worn by the men was made from animal hides. Raising a family and getting food on the table were the first priorities.

Electricity was brought into the upper end of the valley in the early 1940s. As recently as the 1960s, annual community potlucks were held at least one Sunday afternoon in the summer.
