= Cove Orchard, Oregon =

Unincorporated community in Oregon, United States

Cove Orchard
- Unincorporated community
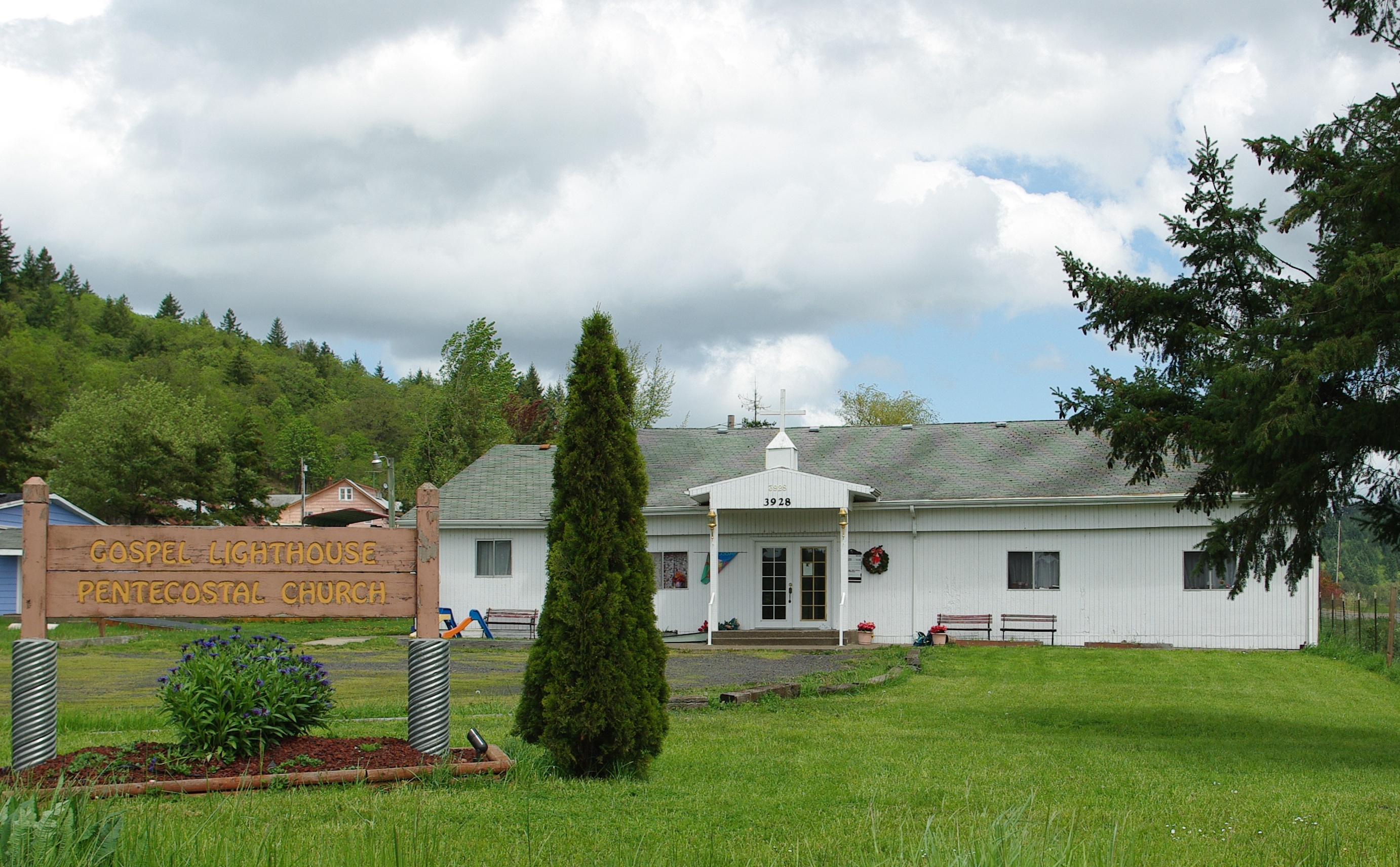
- Pentecostal Church in Cove Orchard

- Location within the state of Oregon Cove Orchard (the United States)
- Coordinates: 45°22′30″N 123°09′17″W
- Country: United States
- State: Oregon
- County: Yamhill
- Elevation: 259 ft (79 m)
- Time zone: UTC-8 (Pacific (PST))
  - Summer (DST): UTC-7 (PDT)
- GNIS feature ID: 1162920

Cove Orchard is an unincorporated community in Yamhill County, in the U.S. state of Oregon. It is along Oregon Route 47 between Yamhill and Gaston in the northern part of the county.

According to Oregon Geographic Names, F. C. Graham of Portland platted the community and chose the name. Cove Orchard had a post office from 1912 to 1953.
