= Travelers Home =

Historic house in Oregon, United States

- U.S. National Register of Historic Places
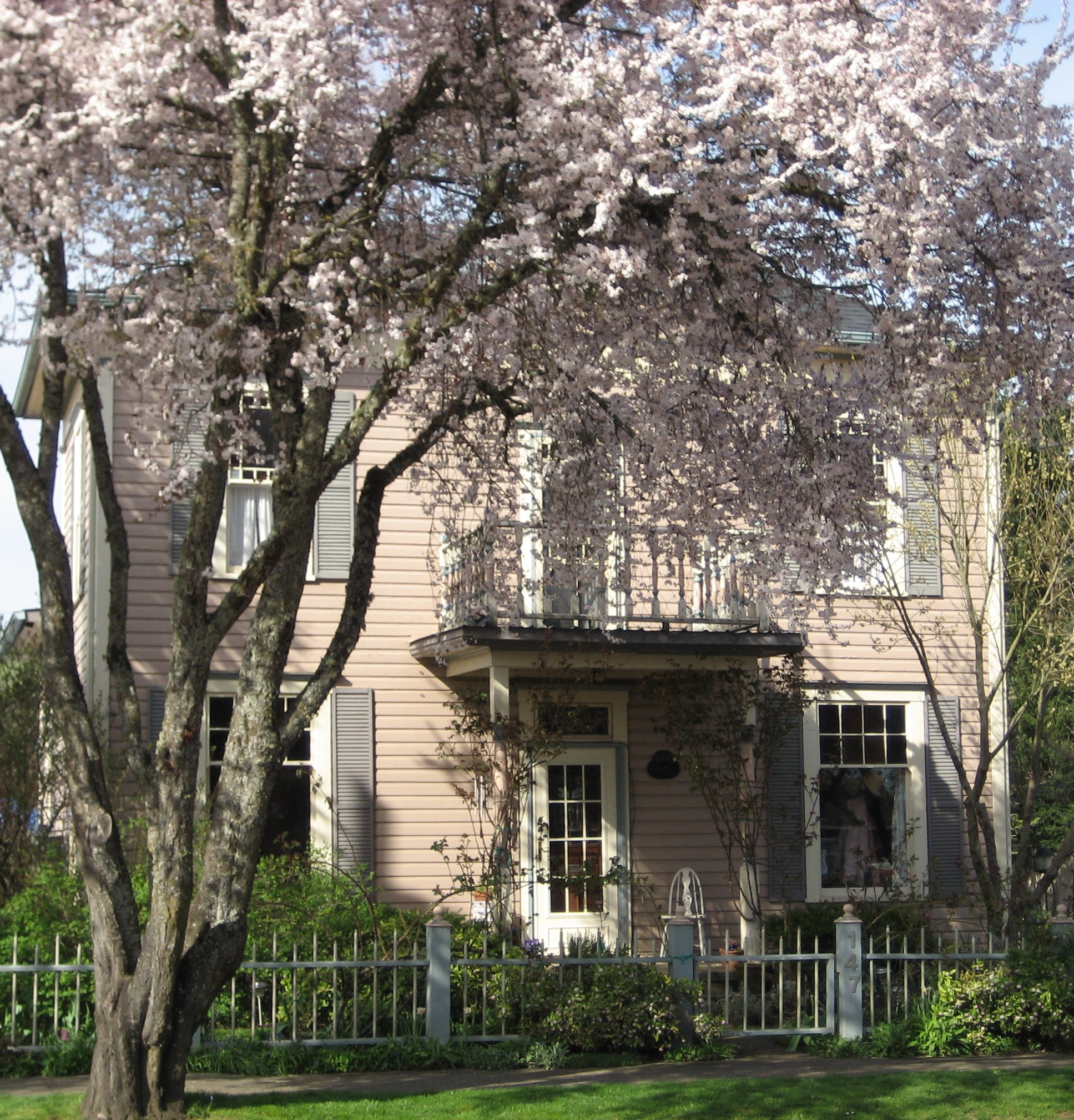

- Location within Oregon
- Interactive map showing the location of Travelers Home
- Location: 147 NE Yamhill Street; Sheridan, Oregon
- Coordinates: 45°06′02″N 123°23′39″W
- Built: 1892
- NRHP reference No.: 82003757
- Added to NRHP: July 8, 1982

Travelers Home is an Italian Villa and Queen Anne style home in Sheridan, Oregon, United States. It was built in 1892, and the building was added to the National Register of Historic Places on July 8, 1982. The building, also known as Savage-Mendenhall-Seth House, has been used as both a hotel and residence. The two-story building has a horizontal board style of siding.
