= Shipley, Oregon =

Unincorporated community in the state of Oregon, United States

- Unincorporated community
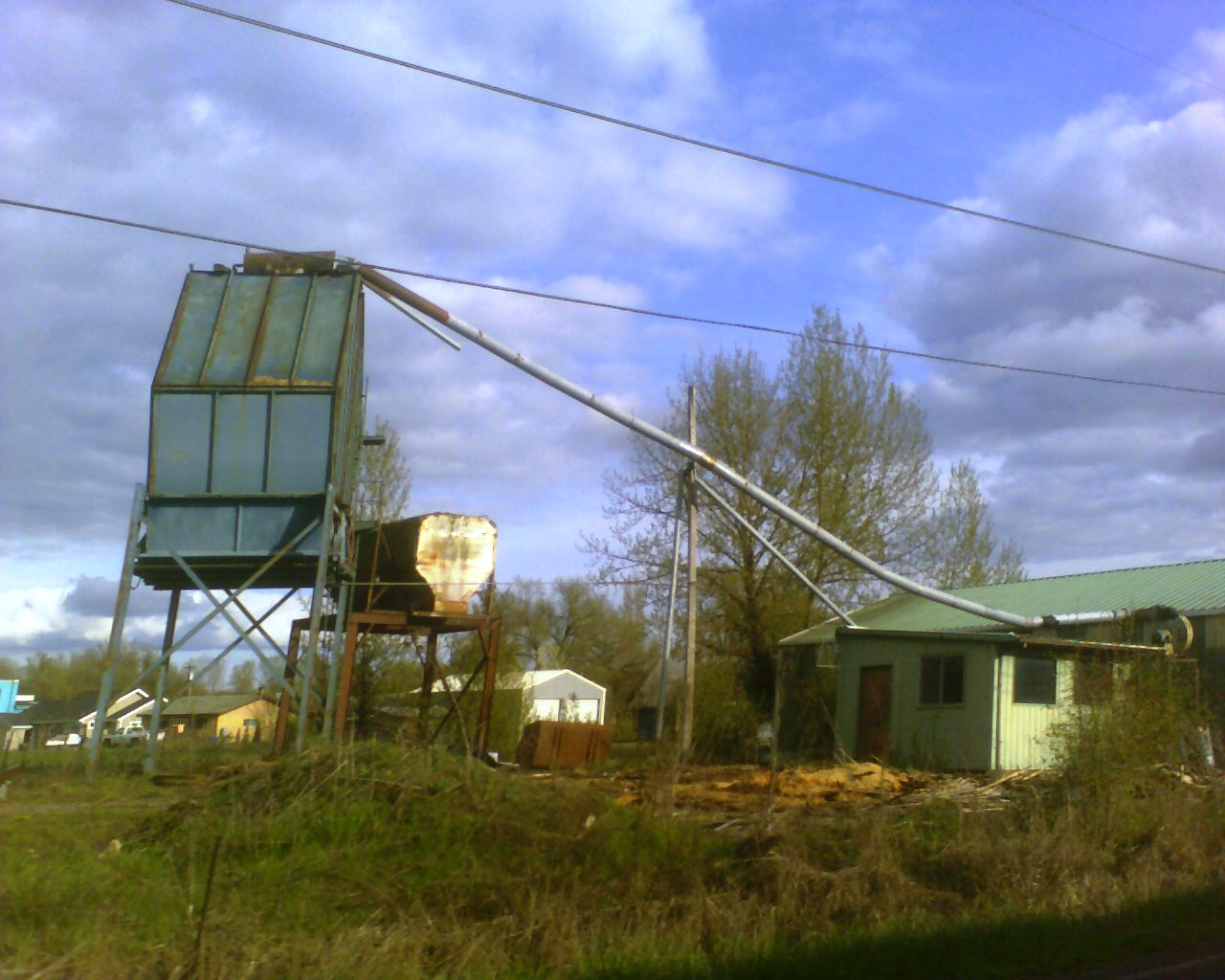
- Sawmill in Shipley

- Location within the state of Oregon Shipley, Oregon (the United States)
- Coordinates: 45°5′45″N 123°25′58″W
- Country: United States
- State: Oregon
- County: Yamhill
- Time zone: UTC-8 (Pacific (PST))
  - Summer (DST): UTC-7 (PDT)
- GNIS feature ID: 1163268

Shipley, Oregon is an unincorporated community in Yamhill County, Oregon, United States. Most of the area has been annexed by the city of Sheridan.

== Location ==
Shipley is located at the intersection of Oregon Route 18 Business and Rock Creek Road on the western end of Sheridan. Rock Creek Road travels to the Delphi Schools. Willamina is located to the west. It sits at 213 feet (65 m) above sea level in the Yamhill Valley along the South Yamhill River. The ZIP Code for Shipley is 97378.
