= Sheridan, Oregon =

- City
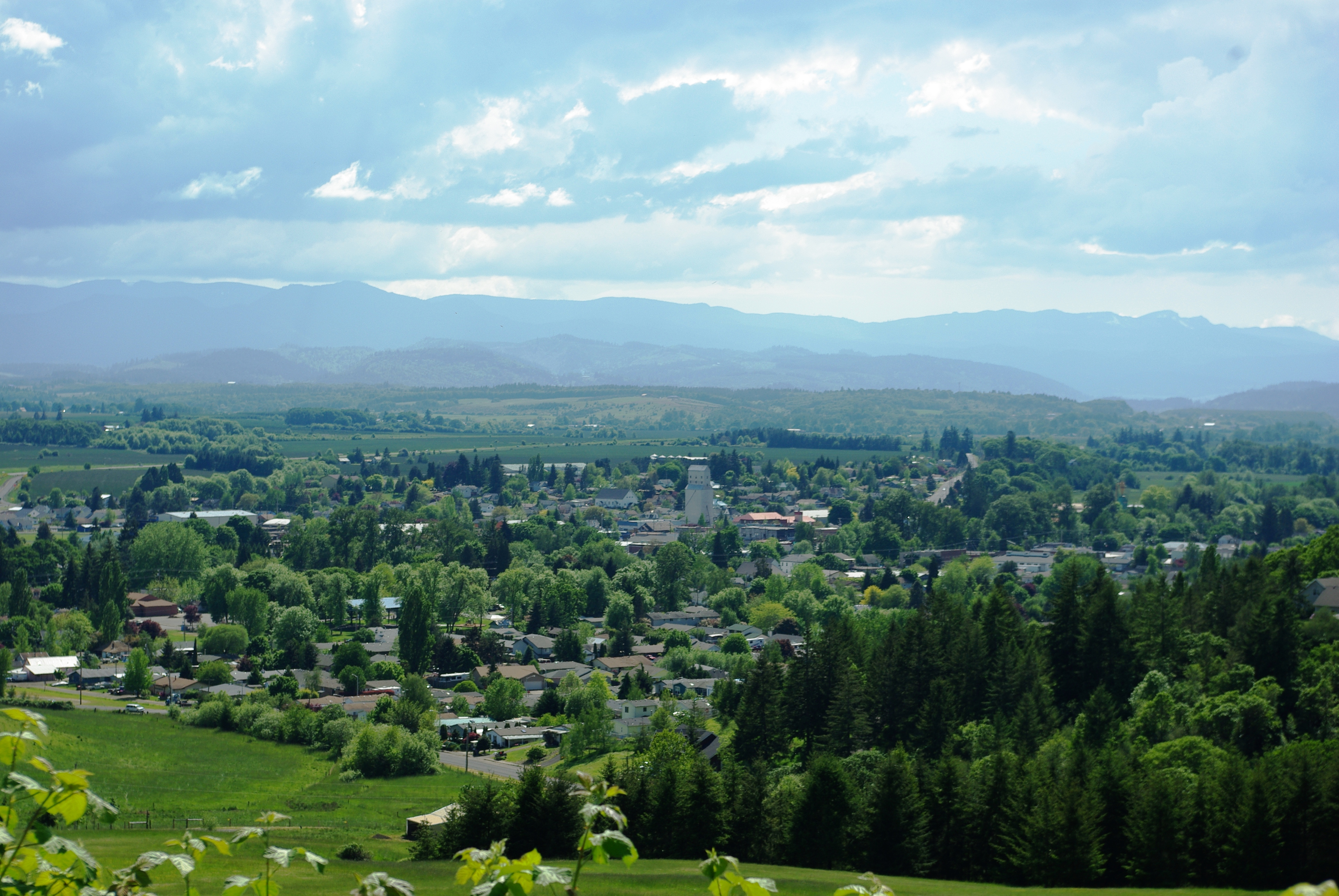
- View of Sheridan, looking southwest

- Location in Oregon
- Coordinates: 45°05′46″N 123°23′54″W
- Country: United States
- State: Oregon
- County: Yamhill
- Incorporated: 1880
- Named for: Philip Sheridan

Government
  - Mayor: Cale George

Area
  - Total: 2.15 sq mi (5.57 km^{2})
  - Land: 2.10 sq mi (5.44 km^{2})
  - Water: 0.050 sq mi (0.13 km^{2})
- Elevation: 197 ft (60 m)

Population (2020)
  - Total: 4,639
  - Density: 2,208.5/sq mi (852.69/km^{2})
- Time zone: UTC-8 (Pacific)
  - Summer (DST): UTC-7 (Pacific)
- ZIP code: 97378
- Area codes: 503 and 971
- FIPS code: 41-67050
- GNIS feature ID: 2411886
- Website: www.cityofsheridanor.com

Sheridan is a city in Yamhill County, Oregon, United States. Platted in the 1860s when it received a post office, Sheridan was incorporated in 1880. In 1913, much of the town burned in a fire and a flood covered much of the community in 1964. The population of Sheridan as of the 2020 census was 4,639.

Located in the western part of the Willamette Valley, Sheridan is at the base of the Northern Oregon Coast Range along the South Yamhill River. Sheridan lies around 13 miles southwest of the county seat of McMinnville, along Oregon Route 18. This highway and Oregon Route 18 Business run east–west through Sheridan and nearby Willamina, parallel to the river. Sheridan Bridge is the only river crossing within Sheridan.

Sheridan's largest employer is Federal Correctional Institution, Sheridan, a federal minimum and medium security prison. Sheridan has a Mayor–council form of government, with daily operations run by a city manager. The community has its own school district, with a single traditional high school. The main events each year in town are Sheridan Days and the Mud Drags, both held in June. Sheridan was named in honor of the American Civil War general Philip Henry Sheridan.

== History ==
Absolem B. Faulconer laid out the plat for what became the city of Sheridan in the mid-1860s. This plat was recorded with the county on December 13, 1866. He had settled in the area in 1847. The Sheridan post office was established on April 4, 1866, with Absolem's brother Thomas serving as postmaster. By 1871, the town had grown to include two blacksmith shops, one church, one school, one hotel, one wagon shop, and two general stores. In October 1878, the Dayton, Sheridan and Grand Ronde Railroad, a narrow-gauge railway, reached the community.

Sheridan, a timber and farming community southwest of Portland and northwest of Salem, was incorporated in 1880. Sheridan was named for General Philip Sheridan, who was posted to Yamhill County and Fort Yamhill in the latter half of the 1850s to monitor the Native Americans at what is now the Grand Ronde Reservation west of the city. By 1894, Sheridan had grown to 400 residents, one bank, two hotels, three churches, and a flouring mill. At that time there was a daily train to the city as well as daily stage coach service from McMinnville, and a single wooden bridge over the river.

Agriculture was the main industry in Sheridan's early years. Around 1910, the main crops included hops, clover-seed, hay, potatoes, onions, and a variety of fruits including apples, prunes, and pears. In March 1910, 150 workers at a lumber yard owned by the Sheridan Lumber Company went on strike for higher wages. The strike was supported by Portland members of the Industrial Workers of the World who picketed employment agencies in Portland to prevent the company from hiring strikebreakers. The action was successful and the workers won a pay increase of twenty-five cents per day, equivalent to $8.64 in 2025. On July 18, 1913, a fire that destroyed most of the commercial district caused $300,000 in damage. Most of the buildings were rebuilt with brick within six months. On October 30, 1930, the Jesuits purchased an 891-acre (361 ha) farm on a hill overlooking the city. There they started St. Francis Xavier's Novitiate, a school for training priests for the order. Opening in a new building and several existing farm buildings in 1931, St. Francis Xavier's added more buildings over the next several decades.

In 1932, the state built a highway through Sheridan from McMinnville to the Oregon Coast, which became Oregon Route 18 or the Salmon River Highway. With funds received through the Works Progress Administration, the current steel bridge across the South Yamhill River was built and opened in 1939. By 1940, agriculture was still a major industry, and the timber industry was growing in importance to the local economy. At that time the city had grown to a population of 1,008 people.

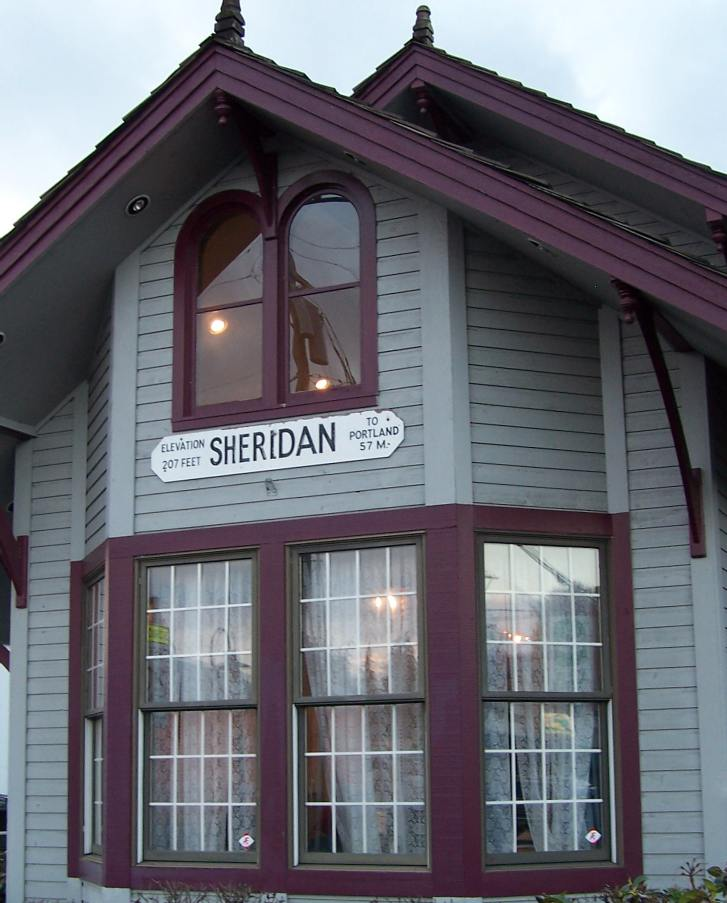
Sheridan's City Hall, a former savings and loan, built to resemble the old train depot

The state built a bypass around Sheridan and Willamina that opened in 1957 to carry Oregon Route 18 on the south end of the city. The old alignment through the center of town became Oregon Route 18 Business. Sheridan had its largest flooding in history on December 22, 1964. The South Yamhill overflowed its banks and isolated the town for two days. The Jesuits sold their training school in 1974 to the Delphian Foundation, who then opened The Delphian School at the site in 1976.

In 1989, a federal minimum and medium security prison called the Federal Correctional Institution opened on the south side of Sheridan. At that time, Sheridan had a population of around 2,500 people. Sheridan moved its city hall into the old railroad station in January 1993, and expanded the renovated building in 1995. The U.S. Census Bureau erroneously listed Sheridan's population as 3,570 in the 2000 Census after mis-listing the prison's population in the wrong census tract. This error of about 2000 people was enough to throw off the state legislative districts beyond their margin of acceptance and the Oregon Supreme Court ruled the Secretary of State must re-draw the boundary lines to match the correct data. Sheridan also counts the prison population as part of the city's official population. In December 2008, a two-alarm fire gutted the 1875 United Methodist Church in the city.

== Geography ==
According to the United States Census Bureau, the city has a total area of 2.01 square miles (5.21 km^{2}), of which, 1.96 square miles (5.08 km^{2}) is land and 0.05 square miles (0.13 km^{2}) is water.

The South Yamhill River divides the city between north and south, and is prone to flooding the city. Deer Creek is the only other stream in the city. Sheridan is located in the western part of the Willamette Valley at an elevation of 189 feet (58 m) above sea level. The city lies at the foothills of the Northern Oregon Coast Range.

Surrounding cities include Willamina about 10 miles (16 km) to the west along Oregon 18B, Amity about 9 miles (14 km) due east, and McMinnville about 13 miles (21 km) to the northeast. Other communities include Ballston to the southeast, Shipley due west, the Gopher Valley to the north and east, and Bellevue to the northeast along Oregon 18. Sheridan is about one-and-a-half miles north of the Polk County line, with the county seat of Dallas approximately 17 miles (27 km) south of Sheridan.

=== Climate ===
Sheridan, as part of the Willamette Valley, is within the Marine west coast climate zone. Summers in there are generally warm, but temperatures year-round are moderated by a marine influence from the Pacific Ocean. The city receives most of its precipitation during the mild to cool winter months, with the wettest period from November through March. Sheridan's average annual precipitation totals 47.16 inches (1,198 mm), with the wettest month coming in December. August is the warmest month with an average high temperature of 83 °F (28 °C), while December is the coolest month with an average high of 45 °F (7 °C). December is also on average the wettest month with 8.78 inches (223 mm). July is the driest month of the year, on average. The highest recorded temperature in Sheridan, 106 °F (41 °C), has occurred twice, on July 19, 1956, and August 8, 1981. Sheridan's lowest ever recorded temperature was −11 °F (−24 °C) on January 31, 1950.

Climate data for Sheridan, Oregon
Month	Jan	Feb	Mar	Apr	May	Jun	Jul	Aug	Sep	Oct	Nov	Dec	Year
Record high °F (°C)	65 (18)	71 (22)	90 (32)	88 (31)	98 (37)	102 (39)	106 (41)	106 (41)	104 (40)	91 (33)	76 (24)	66 (19)	106 (41)
Mean daily maximum °F (°C)	45 (7)	50 (10)	55 (13)	60 (16)	67 (19)	73 (23)	81 (27)	81 (27)	77 (25)	65 (18)	51 (11)	44 (7)	62 (17)
Mean daily minimum °F (°C)	33 (1)	35 (2)	37 (3)	39 (4)	44 (7)	48 (9)	50 (10)	50 (10)	47 (8)	41 (5)	37 (3)	33 (1)	41 (5)
Record low °F (°C)	−11 (−24)	−2 (−19)	10 (−12)	0 (−18)	10 (−12)	10 (−12)	35 (2)	34 (1)	30 (−1)	22 (−6)	9 (−13)	−2 (−19)	−11 (−24)
Average precipitation inches (mm)	7.65 (194)	5.86 (149)	4.87 (124)	3.17 (81)	2.14 (54)	1.52 (39)	0.42 (11)	0.54 (14)	1.16 (29)	3.08 (78)	7.70 (196)	9.05 (230)	47.16 (1,198)
Source: The Weather Channel

== Transportation ==
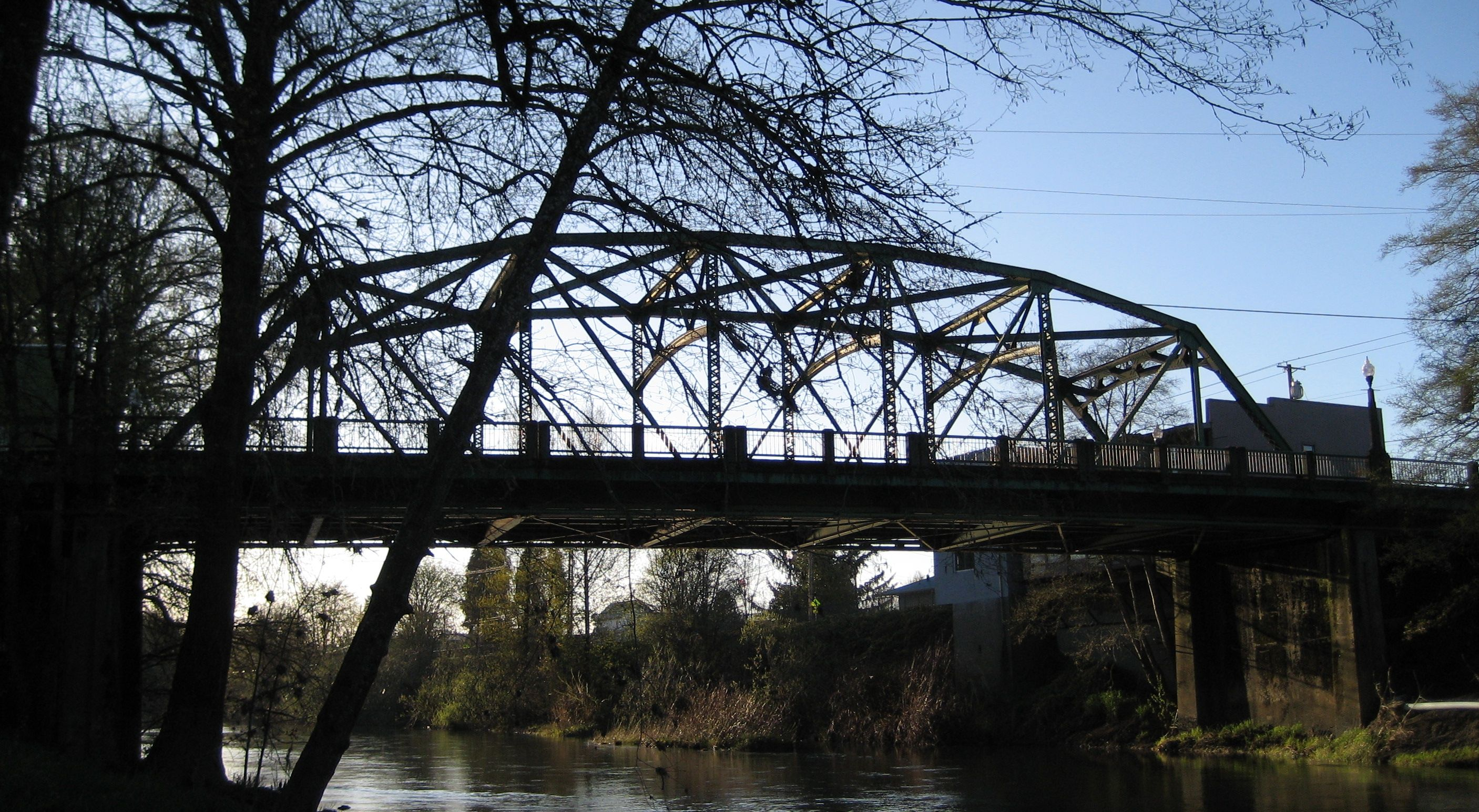
Sheridan Bridge over the South Yamhill River

The city is served by two main roads, Oregon Route 18 and Oregon Route 18 Business. The business route, also known as Main Street, runs through downtown on the north side of the South Yamhill River and connects to Shipley and Willamina, to the west. The Sheridan Bridge on Bridge Street connects the two sides of the city across the river. The railroad has the only other bridge crossing the river in the city. Oregon Route 18 connects to McMinnville, the county seat, and beyond to the Portland metropolitan area to the east. Other major roads include Sheridan Street, Mill Street, Sherman Street, Cherry Hill Road, and Rock Creek Road.

Willamette & Pacific Railroad provides freight rail service to the city, but there is no passenger rail in the city. Sheridan does not have any public use airports, with McMinnville Municipal Airport as the closest public airport. One local private airport is Abba's Airport, but half the airstrip is now part of a solar farm while the other half appears inactive and overgrown. There is public transportation via Yamhill Community Action Partnership with a bus to McMinnville.

== Economy ==
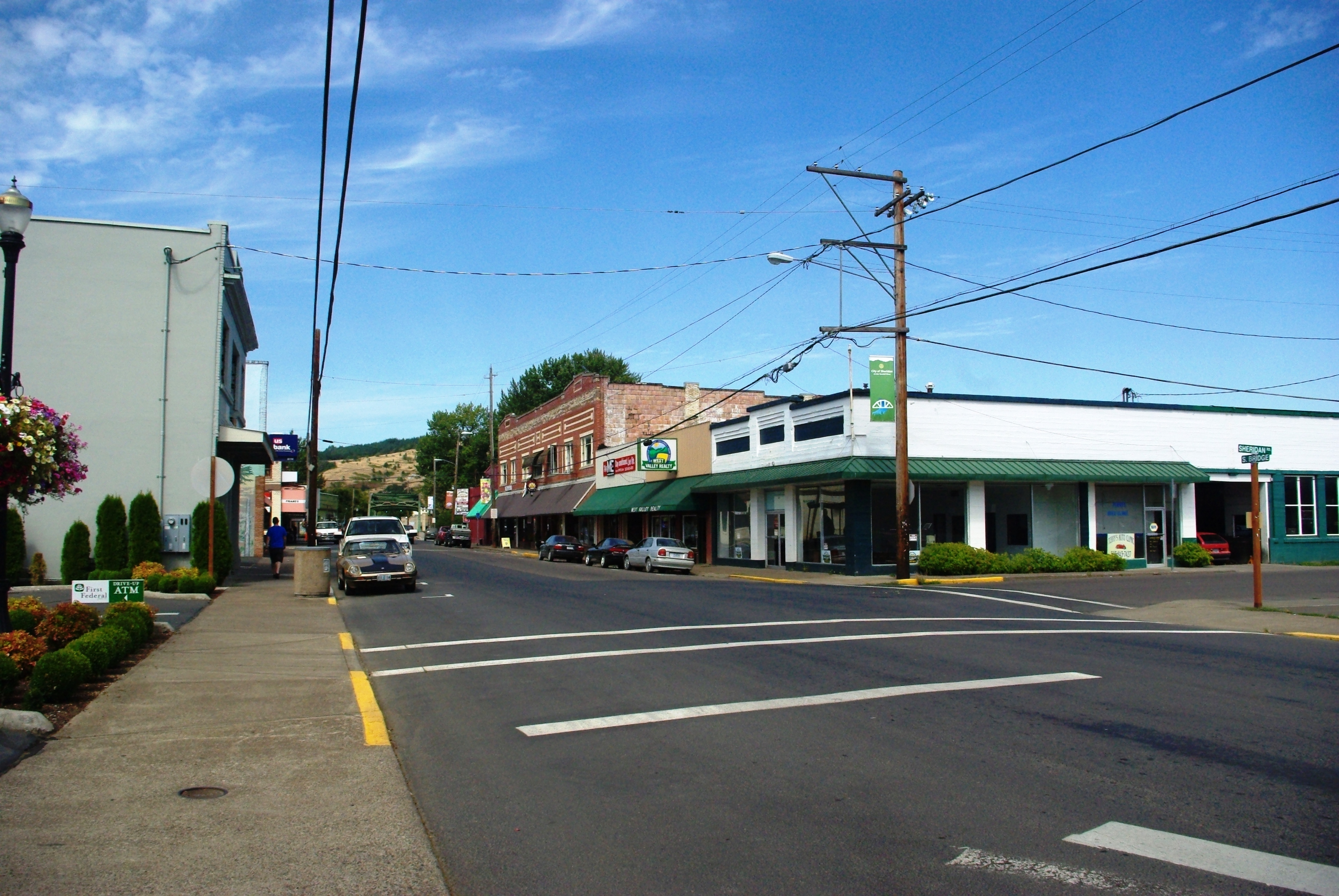
The commercial district on Bridge Street

The economy of Sheridan includes agriculture, timber, manufacturing, and service sector employment. As of 2000, the Spirit Mountain Casino outside of the city employed the most people in the area with 1,000 employees. The federal prison was the largest employer in the city with 500 employees, followed by Liberty Homes with 100 employees at the manufactured homes builder. The closest hospital is the Willamette Valley Medical Center in McMinnville.

The commercial district is centered on Bridge and Main streets, with their intersection as the location of the only traffic signal in the city. There were 12 manufacturing companies in Sheridan, one commercial bank, and one savings and loan as of 2006. Sheridan also has one gas station, two grocery stores, one pharmacy, five restaurants, and two hardware stores among other businesses.

The Delphian School in unincorporated Yamhill County, near Sheridan, houses the offices of Delphi Schools and Heron Books.

== Government ==
City police protection is provided under contract by the Yamhill County Sheriff's Office. The office maintains a substation at Sheridan's city hall. Sheridan Fire District provides fire protection to the city and more than 100 square miles (260 km^{2}) of the surrounding area including neighboring Ballston. The district operates three fire stations, one in the city, and had 35 firefighters as of 1998.

Sheridan is a home rule charter city, with a mayor-council government. Cale George is the mayor, who heads the city council that includes six others, with the mayor voting to break ties. Council members and the mayor are elected to four-year terms. A city manager runs the daily operations of the city's government. City hall is located in the building that once served as the city's train depot.

Sheridan operates its own water and wastewater treatment systems, both built in 1949. Drinking water comes from the South Yamhill River and from springs on Stony Mountain to the north. Sheridan has two city parks, Sheridan City Park that includes a skatepark, and South Park along Oregon Route 18 that features a fishing pond. Additionally, there is the J. A. Art Hebert Memorial Plaza on Bridge Street near the river.

== Demographics ==
Historical population
Census	Pop.	Note	%±
1880	196		—
1890	299		52.6%
1900	466		55.9%
1910	1,021		119.1%
1920	979		−4.1%
1930	1,008		3.0%
1940	1,294		28.4%
1950	1,922		48.5%
1960	1,763		−8.3%
1970	1,881		6.7%
1980	2,249		19.6%
1990	3,979		76.9%
2000	5,561		39.8%
2010	6,127		10.2%
2020	4,639	(Note: The 2010 population estimate includes a large group-quarters population tabulated in adult correctional facilities, while the 2020 estimate doesn't. The decline is likely due to a change in census tabulation criteria rather than genuine population decline.)	−24.3%
U.S. Decennial Census

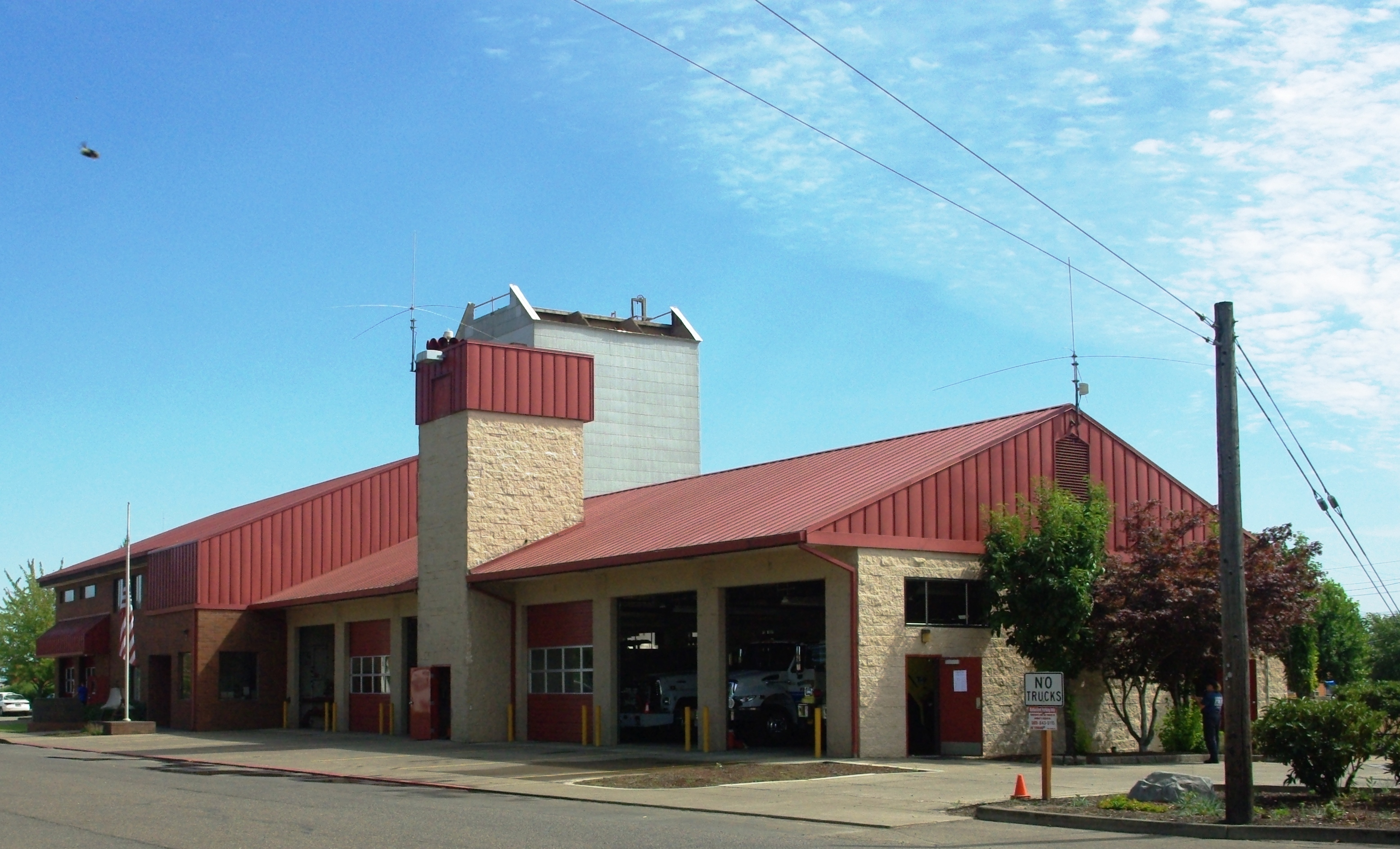
Sheridan's fire station

=== 2020 census ===
As of the 2020 census, Sheridan had a population of 4,639. The median age was 38.1 years. 23.6% of residents were under the age of 18 and 16.6% of residents were 65 years of age or older. For every 100 females there were 99.9 males, and for every 100 females age 18 and over there were 96.5 males age 18 and over.

99.5% of residents lived in urban areas, while 0.5% lived in rural areas.

There were 1,636 households in Sheridan, of which 32.8% had children under the age of 18 living in them. Of all households, 45.5% were married-couple households, 18.1% were households with a male householder and no spouse or partner present, and 27.0% were households with a female householder and no spouse or partner present. About 25.6% of all households were made up of individuals and 12.7% had someone living alone who was 65 years of age or older.

There were 1,732 housing units, of which 5.5% were vacant. Among occupied housing units, 59.4% were owner-occupied and 40.6% were renter-occupied. The homeowner vacancy rate was 1.9% and the rental vacancy rate was 4.3%.

Racial composition as of the 2020 census
Race	Number	Percent
White	3,664	79.0%
Black or African American	25	0.5%
American Indian and Alaska Native	207	4.5%
Asian	56	1.2%
Native Hawaiian and Other Pacific Islander	7	0.2%
Some other race	207	4.5%
Two or more races	473	10.2%
Hispanic or Latino (of any race)	499	10.8%

=== 2010 census ===
As of the census of 2010, there were 6,127 people, 1,543 households, and 1,085 families residing in the city. The population density was 3,126.0 inhabitants per square mile (1,207.0/km^{2}). There were 1,671 housing units at an average density of 852.6 per square mile (329.2/km^{2}). The racial makeup of the city was 74.9% White, 5.5% African American, 4.8% Native American, 2.1% Asian, 0.7% Pacific Islander, 7.6% from other races, and 4.4% from two or more races. Hispanic or Latino of any race were 16.6% of the population.

There were 1,543 households, of which 41.0% had children under the age of 18 living with them, 48.0% were married couples living together, 15.4% had a female householder with no husband present, 6.9% had a male householder with no wife present, and 29.7% were non-families. 23.0% of all households were made up of individuals, and 8.9% had someone living alone who was 65 years of age or older. The average household size was 2.77 and the average family size was 3.22.

The median age in the city was 35.7 years. 20.5% of residents were under the age of 18; 8.8% were between the ages of 18 and 24; 38% were from 25 to 44; 23.8% were from 45 to 64; and 8.9% were 65 years of age or older. The gender makeup of the city was 63.8% male and 36.2% female.

The average household size was 2.92, while the median income for a household in the city was $49,940.

== Education ==
=== Primary and secondary schools ===
==== Public schools ====
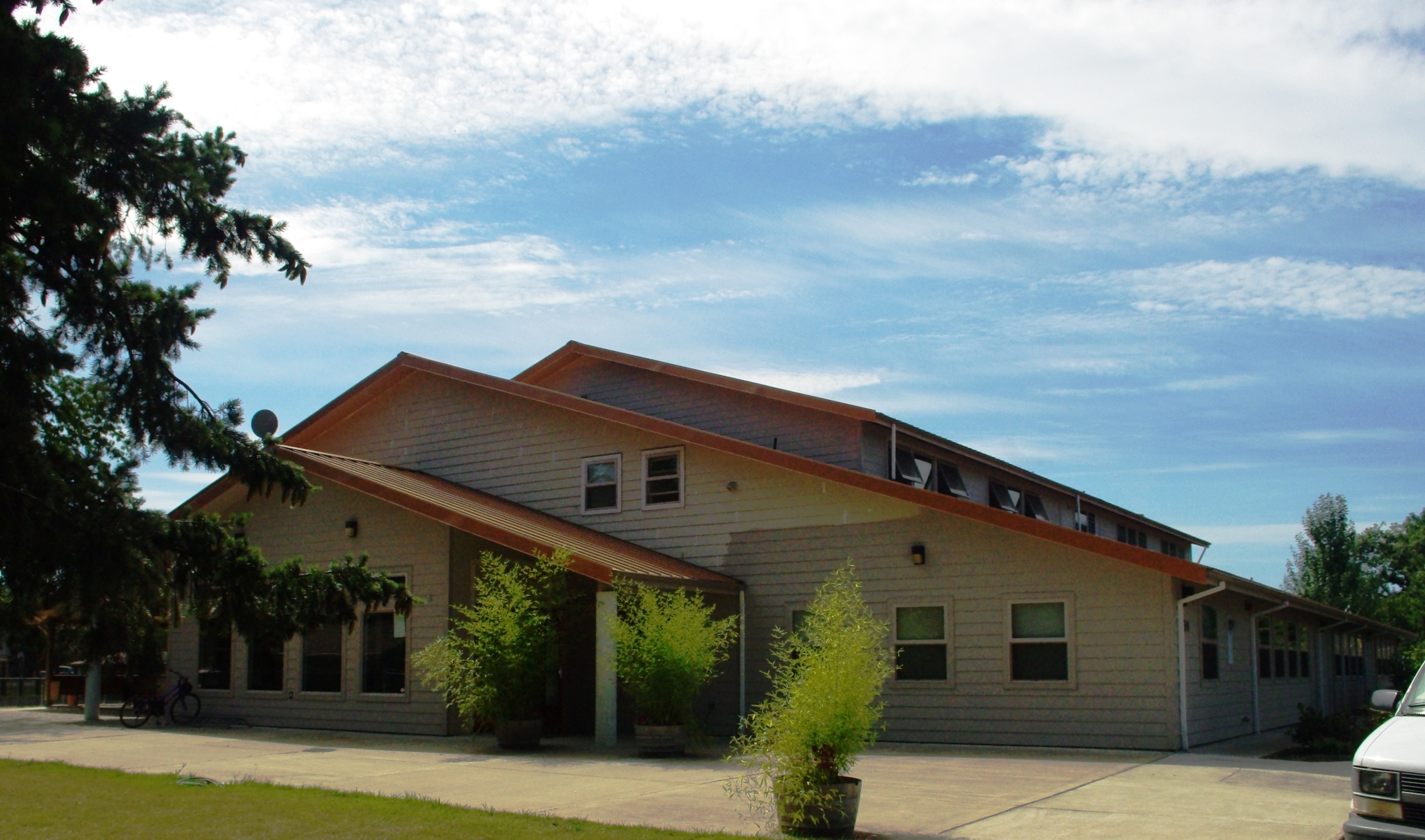
Sheridan Japanese School

Sheridan is served by the Sheridan School District, which includes four schools. The Faulconer-Chapman School serves 608 students in grades kindergarten through eighth. Sheridan High School is the main high school, with students in grades nine through twelve. Known as the Spartans, the Class 3A school has an enrollment of 287. Opportunity House house is an alternative high school with 49 students in grades ten through twelve, while the Sheridan Japanese School (a charter school) had 88 students in grades four through twelve. As of 2008, the district had 1,042 students and 69 staff members. But in June 2022, the school shut down permanently due to finance problems and not enough students applying to the school the year after.

==== Private schools ====
The Delphian School, a K-12 Scientology-affiliated private school, is located in unincorporated Yamhill County, near Sheridan. The school uses the study methods known as Study Tech that were developed by Church of Scientology founder L. Ron Hubbard. Enrollment at the kindergarten through twelfth grade school is 260 students, which includes a majority of students living in dorms on the campus.

=== Colleges and universities ===
There are no colleges in Sheridan, but the city is within the Chemeketa Community College district that includes a campus in McMinnville. Linfield College, also in McMinnville, is the closest four-year college with Western Oregon University in Monmouth, Willamette University in Salem, and George Fox University in Newberg all located in the surrounding areas.

== Culture ==
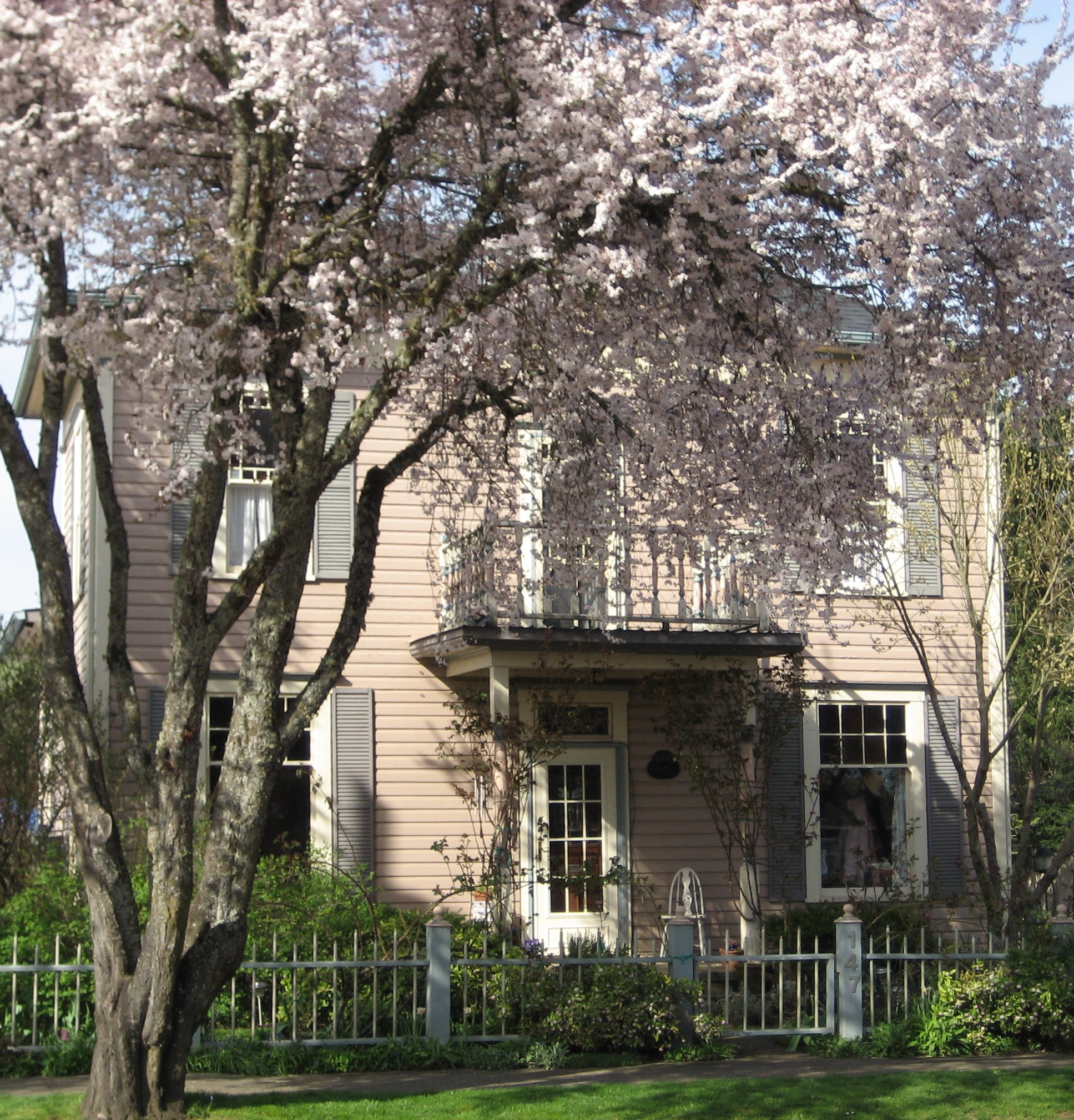
Travelers Home on the National Register of Historic Places

Built in 1892, Travelers Home on northeast Yamhill was added to the National Register of Historic Places (NRHP) in 1982, and is the only building on the NRHP in Sheridan (as of 2011). The city operates a single branch public library at Bridge and Yamhill streets on the north side of the city. The library is a member of the Chemeketa Cooperative Regional Library Service and is housed in a 3,000-square-foot (280 m^{2}), one-story building. In 2007, it had a collection of 33,792 items with a circulation of 187,000 among 4,256 registered users.

The local newspaper is the once per week The Sun, published on Wednesdays. The paper was founded in 1890 and has a circulation of 1,263. Broadcast radio and television stations from Portland are also available, as is the regional newspaper The Oregonian, also from Portland.

The city hosts two main annual events, Sheridan Hometown Days and the Mud Drags. Hometown Days takes place over a weekend each June and includes a parade. Most events are held at the high school and includes carnival type activities and rides. The Mud Drags are held in early June and sponsored by the local Rotary International group. Competitors race vehicles through the mud to win prize money. The event draws crowds of 4,000 and includes a children's race through the mud.

Civic groups include those involved in history, fraternal groups, and commercial promotion. The Sheridan Museum of History is a building-less group with a collection of artifacts and photographs displayed in borrowed space, including at the Yamhill County Historical Society Museum in McMinnville. Commercial groups include the Sheridan Chamber of Commerce and the West Valley Chamber of Commerce. Other civic groups include the Rotary International club, the Kiwanis, a Rebekah Lodge, and the Woman's Study Club of Sheridan.

== McMinnville UFO Photographs ==
In May 1950, the Sheridan farm of Paul and Evelyn Trent was the scene of the famous UFO sighting which produced the controversial McMinnville UFO photographs, first published in the McMinnville Telephone-Register and later in Life Magazine. Although these pictures have come to be known as "The McMinville UFO Photographs", the Trent farm was actually located in Sheridan, not McMinnville, which is approximately 13 miles to the northeast of Sheridan.

== Notable people ==
The city is home to several notable people. Barbara Roberts, who served in the state legislature and as Oregon Secretary of State before election as Governor of Oregon grew up in Sheridan and graduated from Sheridan High School. High jumper Joni Huntley also graduated from the high school and won a bronze medal at the 1984 Summer Olympics in Los Angeles, California. Wally Heider, recording engineer and recording studio owner, who recorded musicians from the Big Band era to the Grateful Dead and whose work advanced the state of the art of musical recording, grew up in Sheridan, before attending the University of Oregon.

== See also ==
- Oregonian Railway
- Sheridan Sun
