= Airlie, Oregon =

Unincorporated community in the state of Oregon, United States

Coordinates: 44°45′01″N 123°19′53″W

Airlie is an unincorporated community in Polk County, Oregon, United States.

The community was named for David Ogilvy, 10th Earl of Airlie of Scotland, who was president of the narrow-gauge Oregonian Railway Company. Airlie was the southern terminus of the railroad. The tracks were later widened to standard gauge and the line was bought by the Southern Pacific Railroad, which removed the Airlie branch by 1929. Airlie post office was established in 1882 and ran intermittently until 1943.

== The Airlie Red Flesh ==
A cultivar of domesticated apple, the Airlie Red Flesh, originated in Airlie.
