= Perrydale, Oregon =

Unincorporated community in Oregon, US

Coordinates: 45°02′33″N 123°15′20″W

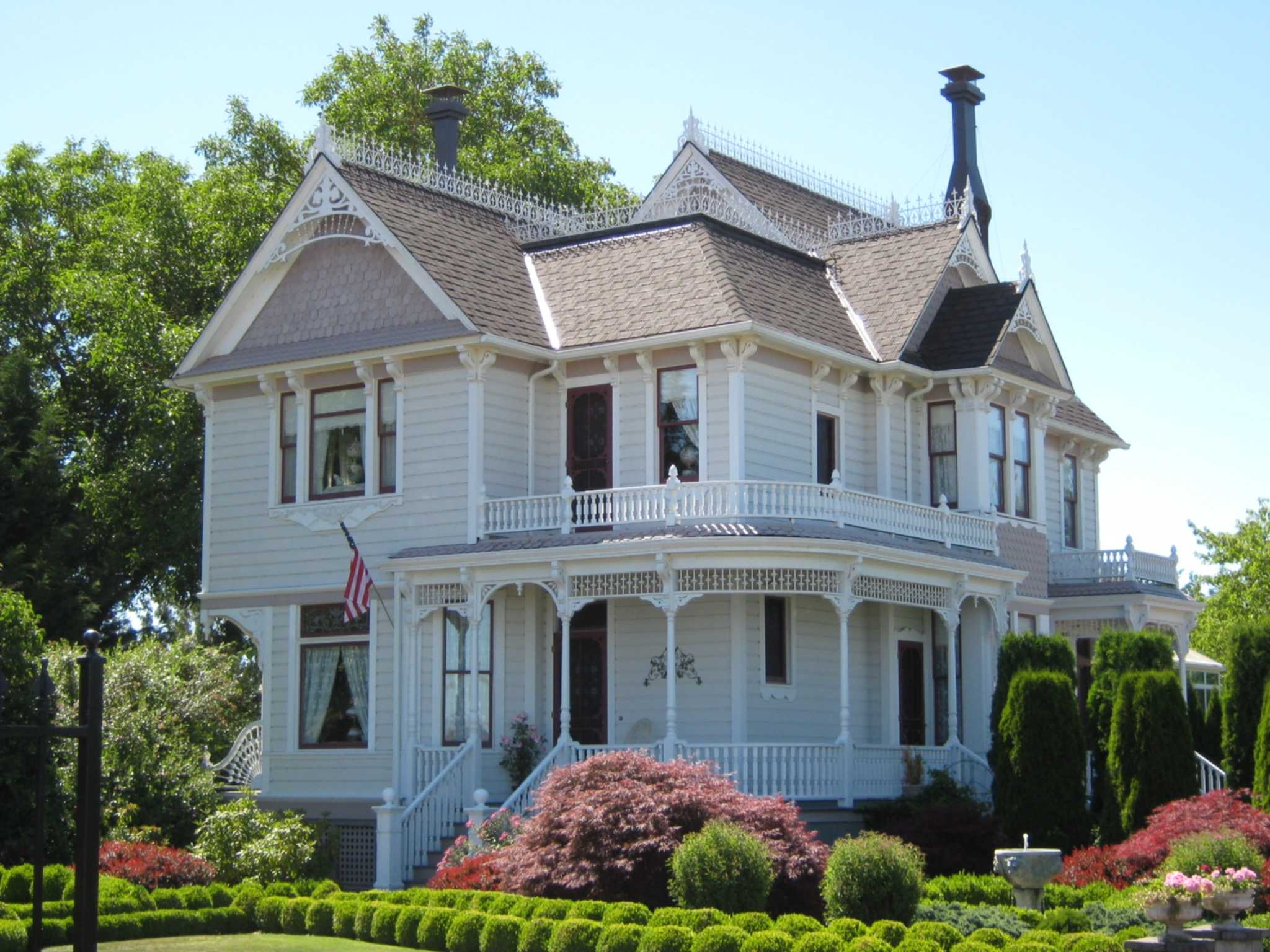
Victorian house in Perrydale

Perrydale is an unincorporated community in Polk County, Oregon, United States. It is approximately 10 miles from Dallas. It is part of the Salem Metropolitan Statistical Area.

== History ==
Perrydale was formed from the Townsend, Kinsey, and Butler donation land claims; the Townsend claim was deeded to Narcis Provo, who then deeded it to William Perry, after whom the community was named by John McGrew, who had bought Perry's claim and platted the town of Perrydale. Beginning in 1881, the town was the site of a station on the Airlie branch of the Oregonian Railway Company. Rail service to Perrydale ended in 1985.

The Perrydale post office ran from 1870 until 1971. Today, locations in Perrydale have Amity, Oregon, mailing addresses.

Near Perrydale are the Perrydale Hills, a wine-growing location that was expected to become an American Viticultural Area (AVA). The new AVA was instead named the Van Duzer Corridor AVA, because there was a requirement that the name must appear in print, and although the locals know the area as Perrydale Hills, no print references could be found.

== Education ==
Perrydale School District is a single-school district that serves Perrydale School.
