= Oregonian Railway =

Former railway in Oregon, U.S.

The Oregonian Railway was a 3 ft (914 mm) narrow gauge railroad in the Willamette Valley in the U.S. state of Oregon.

== History ==
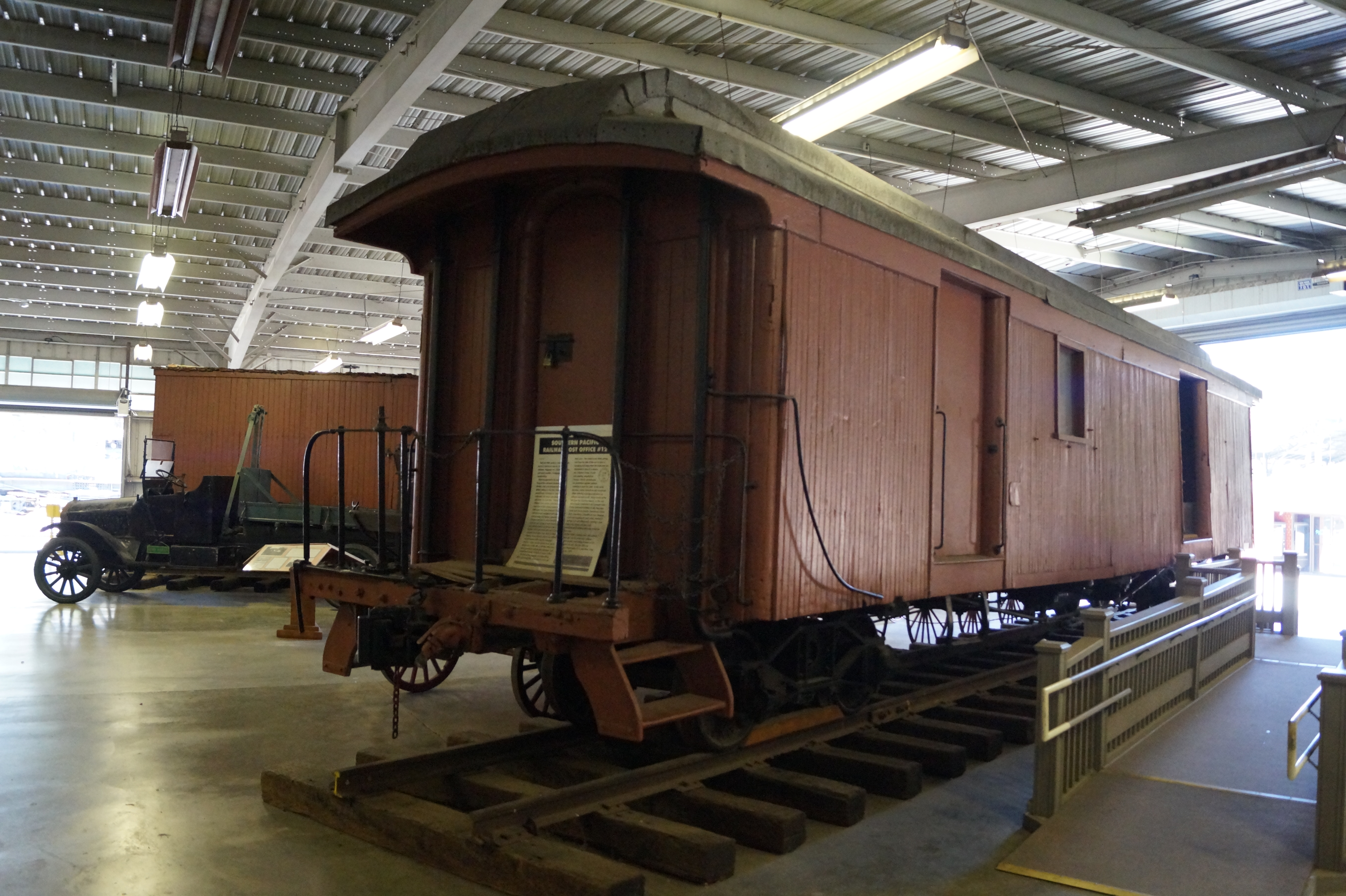
Oregonian Railway #3 at Travel Town, Los Angeles.

A group of Scottish capitalists formed the Oregonian Railway Company, Limited after purchasing the bankrupt Dayton, Sheridan and Grande Ronde Railroad in 1879.

The first changes made were to move the Dayton terminal, on the Yamhill River, to Fulquartz Landing on the Willamette River. On the opposite bank of the Willamette, the railroad built Ray's Landing. This became the north terminus of the narrow gauge line on the east side of the Willamette valley. The line connected towns such as St. Paul, Woodburn, Silverton, Brownsville, and Coburg.

The railroad also expanded the westside line south to reach Perrydale, Dallas, Monmouth, Independence and Airlie. The stop at the end of the line was named after the Earl of Airlie, the leader of the Scottish capitalists.

Revenues were dropping, and by 1886 or 1887 the railroad granted a long-term lease to Henry Villard of the Oregon & California Railroad. In later years, Villard would leave the Oregon railroad scene and the line came to be under the control of Southern Pacific Railroad.

== Rolling stock ==
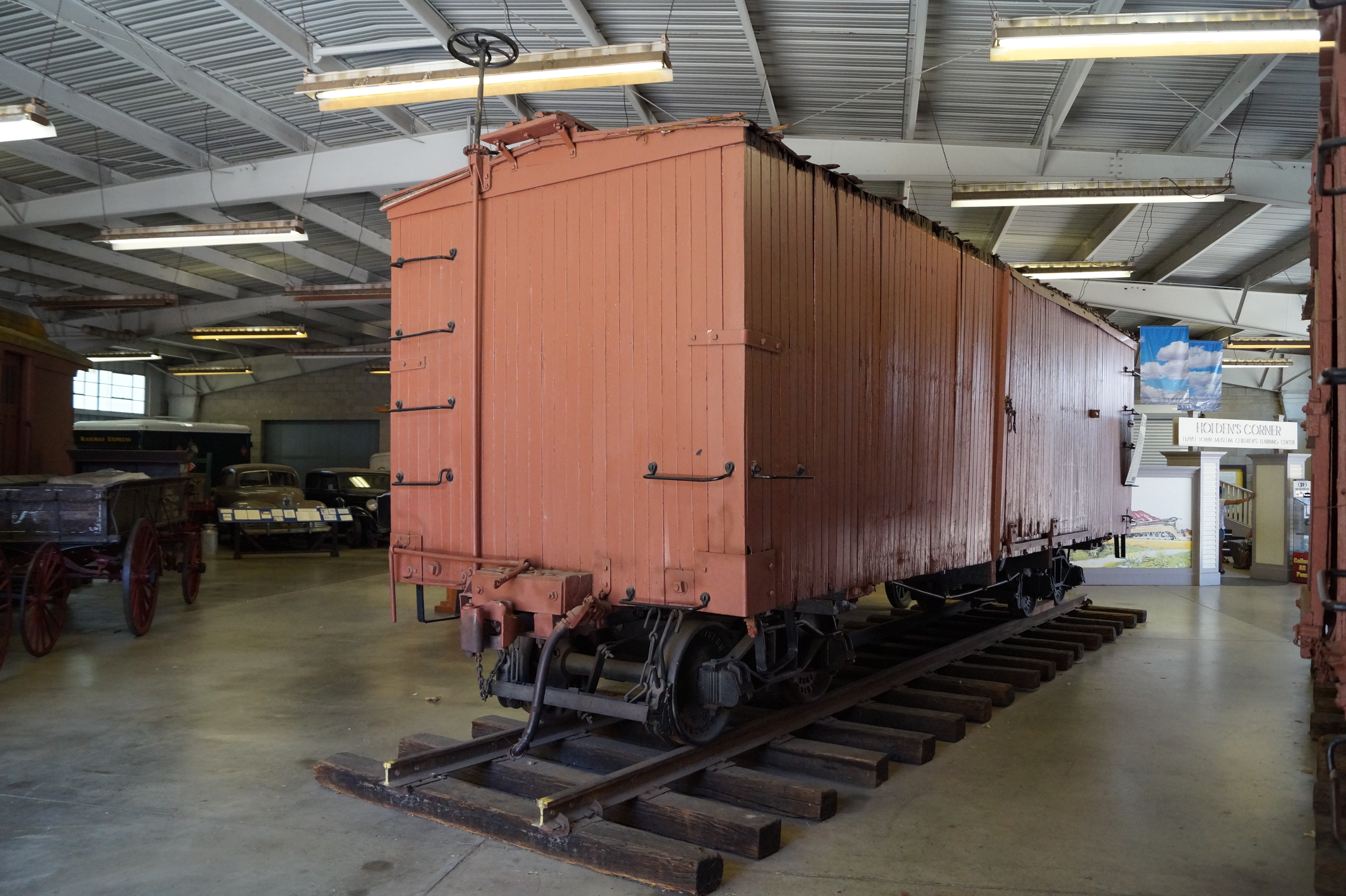
Oregonian Railway #86, at Travel Town in Los Angeles.

Two former Oregonian Railway cars are preserved at the Travel Town Museum in Los Angeles:

- Oregonian boxcar #86, built by Carter Brothers in 1890. This car later became Southern Pacific narrow-gauge boxcar #1.
- Oregonian coach #3, built by Carter Brothers in 1880. This car later became Southern Pacific railway post office car #12.

Both were donated to the museum in 1960 by the Southern Pacific Company.

== See also ==
- List of defunct Oregon railroads
- Portland and Willamette Valley Railway
- William Reid (Scottish businessman)
