= Yamhill County, Oregon =

County in Oregon, United States

- County
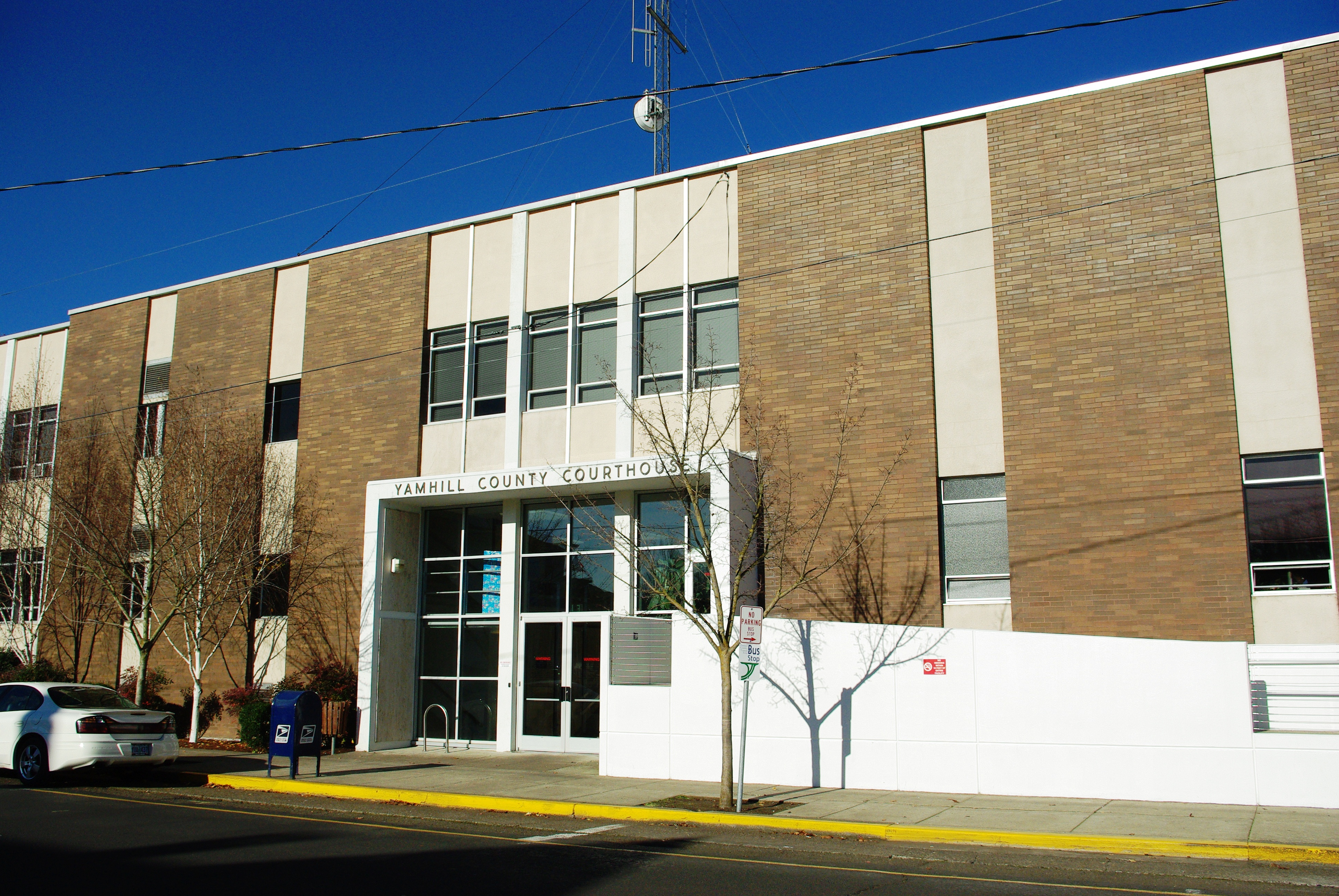
- Yamhill County Courthouse in McMinnville

- Location within the U.S. state of Oregon
- Coordinates: 45°14′N 123°19′W
- Country: United States
- State: Oregon
- Founded: July 5, 1843
- Named for: Yamhela people of the Kalapuya
- Seat: McMinnville
- Largest city: McMinnville

Area
  - Total: 718 sq mi (1,860 km^{2})
  - Land: 716 sq mi (1,850 km^{2})
  - Water: 2.5 sq mi (6.5 km^{2}) 0.3%

Population (2020)
  - Total: 107,722
  - Estimate (2025): 110,024 ▲
  - Density: 139/sq mi (54/km^{2})
- Time zone: UTC−8 (Pacific)
  - Summer (DST): UTC−7 (PDT)
- Congressional district: 6th
- Website: www.yamhillcounty.gov

Yamhill County is one of the 36 counties in the U.S. state of Oregon. As of the 2020 census, the population was 107,722. The county seat is McMinnville. Yamhill County was named after the Yamhelas, members of the Kalapuya Tribe.

Yamhill County is part of the Portland-Vancouver-Hillsboro, OR-WA Metropolitan Statistical Area. It is in the Willamette Valley.

== History ==
The earliest known inhabitants of the area were the Yamhill (Yamhelas Indian Tribe, part of the Kalapooian family) Indians, who have inhabited the area for over 8,000 years. They are one of the tribes incorporated into the Confederated Tribes of the Grand Ronde. In 1857 they were forced to migrate to the Grand Ronde Indian Reservation created in Oregon's Coastal Range two years earlier.

The earliest non-native settlers were employees of the various fur companies operating in Oregon Country, who started settling there around 1814. But it was the establishment of the Oregon Trail that led to significant migration to the area.

Yamhill District (later county) was created on July 5, 1843, five years before the Oregon Territory was established. It was one of the original four districts created by Oregon's first Provisional Legislature, along with Twality (later Washington), Clackamas, and Champooick (later Marion) counties. The district was originally spread over 12,000 square miles (31,000 km^{2}), an area that was broken up into twelve present-day counties.

Lafayette, the principal trading center of the western Willamette Valley in early Oregon history, was made the county seat in 1847. The county government was later (1889) moved to McMinnville where it remains today.

The Mount Hebo Air Force Station was a Cold War air defense installation from 1956 to 1980. Located next to Tillamook County, at the top of 3,154-foot (961 m) high Mount Hebo, Air Force radars operated by the 689th Radar Squadron and the 14th Missile Warning Squadron were essential parts of the nation's integrated air defenses. The large radomes protecting the radars from adverse weather effects could be seen silhouetted against the sky from many parts of Yamhill County.

=== Lock and dam on the Yamhill River ===
In 1900 the Yamhill River lock and dam was completed about 1.5 miles (2.4 km) downriver from Lafayette, Oregon. The lock was decommissioned in 1954. The dam was demolished in 1963 to allow better passage for salmon on the river. The site of the lock and dam is now a county park.

== Geography ==
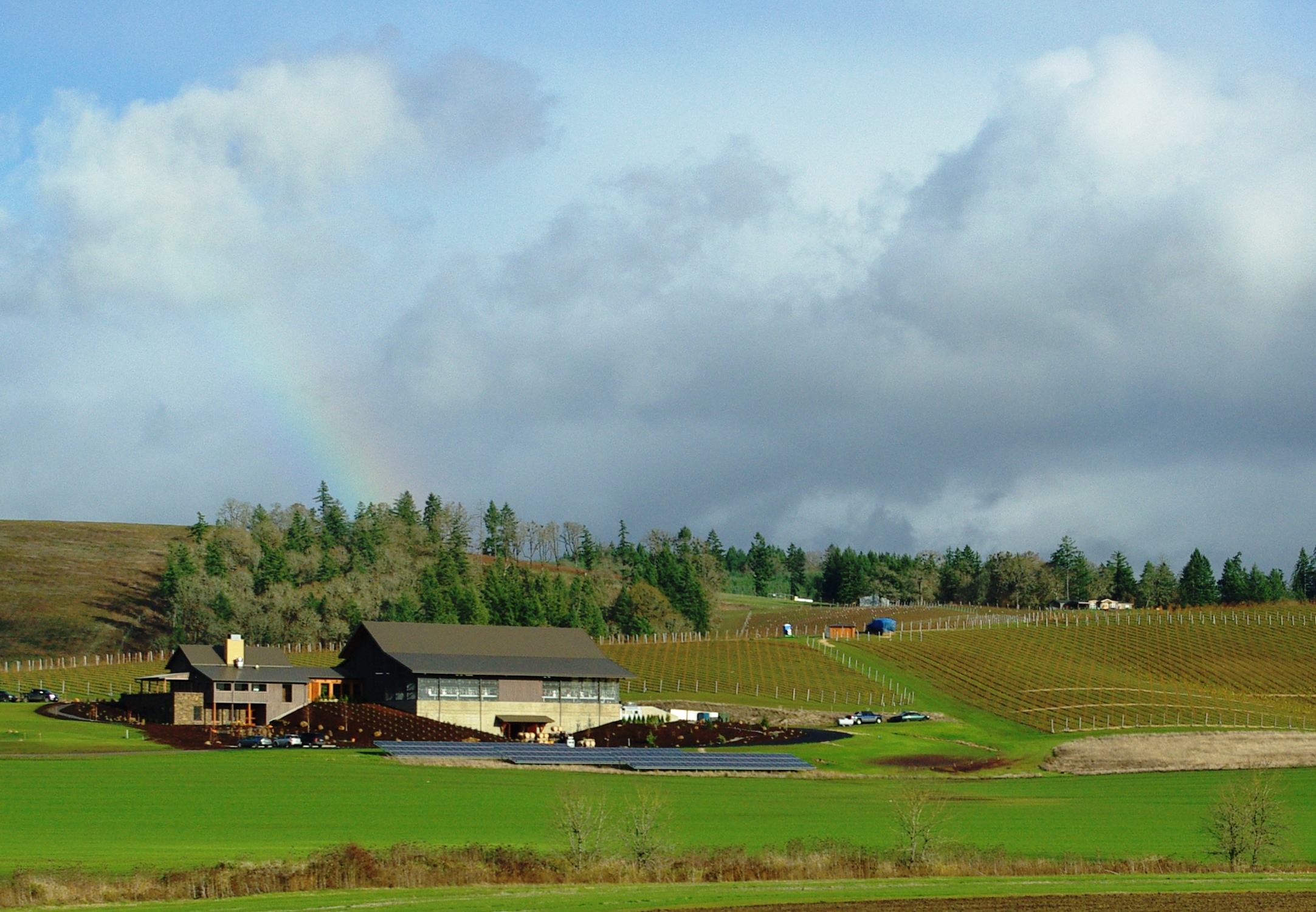
Soléna and Grand Cru Estates winery

According to the United States Census Bureau, the county has a total area of 718 square miles (1,860 km^{2}), of which 716 square miles (1,850 km^{2}) is land and 2.5 square miles (6.5 km^{2}), or 0.3%, is water. It is the fifth-smallest county in Oregon by area.

The tallest mountain in the county is Trask Mountain in the northwest corner of the county.

=== Adjacent counties ===
- Washington County (north)
- Clackamas County (east)
- Marion County (southeast)
- Polk County (south)
- Tillamook County (west)

=== National protected areas ===
- Siuslaw National Forest (part)
- Tualatin River National Wildlife Refuge (part)

== Demographics ==
Historical population
Census	Pop.	Note	%±
1860	3,245		—
1870	5,012		54.5%
1880	7,945		58.5%
1890	10,692		34.6%
1900	13,420		25.5%
1910	18,285		36.3%
1920	20,529		12.3%
1930	22,036		7.3%
1940	26,336		19.5%
1950	33,484		27.1%
1960	32,478		−3.0%
1970	40,213		23.8%
1980	55,332		37.6%
1990	65,551		18.5%
2000	84,992		29.7%
2010	99,193		16.7%
2020	107,722		8.6%
2025 (est.)	110,024	▲	2.1%
U.S. Decennial Census; 1790–1960 1900–1990; 1990–2000 2010–2020

=== 2020 census ===
As of the 2020 census, the county had a population of 107,722. Of the residents, 21.7% were under the age of 18 and 18.5% were 65 years of age or older; the median age was 39.5 years. For every 100 females there were 99.4 males, and for every 100 females age 18 and over there were 97.6 males. 73.5% of residents lived in urban areas and 26.5% lived in rural areas.

The racial makeup of the county was 77.7% White, 0.8% Black or African American, 1.8% American Indian and Alaska Native, 1.5% Asian, 0.2% Native Hawaiian and Pacific Islander, 7.6% from some other race, and 10.4% from two or more races. Hispanic or Latino residents of any race comprised 16.5% of the population.

There were 38,011 households in the county, of which 31.8% had children under the age of 18 living with them and 23.6% had a female householder with no spouse or partner present. About 21.9% of all households were made up of individuals and 11.4% had someone living alone who was 65 years of age or older.

There were 40,123 housing units, of which 5.3% were vacant. Among occupied housing units, 68.5% were owner-occupied and 31.5% were renter-occupied. The homeowner vacancy rate was 0.9% and the rental vacancy rate was 5.2%.

Yamhill County, Oregon – Racial and ethnic composition Note: the US Census treats Hispanic/Latino as an ethnic category. This table excludes Latinos from the racial categories and assigns them to a separate category. Hispanics/Latinos may be of any race.
Race / Ethnicity (NH = Non-Hispanic)	Pop 1980	Pop 1990	Pop 2000	Pop 2010	Pop 2020	% 1980	% 1990	% 2000	% 2010	% 2020
White alone (NH)	52,389	59,538	71,684	78,448	79,352	94.68%	90.83%	84.34%	79.09%	73.66%
Black or African American alone (NH)	135	344	592	784	849	0.24%	0.52%	0.70%	0.79%	0.79%
Native American or Alaska Native alone (NH)	424	756	1,134	1,272	1,346	0.77%	1.15%	1.33%	1.28%	1.25%
Asian alone (NH)	396	760	889	1,418	1,523	0.72%	1.16%	1.05%	1.43%	1.41%
Native Hawaiian or Pacific Islander alone (NH)	x	x	91	163	189	x	x	0.11%	0.16%	0.18%
Other race alone (NH)	157	24	76	143	615	0.28%	0.04%	0.09%	0.14%	0.57%
Mixed race or Multiracial (NH)	x	x	1,509	2,373	6,055	x	x	1.78%	2.39%	5.62%
Hispanic or Latino (any race)	1,831	4,129	9,017	14,592	17,793	3.31%	6.30%	10.61%	14.71%	16.52%
Total	55,332	65,551	84,992	99,193	107,722	100.00%	100.00%	100.00%	100.00%	100.00%

=== 2010 census ===
As of the 2010 census, there were 99,193 people, 34,726 households, and 25,020 families living in the county. The population density was 138.6 inhabitants per square mile (53.5/km^{2}). There were 37,110 housing units at an average density of 51.8 units per square mile (20.0 units/km^{2}). The racial makeup of the county was 85.4% white, 1.5% Asian, 1.5% American Indian, 0.9% black or African American, 0.2% Pacific islander, 7.2% from other races, and 3.3% from two or more races. Those of Hispanic or Latino origin made up 14.7% of the population. In terms of ancestry, 23.6% were German, 13.7% were English, 12.2% were Irish, and 5.0% were American.

Of the 34,726 households, 35.8% had children under the age of 18 living with them, 56.0% were married couples living together, 11.1% had a female householder with no husband present, 28.0% were non-families, and 21.7% of all households were made up of individuals. The average household size was 2.70 and the average family size was 3.12. The median age was 36.8 years.

The median income for a household in the county was $52,485 and the median income for a family was $61,524. Males had a median income of $44,946 versus $33,717 for females. The per capita income for the county was $24,017. About 9.0% of families and 12.7% of the population were below the poverty line, including 16.8% of those under age 18 and 7.7% of those age 65 or over.

=== 2000 census ===
As of the 2000 census, there were 84,992 people, 28,732 households, and 21,376 families living in the county. The population density was 119 people per square mile (46 people/km^{2}). There were 30,270 housing units at an average density of 42 units per square mile (16/km^{2}). The racial makeup of the county is 88.98% White, 1.47% Native American, 1.07% Asian, 0.85% Black or African American, 0.12% Pacific Islander, 5.08% from other races, and 2.42% from two or more races. 10.61% of the population were Hispanic or Latino of any race. 19.6% were of German, 11.4% English, 9.5% American and 8.4% Irish ancestry.

There were 28,732 households, out of which 37.40% had children under the age of 18 living with them, 60.00% were married couples living together, 9.90% had a female householder with no husband present, and 25.60% were non-families. 19.70% of all households were made up of individuals, and 8.40% had someone living alone who was 65 years of age or older. The average household size was 2.78 and the average family size was 3.17.

In the county, the population was spread out, with 26.90% under the age of 18, 11.40% from 18 to 24, 28.50% from 25 to 44, 21.40% from 45 to 64, and 11.70% who were 65 years of age or older. The median age was 34 years. For every 100 females, there were 102.20 males. For every 100 females age 18 and over, there were 101.30 males.

The median income for a household in the county is $44,111, and the median income for a family was $50,336. Males had a median income of $35,686 versus $25,254 for females. The per capita income for the county was $18,951. About 6.00% of families and 9.20% of the population were below the poverty line, including 10.10% of those under age 18 and 7.50% of those age 65 or over.

== Politics ==
In the United States House of Representatives, Yamhill County lies in Oregon's 6th congressional district, which also covers Polk County and portions of Marion, Clackamas, and Washington counties. In the Oregon State Senate, the county is split between the 12th and 13th districts. Within the Oregon House of Representatives, Yamhill County is part of the 23rd, 24th, and 26th districts.

Although located west of the Cascades, Yamhill has remained a Republican-leaning county in Presidential elections at the same time as other Western Oregon counties have become solidly to powerfully Democratic. No Democratic presidential candidate has won Yamhill County since Lyndon Johnson's 1964 landslide, and the only other Democrats to carry the county since Oregon's statehood have been Franklin Roosevelt in 1940, 1936 and 1932, along with Woodrow Wilson in 1912 when the Republican vote was divided.

Yamhill County is currently one of 11 counties in Oregon in which therapeutic psilocybin is legal.

United States presidential election results for Yamhill County, Oregon
Year	Republican		Democratic		Third party(ies)	
Year	No.	%	No.	%	No.	%
1880	1,057	52.88%	942	47.12%	0	0.00%
1884	1,184	52.23%	1,034	45.61%	49	2.16%
1888	1,298	54.33%	994	41.61%	97	4.06%
1892	1,469	46.15%	682	21.43%	1,032	32.42%
1896	1,782	48.93%	1,736	47.67%	124	3.40%
1900	1,583	52.40%	1,235	40.88%	203	6.72%
1904	2,004	63.14%	652	20.54%	518	16.32%
1908	1,980	54.49%	1,246	34.29%	408	11.23%
1912	1,312	31.27%	1,378	32.84%	1,506	35.89%
1916	4,010	49.95%	3,342	41.63%	676	8.42%
1920	4,102	59.49%	2,353	34.13%	440	6.38%
1924	3,803	53.11%	2,015	28.14%	1,342	18.74%
1928	5,248	67.97%	2,382	30.85%	91	1.18%
1932	3,584	41.11%	4,798	55.03%	337	3.87%
1936	3,443	35.88%	5,366	55.92%	787	8.20%
1940	5,545	49.48%	5,566	49.67%	96	0.86%
1944	5,672	51.39%	5,067	45.91%	298	2.70%
1948	6,379	55.33%	4,794	41.59%	355	3.08%
1952	9,332	67.27%	4,472	32.24%	68	0.49%
1956	8,555	61.96%	5,253	38.04%	0	0.00%
1960	8,295	59.98%	5,528	39.97%	6	0.04%
1964	5,508	38.08%	8,949	61.88%	6	0.04%
1968	7,936	55.55%	5,487	38.41%	862	6.03%
1972	9,660	58.51%	6,008	36.39%	841	5.09%
1976	9,885	50.38%	8,881	45.27%	854	4.35%
1980	12,054	51.15%	8,694	36.89%	2,820	11.97%
1984	15,797	62.31%	9,450	37.28%	104	0.41%
1988	13,321	52.47%	11,423	44.99%	644	2.54%
1992	11,693	37.23%	11,148	35.50%	8,565	27.27%
1996	13,900	44.64%	13,078	42.00%	4,157	13.35%
2000	19,193	54.01%	14,254	40.11%	2,092	5.89%
2004	23,839	56.57%	17,572	41.70%	731	1.73%
2008	21,390	49.14%	20,797	47.78%	1,339	3.08%
2012	22,045	51.38%	19,260	44.89%	1,602	3.73%
2016	23,250	47.69%	19,301	39.59%	6,202	12.72%
2020	29,551	50.15%	27,174	46.12%	2,198	3.73%
2024	29,536	51.10%	26,011	45.00%	2,253	3.90%

== Economy ==
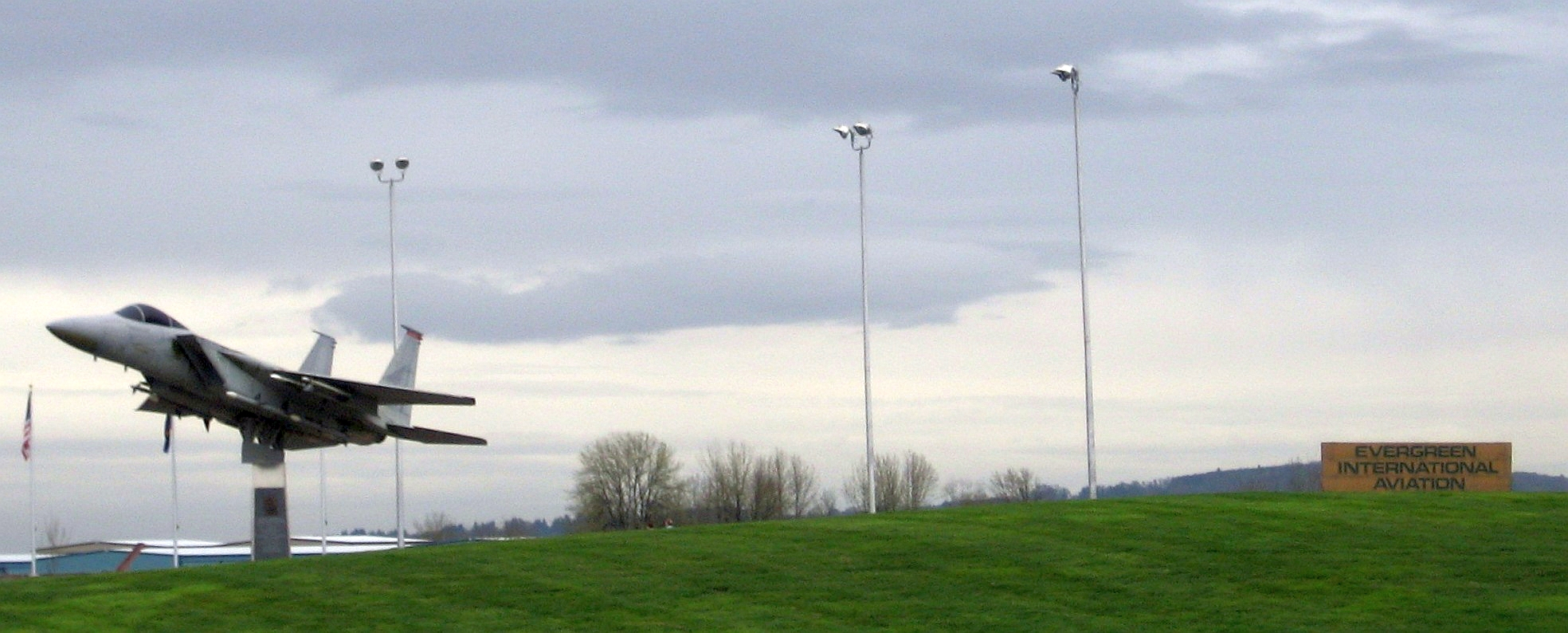
Evergreen Aviation and Space Museum

In 2019 the Oregon International Air Show switched to the McMinnville Municipal Airport. The Air Show promotes aviation while honoring the military and veterans. In addition to the economic surge provided by the Air Show, the Oregon International Air Show involves the community and provides grants for McMinnville. Since 1988 more than $3 million has donated back throughout McMinnville (Yamhill County), Hillsboro (Washington County), and throughout Oregon. Express Employment Professionals, Stoller Family Estates, and Xenium are the lead sponsors for the upcoming 2020 Air Show.

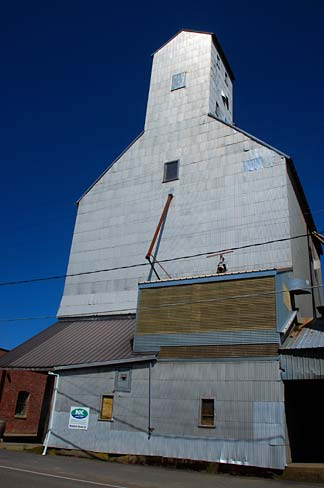
Grain elevator in Carlton, Yamhill County

The major industries of the county are agriculture, forest products, manufacturing, and education. Yamhill County's economy is supported largely by its many unionized facilities such as Cascade Steel in McMinnville and Decommissioned White Birch Paper now owned by WestRock in Newberg. It boasts a thriving wine industry and was the home of Evergreen Aviation.

Yamhill County ranks seventh out of Oregon's thirty-six counties in annual market value of its agricultural production. This agricultural production includes wheat, barley, horticulture, and dairy farming, with 13,201 acres or 53.42 square kilometres in 1997 planted in orchards. One-third of the county is covered with commercial timber, and the economic mainstay of the western part of the county is logging and timber products.

Yamhill County is a significant focus of Oregon's wine industry, having the largest area of any Oregon county planted in vineyards. Six of the state's American Viticultural Areas are wholly or partly in the county: Chehalem Mountains AVA, Dundee Hills AVA, Eola-Amity Hills AVA, McMinnville AVA, Ribbon Ridge AVA, and Yamhill-Carlton District AVA. Over 80 wineries and 200 vineyards represent the largest concentration of wine growers and producers in any county in the state. Vineyards often specialize in Pinot noir, but other varieties grown include Pinot gris, Pinot blanc, Chardonnay, Riesling, and Gewürztraminer.

== Education ==
Yamhill County Institutions of Higher Education (IHEs) include Linfield University and Chemeketa Community College McMinnville Campus, along with George Fox University and Portland Community College in Newberg.

All of Yamhill County is within the Chemeketa Community College district.

K-12 school districts include:

- Amity School District 4J
- Dayton School District 8
- Gaston School District 511J
- McMinnville School District 40
- Nestucca Valley School District 101J
- Newberg-Dundee Public Schools
- Sheridan School District 48J
- Willamina School District 30J
- Yamhill Carlton School District 1

For private secondary education the county is served by The Delphian School in Sheridan.

== Communities ==
=== Cities ===
- Amity
- Carlton
- Dayton
- Dundee
- Lafayette
- McMinnville (county seat)
- Newberg
- Sheridan
- Willamina
- Yamhill

=== Census-designated places ===
- Fort Hill
- Grand Ronde

=== Unincorporated communities ===
- Bellevue
- Cove Orchard
- Eola Crest
- Eola Village
- Gopher
- Grand Ronde Agency
- Hopewell
- Lunnville
- Midway
- Riverside
- Saint Joseph
- Shipley
- Springbrook
- Sunnycrest
- Unionvale
- Wheatland
- Whiteson

== See also ==
- National Register of Historic Places listings in Yamhill County, Oregon
- Yamhill County Courthouse
