= Sesame Donuts =

Doughnut shop chain in the U.S. state of Oregon

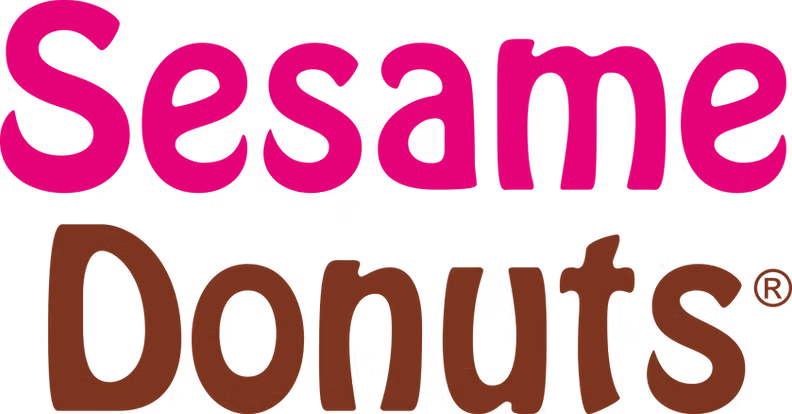

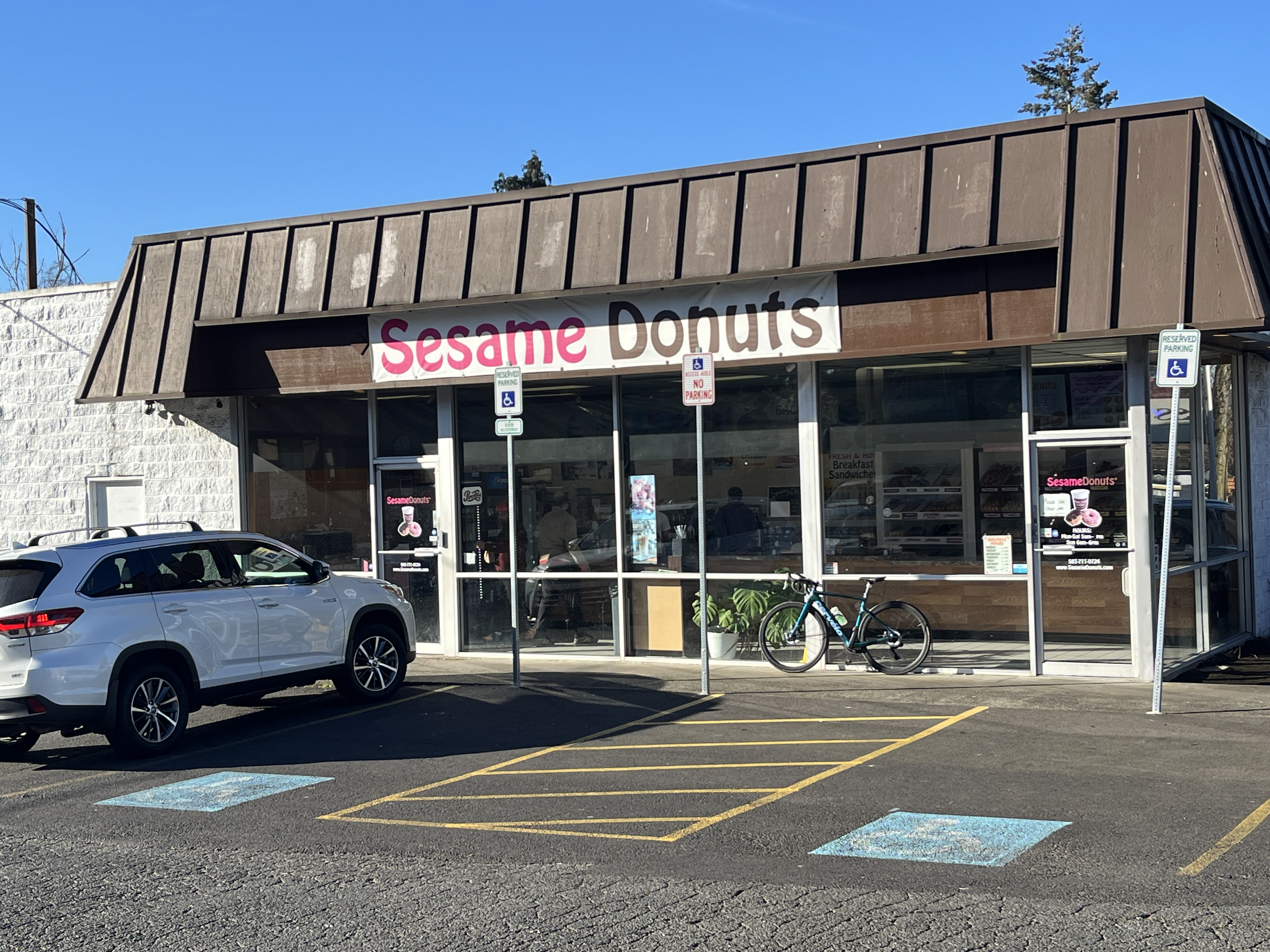
- Exterior of the shop on Powell Boulevard in southeast Portland, Oregon, in 2025
- Interactive map of Sesame Donuts

Restaurant information
- Established: 1999
- Location: Oregon, United States
- Website: sesamedonuts.com

Sesame Donuts is a chain of doughnut shops in the Portland metropolitan area, in the United States. Established in Raleigh Hills in 1999, the business has also operated in Beaverton, Hillsboro, downtown and southeast Portland, Sherwood, and Tigard.

== Description ==
The doughnut shop chain Sesame Donuts operates in the Portland metropolitan area. The original shop is located at the intersection of Southwest Beaverton-Hillsdale Highway and Scholls Ferry Road in Raleigh Hills. The Hillsboro and Sherwood locations operate inside the lobbies of public libraries. The location in southeast Portland operates on Powell Boulevard in the Creston-Kenilworth neighborhood, and the downtown location is near Portland State University. The business has also operated in Beaverton and Tigard.

Julie Lee of 1859 Oregon's Magazine described Sesame as a "community-oriented, old-school donut shop with vintage favorites" such as buttermilk and maple bars. A sesame doughnut reflects the owners' Middle Eastern heritage. The menu also includes cider doughnuts and iced coffee. Sesame has gluten-free and vegan doughnuts.

== History ==
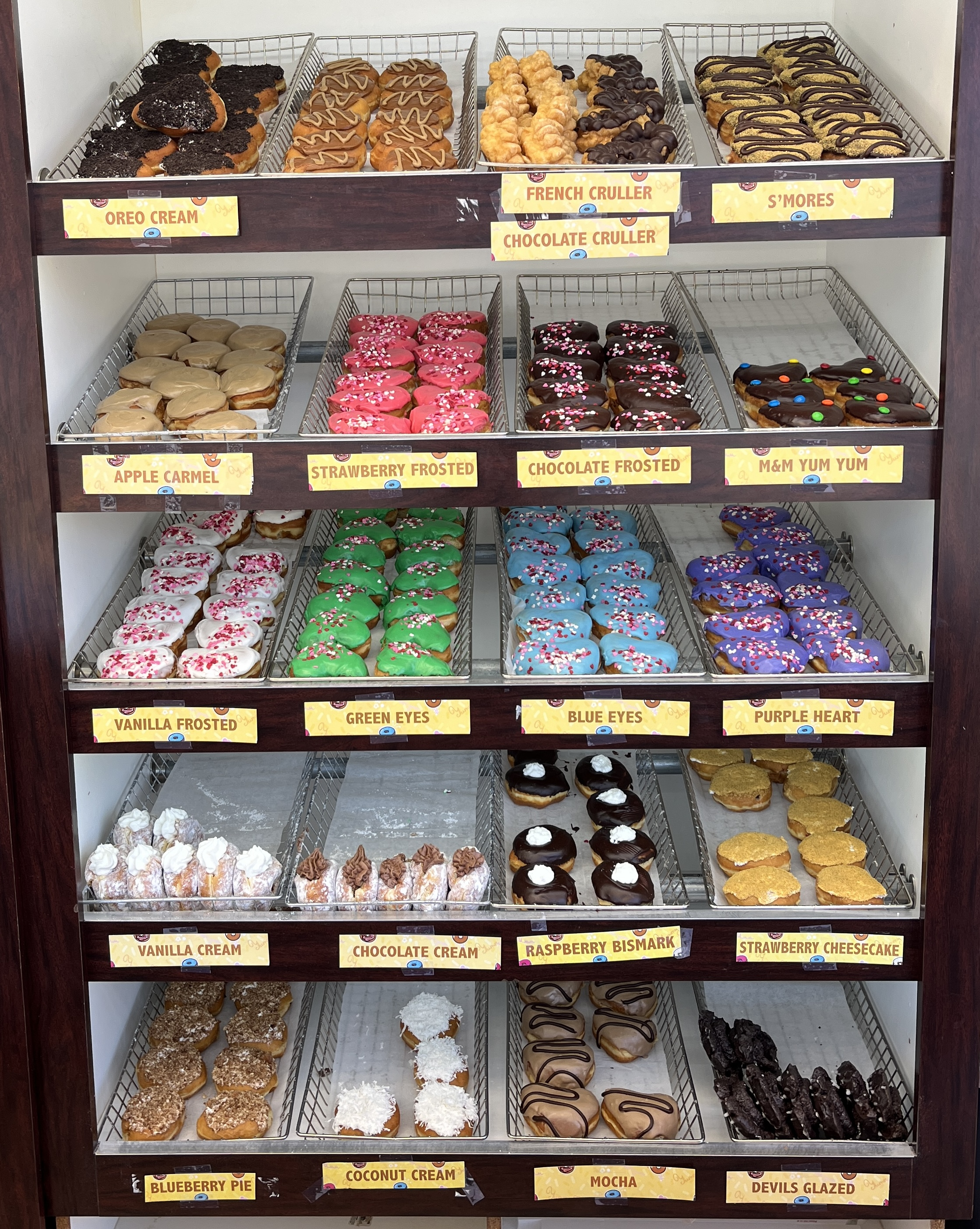
Doughnuts on display in the southeast Portland shop in 2025

Established in 1999, Sesame Donuts is owned by the Fakih family, including brothers Haidar and Said.

In 2010, there were three shops: the original in Raleigh Hills, plus those in Hillsboro and Sherwood. There were six locations in 2016 and seven locations in 2021. All locations were located west of the Willamette River, with the exception of the southeast Portland location, which opened in a former Baskin-Robbins shop in 2021. Previously, the business operated a shop on McLoughlin Boulevard south of Milwaukie, but the location closed permanently.

In 2021, an employee and customers at the southeast Portland shop fought off someone who attempted to steal the tip jar. The thief also threw a rock at the shop's window, causing glass to shatter, and pepper-sprayed the worker. In 2022, a teenager stole the tip jar from the southeast Portland shop, prompting a wave of doughnut purchases and tips from customers. U.S. President Joe Biden carried a box of Sesame doughnuts during a volunteer event with the Oregon Democrats at a Service Employees International Union (SEIU) office in Portland.

Sesame has celebrated National Donut Day by giving free doughnuts to customers.

== Reception ==
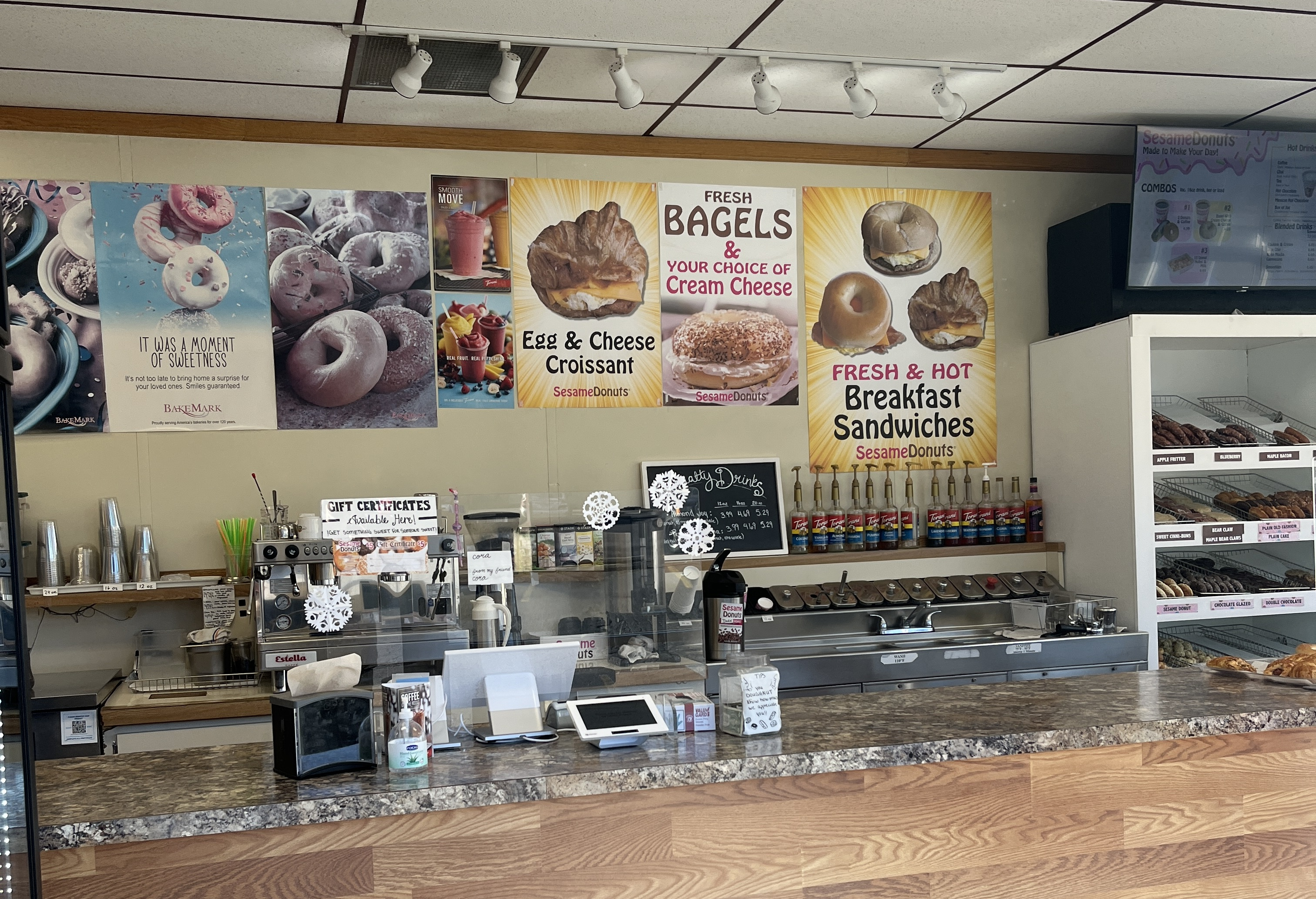
Interior of the Powell Boulevard location in 2025

In Portland Monthly's 2011 "quest for the quintessential doughnut", Anna Sachse called Sesame's donuts "mighty fine" and recommended the apple fritter, the glazed raised ring, and the pumpkin cake donut. 100 Things to Do in Portland, OR Before You Die (2016) says, "Sesame Donuts sells delicious, old-fashioned donuts, without the bells and whistles you see at the other destinations on this list. But don't underestimate Sesame, whose familiar, affordable treats have earned a loyal following."

Michael Russell ranked Sesame fifth overall in The Oregonian's overview of Portand's best doughnut shops. He ranked the raised glazed doughnut second, the fritter fourth, and the old-fashioned doughnut twelfth. Rebecca Roland and Nick Townsend included Sesame in Eater Portland's 2024 overview of the city's "most delicious" doughnuts. The writers called Sesame "the most commuter-accessible" of the listed businesses and opined, "The shop's doughnuts are reminiscent of Dunkin Donuts, but better — expect a lighter, fresher dough with more care given to glazes and toppings."

== See also ==
- List of doughnut shops
- List of restaurant chains in the United States
