= Portland metropolitan area =

Metropolitan area in the northwest US

Coordinates: 45.5°N 122.65°W

Portland Metropolitan Area
- Metropolitan Statistical Area
- Portland–Vancouver–Hillsboro, OR–WA Metropolitan Statistical Area
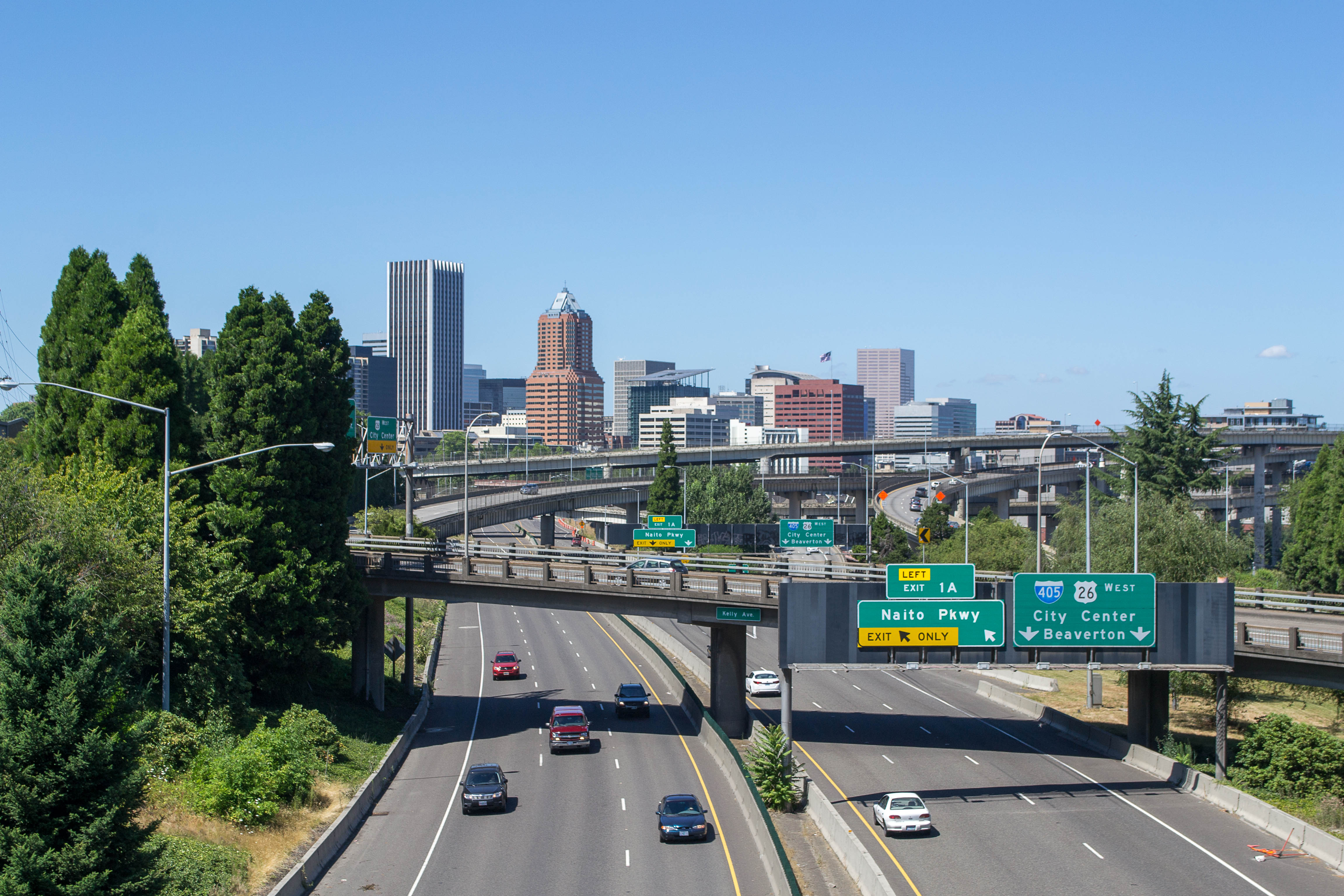
- Portland skyline from the Ross Island Bridge
Portland–Vancouver–Salem, OR–WA CSA
City of Portland
Portland–Vancouver–Hillsboro, OR–WA MSA
Salem, OR MSA
Albany, OR MSA
Longview–Kelso, WA MSA
Corvallis, OR MSA
- Country: United States
- State: Oregon; Washington
- Largest city: Portland
- Other cities: Vancouver; Gresham; Hillsboro; Beaverton; Tigard; Oregon City; Milwaukie

Area
  - Total: 6,684 sq mi (17,310 km^{2})
- Highest elevation: 11,250 ft (3,429 m)
- Lowest elevation: 0 ft (0 m)

Population (2020)
  - Total: 2,512,859
  - Estimate (2022): 2,509,489
  - Rank: 25th in the U.S.
  - Density: 330/sq mi (129/km^{2})

GDP
  - Portland (MSA): $204.3 billion (2022)
- Time zone: UTC−8 (PST)
  - Summer (DST): UTC−7 (PDT)
- Area codes: 503, 971, 360 & 564

The Portland metropolitan area is a metro area with its core in the U.S. states of Oregon and Washington. It has 5 principal cities, the largest being Portland, Oregon. The U.S. Office of Management and Budget (OMB) identifies it as the Portland–Vancouver–Hillsboro, OR–WA Metropolitan Statistical Area, a metropolitan statistical area used by the United States Census Bureau (USCB) and other entities. The OMB defines the area as comprising Clackamas, Columbia, Multnomah, Washington, and Yamhill Counties in Oregon, and Clark and Skamania Counties in Washington. The area had a population of 2,512,859 at the 2020 census, an increase of over 12% since 2010.

The Oregon portion of the metropolitan area is the state's largest urban center, while the Washington portion of the metropolitan area is the state's third-largest urban center after Seattle and Spokane (the Seattle Urban Area includes Tacoma and Everett). Portions of the Portland metro area (Clackamas, Multnomah, and Washington Counties) are under the jurisdiction of Metro, a directly elected regional government which, among other things, is responsible for land-use planning in the region.

== Metropolitan statistical area ==
Historical population
Census	Pop.	Note	%±
1860	16,751		—
1870	30,763		83.6%
1880	57,831		88.0%
1890	130,455		125.6%
1900	172,056		31.9%
1910	330,581		92.1%
1920	409,023		23.7%
1930	500,011		22.2%
1940	553,215		10.6%
1950	766,008		38.5%
1960	881,961		15.1%
1970	1,083,977		22.9%
1980	1,341,491		23.8%
1990	1,523,741		13.6%
2000	1,927,881		26.5%
2010	2,226,009		15.5%
2020	2,512,859		12.9%
2025 (est.)	2,542,282		1.2%
U.S. Decennial Census; 2020 Census

=== 2020 census ===
As of the 2020 census, there were 2,512,859 people within the MSA. The racial makeup of the Portland MSA is as follows:

- White alone: 71.5%
- Black or African American alone: 3.0%
- American Indian and Alaska Native alone: 1.1%
- Asian alone: 7.1%
- Native Hawaiian and Other Pacific Islander alone: 0.6%
- Some Other Race alone: 6.0%
- Two or more races: 10.7%

The ethnic makeup of the Portland MSA is as follows:

- Hispanic or Latino: 13.2%
- Not Hispanic or Latino: 86.8%

=== 2010 census ===
As of the 2010 census, there were 2,226,009 people, 867,794 households, and 551,008 families residing within the MSA. The racial makeup of the MSA were as follows:

- White: 76.3%
- Hispanic or Latino (of any race): 10.9% (8.5% Mexican, 0.4% Spanish or Spaniard, 0.3% Guatemalan, 0.3% Puerto Rican, 0.2% Cuban, 0.2% Salvadoran, 0.1% Peruvian)
- Asian: 5.7% (1.2% Chinese, 1.2% Vietnamese, 0.7% Indian, 0.6% Filipino, 0.6% Korean, 0.4% Japanese)
- Black or African American: 2.9%
- American Indian and Alaskan Native: 0.9%
- Pacific Islander: 0.5% (0.1% Native Hawaiian, 0.1% Guamanian or Chamorro, 0.1% Samoan)
- Two or more races: 4.1%
- Some other race: 4.9%

In 2010 the median income for a household in the MSA was $53,078 and the median income for a family was $64,290. The per capita income was $27,451.

The Portland–Vancouver–Hillsboro Metropolitan Statistical Area (MSA), the 23rd largest in the United States, has a population of 2,226,009 (2010 Census). Of them, 1,789,580 live in Oregon (46.7% of the state's population) while the remaining 436,429 live in Washington (6.7% of state's population). It consists of Multnomah, Washington, Clackamas, Columbia and Yamhill counties in Oregon, as well as Clark and Skamania counties in Washington. The area includes Portland and the neighboring cities of Vancouver, Beaverton, Gresham, Hillsboro, Milwaukie, Lake Oswego, Oregon City, Fairview, Wood Village, Troutdale, Tualatin, Tigard, West Linn, Battle Ground, Camas and Washougal.

Changes in house prices for the metro area are publicly tracked on a regular basis using the Case–Shiller index; the statistic is published by Standard & Poor's and is also a component of S&P's 20-city composite index of the value of the U.S. residential real estate market.

County	2025 Estimate	2020 Census	Change	Area	Density
Multnomah County, Oregon	795,391	815,428	−2.46%	431.30 sq mi (1,117.1 km^{2})	1,844/sq mi (712/km^{2})
Washington County, Oregon	611,708	600,372	+1.89%	724.23 sq mi (1,875.7 km^{2})	845/sq mi (326/km^{2})
Clark County, Washington	532,119	503,311	+5.72%	629.00 sq mi (1,629.1 km^{2})	846/sq mi (327/km^{2})
Clackamas County, Oregon	426,280	421,401	+1.16%	1,870.32 sq mi (4,844.1 km^{2})	228/sq mi (88/km^{2})
Yamhill County, Oregon	110,024	107,722	+2.14%	715.86 sq mi (1,854.1 km^{2})	154/sq mi (59/km^{2})
Columbia County, Oregon	54,091	52,589	+2.86%	657.36 sq mi (1,702.6 km^{2})	82/sq mi (32/km^{2})
Skamania County, Washington	12,669	12,036	+5.26%	1,655.68 sq mi (4,288.2 km^{2})	8/sq mi (3/km^{2})
Total	2,542,282	2,512,859	+1.17%	6,683.75 sq mi (17,310.8 km^{2})	380/sq mi (147/km^{2})

== Portland–Vancouver–Salem Combined Statistical Area ==
As of July 2022, the Portland–Vancouver–Salem, OR–WA Combined Statistical Area (CSA) consists of five Metropolitan Statistical Areas, covering nine counties in Oregon and three counties in Washington.

Statistical Area	2025 estimate	2020 Census	Change	Area	Density
Portland–Vancouver–Hillsboro, OR-WA Metropolitan Statistical Area	2,542,282	2,512,859	+1.17%	6,684 sq mi (17,310 km^{2})	380/sq mi (147/km^{2})
Salem, OR Metropolitan Statistical Area	445,814	433,353	+2.88%	4,978 sq mi (12,890 km^{2})	90/sq mi (35/km^{2})
Albany, OR Metropolitan Statistical Area	132,843	128,610	+3.29%	2,309 sq mi (5,980 km^{2})	58/sq mi (22/km^{2})
Longview–Kelso, WA Metropolitan Statistical Area	114,885	110,730	+3.75%	1,166 sq mi (3,020 km^{2})	99/sq mi (38/km^{2})
Corvallis, OR Metropolitan Statistical Area	97,728	95,184	+2.67%	679 sq mi (1,760 km^{2})	144/sq mi (56/km^{2})
Total	3,333,552	3,280,736	+1.61%	15,816 sq mi (40,960 km^{2})	211/sq mi (81/km^{2})

== Cities and other communities ==
Major cities in the region in addition to Portland include Beaverton, Gresham, Hillsboro in Oregon, and Vancouver in Washington. The area also includes the smaller cities of Barlow, Banks, Canby, Clatskanie, Cornelius, Durham, Estacada, Fairview, Forest Grove, Gladstone, Happy Valley, Johnson City, King City, Lake Oswego, Milwaukie, Molalla, Oregon City, Rainier, Rivergrove, Sandy, Sherwood, North Plains, Tigard, Troutdale, Tualatin, West Linn, Wilsonville, Wood Village in Oregon, as well as Battle Ground, Camas, La Center, North Bonneville, Ridgefield, Stevenson and Washougal in Washington.

View from Oregon City with West Linn and with downtown Portland in the background.

It includes the unincorporated suburban communities in Oregon of Aloha, Beavercreek, Boring, Cedar Mill, Clackamas, Damascus, Dunthorpe, Garden Home, Raleigh Hills, and West Slope, as well as Hazel Dell, Minnehaha, Salmon Creek, Walnut Grove and Orchards in Washington.

Major

- Portland
- Vancouver
- Hillsboro
- Gresham
- Beaverton

Other

- Amity
- Battle Ground
- Banks
- Barlow
- Camas
- Canby
- Carlton
- Clatskanie
- Columbia City
- Cornelius
- Dayton
- Dundee
- Durham
- Estacada
- Fairview
- Forest Grove
- Gaston
- Gladstone
- Happy Valley
- Johnson City
- King City
- La Center
- Lafayette
- Lake Oswego
- Maywood Park
- McMinnville
- Milwaukie
- Molalla
- Newberg
- North Bonneville
- North Plains
- Oregon City
- Prescott
- Rainier
- Ridgefield
- Rivergrove
- St. Helens
- Sandy
- Scappoose
- Sheridan
- Sherwood
- Stevenson
- Tigard
- Troutdale
- Tualatin
- Vernonia
- Washougal
- West Linn
- Willamina
- Wilsonville
- Wood Village
- Woodland
- Yacolt
- Yamhill

== Transportation ==
Portland is where Interstate 84 starts at Interstate 5, both major highways in the Pacific Northwest. Other primary roads include Interstate 205, an eastern bypass of the urban core, U.S. Route 26, which heads west and southeast, U.S. Route 30, which follows the Oregon side of the Columbia River northwest and east, mirrored by Washington State Route 14 east from Vancouver, and Oregon Route 217, which connects US 26 with I-5 in the south, travelling through Beaverton. Both US 26 and US 30 go to the Oregon Coast. SR 500 runs from Interstate 5 to SR 503. Padden Parkway runs from NE 78th St and east to NE 162nd Ave.

Transit service on the Oregon side is generally provided by TriMet. In addition, Sandy Area Metro serves Sandy, South Clackamas Transportation District serves nearby Molalla, Canby Area Transit serves Canby and South Metro Area Regional Transit serves Wilsonville. Service in Clark County is provided by C-Tran. In Columbia County, the Columbia County Rider provides transit service on weekdays connecting St. Helens with downtown Portland and connecting Scappoose and St. Helens with certain points in urban Washington County, including the PCC Rock Creek campus, Tanasbourne and the Willow Creek MAX light rail station.

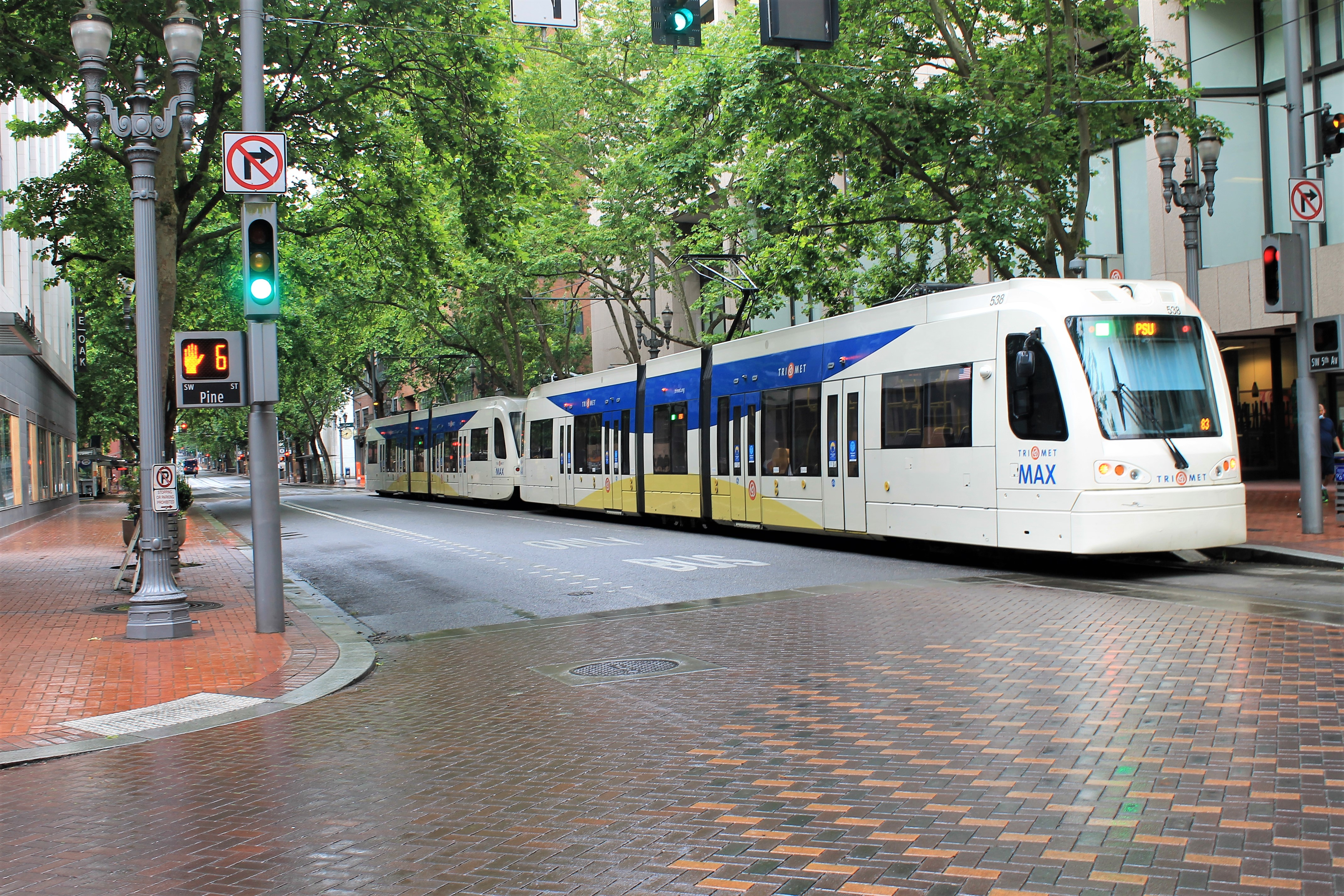
MAX light rail in Downtown Portland

=== Major airports ===
- Portland International Airport
- Portland-Hillsboro Airport
- Aurora State Airport
- Salem Municipal Airport
- Portland-Troutdale Airport

=== Passenger rail ===
Several daily Amtrak trains serve Portland Union Station as well as suburban stops in Oregon City and Vancouver. The Coast Starlight runs from Los Angeles to Seattle while Cascades connects Eugene to Vancouver, BC. The Empire Builder heads east to Chicago.

=== Major highways ===
State highways, numbered as Interstate, U.S. and Oregon Routes, in the metropolitan area include:

- Interstate 5
- Interstate 84
- Interstate 205
- Interstate 405
- U.S. Route 26
- U.S. Route 30
  - U.S. Route 30 Business
- OR 8
- OR 18
- OR 10
- OR 43
- OR 99E
- OR 99W
- OR 210
- OR 212
- OR 213
- OR 217
- OR 219
- OR 224
- State Route 14
- State Route 500
- State Route 503

Notable highways never built, or removed altogether, include Mount Hood Freeway, Interstate 505, and Harbor Drive.

== Sports ==
The Portland MSA is home to a number of professional and semi-professional sports teams, including the NBA's Portland Trail Blazers, the Portland Timbers of Major League Soccer, the Portland Thorns FC of the National Women's Soccer League, and the Portland Fire of the WNBA, Other teams include the Portland Pickles and the Hillsboro Hops. Portland is also home to two NCAA Division 1 universities, the Portland State Vikings and the Portland Pilots.

The Portland MSA also hosts a number of amateur sports, including college and high school sports. The high school rugby championships are held annually in the Portland MSA, and draw crowds of 8,000 to 10,000 supporters.

== Politics ==
Presidential election results
Year	DEM	GOP	Others
2024	62.7% 834,779	33.4% 444,458	3.9% 52,269
2020	63.6% 900,757	33.1% 469,466	3.2% 45,300
2016	57.8% 672,364	31.9% 371,379	10.3% 119,802
2012	60.0% 632,945	36.6% 386,323	3.3% 34,862
2008	62.6% 657,076	34.9% 366,490	2.5% 26,202
2004	57.0% 587,901	41.7% 430,401	1.3% 13,357
2000	53.0% 443,629	41.3% 345,293	5.7% 47,440
1996	51.4% 380,537	35.6% 264,044	13.0% 96,411
1992	45.7% 357,117	30.5% 238,124	23.9% 186,437
1988	54.7% 343,172	43.4% 272,346	1.8% 11,547
1984	46.5% 290,504	52.9% 330,464	0.5% 3,228
1980	41.5% 246,639	44.8% 266,198	13.7% 81,212
1976	47.8% 255,813	48.0% 256,598	4.2% 22,531
1972	45.6% 226,237	50.1% 249,015	4.2% 21,040
1968	48.1% 211,351	46.7% 205,269	5.2% 22,887
1964	65.2% 273,608	34.5% 144,745	0.4% 1,545
1960	48.0% 198,802	51.9% 214,980	0.1% 511

The Portland metropolitan area is heavily Democratic and has voted for that party's presidential candidate in every election since 1988. This is helped by Multnomah County, which has given the Democratic nominee over 70% of the vote in every election since 2004.
