= Oregon Route 141 =

State highway in Washington County, Oregon, US

Oregon Route 141
- Beaverton–Tualatin Highway No. 141
- Route 141 highlighted in red

Route information
- Maintained by ODOT
- Length: 10.63 mi (17.11 km)
- Existed: 2003–present

Major junctions
- South end: I-5 in Wilsonville
- OR 99W in Tigard
- North end: OR 210 in Progress

Location
- Country: United States
- State: Oregon
- County: Washington

Highway system
- Oregon Highways; Interstate; US; State; Named; Scenic
← OR 140	→ OR 153

Oregon Route 141, known as the Beaverton–Tualatin Highway No. 141 (see Oregon highways and routes), is an Oregon state highway which runs (contrary to its name) from the city of Wilsonville to the southern edge of Beaverton. The highway is 10.46 miles (16.83 km) long.

Oregon Route 141 is a post-2002 number, and currently does not have any route markers posted.

== Route description ==
The southern terminus of Oregon Route 141 is at Exit 286 on Interstate 5 in northern Wilsonville. From there, the highway runs north along Boones Ferry Road, through the city of Tualatin and past the community of Durham. In Durham, it then turns west on Durham Road for approximately one mile, then turns north again Hall Boulevard in Tigard. It then heads north on Hall for several miles, crossing OR 99W in Tigard, and eventually ending at an intersection with OR 210 (Scholls Ferry Road) in the community of Progress (though the intersection is technically within the city of Beaverton). An interchange with OR 217 lies nearby.

Just north of the intersection with OR 99W, the highway crosses over, but does not intersect with, OR 217; however access to OR 217 at this point is provided via OR 99W.

This route, along with a further extension north into Beaverton on Hall Boulevard, and a further extension south into Woodburn via Boones Ferry Road, was the original route of OR 217, before the current freeway alignment was constructed in 1972.

As of 2006, route markers are not posted for this highway anywhere along its length. Complicating the definition of the highway, two separate sections of the route are maintained by cities (Tualatin and Tigard), and are technically not part of the official definition of OR 141.

== History ==
Prior to the opening of the current OR 217 freeway in the 1970s, the entire route of OR 141 was part of the original OR 217 that connected OR 8 in Beaverton to US 99E in Aurora.

== Major intersections ==
County	Location	mi	km	Destinations	Notes
Clackamas–Washington county line	Wilsonville	10.63– 10.00	17.11– 16.09	I-5 – Portland, Salem	
Washington	Wilsonville	9.86	15.87	End state maintenance	
Washington	Gap in route				
Washington	Tualatin	6.30	10.14	Begin state maintenance	
Washington	Tigard	5.12	8.24	End state maintenance	
Washington	Tigard	Gap in route			
Washington	Tigard	4.50	7.24	Begin state maintenance	
Washington	Tigard	2.40	3.86	OR 99W (Pacific Highway W) – Sherwood, Newberg, Portland, Salem	
Washington	Beaverton	0.27	0.43	OR 210 (Scholls Ferry Road) to OR 217	
Washington	Beaverton	0.14	0.23	OR 217 south – Tigard, Salem	No access to or from northbound OR 217
Washington	Beaverton	0.00	0.00	End state maintenance	
1.000 mi = 1.609 km; 1.000 km = 0.621 mi: Incomplete access
