= Lincoln Center (Oregon) =

Lincoln Tower
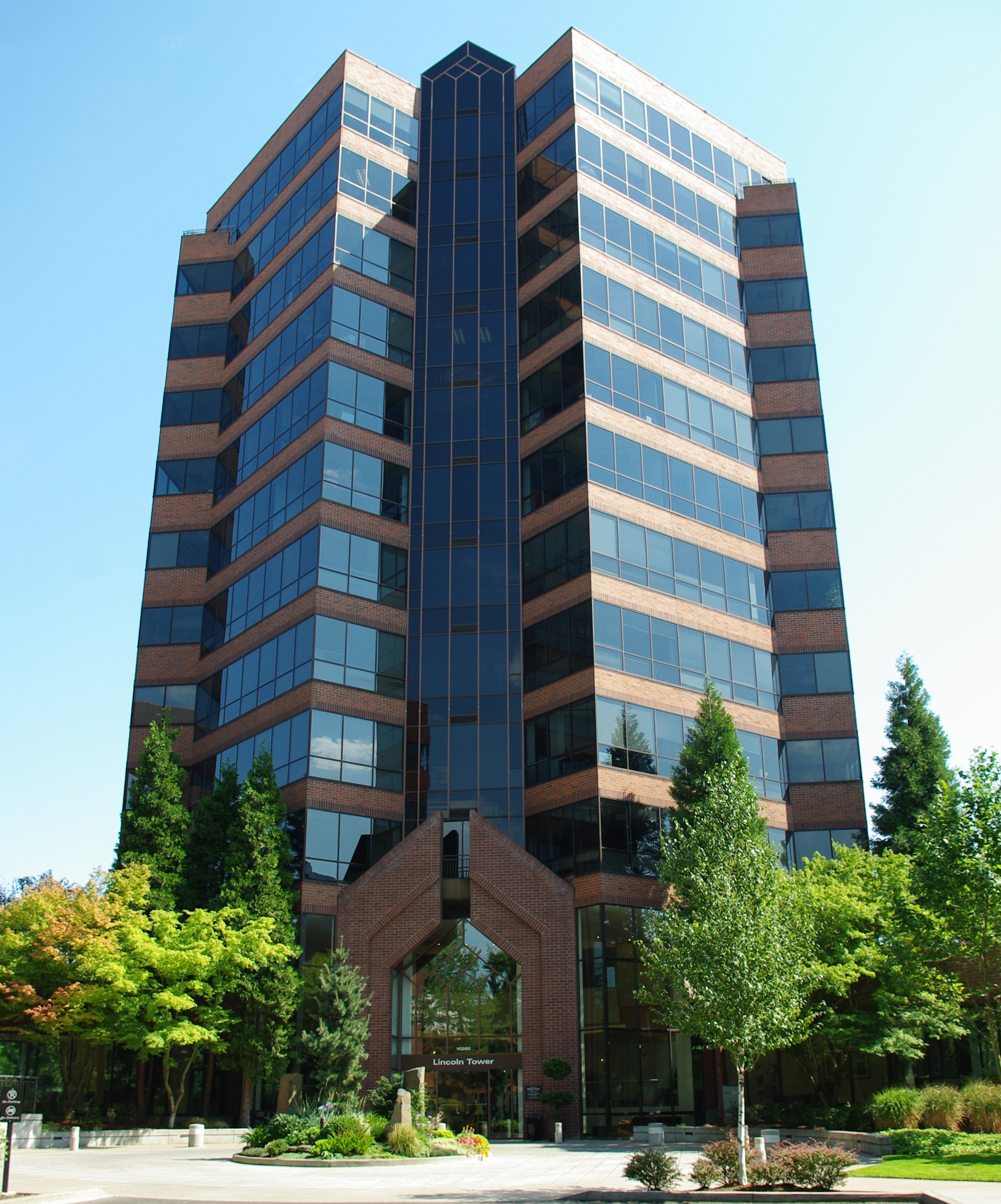
- Lincoln Center Tower
- Interactive map of the Lincoln Tower area

General information
- Type: Office
- Location: Tigard, Oregon, United States
- Coordinates: 45°26′43″N 122°46′26″W
- Construction started: 1987
- Completed: 1988
- Opening: 1988
- Cost: $14 million
- Owner: Shorenstein Properties

Height
- Roof: 154 feet (47 m)

Technical details
- Floor count: 12
- Floor area: 220,000 square feet (20,000 m^{2})

Design and construction
- Developer: Trammell Crow Company
- Structural engineer: T.M. Rippey Consulting Engineers

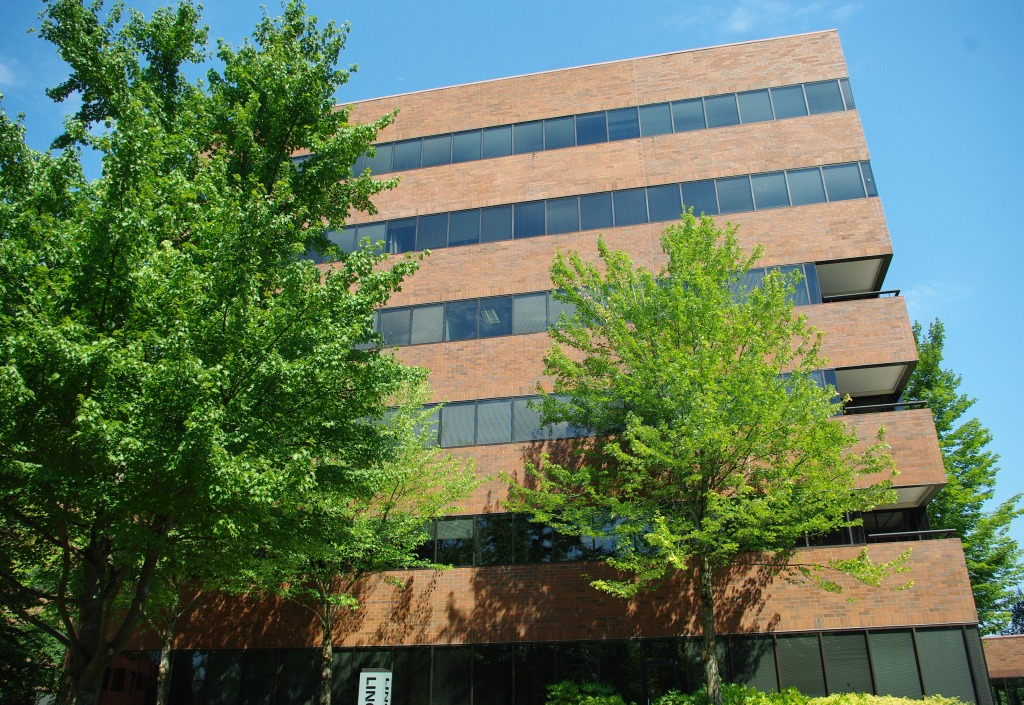
2 Lincoln Center

Lincoln Center is a multi-building office complex in Tigard, Oregon, United States. Opened in 1981, the six-building complex was built over a decade and includes the 12-story Lincoln Tower, the tallest building in Washington County. Located on S.W. Greenburg Road at Oregon Route 217, Lincoln Center is adjacent to the Washington Square shopping mall in the Portland metropolitan area.

== History ==
Developed by the Trammell Crow Company beginning in 1980, the first building at Lincoln Center was completed in 1981. Additional buildings were completed in 1985, 1988, and 1989. The complex was annexed by Tigard in 1986 after a state commission decided in their favor over Beaverton and Portland. In 1990, Trammell Crow sold the property to the Japanese firm Seiyu International Corporation, headed by Yashimitsu Misawa, for $120 million.

Misawa was assisted in the transaction by state representative and former Tigard mayor Tom Brian, who received a $2 million commission for the sale. Brian faced formal ethics violations for his role and for accepting campaign contributions from the company and Misawa by the state, as well as charges by the Oregon Real Estate Agency for operating without a license, and a lawsuit by Misawa for an inflated sale price. He settled the lawsuit with Misawa and repaid part of the $2 million commission while Misawa was later arrested in Japan for various fraud charges concerning this and other real estate transactions. The ethics charges against Brian were later dismissed.

In December 1991, Seiyu Corporation sold the complex to Sanyo Finance Company Ltd. for $102.7 million. Geese made news in 1991 and 1992 after nesting on the balcony of one of the towers. In 1995, SF Oregon Company (a subsidiary of Sanyo Finance Co. Ltd.) put the property up for sale with a listed price of $100 million. In 1996, Knickerbocker Properties (owned by the New York State Teachers Retirement System) purchased Lincoln Center for $89.4 million.

Knickerbocker placed the complex on sale in 2000, with Spieker Properties Inc. buying the center for $118 million in July 2000. Spieker was acquired by EQ Office in March 2001. The building was used in an earthquake response drill by county groups in April 2003. EQ Office sold Lincoln Center in 2007 to Shorenstein Properties.

== Details ==
Completed in 1981, 1 Lincoln Center is five stories tall. 2 Lincoln Center and 3 Lincoln Center are six stories tall and were built in 1985. The newest building, 5 Lincoln Center, was finished in 1989 and is seven stories tall. Located in the Portland metropolitan area, the complex is in the city of Tigard, but uses a Portland mailing address. Lincoln Center is at S.W. Greenburg Road and Oregon Route 217 across from the Washington Square shopping mall. The six-building complex sits on 23 acres (0.093 km^{2}) acres and contains 743,000 square feet (69,000 m^{2}) of leasable space, primarily office space with some retail space as well. The grounds of the center include a duck pond. Exteriors of the office buildings are faced with steel and red bricks. In addition to office buildings, the center includes parking garages.

=== Lincoln Tower ===
Finished in 1988, Lincoln Tower or Lincoln Center Tower stands 12 stories tall. Built at a cost of $14 million, it measures 154 feet (47 m) in height. The skyscraper was built on 6.8 acres (0.028 km^{2}) and was the tallest building in (until Nike built The Serena Williams Building at Nike World HQ) Washington County. As the second tallest, Tualatin Valley Fire & Rescue use the building for training in fighting fires in high-rise buildings. Lincoln Tower includes a helicopter landing pad on the roof of the 220,000 square feet (20,000 m^{2}) building.
