= Lincoln Tower =

Lincoln Tower may refer to:

- Lincoln Tower, a skyscraper at Lincoln Center in Oregon, United States
- Lincoln Bank Tower, an Art-Deco skyscraper in Indiana, United States
- Lincoln Memorial Tower, a nineteenth-century building in London, United Kingdom
- The Towers (Ohio State), a dormitory at Ohio State University known as Lincoln Tower
