= Oregon Route 219 =

State highway in northwestern Oregon, US

Oregon Route 219
- Route 219 highlighted in red

Route information
- Maintained by ODOT
- Length: 36.47 mi (58.69 km)
- Existed: 1935–present

Major junctions
- South end: I-5 / OR 214 in Woodburn
- OR 99W / OR 18 in Newberg; OR 210 in Scholls; OR 10 near Farmington
- North end: OR 8 in Hillsboro

Location
- Country: United States
- State: Oregon
- Counties: Marion, Washington, Yamhill

Highway system
- Oregon Highways; Interstate; US; State; Named; Scenic
← OR 218	→ OR 221

Oregon Route 219 (also known as part of the Hillsboro-Silverton Highway No. 140 (see Oregon highways and routes)) is an Oregon state highway which runs between the cities of Hillsboro and Woodburn, Oregon, in the United States. The Hillsboro-Silverton Highway continues further south to Silverton, signed as OR 214. The highway mainly serves local residents and agricultural traffic, despite its proximity to the Portland area it lies outside the Portland Urban Growth Boundary (except for its northern terminus in Hillsboro), and maintains its character as a country road.

== Route description ==
OR 219's southern terminus is at the junction with Interstate 5 and OR 214 in the city of Woodburn. (A single diamond interchange serves both OR 219 and OR 214 from the freeway; OR 219 leads west of the interchange and OR 214 heads east.) After passing a collection of shopping malls and motel chains around the Woodburn exit, OR 219 starts winding its way through the Marion County countryside, heading in a northwesterly direction. As the area is primarily regular-platted farmland, the alignment of OR 219 heads west for a while, then turns north, then turns west again; the route contains numerous 90-degree turns.

The next city encountered is the city of St. Paul. From St. Paul, the highway heads north and then northeast, parallel to (but at some distance from) the Willamette River. At this point the road is known as the St. Paul Highway. After the intersections with McKay Road and Champeog Road (which provides access to Champoeg State Heritage Area), the route crosses the Willamette River. Soon after crossing the river, the highway enters the city of Newberg.

In Newberg, the route intersects OR 18 (the Newberg-Dundee Bypass) before it joins (and overlaps) OR 99W along the Pacific Highway West No. 1W, and the combined route then heads westward into the city center (when one travels on the concurrent section, one is simultaneously heading north on OR 219 and south on OR 99W, or vice versa). In downtown Newberg, the route enters a one-way couplet; and then OR 219 splits apart from OR 99W again, and heads north.

Immediately north of Newberg, the route enters a steep, narrow, twisty section as it climbs out of the Willamette Valley into the hills overlooking the town. Soon, the road levels out again as OR 219 descends into the Tualatin Valley. The next named location is Scholls, where the route intersects with OR 210. Keeping on OR 219, one then heads in a general northwesterly direction, running parallel to the western bank of the Tualatin River. Just northwest of the intersection with OR 210 is Brown's Corner, followed by the 90 degree turn at the Midway Curve. The state plans to re-work those curves to improve safety.

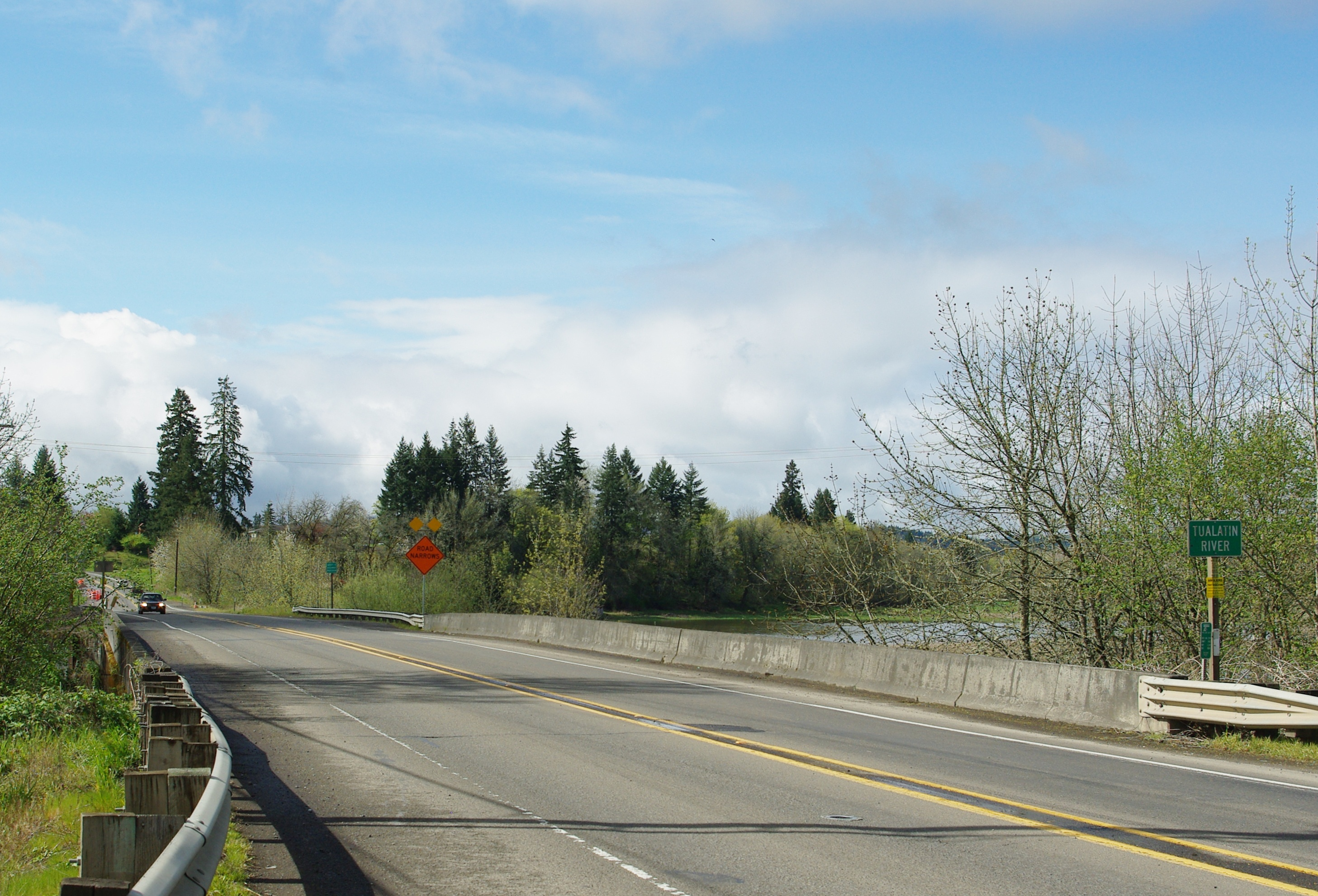
The highway as it enters Hillsboro across the Tualatin River

After OR 210, the next major route encountered is OR 10, just west of Farmington. About five miles (8 km) after that, OR 219 enters the city of Hillsboro as it crosses the Tualatin River and passes by Jackson Bottom Wetlands Preserve. Entering downtown Hillsboro, OR 219 becomes South 1st Street before ending at the intersection with Oregon Route 8, the Tualatin Valley Highway. Mile marker numbering begins here as zero, with numbers increasing as the road stretches to the south.

OR 18 (the Newberg-Dundee Bypass) intersected Oregon Route 219 south of Newberg when it opened in winter 2018.

== History ==
In 1989, Washington County renamed the road in the county from Oregon 219 to Hillsboro Highway. This was part of an effort to improve response times by emergency services.

OR 219 originally continued south from Woodburn on French Prairie Road and River Road to Salem, Oregon. Its original southern terminus was at OR 22 and OR 99E in downtown Salem and was later moved north to near Keizer following the completion of the Salem Parkway. The highway was truncated to Woodburn in August 1992 and absorbed a section of OR 214 to connect with I-5.

== Major intersections ==
Note: mileposts do not reflect actual mileage due to realignments.

County	Location	mi	km	Destinations	Notes
Marion	Woodburn	36.81	59.24	I-5 / OR 214 east – Salem, Woodburn	Interchange
Marion		32.96	53.04	French Prairie Road–Salem	Former OR 219 south
Yamhill	Newberg	20.73	33.36	OR 99W north – Portland	South end of OR 99W overlap
Yamhill	Newberg	20.15	32.43	OR 99W south – McMinnville	North end of OR 99W overlap
Washington	Scholls	10.05	16.17	OR 210 – Progress, Portland	
Washington		5.45	8.77	OR 10 – Farmington, Beaverton	
Washington	Hillsboro	0.00	0.00	OR 8 – Cornelius, Forest Grove, Beaverton, Portland, Hillsboro City Center, North Plains	
1.000 mi = 1.609 km; 1.000 km = 0.621 mi: Concurrency terminus
