= Oregon Route 10 =

State highway in northwestern Oregon, US

Oregon Route 10
- Route 10 highlighted in red

Route information
- Maintained by ODOT
- Length: 18.55 mi (29.85 km)
- Existed: 1932–present

Major junctions
- West end: OR 219 near Farmington
- OR 217 in Beaverton; OR 210 in Raleigh Hills; US 26 in Portland; I-405 in Portland
- East end: US 26 in Portland

Location
- Country: United States
- State: Oregon

Highway system
- Oregon Highways; Interstate; US; State; Named; Scenic
← OR 8	→ OR 11

Oregon Route 10 is an Oregon state highway which serves Portland and some of its western suburbs.

== Route description ==
OR 10 begins as Naito Parkway in Downtown Portland starting where Naito Parkway interchanges with U.S. Route 26. It heads south out of downtown, multiplexed with Oregon Route 99W. After passing under the Portland Aerial Tram, Naito Parkway ends at an interchange with Barbur Boulevard; the two routes continue south out of Portland on Barbur. OR 10 separates from OR 99W a few miles south of downtown, and proceeds along Capitol Highway through the Portland neighborhood of Hillsdale. Along here, it is a surface street, which cuts through the southern part of Portland's West Hills. It separates from Capitol Highway in Hillsdale, which continues unnumbered. The highway continues west into Washington County, where it becomes Beaverton-Hillsdale Highway No. 40.

In the community of Raleigh Hills, OR 10 intersects with Oregon Route 210 (locally known as Scholls Ferry Road), which heads southwest towards Progress, Tigard, and Scholls. OR 10 continues west into Beaverton, where it interchanges with Oregon Route 217, a freeway, and stops being Beaverton-Hillsdale Highway No. 40. West of that interchange, the street name changes to Farmington Road, the eastern part of which is not a state highway, and comes a block parallel with Oregon Route 8 in front of Beaverton High School. The portion of OR 10 from downtown Beaverton to the intersection with Oregon Route 219 was once known as Oregon Route 208. OR 8 and 10 no longer intersect, but it is not uncommon for commuters to use the frontage road for the OR 217 interchange or another surface street to change between the routes. As Farmington Road, OR 10 leaves Beaverton and cuts across half-developed suburbia to Farmington and its intersection with OR 219. This final section comprises Farmington Highway No. 142, which extends for 1.5 miles east from SW 197th Avenue.

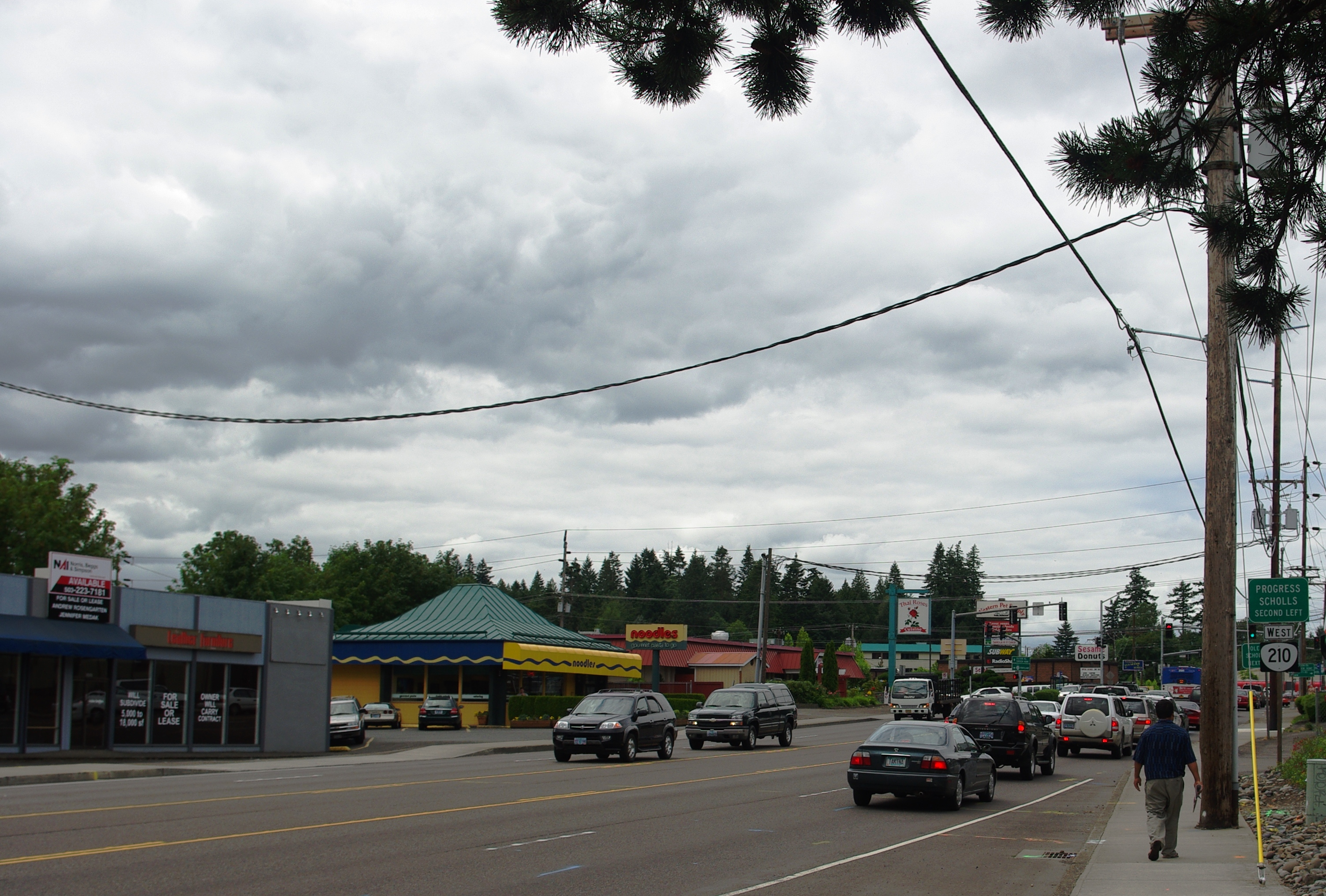
Highway in Raleigh Hills

== History ==
The oldest section of Oregon Route 10 was Farmington Road. Established circa 1848 as part of a larger route from Lafayette, Oregon to Portland, Oregon, known as the Portland-Yamhill Falls Road. This section followed from the Harris Ferry in Farmington, Oregon, to Canyon Road in Beaverton, Oregon. The specific route of the road would later become lost, and it would then be reestablished in its modern routing in 1898. In 1932, Farmington Road became part of Oregon's highway system, and was designated Oregon Route 208.

Initially, Farmington Road was referred under several names, such as the Harris Bridge Road, the Farmington and Portland Road, and the Portland-Lafayette Road, all interchangeably. The road would end up being referred to as the Campbell Bridge-Beaverton Road by the Oregon State Highway Department in 1928, and when it became a secondary highway in 1936, It was referred to as Farmington highway, with the constituent road being referred to as Farmington Road.

Circa 1916-1918, the Beaverton-Hillsdale Highway would be established as the Bertha-Beaverton Road. The road ran from Broadway Road in Beaverton to Capitol Highway. In 1920, it would become a part of Oregon's highway system and in 1937, the highway was officially renamed to the Beaverton-Hillsdale Highway.

Starting in the early 1980s, plans were made to connect Farmington Road and the Beaverton-Hillsdale Highway, and merge them into a single continuous road. Construction would commence circa 1990-1991, and complete before July 16, 1992.

== Major intersections ==
Milepoints are as reported by ODOT and do not necessarily reflect current mileage. Z indicates overlapping mileage due to construction longer than established route, and – indicates negative mileage behind established beginning point. Segments that are locally maintained may be omitted. For routes traversing multiple named state highways, each milepoint is preceded by the corresponding state highway number.

County	Location	Milepoint	Destinations	Notes
Washington		142 -0.06	OR 219 – Hillsboro, Scholls, Newberg	
Washington	Beaverton		Watson Avenue	Former OR 208 east/OR 217 south
Washington	Beaverton	40 1.01	OR 217 / to Sunset Highway (US 26) – Cedar Hills, Tigard, Salem	
Washington	Raleigh Hills	40 3.13	OR 210 (Scholls Ferry Road) / Oleson Road – Progress, Scholls, Sylvan, Garden Home	
Multnomah	Portland		To I-5 / OR 99W south / Bertha Boulevard	
Multnomah	Portland		Capitol Highway	
Multnomah	Portland	1W 3.19	Barbur Boulevard (Pacific Highway West south)	End of OR 99W concurrency westbound; OR 99W continues while OR 10 exits on the right; westbound exit and eastbound entrance
Multnomah	Portland	1W 1.97	Barbur Boulevard – Portland City Center	Beginning of OR 99W concurrency eastbound; OR 10 merges onto Pacific Highway West north from the right
Multnomah	Portland	1W 1.67	US 26 east (Ross Island Bridge)	Interchange; eastbound exit and westbound entrance
Multnomah	Portland	1W 1.67	Naito Parkway (Pacific Highway West north)	End of OR 99W concurrency eastbound; end of OR 10; continuation beyond US 26
1.000 mi = 1.609 km; 1.000 km = 0.621 mi: Concurrency terminus; Incomplete access
