= Oregon Route 210 =

State highway in Washington County, Oregon, US

Oregon Route 210
- Scholls Ferry Road
- Route 210 highlighted in red

Route information
- Maintained by ODOT
- Length: 12.1 mi (19.5 km)

Major junctions
- West end: OR 219 near Scholls
- OR 217 in Beaverton
- East end: OR 10 in Beaverton

Location
- Country: United States
- State: Oregon
- County: Washington

Highway system
- Oregon Highways; Interstate; US; State; Named; Scenic
← OR 207	→ OR 211

Oregon Route 210 (also known as Scholls Ferry Road, or, more formally, the Scholls Highway No. 143 (see Oregon highways and routes)) is a state highway which runs between the community of Scholls, Oregon and the Raleigh Hills neighborhood west of Portland, terminating at the Sylvan overpass on Highway 26. It has become an important route for both commuters and agriculture through Washington County. Oregon Route 210 is signed from east-to-west; though in actuality it runs in a northeast-to-southwest direction.

The neighborhoods located along Route 210 are generally affluent, being higher in rent than 83.1% of the neighborhoods in Oregon.

== Route description ==
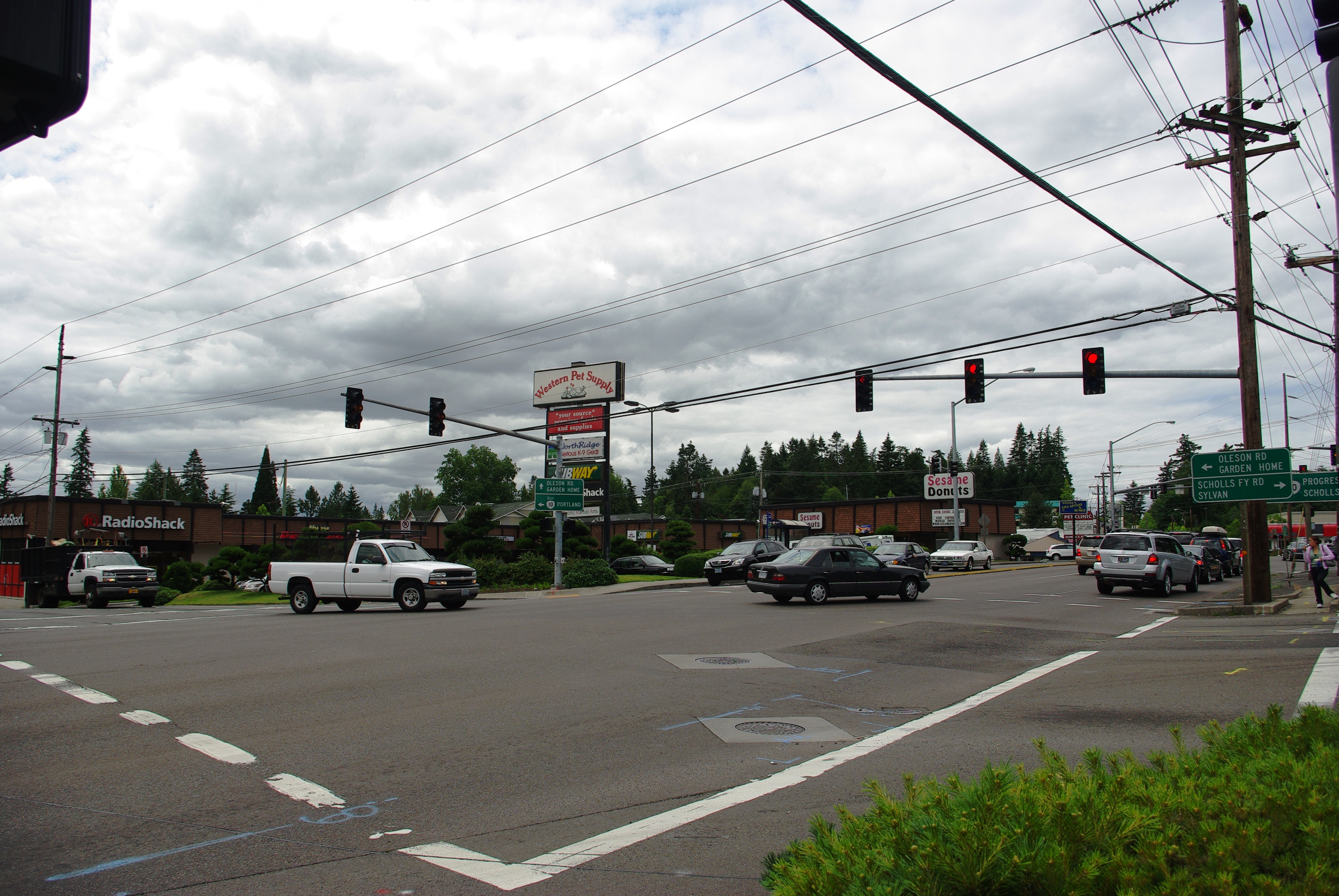
Highway at Oregon Route 10 in Raleigh Hills.

Oregon Route 210's western terminus is at the junction with Oregon Route 219 in the town of Scholls. The highway leaves Scholls headed due north-northeast (on a 2-lane, unlimited-access alignment), crossing the Tualatin River over a bridge which replaced the Scholls Ferry (for which the road is still named). Soon after, there is a roundabout with River Road; with Oregon Route 210 heading east, and River Road heading towards Hillsboro to the west. Continuing east, the road winds through farmland (as well as a few wineries) in the fertile Tualatin Valley for several miles until the town of Kinton, and then toward its intersection with Roy Rogers Road.

Near the intersection with Roy Rogers Road (named for a Washington County official, not for the famous cowboy) which heads south towards Sherwood, Oregon Route 210 enters Portland's Urban Growth Boundary, and the farms and wineries are suddenly replaced with townhouses and subdivisions, and OR 210 transforms instantly into a suburban thoroughfare. A short distance further east, the highway passes on the edge of the Murrayhill neighborhood of Beaverton and becomes a four-lane divided expressway. At this point, Oregon Route 210 becomes the boundary between Beaverton and the city of Tigard, with Beaverton to the north and Tigard to the south.

The highway continues east for several more miles until its intersection with Oregon Route 217, a freeway serving Portland's southwestern suburbs. This intersection is frequently congested, as most traffic leaves OR 210 to get on OR 217 (generally heading north towards downtown Beaverton and Portland). Also nearby is the community of Progress and the Washington Square shopping mall, as well as Hall Boulevard, a major thoroughfare through Beaverton and Tigard.

North of Hall Boulevard, the road once again becomes a two-lane route as it passes through several neighborhoods in unincorporated Washington County. It heads in a north-northeasterly direction until it reaches the Raleigh Hills neighborhood, where Oregon Route 210 ends at an intersection with Oregon Route 10, the Beaverton-Hillsdale Highway. Scholls Ferry Road continues in a northeasterly direction for several more miles until it intersects with Oregon Route 8 and U.S. Route 26 in the Sylvan neighborhood. This stretch used to be signed as Oregon Route 210 as well; but that designation was removed some years ago.

There are two other notable alignment changes over the years. In the segment between Raleigh Hills and Progress one can find a residential street called "Old Scholls Ferry Road"; this was an older alignment of the highway. South of the Murrayhill neighborhood is a street called Barrows Road; this also was an old alignment of OR 210 before the new alignment through Murrayhill was constructed in the late 80s or early 90s. (For a while after the new roadway was built, Barrows Road continued to be signed as 210; however it no longer carries this designation). The current alignment, which goes over a hill, was actually the original alignment of the highway; sometime before 1960 the highway was rerouted to a longer but more level route along what is now called Barrows Road. At that time the "new" level route became Scholls Ferry Road, signed as OR 210, and the original route was renamed Old Scholls Ferry Road. In the 1990s Old Scholls Ferry Road regained its designation as OR 210 and the Barrows Road name was applied to the former route.

== Major intersections ==
The entire route is in Washington County.

Location	mi	km	Destinations	Notes
	0.0	0.0	OR 219 – Chehalem Mountains, Newberg, Laurel, Hillsboro	
Beaverton	9.2	14.8	OR 217 to US 26 (Sunset Highway) – Beaverton, Tigard, Salem	Interchange
Beaverton	9.6	15.4	OR 141 (Hall Boulevard)	
Raleigh Hills	12.1	19.5	OR 10; Scholls Ferry Road north	No left turns from OR 210; Scholls Ferry Road continues north to US 26
1.000 mi = 1.609 km; 1.000 km = 0.621 mi: Incomplete access
