= Washington Square (Oregon) =

Shopping mall in Tigard, Oregon, United States

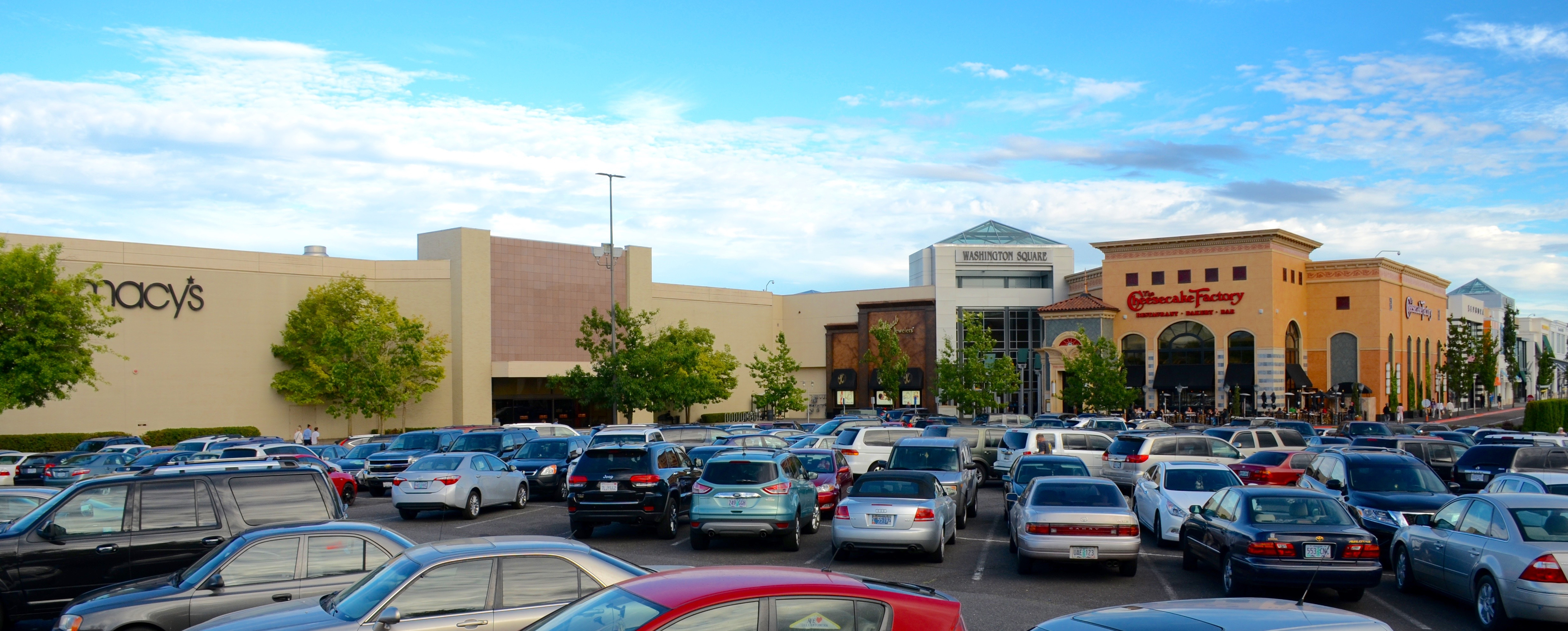
- Exterior of the mall's northwest corner
- Location: Tigard, Oregon; 45.450618°N 122.7811°W
- Opened: 1973; 53 years ago
- Developer: Winmar Pacific, Inc.
- Manager: The Macerich Company
- Owner: The Macerich Company & OTPP
- Num. of stores: 210
- Num. of anchor tenants: 5 (4 open, 1 under construction)
- Floor area: 1,458,734 sq ft (135,520 m^{2}) (GLA)
- Floors: 2 (closed 3rd floor mezzanine in H&M)
- Parking: 6,700
- Public transit: 45, 56, 62, 76, 78 at Washington Square Transit Center
- Website: www.shopwashingtonsquare.com

Washington Square is a shopping mall in the city of Tigard, Oregon, United States. Located in the Portland metropolitan area along Oregon Route 217, the shopping complex is one of the top grossing malls per square foot in the United States, with sales of $716/ft^{2}. Opened in 1973, the mall is currently managed and co-owned by The Macerich Company, a real estate investment trust, and is anchored by Macy's, Nordstrom, JCPenney, Apple Store, and Dick's Sporting Goods.

== History ==
On May 3, 1972, plans for Oregon's largest shopping mall at that time were announced by Winmar Pacific, Inc., a developer bought by Safeco in 1967. It was to be a 130-acre (0.53 km^{2}) development with space for 100 stores. The mall was to include over 1,000,000 square feet (93,000 m^{2}) on 85 acres (340,000 m^{2}) in an L-shaped pattern. On August 16, 1973, Meier & Frank became the first tenant to open at the mall. Sears and Lipman's then opened that November, followed by Liberty House and Nordstrom during the summer of 1974. The grand opening of the facility began on February 21, 1974. It is located southwest of Portland in an area known as Progress, which at the time was entirely unincorporated and located between the cities of Beaverton and Tigard.

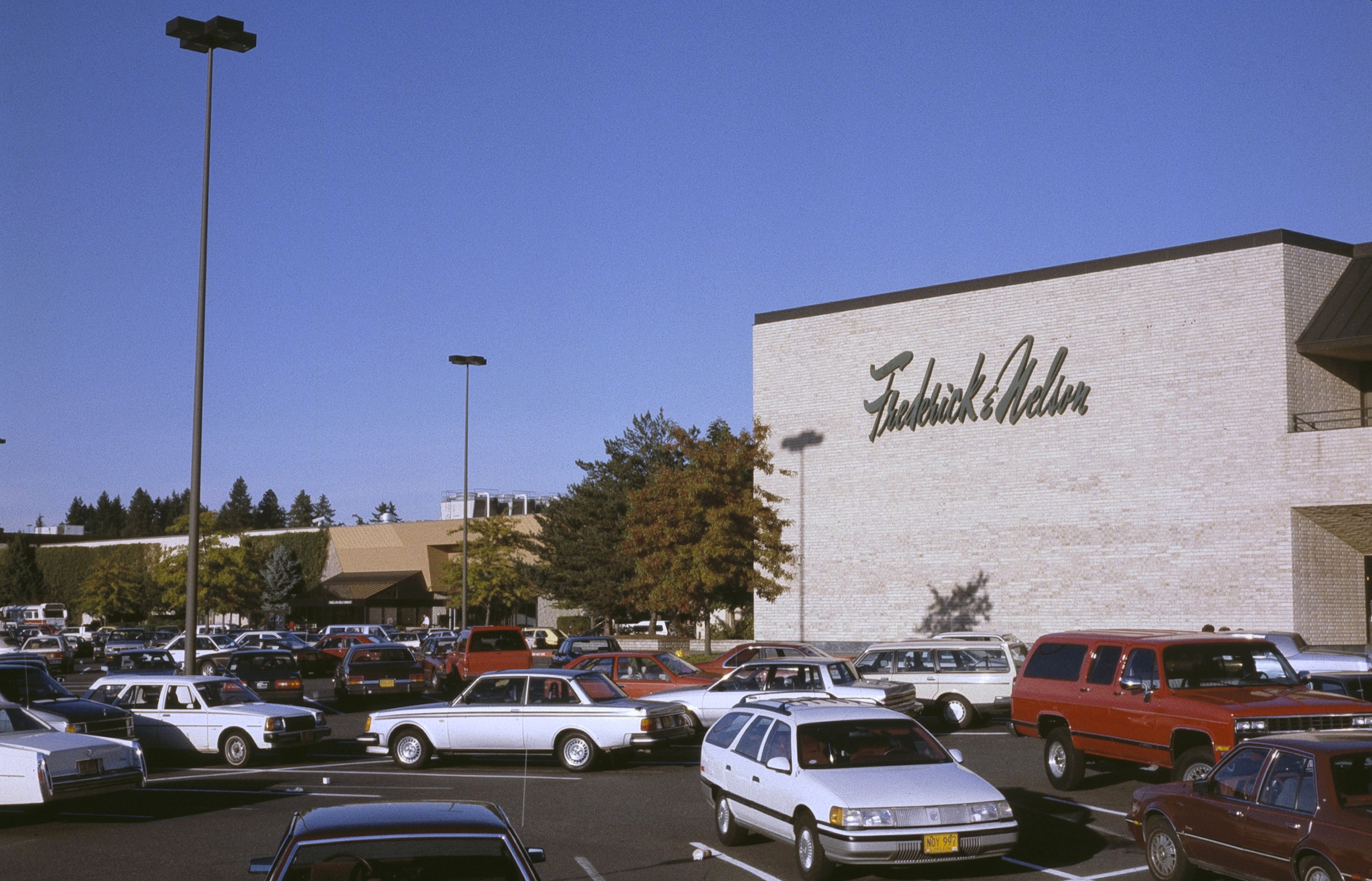
The west side of the mall in 1988, before expansion filled in this area

In April 1978, the Liberty House store, located on the mall's north side, was taken over by Frederick & Nelson (F&N). The following year, Frederick & Nelson acquired the entire Lipman's chain, and in connection with that acquisition, F&N moved within the mall from the space it had occupied for only one year to the much larger ex-Lipman's space, on the mall's west side. Mervyn's took over the space vacated by F&N and originally occupied by Liberty House, opening its 80,000-square-foot (7,400 m^{2}) store in October 1979.

In 1986, the cities of Beaverton, Tigard, and Portland fought to annex the unincorporated territory on which the mall was located. Tigard was awarded the right to annex Washington Square along with other adjacent properties that contain Lincoln Center and the Embassy Suites Hotel. Following Frederick & Nelson's bankruptcy and store closure in January 1991, Nordstrom acquired the vacant space and demolished it, constructing a larger replacement for its existing store; this new Nordstrom opened in 1994. At that time, the former Nordstrom space was acquired by the mall and reconfigured as a food court and additional retail space, coinciding with the renovation of the mall. By the mid-1990s the mall had an average sales per square foot that placed it in the top 10% of malls nationwide.

In December 1998, the mall was sold by Safeco, a Seattle-headquartered insurance company, to a partnership of The Macerich Company and Ontario Teachers' Pension Plan (OTPP); at the time of the sale Washington Square was "one of the most productive malls on the West Coast", with sales approaching $500 per square foot. Macerich, a Real Estate Investment Trust, took over management of the property.

In 2005, Macerich opened a 100,000 sq ft (9,300 m^{2}) addition, housing 30 more stores (including The Cheesecake Factory, Sephora, Godiva Chocolatier, and Williams Sonoma). At the same time, other improvements were made throughout the mall and two new parking structures were added. Mervyn's closed in November 2005 and their location, which they owned, was sold to the mall. The site was refurbished and reopened as Dick's Sporting Goods in March 2008.

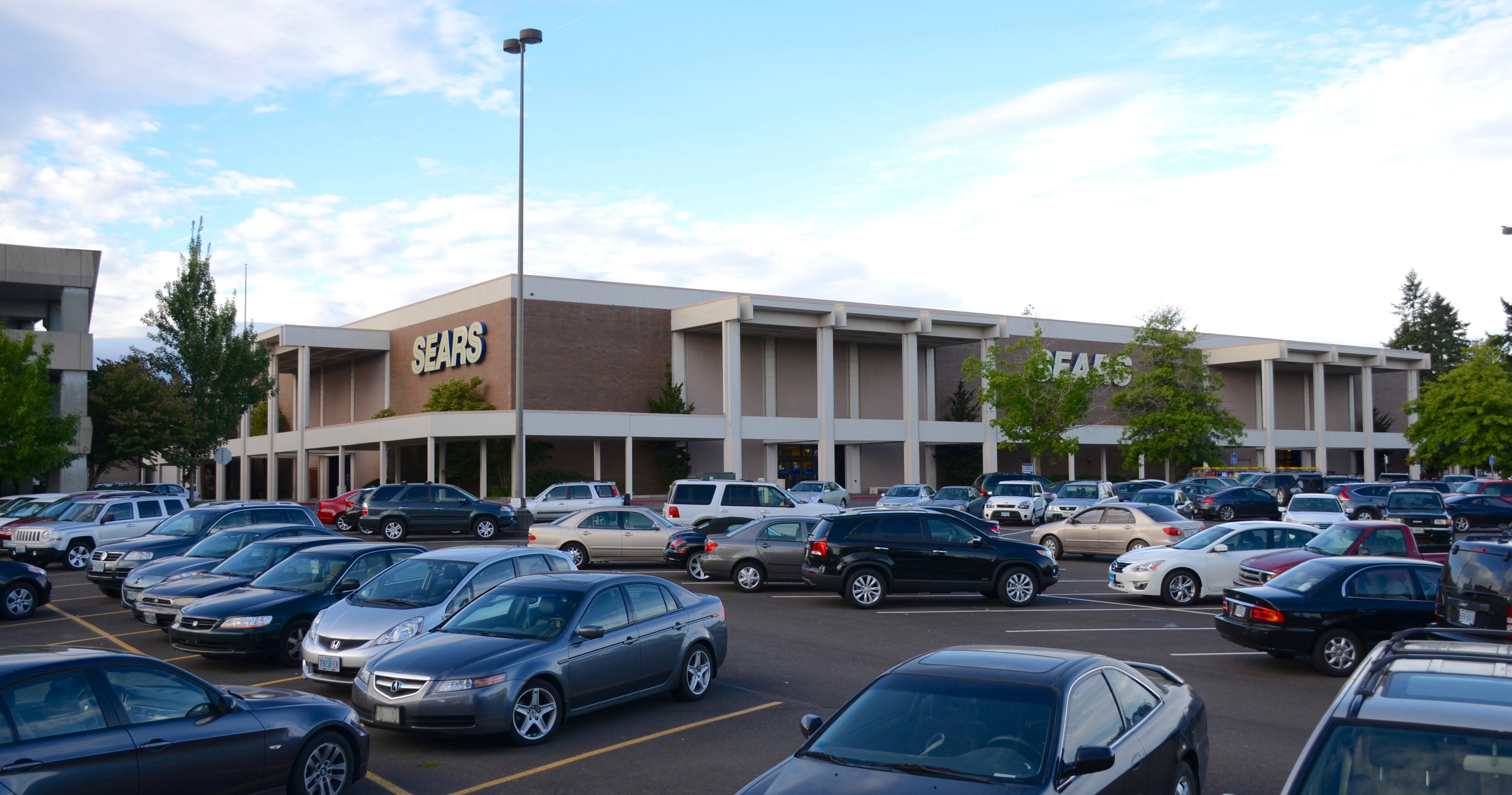
The Sears store opened in 1973, as one of the mall's first tenants. It closed in early 2019, and the still-vacant building was demolished in 2026.

In February 2011, Swedish clothing retailer H&M opened their doors at Washington Square. It is the company's second location in Oregon.

In 2015, Sears Holdings spun off 235 properties, including the Sears at Washington Square, into Seritage Growth Properties.

On October 15, 2018, original anchor store Sears announced that their location at Washington Square would be closing as part of the chain's bankruptcy filing, by early 2019. Demolition of the former Sears space began in early 2026, as part of a major renovation of that part of the mall. Dick’s Sporting Goods plans to open one of their large format Dick’s House of Sport concept stores in the space of the former Sears. The store is currently under construction and expected to open in 2027.

== Layout ==
The current configuration has five department store anchors, 210 specialty shops & restaurants, and a food court. Some of the stores are located in an adjacent outdoor plaza known as "Square Too". Most of the mall is on a single level; however, the anchor stores have multiple levels, the food court is on a second level, and the expansion in 2005 was built so that it could accommodate a second-level addition at a later date. Discussions were made in 2021 to convert some of it into housing.

TriMet maintains the Washington Square Transit Center on the mall's premises.

== See also ==
- List of shopping malls in Oregon
