= Oregon Route 8 =

State highway in Washington County, Oregon, US

Oregon Route 8
- Route 8 highlighted in red

Route information
- Maintained by ODOT
- Length: 19.20 mi (30.90 km)
- Existed: 1957–present

Major junctions
- West end: OR 6 near Gales Creek
- OR 47 in Forest Grove; OR 219 in Hillsboro; OR 217 in Beaverton
- East end: US 26 in Beaverton

Location
- Country: United States
- State: Oregon
- County: Washington

Highway system
- Oregon Highways; Interstate; US; State; Named; Scenic
← OR 7	→ OR 10

Oregon Route 8, also known as Oregon Highway 8, is an Oregon state highway which serves the western suburbs of Portland. The road is locally known as Canyon Road and Tualatin Valley Highway (Also known as TV Highway), and travels through the center of the Tualatin Valley. Tualatin Valley Highway runs between the cities of McMinnville and Beaverton. Between McMinnville and Forest Grove, the highway is signed as Oregon Route 47; between Forest Grove and Beaverton it is signed as Oregon Route 8. Oregon 8 becomes Canyon Road in Beaverton east of Hocken Road.

Oregon 8 is located entirely within Washington County. The portion of the route from US 26 to Oregon Route 47 is part of the National Highway System, listed as a principal arterial.

== Route description ==
The eastern terminus of OR 8 is an interchange with U.S. Route 26 (which is, at that point, the Sunset Highway) just west of the Portland city limits and the Washington-Multnomah county line. Initially, it is also known as Canyon Road, since it comes out of the gulch in which the Sunset Highway runs. The official designation, beginning from the eastern terminus, is the Tualatin Valley Highway No. 29 (see Oregon highways and routes).

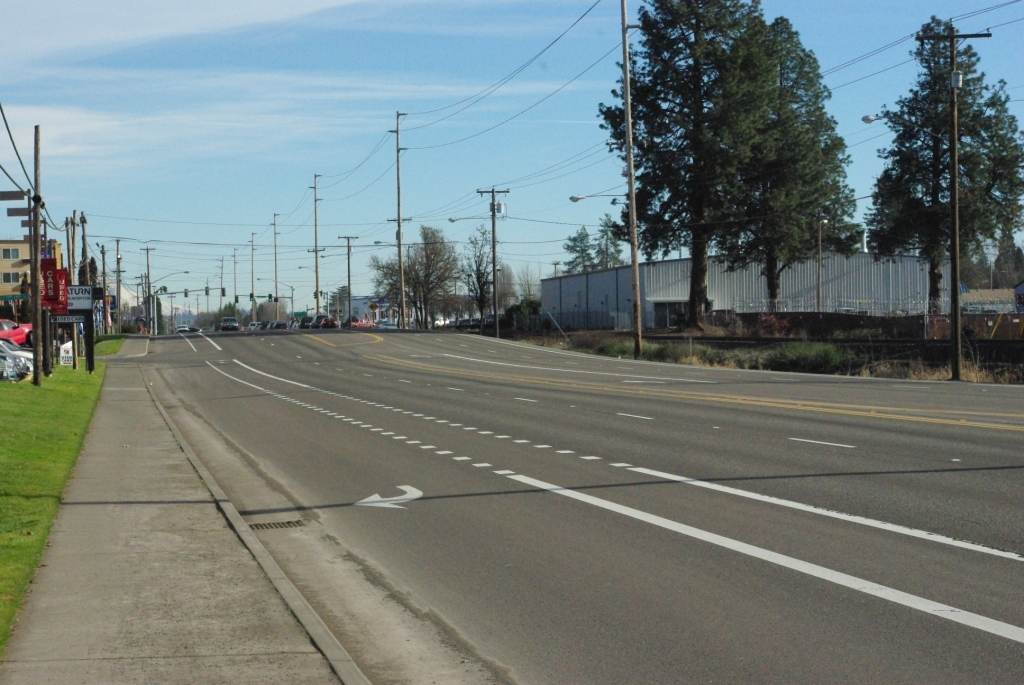
The highway in Beaverton near Murray Boulevard looking east

Continuing west, OR 8 enters the suburb of Beaverton, and after its interchange with Oregon Route 217, a freeway, its posted name changes to the Tualatin Valley (TV) Highway at Hocken Avenue. It comes within one block of Oregon Route 10, running parallel but never intersecting, although commuters often use surface streets to change between the highways.

TV Highway continues west as an expressway out of Beaverton, through the communities of unincorporated urban Washington County, including Aloha, where it runs right next to chipmaker Intel's facilities. The highway continues into the Hillsboro neighborhoods of Reedville and Witch Hazel, where it intersects with Cornelius Pass Road at Reedville. It then continues into the city proper of Hillsboro, running north–south as 10th Avenue before turning east–west with traffic split into a one-way pair. Westbound traffic runs as Baseline Street and eastbound traffic runs on Oak Street. In downtown Hillsboro it receives the northern terminus of Oregon Route 219, which is 1st Avenue.

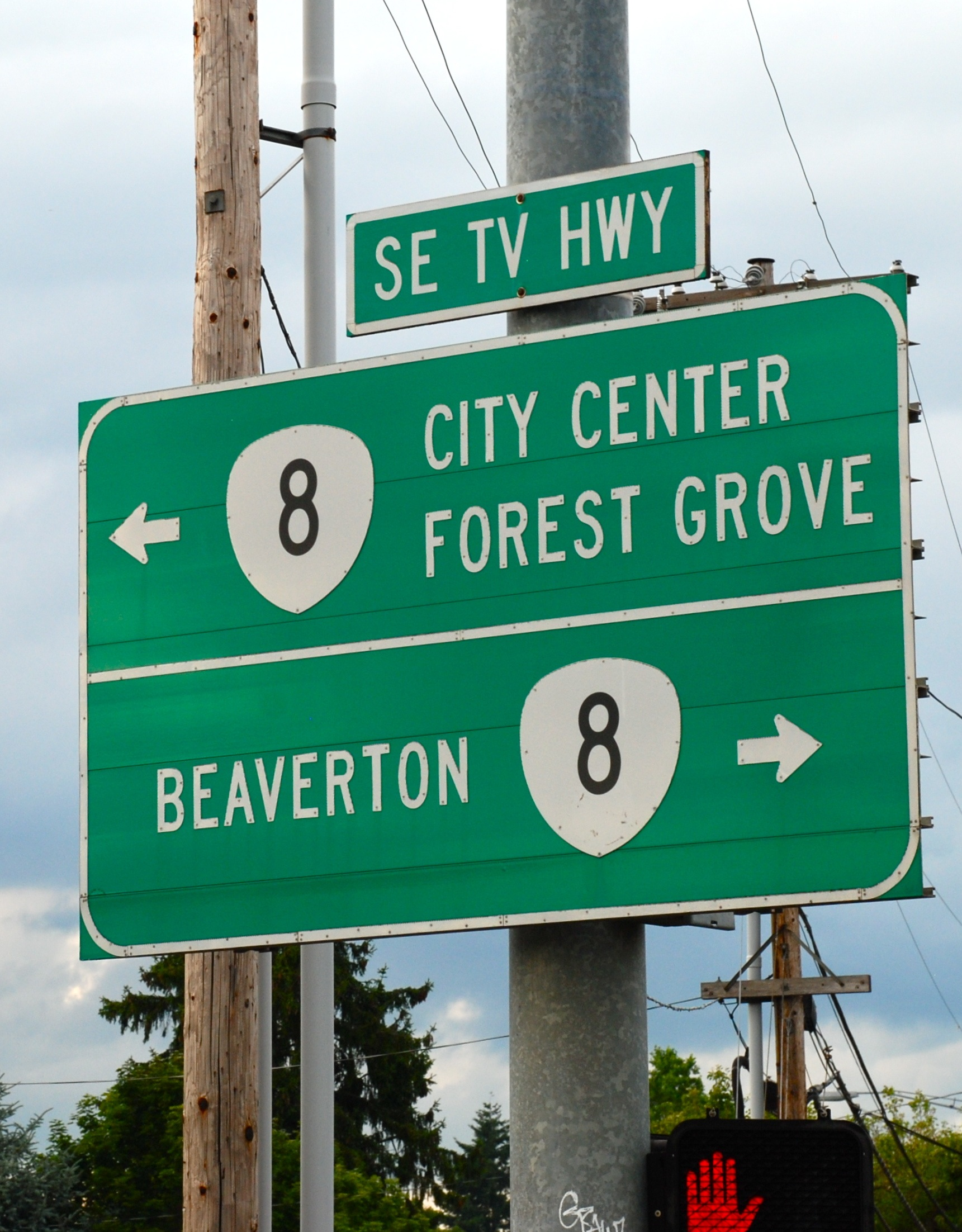
Highway 8 signs near downtown Hillsboro

After passing through downtown Hillsboro, OR 8 moves westward through the adjoined towns of Cornelius and Forest Grove, passing next to Pacific University. At Cornelius the road is again split into a one-way pair, with westbound traffic running on Adair Street, and eastbound on Baseline. In Forest Grove, it intersects with Oregon Route 47, where it becomes part of the Nehalem Highway No. 102. TV Highway continues as OR 47 south to McMinnville. In downtown Forest Grove the road splits again, with eastbound traffic running on 19th Street, and westbound on Pacific Avenue. West of Forest Grove, OR 8 is known as Gales Creek Road, which is not actually a state highway; after passing through some farmland west of Forest Grove, including the community of Gales Creek, OR 8 reaches its western terminus in an intersection with Oregon Route 6 south of the community of Glenwood.

== History ==
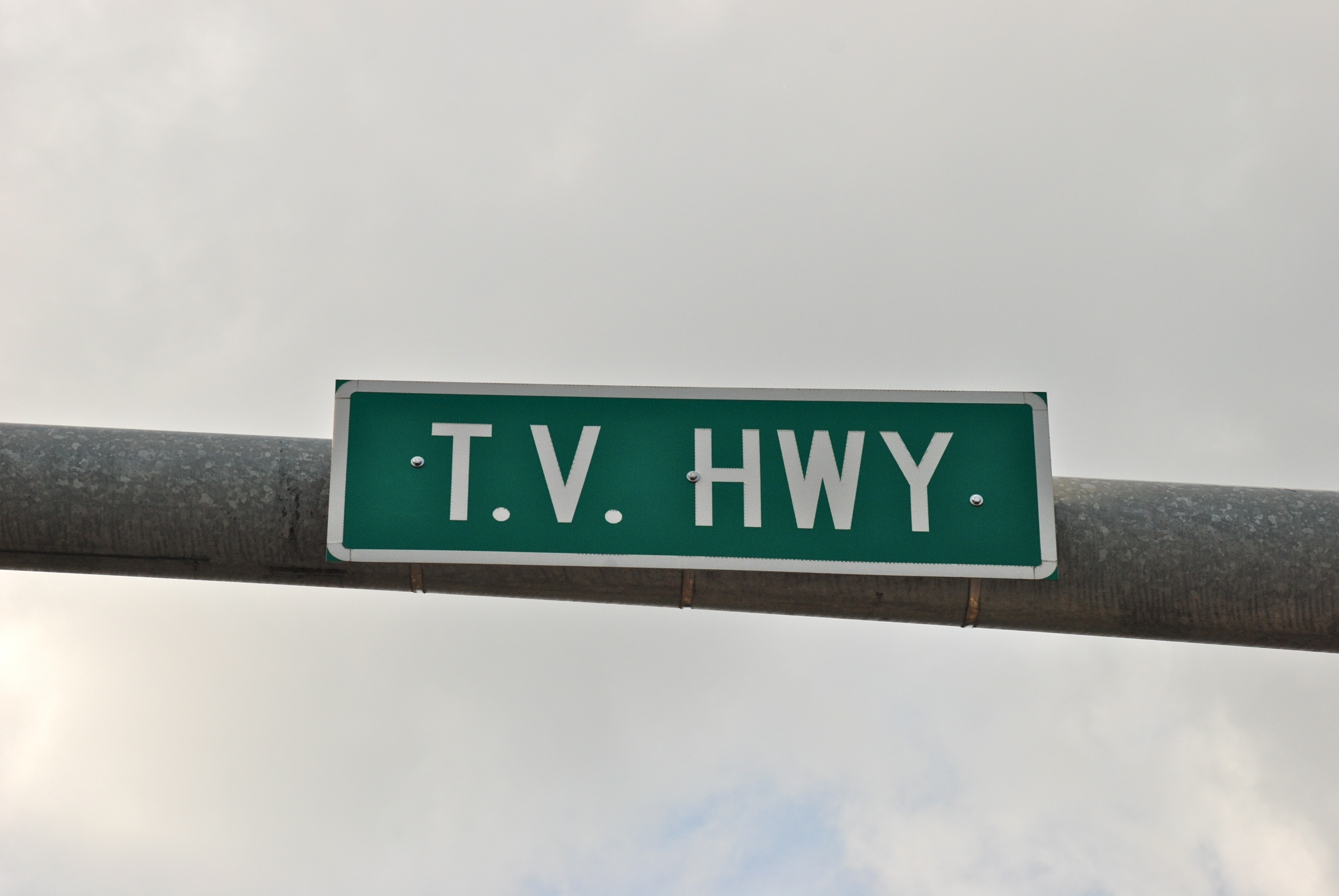
T.V. Highway sign in southeast Hillsboro

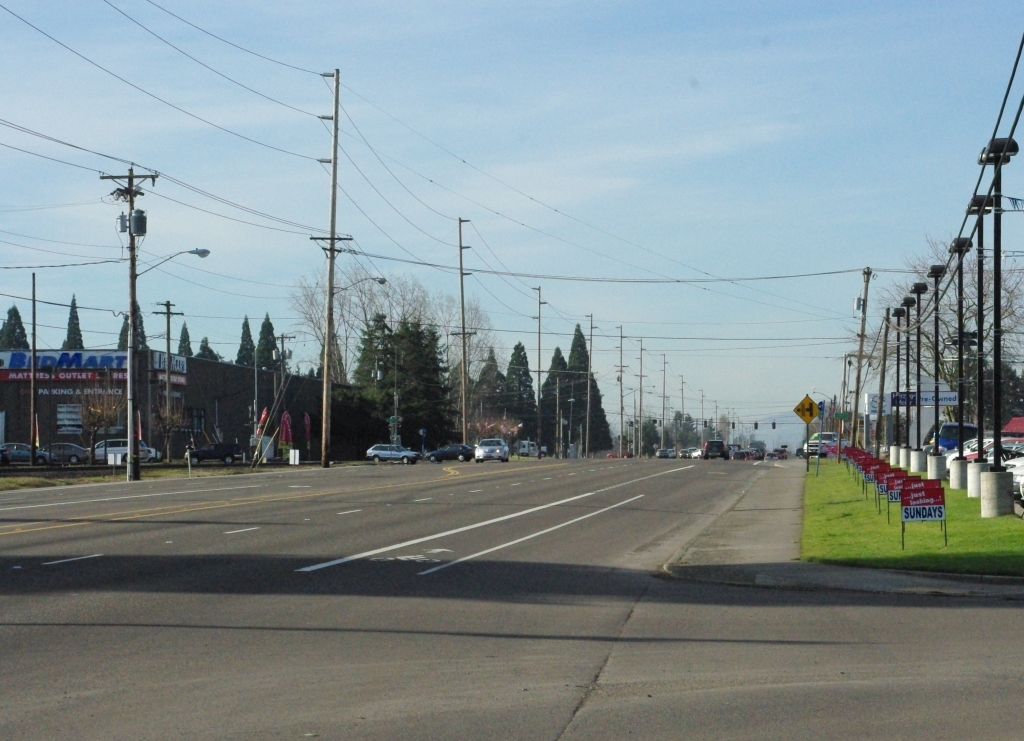
Highway in Beaverton near change to Canyon Road

The section between Beaverton and Hillsboro was built around 1918. Constructed of cement, it partly replaced a county road built of dirt that ran on the southern side of the railroad tracks. The earlier road came from Portland via Bertha Blvd. on Farmington Road and veered north on what is now Kinnaman Road until 209th Avenue in Reedville, where it then ran parallel to the rail tracks. At Witch Hazel it then followed the modern Witch Hazel and River roads into Hillsboro proper. In 1918, the highway was included as part of Oregon's state highways list as Forest Grove-McMinnville Highway No. 29.

Hillsboro decided in March 1919 to have the new road travel along Baseline Street, two blocks south of Main Street where the road was to run.

In March 1953, Washington County planners decided to have the highway widened to four lanes from Beaverton to Forest Grove. The city of Beaverton paid $5.8 million in urban renewal funds to build an overpass between Murray and 170th Avenue that removed a railroad crossing in 1983.

== Major intersections ==
Note: mileposts do not reflect actual mileage due to realignments.

County	Location	mi	km	Destinations	Notes
Washington				OR 6 – Banks, Portland, Glenwood, Tillamook	
Washington	Forest Grove	17.88	28.78	OR 47 – Banks, Seaside, Yamhill, McMinnville	
Washington	Hillsboro	13.21	21.26	OR 219 – Scholls, Newberg	
Washington	Hillsboro	8.32	13.39	Cornelius Pass Road	
Washington	Beaverton	4.02	6.47	Hocken Avenue to Cedar Hills Boulevard / Farmington Road (OR 10)	
Washington	Beaverton	3.60	5.79	Watson Avenue – Progress, Farmington	Former OR 217 south
Washington	Beaverton	2.89	4.65	OR 217 to I-5 / US 26	interchange
Multnomah		0.00	0.00	Sylvan	Interchange; eastbound exit and westbound entrance
Multnomah		0.00	0.00	US 26 east – Portland	Interchange; eastbound exit and westbound entrance; US 26 exit 71A
1.000 mi = 1.609 km; 1.000 km = 0.621 mi: Incomplete access

For the TV highway, those portions not on Oregon Route 8 are:

County	Location	mi	km	Destinations	Notes
Yamhill	St. Joseph	40.99	65.97	OR 99W – McMinnville, Newberg, Portland	
Yamhill	Yamhill	33.00	53.11	OR 240 east – Newberg	
1.000 mi = 1.609 km; 1.000 km = 0.621 mi: Concurrency terminus

== Public transport ==
TriMet bus route 57-TV Hwy. provides public transit service over the full length of the section between Forest Grove and Beaverton.

== See also ==
- Transportation in Portland, Oregon
