= Raleigh Hills, Oregon =

Unincorporated community in the state of Oregon, United States

- Census-designated place (CDP)
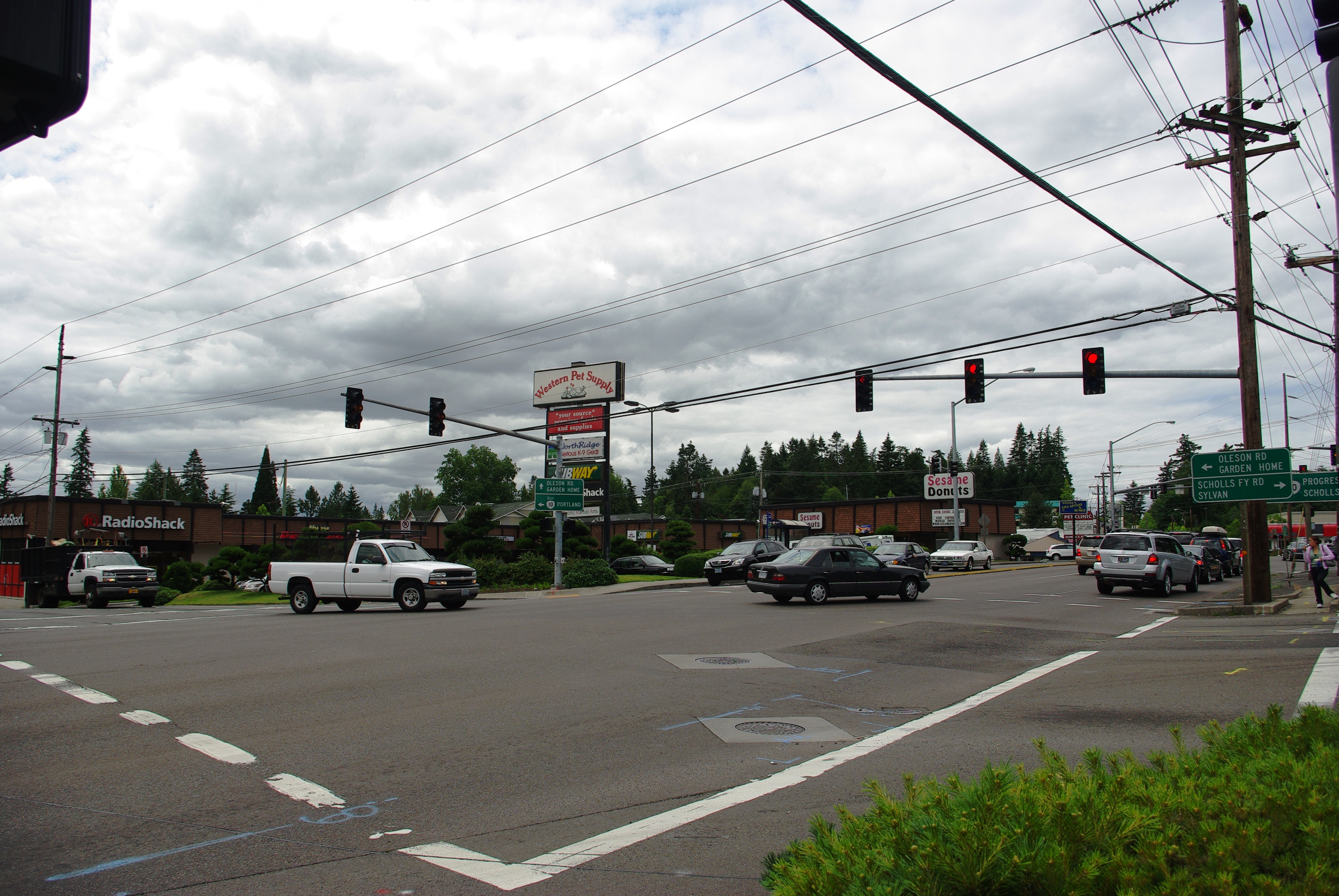
- Beaverton-Hillsdale Highway and Scholls Ferry Road

- Location of Raleigh Hills, Oregon
- Coordinates: 45°29′30″N 122°45′00″W
- Country: United States
- State: Oregon
- County: Washington

Area
  - Total: 1.52 sq mi (3.94 km^{2})
  - Land: 1.52 sq mi (3.94 km^{2})
  - Water: 0 sq mi (0.00 km^{2})
- Elevation: 285 ft (87 m)

Population (2020)
  - Total: 6,196
  - Density: 4,074.2/sq mi (1,573.07/km^{2})
- Time zone: UTC-8 (Pacific (PST))
  - Summer (DST): UTC-7 (PDT)
- FIPS code: 41-60900
- GNIS feature ID: 2409125

Raleigh Hills is a census-designated place and neighborhood in Washington County, Oregon within the metropolitan area of Portland, Oregon, United States. It is located in the southwest hills in Washington County, with Beaverton to the west, West Slope to the north, and Progress and Garden Home to the south. As of the 2020 census, Raleigh Hills had a population of 6,196.

Raleigh Hills is located at the intersection of Oregon Routes 10 and 210. Fire protection and EMS services are provided through Tualatin Valley Fire and Rescue. Raleigh Hills is also the location of the first ever New Seasons Market.

== History ==
Raleigh Hills was named after Raleigh Robinson, a resident of the neighborhood. A post office named Raleigh was established in the area in April 1892, and was closed twelve years later. Southern Pacific's Red Electric line had a stop in Raleigh from 1914 until the line ceased operations in 1929. A Raleigh Hills branch of the Portland post office was opened in 1968.

== Geography ==
According to the United States Census Bureau, the neighborhood has a total area of four km^{2} (1.5 sq mi), all land.

== Demographics ==
Historical population
Census	Pop.	Note	%±
2020	6,196		—
U.S. Decennial Census

As of the census of 2000, there were 5865 people in the neighborhood, organized into 2586 households and 1561 families. The population density was 3,829.5 inhabitants per square mile (1,478.6/km^{2}). There were 2,786 housing units at an average density of 1,819.1 per square mile (702.4/km^{2}). The racial makeup of the CDP was 90.08% White, 3.10% Asian, 0.99% African American, 0.31% Native American, 0.19% Pacific Islander, 3.34% from other races, and 1.99% from two or more races. 5.75% of the population were Hispanic or Latino of any race.

There were 2,586 households, out of which 25.6% had children under the age of 18 living with them, 50.8% were married couples living together, 6.3% had a female householder with no husband present, and 39.6% were non-families. 33.4% of all households were made up of individuals, and 12.5% had someone living alone who was 65 years of age or older. The average household size was 2.26 and the average family size was 2.91.

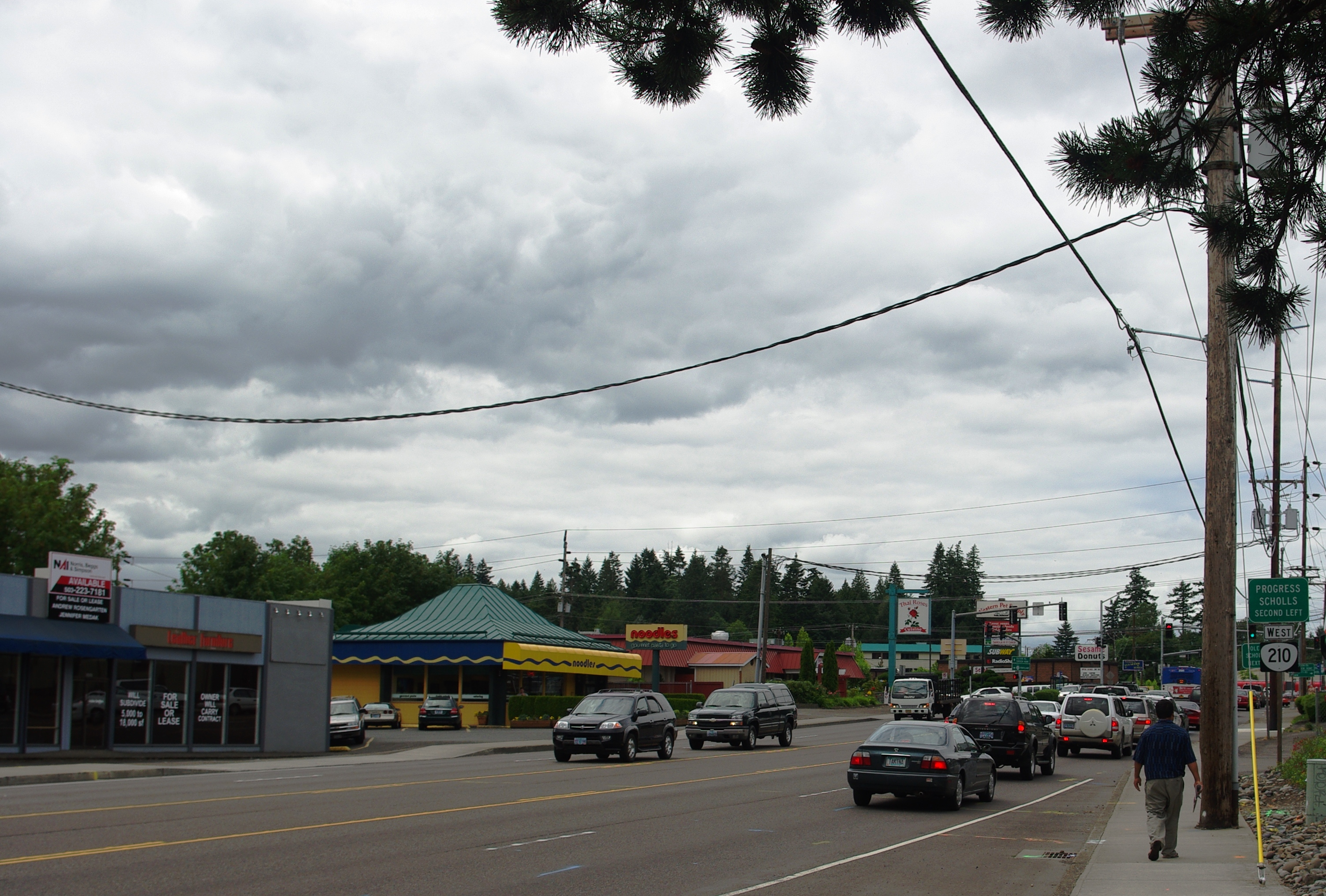
Commercial area along Beaverton-Hillsdale Highway looking west

In the neighborhood the population was spread out, with 21.5% under the age of 18, 6.5% from 18 to 24, 25.6% from 25 to 44, 28.2% from 45 to 64, and 18.2% who were 65 years of age or older. The median age was 43 years. For every 100 females, there were 95.3 males. For every 100 females age 18 and over, there were 90.4 males.

The median income for a household in the neighborhood was $60,714, and the median income for a family was $83,300. Males had a median income of $60,186 versus $34,769 for females. The per capita income for the CDP was $37,839. 7.4% of the population and 5.0% of families were below the poverty line. Out of the total population, 11.7% of those under the age of 18 and 2.0% of those 65 and older were living below the poverty line.

== Education ==
The majority is in the Beaverton School District 48J. A portion to the north is in the Portland School District 1J.
