= Oregon Route 217 =

Freeway in the Portland, OR, metro area

Oregon Route 217
- OR 217 highlighted in red

Route information
- Maintained by ODOT
- Length: 7.52 mi (12.10 km)

Major junctions
- South end: I-5 in Lake Oswego
- OR 99W in Tigard; OR 210 in Beaverton; OR 141 in Beaverton; OR 8 / OR 10 in Beaverton
- North end: US 26 in Beaverton

Location
- Country: United States
- State: Oregon
- County: Washington

Highway system
- Oregon Highways; Interstate; US; State; Named; Scenic
← OR 216	→ OR 218

Oregon Route 217 (OR 217), also known as the Beaverton-Tigard Highway No. 144, is a north-south controlled-access state highway in Washington County, Oregon. The route travels along the west suburbs of Portland, starting at US Route 26 (US 26) in Beaverton and ending at Interstate 5 (I-5) in Tigard.

OR 217 was initially a route on surface streets which ran from OR 8 in Beaverton and Wilsonville. Construction of the current freeway segment occurred from the mid-1960s to the early 1970s, with the highway re-routed onto it afterwards.

== Route description ==
OR 217 begins at an interchange with US 26 and nearby Barnes Road near the St. Vincent Hospital. It then travels southwest before reaching Walker Road, after which it travels south towards Canyon Road (OR 8) and Beaverton Hillsdale Highway (OR 10), passing the Beaverton Town Center. Directly after the interchange, the highway turns southeasterly before turning back south right before the Denney Road interchange.

The highway intersects Hall Boulevard near the Hall/Nimbus WES station and Scholls Ferry Road, and then proceeds to turn back southeast. The highway continues southeast for the rest of its route, after which it passes Greenburg Road and nearby Washington Square. The highway then intersects OR 99W and 72nd Avenue. After that, it enters an interchange with I-5, with southbound traffic continuing east towards Lake Oswego as Kruse Way.

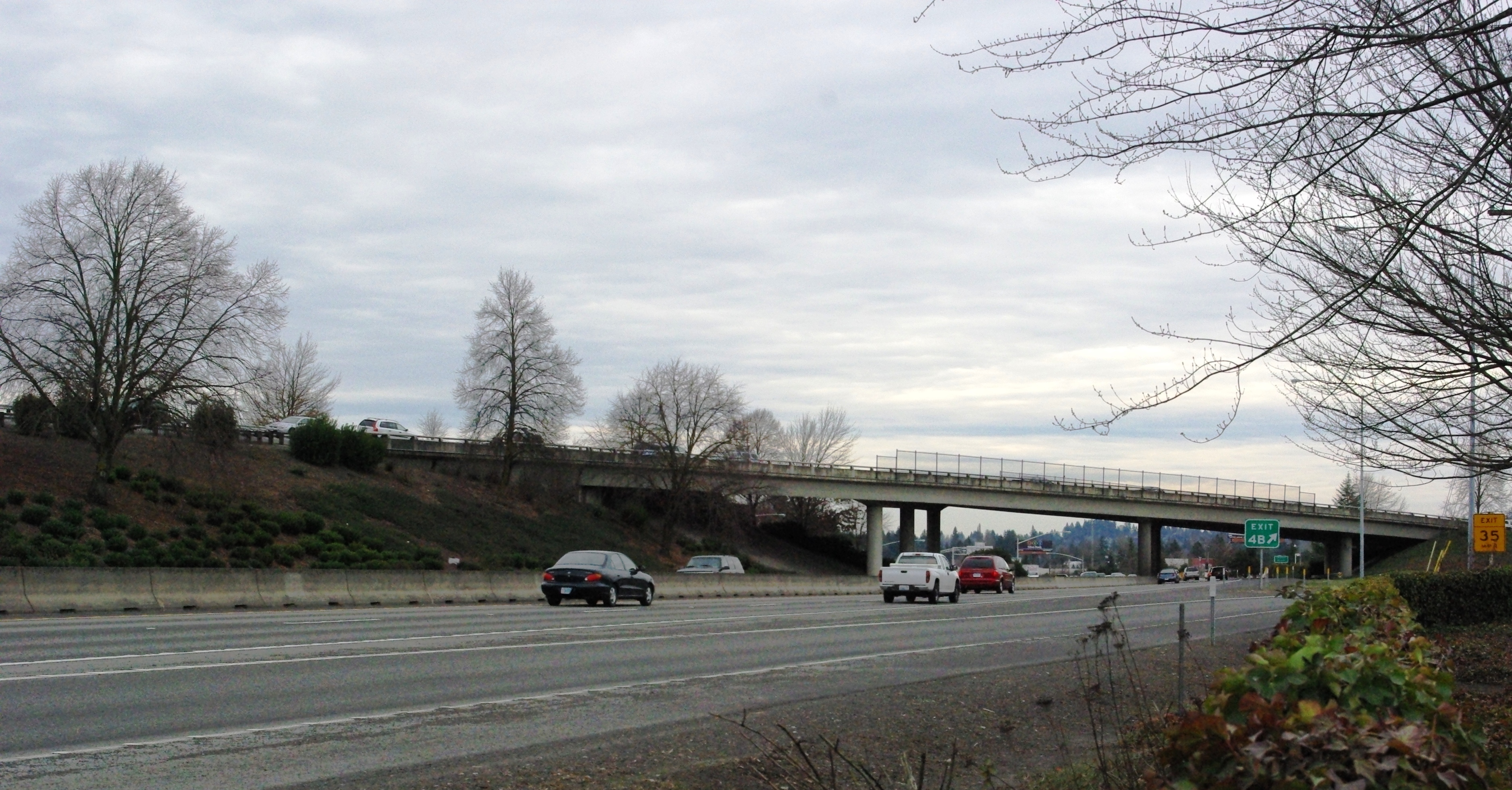
OR 217 at OR 210

For most of its length, OR 217 is a freeway with two travel lanes in each direction, with a third weave lane for exiting and merging, with the exception of its two termini. TriMet's Westside Express Service, a commuter rail line, runs parallel to the highway between Tigard and Beaverton.

== History ==
OR 217 originally ran along surface streets before it was relocated to freeway sections. The highway started at the junction of OR 8 and Hall Boulevard. in Beaverton, continuing along Hall Boulevard through Beaverton, Progress, Metzger, and Tigard for seven miles (11 km) until it reached Durham Road. There, it took a left onto Durham Road, following it for about 0.8 miles (1.3 km) until the intersection with Boones Ferry Road. It remained on Boones Ferry Road through Durham, Tualatin, and Wilsonville for about 8 miles (13 km), crossing the Willamette River on the Boones Ferry and continuing south for another five miles (8.0 km) until finally ending at OR 99E at Aurora, for a grand total of about 20 miles (32 km) or so. The southern terminus was scaled back to Wilsonville (current I-5 exit 286) with the completion of I-5 to Portland. This older highway, called the Beaverton-Aurora Highway, was kept in the state highway system as the Beaverton-Tualatin Highway No. 141, and was recently given the route designation OR 141.

The freeway carrying OR 217 was built in the mid-1960s to early 1970s in several stages, generally beginning at the south end. The full length of the freeway was repaved for the first time in the mid-1980s, along with the replacement of metal median barriers with concrete dividers. By 1985, approximately 60,000 to 68,000 vehicles used OR 217 daily. The intersection of OR 217 and US 26 in Beaverton was replaced with an interchange in 1986 after two years of construction.

In December 2021, ODOT started construction on the Auxiliary Lanes Project, which aims to add a southbound auxiliary lane from exit 2A to exit 6 and a northbound auxiliary lane from exit 6 to exit 4. The Allen Boulevard southbound on-ramp and Denney Road southbound off-ramp have been removed for a new frontage road being constructed in place of it. The frontage road opened in November 2023. In late 2025, the Auxiliary Lanes Project was completed. The project is expected to decrease crashes by 20-30% and save 73,000 hours of travel time annually. Final cleanup and landscaping work is continuing into 2026.

== Exit list ==
The entire route is in Washington County.

Location	mi	km	Exit	Destinations	Notes
Tigard	7.52	12.10		I-5 – Portland, Salem; Kruse Way – Lake Oswego	I-5 exit 292; roadway continues as Kruse Way
Tigard	6.69	10.77	7	72nd Avenue	Only accessible from northbound on-ramp coming from Kruse Way
Tigard	5.90	9.50	6	OR 99W – Tigard, McMinnville	
Tigard	4.95	7.97	5	Greenburg Road – Metzger	
Beaverton	4.27	6.87	4B	OR 210 (Scholls Ferry Road)	Signed as exit 4 northbound
Beaverton	3.82	6.15	4A	Hall Boulevard (OR 141)	Southbound exit and entrance
Beaverton	3.02	4.86	3	Denney Road	Northbound exit and entrance
Beaverton	2.48	3.99	2B	Allen Boulevard	Northbound exit and entrance
Beaverton	2.26	3.64	2B	Allen Boulevard/Denney Road	Formerly exit 2B (Allen Blvd) and 3 (Denney Rd). Southbound exit and entrance
Beaverton	1.76– 1.47	2.83– 2.37	2A	OR 8 (Canyon Road) / OR 10 – Beaverton	
Beaverton	0.91	1.46	1	Walker Road	
Beaverton	0.19	0.31	—	Cedar Hills	Northbound exit and southbound entrance
Beaverton	0.01	0.016	—	US 26 (Sunset Highway) – Tillamook, Astoria, Portland	Northbound exit and southbound entrance, US 26 exit 69A
0.00	0.00		Barnes Road		
1.000 mi = 1.609 km; 1.000 km = 0.621 mi: Incomplete access
