= Scholls, Oregon =

Unincorporated community in the state of Oregon, United States

- Unincorporated community
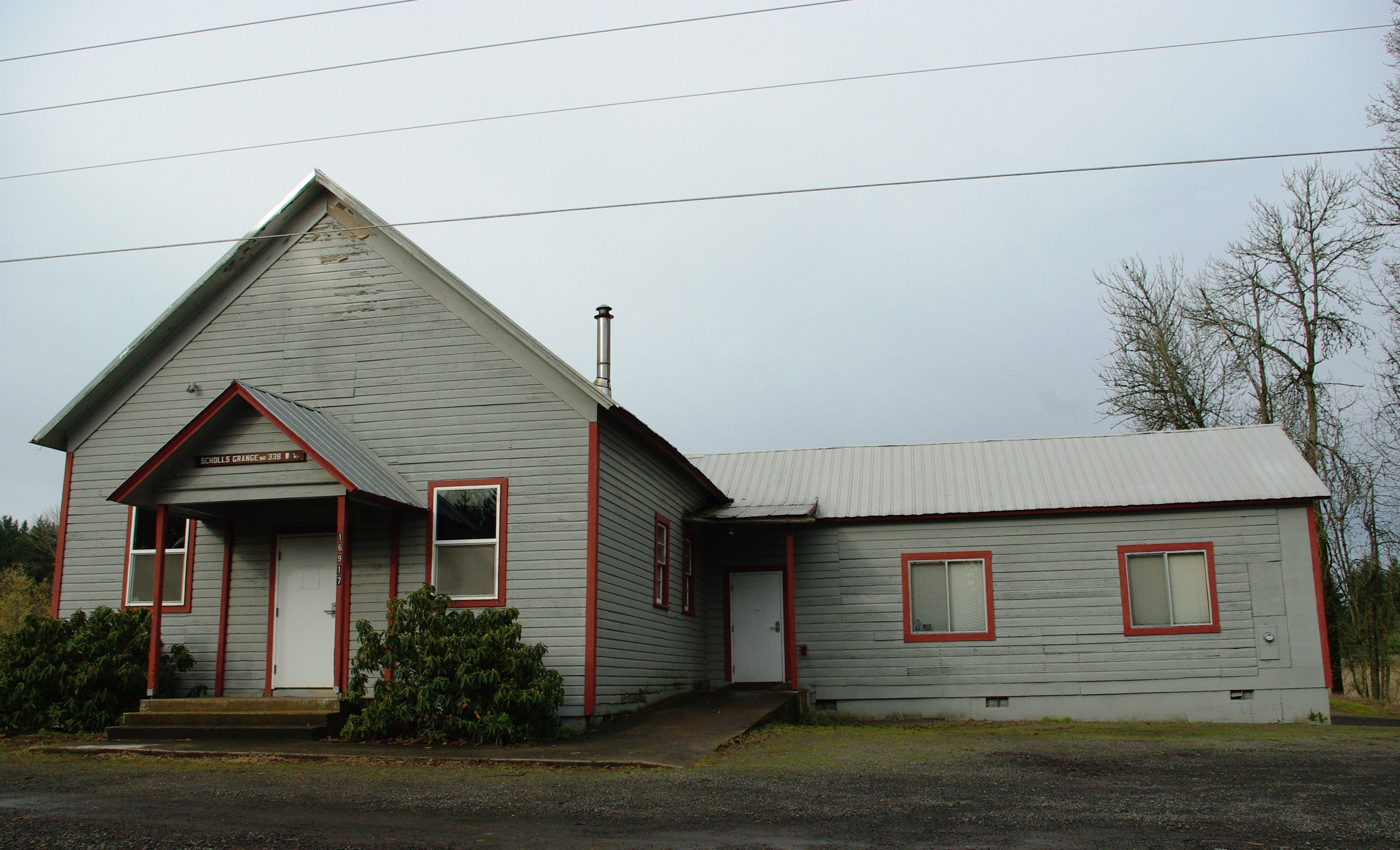
- Scholls Grange

- Location within the state of Oregon Scholls, Oregon (the United States)
- Coordinates: 45°24′29″N 122°55′20″W
- Country: United States
- State: Oregon
- County: Washington
- Elevation: 151 ft (46 m)
- Time zone: UTC-8 (Pacific (PST))
  - Summer (DST): UTC-7 (PDT)
- ZIP code: 97140,97123
- Area codes: 503 and 971
- GNIS feature ID: 1158471

Scholls, Oregon is an unincorporated community in Washington County, Oregon, United States. It is located along the southern shore of the Tualatin River, near the intersection of Oregon Routes 210 and 219. Scholls is located approximately seven miles north of Newberg, seven miles west of Tigard and eight miles south of Hillsboro. The area around Scholls is primarily agricultural.

== History ==
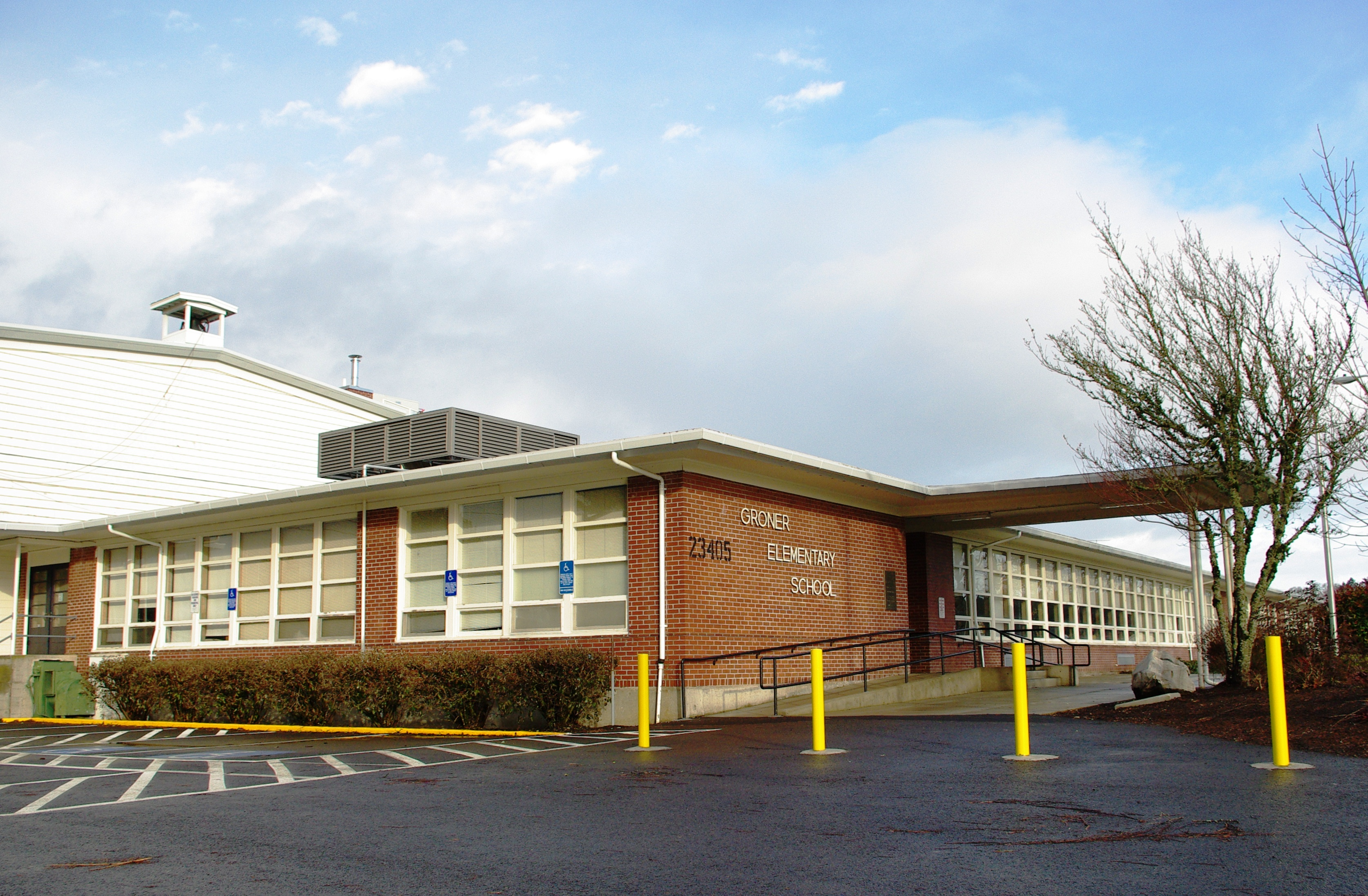
Groner Elementary School

According to Oregon Geographic Names, the community was named after local pioneer Peter Scholl, who took up a donation land claim in 1847. Scholls was once the site of an important ferry (Scholls Ferry) crossing the Tualatin River between Scholls and nearby Kinton. While the ferry has long since been replaced with a bridge, OR 210 is still known locally as Scholls Ferry Road.

Peter Scholl was a relative of Daniel Boone, probably related through Boone's grandson Alphonso Boone, an Oregon pioneer who built Boones Ferry. A general store has operated in the community since the 1890s, and was purchased by the Petrich family in 1964. The original Petrichs General Store burned down in 1994.

"Scholls Ferry" post office was established in 1871, and the name changed to "Scholls" in 1895. Scholls' ZIP Code is 97123.

== Campo Azul ==
Campo Azul was a migrant camp located on a farm near Scholls (on the east side of Scholls Ferry Road, on the north bank of the Tualatin River). The camp, which was founded in the 1970s, was named for the color of the housing units which were on the 133-acre (0.54 km^{2}) farm. Historically farmworkers, and in some cases their children, lived on the farm and worked on surrounding area farms. For many decades, as many as 90 or so adults and children lived at the camp. According to The Oregonian, the camp had initially been considered as a location for the New Thought church Living Enrichment Center. Upon the death of Loraine Boggs, the ownership of the camp was in dispute. Only after various legal negotiations was ownership of the farm settled. The farm was sold in 2004, and by 2009 the new owners began operating a U-pick Pumpkin Patch and a livestock sheep operation. Today, the farm is also a rustic venue for private events and celebrations; and a place for community farming.
