= Progress, Oregon =

Neighborhood in Washington County, Oregon, United States

Coordinates: 45°27′25.42″N 122°46′55.35″W

Location of Progress within the state of Oregon

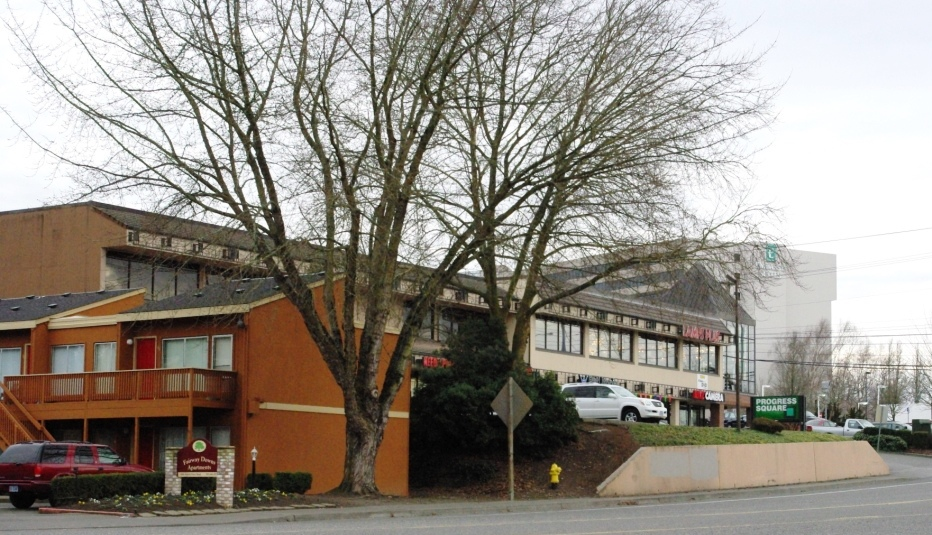
Business and apartments in Progress

Progress is a former unincorporated community in Washington County, Oregon, United States. It is now part of the cities of Tigard and Beaverton. It is located at the crossroads of Scholls Ferry Road and Hall Boulevard (unsigned Oregon Route 141). The Progress area is home to Washington Square, a large shopping mall that opened in Tigard in 1973–1974.

== Geography ==
The portion of Progress located within Tigard's city limits is in the quadrant east of Scholls Ferry Road and South of Hall Boulevard. This area is the site of the historic Crescent Grove Cemetery (aka Progress Cemetery), founded in 1852. The remaining three quadrants of the crossroads at Progress are located in the City of Beaverton, with the portion north of Hall Boulevard in the Denny Whitford/Raleigh West neighborhood, and the portion south of Hall Boulevard in the Greenway neighborhood. Progress Station #53 of Tualatin Valley Fire & Rescue is located in the Denny Whitford/Raleigh West neighborhood of Beaverton.

== History ==
Progress had a post office from August 28, 1899, to July 11, 1904. The first postmaster was Joseph Hingley.

In 1915, Progress was described as a village along the interurban Portland, Eugene & Eastern Railroad (P.E. & E.). It had a Methodist and an Episcopal church, as well as a grade school. At that time the primary economic activities were horticulture and agriculture. The former P.E. & E. line is now the Tigard Branch of the Portland and Western Railroad, which is also in use by WES Commuter Rail (WES). WES' Hall/Nimbus station is the closest stop to Progress.

By 1989, Lewis A. McArthur noted that Progress was "part of a heavily built suburbia" between Tigard and Beaverton. In 1990, author Ralph Friedman commented that Progress had been "[e]ngulfed by the giant mart of Washington Square."

=== View-Master plant ===
Sawyer's, later General Aniline & Film (GAF), the manufacturer of View-Master reels, built a large plant near Progress in 1951. The plant closed in 2000, and this area later became part of Washington Square Mall. The View-Master factory supply well was investigated for possible chemical contamination in the early 2000's.

=== RedTail Golf Center ===
The City of Portland Parks and Recreation RedTail Golf Course in Beaverton was originally named "Progress Downs". The land, a former farm, was purchased in 1954 by the city to replace the West Hills Golf Course, which was to be the new site of the Washington Park Zoo. The course opened in 1966. Progress Downs was renamed RedTail after a 1999 renovation. In 2024, the city was considering selling the golf course to develop a Major League Baseball Park.
