= National Register of Historic Places listings in Yamhill County, Oregon =

Location of Yamhill County in Oregon

This list presents the full set of buildings, structures, objects, sites, or districts designated on the National Register of Historic Places in Yamhill County, Oregon, United States, and offers brief descriptive information about each of them. The National Register recognizes places of national, state, or local historic significance across the United States. Out of over 90,000 National Register sites nationwide, Oregon is home to over 2,000, and 86 of those are found in Yamhill County.

This National Park Service list is complete through NPS recent listings posted July 31, 2026.

== Current listings ==
	Name on the Register	Image	Date listed	Location	City or town	Description
1	99W Drive-in Theatre	99W Drive-in Theatre	July 11, 2014 (#14000401)	3110 Portland Road; 45°18′17″N 122°56′53″W	Newberg	
2	Avery House	Avery House	March 16, 1987 (#87000329)	403 Church St. 45°13′17″N 123°04′45″W	Dayton	
3	Baxter House	Baxter House	March 16, 1987 (#87000331)	407 Church St. 45°13′17″N 123°04′46″W	Dayton	
4	Berry–Sigler Investment Property	Berry–Sigler Investment Property	August 3, 1987 (#87000368)	700 Church St. 45°13′07″N 123°05′00″W	Dayton	
5	Henry Bertram, Sr. House	Henry Bertram, Sr. House	February 29, 1988 (#88000080)	6160 SE Webfoot Rd. 45°12′51″N 123°05′10″W	Dayton	
6	Briedwell School	Briedwell School	July 28, 1988 (#88001156)	11935 SW Bellevue Hwy. 45°06′48″N 123°14′16″W	Amity	Built in 1895, this is the most intact and architecturally sophisticated of the few remaining one-room schoolhouses in Yamhill County. It served students in kindergarten through 8th grade until it closed in 1957, and has since been converted into a house. It is the sole remnant of the former railroad town of Briedwell.
7	Brookside Cemetery	Brookside Cemetery	March 16, 1987 (#87000332)	South end of 3rd St. 45°13′06″N 123°04′24″W	Dayton	
8	Buchanan Cellers Mill	Buchanan Cellers Mill	January 27, 2012 (#11001065)	855 NE 5th St. 45°12′42″N 123°11′23″W	McMinnville	
9	John Marion Bunn House	John Marion Bunn House	October 16, 1979 (#79002152)	285 W 3rd St. 45°20′21″N 123°11′25″W	Yamhill	
10	Cain House	Cain House	March 16, 1987 (#87000333)	208 Alder St. 45°13′13″N 123°04′26″W	Dayton	Has been demolished.
11	Cameo Theatre	Cameo Theatre	October 22, 2018 (#100003055)	304 E. 1st St. 45°18′00″N 122°58′36″W	Newberg	
12	Carlton State and Savings Bank	Carlton State and Savings Bank	February 11, 1988 (#88000082)	109 W. Main St. 45°17′40″N 123°10′38″W	Carlton	
13	Carter–Goodrich House	Carter–Goodrich House	March 16, 1987 (#87000334)	521 Church St. 45°13′16″N 123°04′48″W	Dayton	
14	Asa F. Cate Farm Ensemble	Asa F. Cate Farm Ensemble	February 23, 1990 (#90000285)	16900 NW Baker Creek Rd. 45°13′52″N 123°17′19″W	McMinnville	
15	Joseph and Virginia Chambers Farmstead	Joseph and Virginia Chambers Farmstead	March 5, 1992 (#92000136)	30295 Highway 99W; 45°18′48″N 122°55′39″W	Newberg	
16	Commercial Club – S. C. Stuckey Building	Commercial Club – S. C. Stuckey Building	March 16, 1987 (#87000335)	304 Ferry St. 45°13′14″N 123°04′33″W	Dayton	
17	Amos Cook House	Amos Cook House	December 31, 1974 (#74001726)	NW of Dayton on OR 233; 45°14′13″N 123°06′55″W	Dayton	
18	Courthouse Square	Courthouse Square	March 16, 1987 (#87000336)	Bounded by 3rd, 4th, Ferry, and Main Sts. 45°13′15″N 123°04′36″W	Dayton	
19	Dayton Common School	Dayton Common School	March 16, 1987 (#87000338)	504 4th St. 45°13′11″N 123°04′35″W	Dayton	Demolished
20	Dayton High School	Dayton High School	March 16, 1987 (#87000339)	801 Ferry St. 45°12′59″N 123°05′04″W	Dayton	
21	Dayton Methodist Episcopal Church	Dayton Methodist Episcopal Church	March 16, 1987 (#87000340)	302 4th St. 45°13′17″N 123°04′42″W	Dayton	
22	Diehl–Seitters House	Diehl–Seitters House	March 16, 1987 (#87000344)	527 Church St. 45°13′14″N 123°04′50″W	Dayton	Has been demolished.
23	Dundee Woman's Club Hall	Dundee Woman's Club Hall	June 5, 1986 (#86001241)	1026 OR 99W; 45°16′31″N 123°00′49″W	Dundee	Also known as the Dundee Community Center
24	Jesse Edwards House	Jesse Edwards House	August 25, 1980 (#80003393)	402 S. College St. 45°17′51″N 122°58′21″W	Newberg	
25	Evangelical Church of Lafayette	Evangelical Church of Lafayette	October 31, 2002 (#02001278)	605 Market St. 45°14′45″N 123°06′45″W	Lafayette	
26	Evangelical United Brethren Church	Evangelical United Brethren Church	August 3, 1987 (#87000346)	302 5th St. 45°13′15″N 123°04′46″W	Dayton	
27	Frank W. Fenton House	Frank W. Fenton House	September 1, 1983 (#83002180)	434 NE Evans St. 45°12′40″N 123°11′39″W	McMinnville	
28	Fernwood Pioneer Cemetery	Fernwood Pioneer Cemetery	August 5, 1994 (#94000809)	Everest Rd., 0.5 miles (0.80 km) south of the junction with OR 219; 45°17′41″N 122°57′37″W	Newberg	
29	First Baptist Church	First Baptist Church	October 16, 1979 (#79002151)	3rd and Main Sts. 45°13′18″N 123°04′36″W	Dayton	
30	Carl Fischer Meats	Carl Fischer Meats	March 16, 1987 (#87000348)	400 Ferry St. 45°13′12″N 123°04′36″W	Dayton	
31	Alfred P. Fletcher Farmhouse	Alfred P. Fletcher Farmhouse	August 25, 1980 (#80003392)	1007 3rd St. 45°14′32″N 123°06′27″W	Lafayette	
32	Francis Fletcher House	Francis Fletcher House	October 29, 1975 (#75001601)	W of Dayton off OR 18; 45°13′26″N 123°06′29″W	Dayton vicinity	
33	Fletcher–Stretch House	Fletcher–Stretch House	March 16, 1987 (#87000349)	401 Oak St. 45°13′21″N 123°04′46″W	Dayton	
34	Foster Oil Company	Foster Oil Company	March 16, 1987 (#87000356)	216 Ferry St. 45°13′15″N 123°04′31″W	Dayton	
35	Free Methodist Church	Free Methodist Church	March 16, 1987 (#87000357)	411 Oak St. 45°13′19″N 123°04′49″W	Dayton	
36	Gabriel–Filer House	Gabriel–Filer House	March 16, 1987 (#87000358)	525 Church St. 45°13′15″N 123°04′49″W	Dayton	
37	Gabriel–Will House	Gabriel–Will House	March 16, 1987 (#87000359)	401 3rd St. 45°13′17″N 123°04′33″W	Dayton	
38	Levi Hagey House	Levi Hagey House	December 19, 1974 (#74001727)	Off OR 99W; 45°17′02″N 123°00′14″W	Dundee	
39	Harrington House	Harrington House	March 16, 1987 (#87000360)	212 Mill St. 45°13′10″N 123°04′25″W	Dayton	
40	Harris Building	Harris Building	March 16, 1987 (#87000363)	302 Ferry St. 45°13′14″N 123°04′32″W	Dayton	
41	William Hibbert House	William Hibbert House	November 30, 1978 (#78002329)	426 5th St. 45°13′11″N 123°04′42″W	Dayton	
42	Hole House	Hole House	March 16, 1987 (#87000367)	623 Ferry St. 45°13′04″N 123°04′54″W	Dayton	
43	Hughes Flying Boat (H-4 Hercules)	Hughes Flying Boat (H-4 Hercules)	October 15, 2024 (#100009992)	500 E Captain Michael King Smith; 45°12′15″N 123°08′48″W	McMinnville	Originally listed in 1980 in California
44	J. C. Penney Building	J. C. Penney Building	June 13, 2007 (#07000555)	516 E. 1st St. 45°18′00″N 122°58′27″W	Newberg	
45	Jessen–Goodrich House	Jessen–Goodrich House	March 16, 1987 (#87000370)	324 6th St. 45°13′10″N 123°04′53″W	Dayton	
46	James M. and Paul R. Kelty House	James M. and Paul R. Kelty House	September 23, 1982 (#82003756)	675 3rd St. 45°14′35″N 123°06′41″W	Lafayette	
47	Dr. Andrew Kershaw House	Dr. Andrew Kershaw House	March 2, 1989 (#89000122)	472 E. Main St. 45°04′49″N 123°28′54″W	Willamina	
48	Krietz House	Krietz House	March 16, 1987 (#87000372)	627 Church St. 45°13′10″N 123°04′58″W	Dayton	
49	Lamson Ranch	Lamson Ranch	July 9, 2013 (#13000483)	37845 SW Dent Road; 45°04′49″N 123°30′18″W	Willamina vicinity	
50	Lee Laughlin House	Lee Laughlin House	March 26, 1979 (#79002153)	100 S. Laurel St. 45°20′29″N 123°11′12″W	Yamhill	
51	Lewis–Shippy House	Lewis–Shippy House	March 16, 1987 (#87000373)	421 6th St. 45°13′08″N 123°04′49″W	Dayton	
52	Gottlieb Londershausen House	Gottlieb Londershausen House	March 16, 1987 (#87000383)	402 Main St. 45°13′14″N 123°04′40″W	Dayton	
53	Paul Londershausen House	Paul Londershausen House	March 16, 1987 (#87000384)	309 Main St. 45°13′16″N 123°04′39″W	Dayton	
54	Mabee–Mayberry House	Mabee–Mayberry House	August 3, 1987 (#87000385)	309 7th St. 45°13′07″N 123°04′58″W	Dayton	
55	Joseph Mattey House	Joseph Mattey House	February 15, 1977 (#77001118)	W of Lafayette at jct. of Mattey Lane and Rutherford Rd. 45°14′44″N 123°07′58″W	Lafayette	
56	McMinnville Downtown Historic District	McMinnville Downtown Historic District	September 14, 1987 (#87001366)	Bounded by 5th St., Southern Pacific RR tracks, 2nd, and N. Adams Sts. 45°12′36″N 123°11′41″W	McMinnville	
57	McNamar Building	McNamar Building	March 16, 1987 (#87000386)	310–312 Ferry St. 45°13′13″N 123°04′34″W	Dayton	
58	McNish House	McNish House	March 16, 1987 (#87000388)	1005 Ferry St. 45°12′52″N 123°05′21″W	Dayton	Building no longer exists.
59	Mellinger House	Mellinger House	March 16, 1987 (#87000389)	414 5th St. 45°13′12″N 123°04′43″W	Dayton	
60	Mellinger–Ponnay House	Mellinger–Ponnay House	August 3, 1987 (#87000390)	102 Tribbett Court; 45°13′02″N 123°04′11″W	Dayton	
61	Methodist Episcopal Parsonage	Methodist Episcopal Parsonage	August 3, 1987 (#87000393)	202 4th St. 45°13′19″N 123°04′44″W	Dayton	
62	Minthorn Hall	Minthorn Hall	June 13, 1997 (#97000581)	North St. on the George Fox University Campus; 45°18′14″N 122°58′05″W	Newberg	
63	Dr. Henry J. Minthorn House (Herbert Hoover House)	Dr. Henry J. Minthorn House (Herbert Hoover House)	December 19, 2003 (#75001602)	115 S. River St. 45°17′59″N 122°58′08″W	Newberg	
64	Monahan House	Monahan House	March 16, 1987 (#87000395)	120 5th St. 45°13′19″N 123°04′51″W	Dayton	
65	Morse House	Morse House	March 16, 1987 (#87000398)	409 Oak St. 45°13′20″N 123°04′48″W	Dayton	
66	Morse House	Morse House	March 16, 1987 (#87000396)	101 5th St. 45°13′21″N 123°04′51″W	Dayton	
67	Nichols House	Nichols House	March 16, 1987 (#87000400)	303 Main St. 45°13′18″N 123°04′37″W	Dayton	Building no longer exists.
68	Oregon Mutual Merchant Fire Insurance Association Office	Oregon Mutual Merchant Fire Insurance Association Office	March 16, 1987 (#87000402)	308 Ferry St. 45°13′13″N 123°04′34″W	Dayton	
69	Palmer House	Palmer House	March 16, 1987 (#87000403)	600 Ferry St. 45°13′05″N 123°04′47″W	Dayton	
70	William Albert and Anna May Bristow Parrish Farmstead	William Albert and Anna May Bristow Parrish Farmstead	July 17, 2000 (#00000803)	30280 NE Wilsonville Rd. 45°17′18″N 122°55′36″W	Newberg	
71	Paulson–Gregory House	Paulson–Gregory House	March 18, 1999 (#99000355)	509 S. College St. 45°17′47″N 122°58′23″W	Newberg	
72	Pioneer Hall, Linfield College	Pioneer Hall, Linfield College	February 23, 1978 (#78002330)	Linfield College campus 45°12′05″N 123°11′57″W	McMinnville	
73	Curtis W. Powell House	Curtis W. Powell House	March 16, 1987 (#87000404)	524 Ash St. 45°13′19″N 123°04′54″W	Dayton	
74	Rippey House	Rippey House	March 16, 1987 (#87000405)	523 Ash St. 45°13′20″N 123°04′55″W	Dayton	
75	Sigler House	Sigler House	March 16, 1987 (#87000406)	521 Ferry St. 45°13′09″N 123°04′44″W	Dayton	
76	Andrew Smith House	Andrew Smith House	June 23, 1976 (#76001591)	308 5th St. 45°13′13″N 123°04′45″W	Dayton	
77	John T. Smith House	John T. Smith House	November 15, 1984 (#84000493)	414 N. College St. 45°18′12″N 122°58′21″W	Newberg	
78	Charles K. Spaulding House	Charles K. Spaulding House	August 26, 1994 (#94001022)	717 E. Sheridan St. 45°18′08″N 122°58′19″W	Newberg	Home of timber industry businessman Charles K. Spaulding
79	Jack Spence House	Jack Spence House	February 27, 1986 (#86000295)	536 NE 5th St. 45°12′40″N 123°11′37″W	McMinnville	
80	Dr. Stuart House	Dr. Stuart House	March 16, 1987 (#87000408)	103 Ferry St. 45°13′19″N 123°04′24″W	Dayton	
81	Lewis C. and Emma Thompson House	Lewis C. and Emma Thompson House	May 11, 2018 (#100000770)	12789 Meadowlake Road; 45°17′14″N 123°14′47″W	Carlton vicinity	
82	Travelers Home	Travelers Home	July 8, 1982 (#82003757)	147 NE Yamhill St. 45°06′02″N 123°23′39″W	Sheridan	
83	Union Block	Union Block	May 5, 2000 (#00000450)	610–620 E. 1st St. 45°18′00″N 122°58′23″W	Newberg	
84	John B. Wennerberg Barn	John B. Wennerberg Barn	June 25, 2018 (#100002598)	501 S. Park St. 45°17′28″N 123°10′42″W	Carlton	
85	Yamhill River Lock and Dam	Yamhill River Lock and Dam	June 21, 1991 (#91000799)	Across the Yamhill River at the south terminus of Locks Rd. 45°13′50″N 123°06′16″W	Dayton	
86	Ewing Young Site	Ewing Young Site	November 26, 1989 (#89001977)	Address restricted	Newberg	Ewing Young Park sits on the homestead site.

== Former listings ==
	Name on the Register	Image	Date listed	Date removed	Location	City or town	Description
1	Dayton Auto and Transfer Company Building		March 16, 1987 (#87000337)	July 21, 1998	411 Ferry St.	Dayton	Collapsed on December 17, 1997.
2	Dayton Opera House		March 16, 1987 (#87000342)	July 21, 1998	318 Ferry St.	Dayton	Destroyed by fire on December 9, 1993.

== See also ==
- National Register of Historic Places listings in Oregon
- Listings in neighboring counties: Clackamas, Marion, Polk, Tillamook, Washington
- Historic preservation
- History of Oregon
- Lists of Oregon-related topics
