= Londershausen House =

Londershausen House may refer to:

- Gottlieb Londershausen House
- Paul Londershausen House
