= Lafayette, Oregon =

Town in Yamhill County, Oregon, U.S.

- City
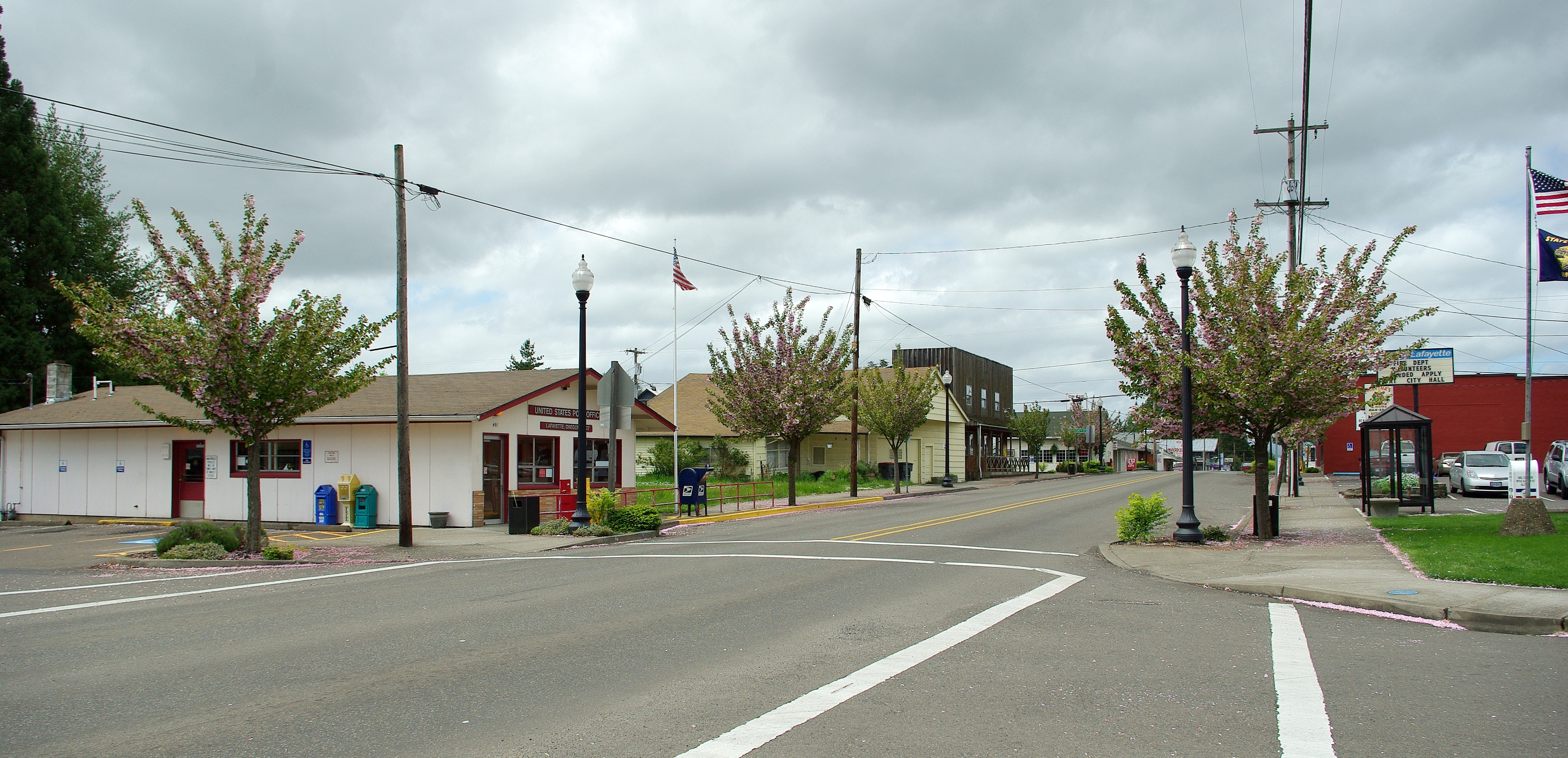
- 99W (3rd St) and Market St in downtown Lafayette

- Location in Oregon
- Coordinates: 45°14′49″N 123°06′48″W
- Country: United States
- State: Oregon
- County: Yamhill
- Founded: 1846
- Incorporated: 1878

Government
  - Type: Council-Manager
  - Mayor: Hilary Malcomson

Area
  - Total: 0.93 sq mi (2.40 km^{2})
  - Land: 0.93 sq mi (2.40 km^{2})
  - Water: 0 sq mi (0.00 km^{2})
- Elevation: 223 ft (68 m)

Population (2020)
  - Total: 4,423
  - Density: 4,777.6/sq mi (1,844.66/km^{2})
- Time zone: UTC-8 (Pacific)
  - Summer (DST): UTC-7 (Pacific)
- ZIP code: 97127
- Area code: 503
- FIPS code: 41-40300
- GNIS feature ID: 2411593
- Website: lafayetteoregon.gov
- Population density reflects year 2000 census figures.

Lafayette is a city in Yamhill County, Oregon, United States on the Yamhill River and Oregon Route 99W. It was founded in 1846 and incorporated in 1878. The population was 4,423 at the 2020 census.

== History ==
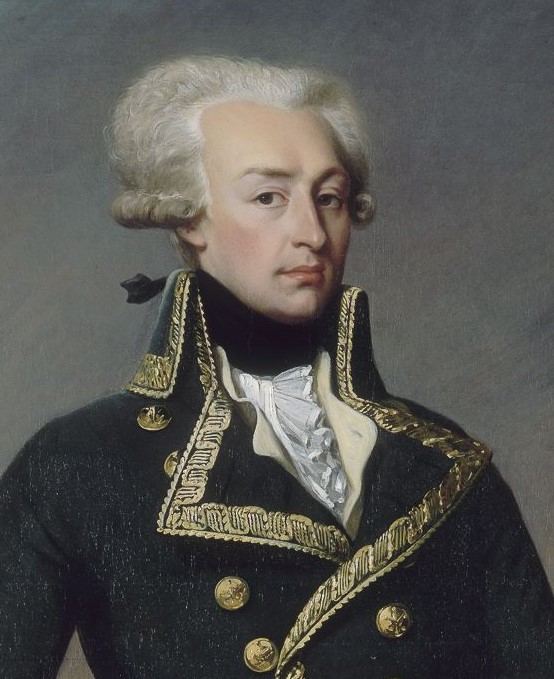
General Lafayette, 1792

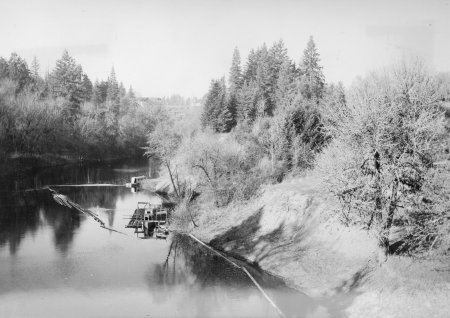
Lafayette steamboat landing, 1938

Lafayette was founded in 1846 by Joel Perkins, an American pioneer and entrepreneur, who had previously lived in Lafayette, Indiana and named the new settlement similarly after Marquis de Lafayette, a general involved in the American Revolutionary War.

The post office was established in 1851, and the city was incorporated by the Oregon Legislative Assembly on October 17, 1878.

Lafayette was the county seat of Yamhill County from its founding until 1889, when county residents voted to move the county seat to McMinnville.

== Geography ==
According to the United States Census Bureau, the city has a total area of 0.90 square miles (2.33 km^{2}), all of it land.

It is located on State Highway 99W between McMinnville and Dundee.

== Landmarks ==
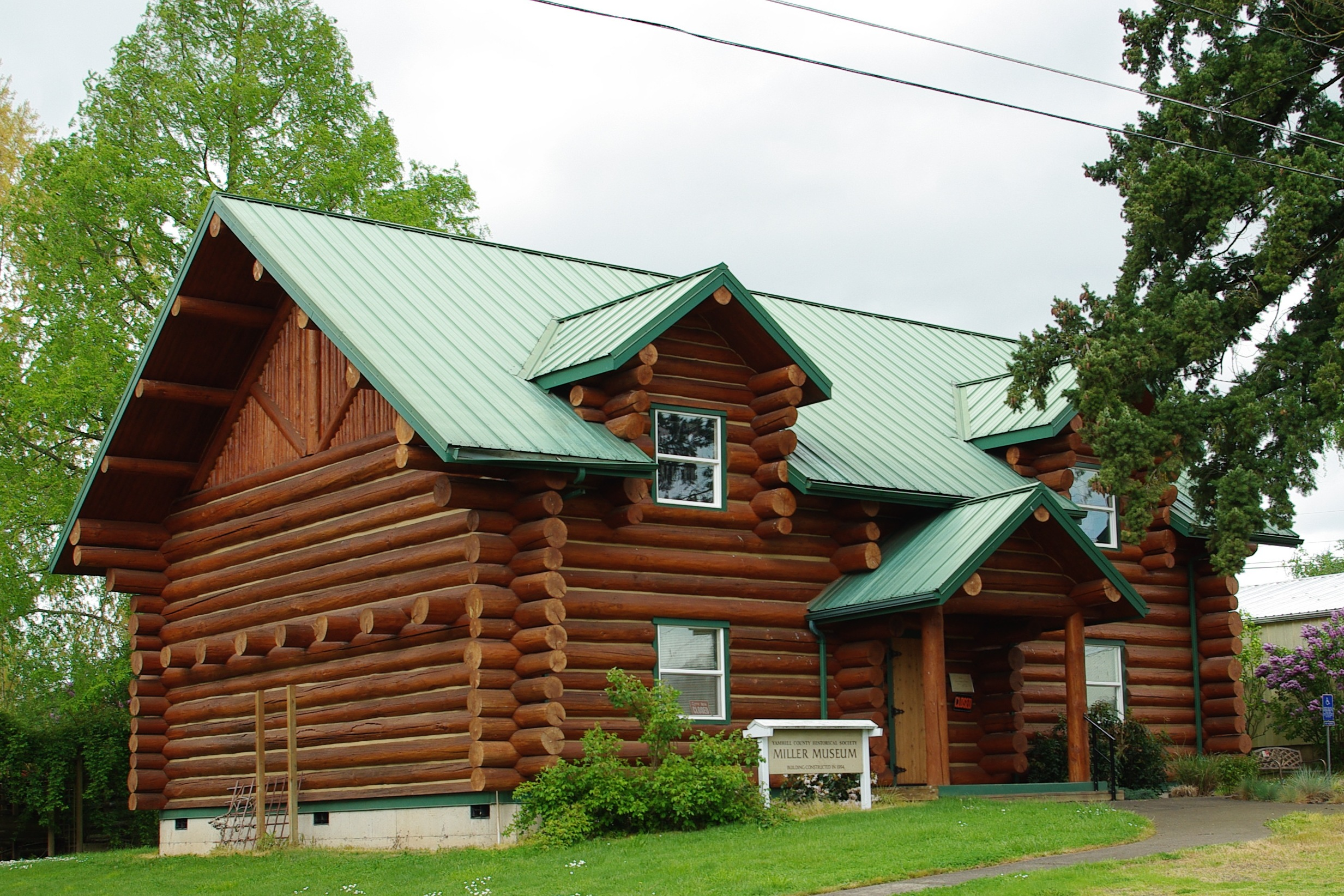
Yamhill County Museum

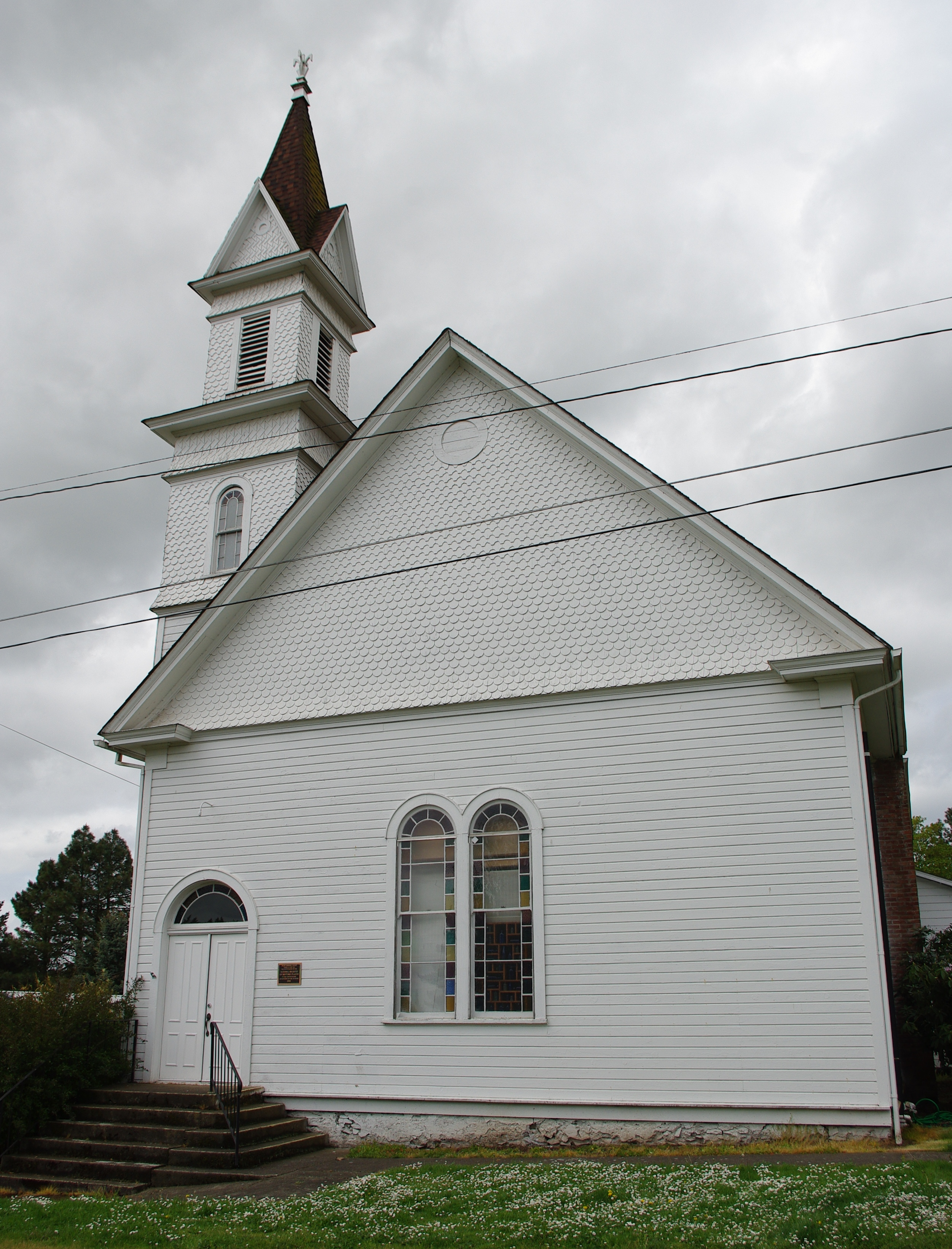
The Evangelical Church of Lafayette on Market St. is one of four sites listed on the National Register of Historic Places.

=== Lock and dam ===
In 1900, the Yamhill River lock and dam was completed about 1.5 miles (2.4 km) downriver from Lafayette, Oregon. The lock was decommissioned in 1954. The dam was deliberately destroyed in 1963 to allow better passage for salmon on the river. The site of the lock and dam is now a county park.

=== Parks ===
Parks in Lafayette include:

- Abigail Scott Duniway Park
- Commons Park
- Community Pride Park
- Joel Perkins Park
- Plantation Park
- Terry Park
- Veteran's Park

=== Other locations ===
- Lafayette Pioneer Cemetery
- Alfred P. Fletcher Farmhouse
- Evangelical Church of Lafayette (listed on the National Register of Historic Places)
- James M. and Paul R. Kelty House
- Joseph Mattey House
- Wascher Elementary School
- Yamhill County Museum

== Demographics ==
Historical population
| Census | Pop. | Note | %± |
|---|---|---|---|
| 1880 | 396 | | — |
| 1890 | 365 | | −7.8% |
| 1900 | 359 | | −1.6% |
| 1910 | 412 | | 14.8% |
| 1920 | 410 | | −0.5% |
| 1940 | 409 | | — |
| 1950 | 662 | | 61.9% |
| 1960 | 553 | | −16.5% |
| 1970 | 786 | | 42.1% |
| 1980 | 1,215 | | 54.6% |
| 1990 | 1,292 | | 6.3% |
| 2000 | 2,586 | | 100.2% |
| 2010 | 3,742 | | 44.7% |
| 2020 | 4,423 | | 18.2% |
U.S. Decennial Census

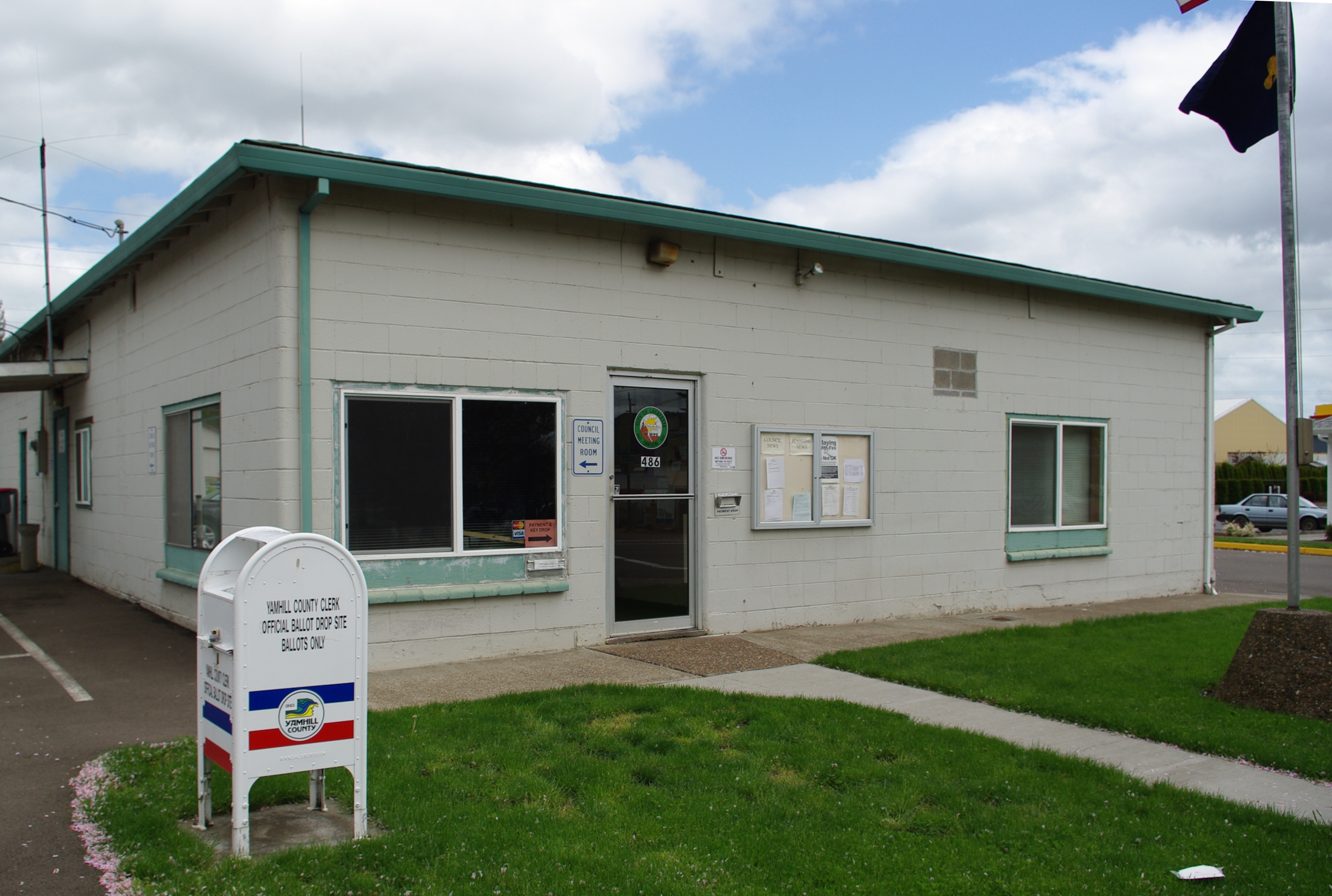
Lafayette City Hall

=== 2020 census ===
As of the 2020 census, Lafayette had a population of 4,423. The median age was 33.6 years. 28.1% of residents were under the age of 18 and 11.5% of residents were 65 years of age or older. For every 100 females there were 100.3 males, and for every 100 females age 18 and over there were 99.4 males age 18 and over.

100.0% of residents lived in urban areas, while 0% lived in rural areas.

There were 1,424 households in Lafayette, of which 42.9% had children under the age of 18 living in them. Of all households, 59.1% were married-couple households, 13.9% were households with a male householder and no spouse or partner present, and 17.7% were households with a female householder and no spouse or partner present. About 14.8% of all households were made up of individuals and 6.0% had someone living alone who was 65 years of age or older.

There were 1,455 housing units, of which 2.1% were vacant. Among occupied housing units, 84.0% were owner-occupied and 16.0% were renter-occupied. The homeowner vacancy rate was 0.6% and the rental vacancy rate was 4.2%.

Racial composition as of the 2020 census
| Race | Number | Percent |
|---|---|---|
| White | 3,112 | 70.4% |
| Black or African American | 13 | 0.3% |
| American Indian and Alaska Native | 114 | 2.6% |
| Asian | 52 | 1.2% |
| Native Hawaiian and Other Pacific Islander | 17 | 0.4% |
| Some other race | 563 | 12.7% |
| Two or more races | 552 | 12.5% |
| Hispanic or Latino (of any race) | 1,086 | 24.6% |

=== 2010 census ===
As of the census of 2010, there were 3,742 people, 1,209 households, and 938 families living in the city. The population density was 4,157.8 inhabitants per square mile (1,605.3/km^{2}). There were 1,315 housing units at an average density of 1,461.1 per square mile (564.1/km^{2}). The racial makeup of the city was 84.6% White, 0.3% African American, 0.9% Native American, 0.7% Asian, 9.8% from other races, and 3.6% from two or more races. Hispanic or Latino of any race were 22.0% of the population.

There were 1,209 households, of which 47.5% had children under the age of 18 living with them, 60.2% were married couples living together, 11.0% had a female householder with no husband present, 6.4% had a male householder with no wife present, and 22.4% were non-families. 15.6% of all households were made up of individuals, and 4.5% had someone living alone who was 65 years of age or older. The average household size was 3.10 and the average family size was 3.45.

The median age in the city was 33.2 years. 32.1% of residents were under the age of 18; 6.2% were between the ages of 18 and 24; 30.9% were from 25 to 44; 22.6% were from 45 to 64; and 8% were 65 years of age or older. The gender makeup of the city was 51.3% male and 48.7% female.

=== 2000 census ===
In the census of 2000, there were 2,586 people, 841 households, and 656 families living in the city. The population density was 2,869.9 inhabitants per square mile (1,108.1/km^{2}). There were 888 housing units at an average density of 985.5 per square mile (380.5/km^{2}). The racial makeup of the city was 85.89% White, 0.43% African American, 1.62% Native American, 0.62% Asian, 0.23% Pacific Islander, 8.35% from other races, and 2.86% from two or more races. Hispanic or Latino of any race were 20.22% of the population.

There were 841 households, out of which 44.0% had children under the age of 18 living with them, 62.3% were married couples living together, 11.3% had a female householder with no husband present, and 21.9% were non-families. 16.6% of all households were made up of individuals, and 4.8% had someone living alone who was 65 years of age or older. The average household size was 3.07 and the average family size was 3.43.

In the city, the population was spread out, with 32.7% under the age of 18, 8.8% from 18 to 24, 33.4% from 25 to 44, 17.3% from 45 to 64, and 7.8% who were 65 years of age or older. The median age was 31 years. For every 100 females, there were 101.7 males. For every 100 females age 18 and over, there were 101.2 males.

The median income for a household in the city was $38,611, and the median income for a family was $41,283. Males had a median income of $31,351 versus $22,466 for females. The per capita income for the city was $14,542. About 10.7% of families and 13.0% of the population were below the poverty line, including 17.1% of those under age 18 and 6.8% of those age 65 or over.

== Folklore ==
The most common myth that takes place in this town is the myth of the witch of Lafayette. In the 1800s, a woman was accused of witchcraft and hanged. According to the legend, this woman now haunts the Lafayette Pioneer Cemetery. People sometimes report hearing unexplained laughter there.

== Notable people ==
- Pauline Alderman (1893–1983), musicologist and composer
- Stan Bunn (born 1946), politician
- Matthew Deady (1824–1893), judge
- Bert E. Haney (1789–1943), judge on the U.S. Court of Appeals for the Ninth Circuit
- Anson G. Henry (1804–1865), Lafayette-area physician, deputy surveyor of Yamhill County, surveyor general of Washington Territory, and lifelong friend and physician of Abraham Lincoln
- George W. McBride, member of Oregon Legislative Assembly and Speaker of the House, Oregon Secretary of State, and U.S. Senator from Oregon
- James McBride, politician and diplomat
- John R. McBride (1832–1904), politician
- Thomas A. McBride (1847–1930), judge
- William Marion Ramsey (1846–1937), judge

== See also ==
- List of places named for the Marquis de Lafayette
- National Register of Historic Places listings in Yamhill County, Oregon
