= Dayton Opera House =

Building in Dayton, Oregon, U.S.

Coordinates: 45.2201°N 123.0763°W

- Formerly listed on the U.S. National Register of Historic Places
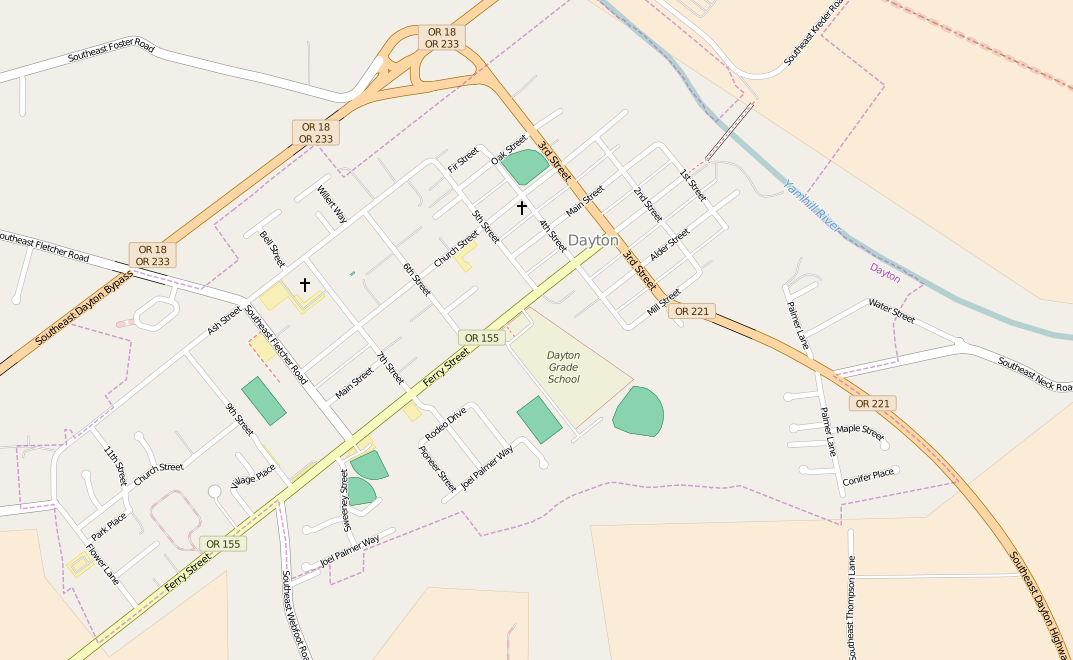
- Location within Dayton OR
- Location: 318 Ferry St., Dayton, Oregon, U.S.
- Area: less than one acre
- Built: 1908
- Architectural style: Commercial style
- MPS: Dayton MRA
- NRHP reference No.: 87000342

Significant dates
- Added to NRHP: March 16, 1987
- Removed from NRHP: July 21, 1998

The Dayton Opera House was an historic opera house located at 318 Ferry Street in Dayton, Oregon, United States. It was added to the National Register of Historic Places on March 16, 1987. It was destroyed by a fire on December 9, 1993., and was subsequently delisted on July 21, 1998.

== See also ==
- National Register of Historic Places listings in Yamhill County, Oregon
