= Ash Island (Oregon) =

Location on the Willamette River, Oregon, USA

Coordinates: 45°16′21″N 122°59′02″W

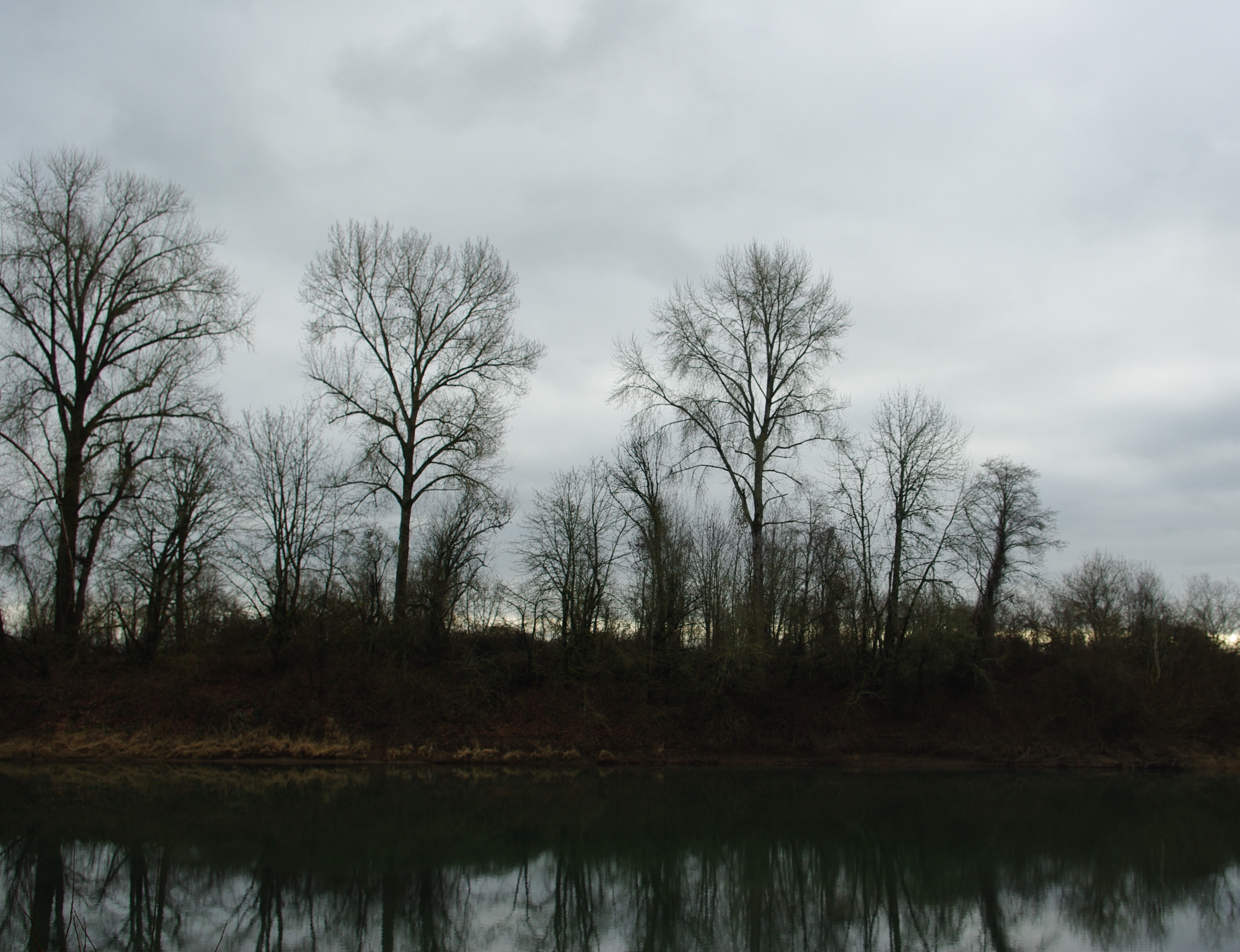
Ash Island from Dundee

Ash Island is an uninhabited 137-acre (55 ha) island at river mile 52 on the Willamette River, in Yamhill County, Oregon, United States, near Dundee. The island is accessible by boat year-round from any nearby Willamette River landing. A private ferry carries agricultural equipment and workers to the island from Marion County, on the other side of the river.

== Geography ==
Most of Ash Island is covered in sandy fields and, on the shores and southern end, forest. The elevation of the island ranges from around 50 feet (15 m) at the shoreline to around 80 feet (24 m) at the highest point. There is a wooden dam located at the south end of the channel on the left side of the island.

== History ==
In 1950, a National Oceanic and Atmospheric Administration (NOAA) water level station ran from April 3 to April 13.

Today, Ash Island is primarily used for farming.

== Wildlife ==
The island is home to a number of animals, including deer, fox, geese, ducks and bald eagles. The nearby river is a popular fishing spot for salmon, steelhead and bass.

== Current status ==
In January 2007, Ash Island was being considered as site for Dundee to discharge its wastewater. This use could affect the island's ecosystem, however, Ash Island is also being considered for a new state park by the Oregon Parks and Recreation Department.
