= Dayton Methodist Episcopal Church =

Church in Dayton, Oregon, U.S.

- U.S. National Register of Historic Places
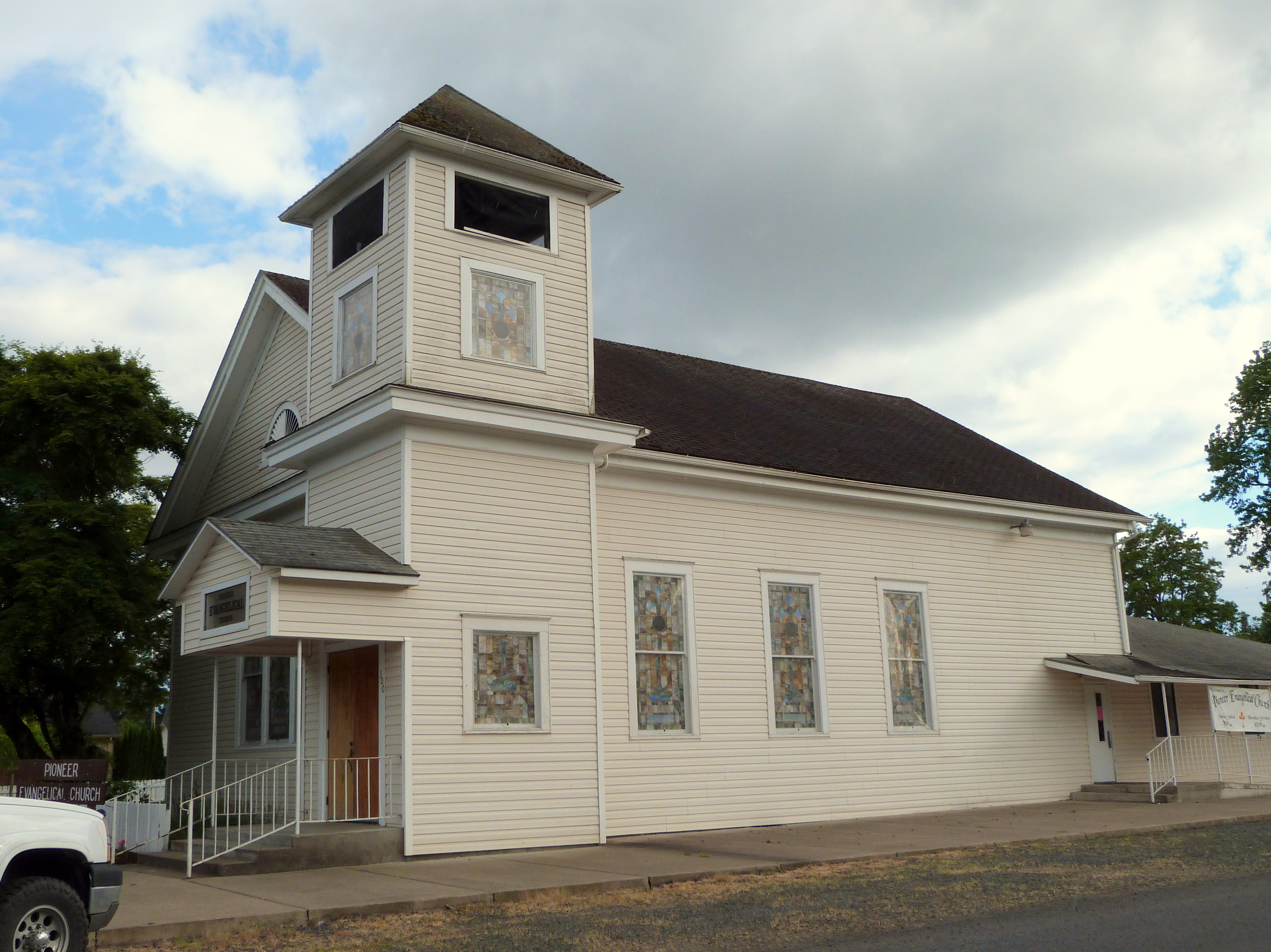
- The Dayton Methodist Episcopal Church in 2014

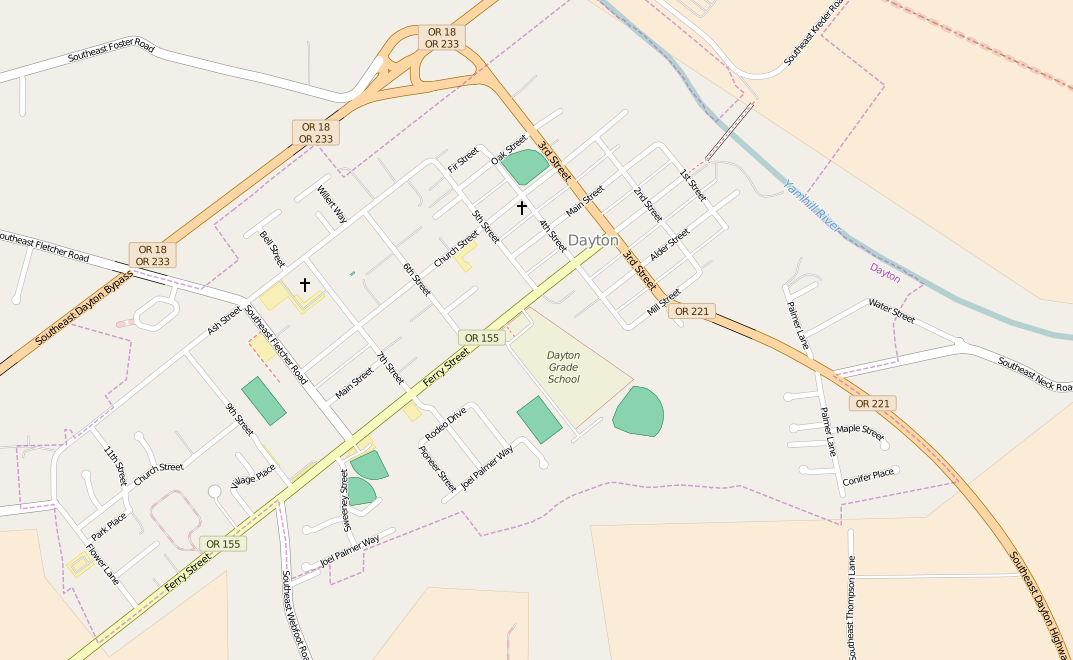
- Location within Dayton OR
- Location: 302 4th Street; Dayton, Oregon
- Coordinates: 45°13′17″N 123°04′42″W
- Area: Less than 1 acre (0.40 ha)
- Built: 1860–1862 remodeled 1912
- Built by: Jacob Smith (original)
- Architectural style: Classical Revival (original); Colonial Revival (1912 remodel)
- MPS: Dayton MRA
- NRHP reference No.: 87000340
- Added to NRHP: March 16, 1987

The Dayton Methodist Episcopal Church, known by 1984 as the Pioneer Evangelical Church, is a historic church building in Dayton, Oregon, United States.

The church was listed on the National Register of Historic Places in 1987.

== See also ==
- National Register of Historic Places listings in Yamhill County, Oregon
