= Dundee Woman's Club =

Historic women's club in Oregon

Dundee Women's Club
- Motto: Unity & Service; Colors: Blue & Gold

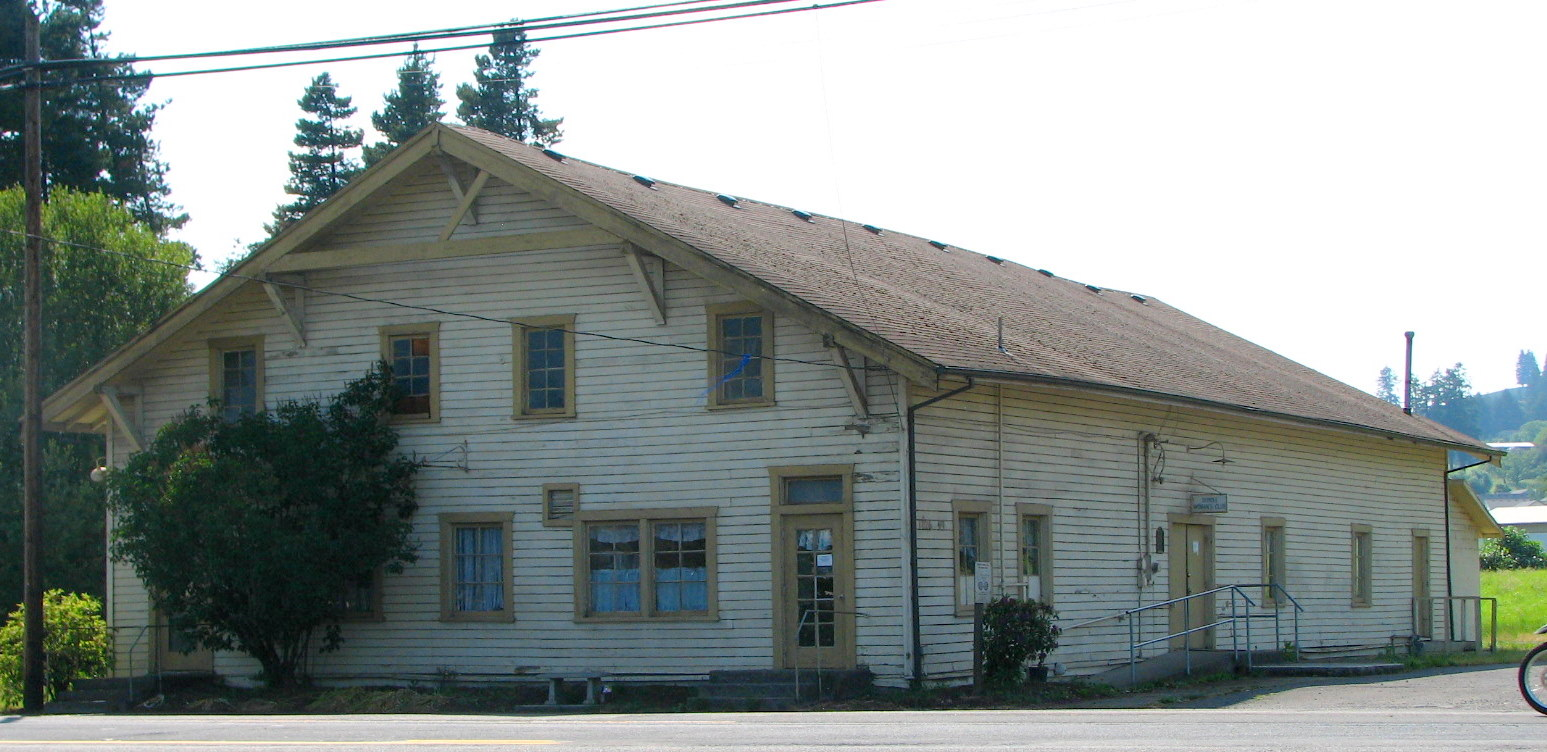
- The front entrance in 2009, prior to restoration

- Location within Oregon Location within the United States
- Formation: 1913
- Type: Women's club
- Headquarters: Dundee Community Center
- Coordinates: 45°16′31″N 123°00′48″W
- Region served: Yamhill County, Oregon
- Website: dundeecommunitycenter.com
- Formerly called: Neighborhood Circle
- Dundee Woman's Club Hall
- U.S. National Register of Historic Places
- Built: 1915
- Architect: James Bryson Moore
- Architectural style: American Craftsman
- NRHP reference No.: 86001241
- Added to NRHP: June 5, 1986

The Dundee Woman's Club is a women's club in Dundee, Oregon. Their clubhouse building is known as the Dundee Community Center.

== History ==
The group was founded in 1913 as the "Neighborhood Circle" in what was then an agricultural area. They built their clubhouse in 1915 for $3,500 where they opened town's first public library, hosted local Girl Scout and Boy Scout troops, held musical theater events, and served as a polling place. The Dundee High School played basketball games and held graduations in their facility. Civic clubs without their own building met upstairs including the Woodsmen of the World, Dundee Commercial Club, Dundee Men's Booster Club, and Neighbors of Woodcraft.

In 1964, a chimney fire damaged the building and the original stage was never rebuilt. In 2007, they established the Dundee Garden Club in order to attract younger members. In 2008, the group began a building restoration project in anticipation of their centennial in 1915. In 2014, the group started a Community Clothes Closet, selling all clothing items for a dollar to help needy members of the community. Today, the venue is rented for weddings, birthdays and funerals and hosts a Sunday church service.

== Architecture ==
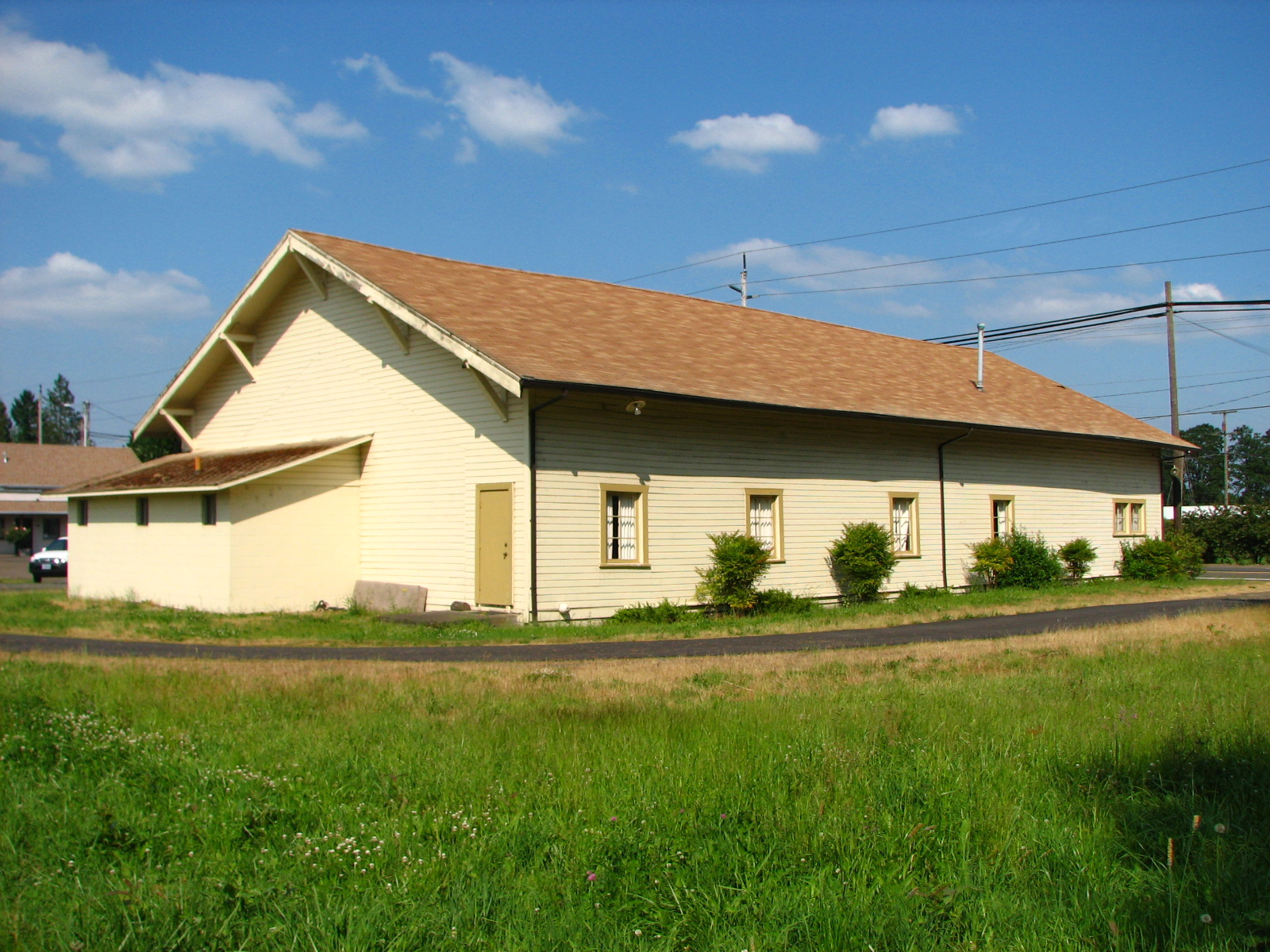
The rear with shed and triangular knee braces under the eaves

Portland architect James Bryson Moore designed the 1 1/2-story structure in an American Craftsman style. The 1915 building was added to the National Register of Historic Places in 1986.

The building exterior is covered in shiplap siding over a balloon frame. The roof is low with a double pitch and overhanging eves with exposed rafters while the gable ends have triangular knee braces. The front of the building has five bays with two doors on the outermost bays. The doors and windows have beveled architraves. The rear now has a one-story shed addition that replaced the stage wing after the 1964 fire.

The interior first floor has a main assembly hall with a library room now used for small meetings and a kitchen. A dog-leg stairway leads to an upstairs meeting room. The main room has a trussed ceiling, but a false ceiling was added after the fire. The original beaded wainscot panelling still covers some walls, and the floors are wood panels.

== See also ==
- List of women's clubs
- National Register of Historic Places listings in Yamhill County, Oregon
