= Baxter House (Dayton, Oregon) =

Building in Dayton, Oregon, U.S.

- U.S. National Register of Historic Places
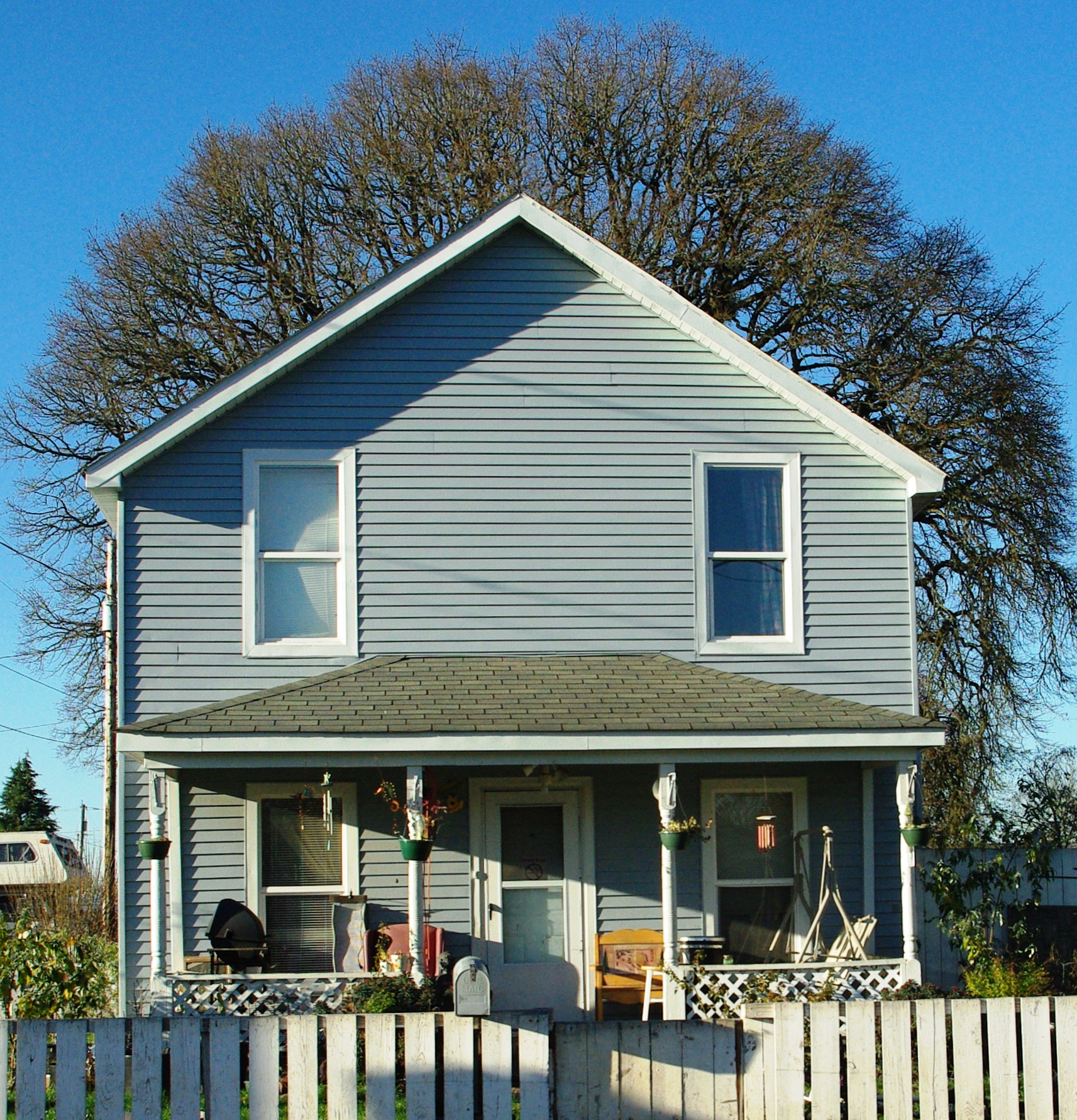
- The house's exterior in 2009

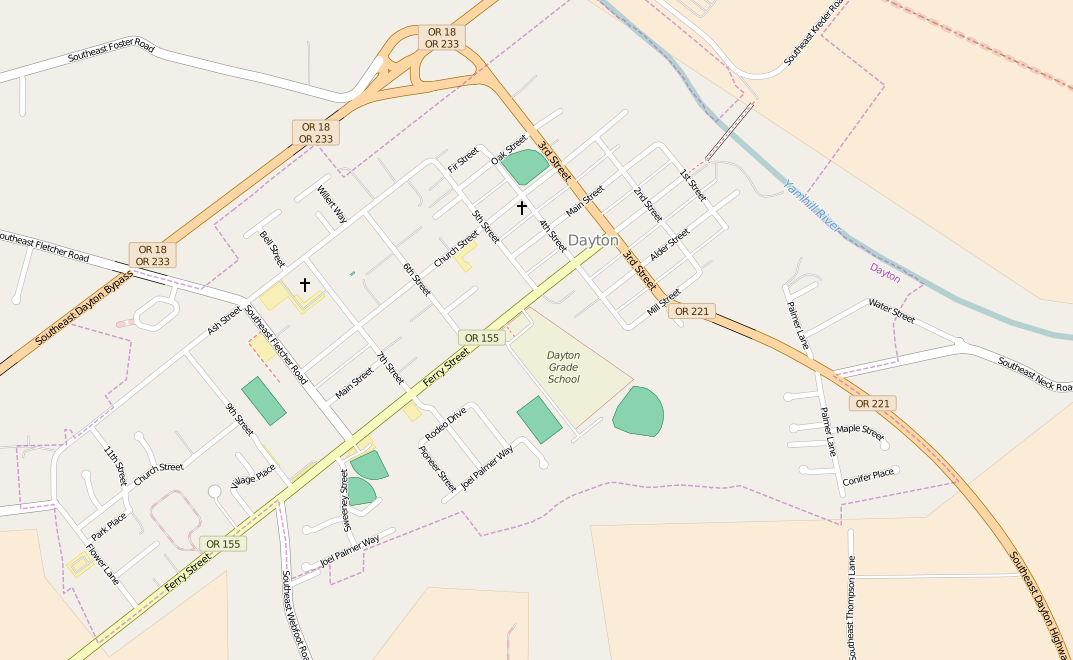
- Location within Dayton OR
- Location: 407 Church Street; Dayton, Oregon
- Coordinates: 45°13′17″N 123°04′46″W
- Built: 1890
- Architectural style: Vernacular
- MPS: Dayton MRA
- NRHP reference No.: 87000331
- Added to NRHP: March 16, 1987

The Baxter House, in Dayton, Oregon, also known as the Brewer Residence, was built in c. 1890. It was listed on the National Register of Historic Places in 1987.

It was the home of John Baxter (1814–1906) and his wife Harriet (1821–1908) who were both born in Ohio, lived in Wisconsin and Missouri, and moved to Oregon in the 1860s.

It is a 1 1/2-story house on a brick foundation. It has horizontal clapboard siding, a front porch with a hipped roof and turned supports, and a medium-pitched roof.

A Dayton Historic Resources Survey in 1984 assessed it as being "in good condition" and deemed it "significant as a vernacular interpretation of several architectural styles."

== See also ==
- National Register of Historic Places listings in Yamhill County, Oregon
