= Dr. Stuart House =

Building in Dayton, Oregon, U.S.

- U.S. National Register of Historic Places
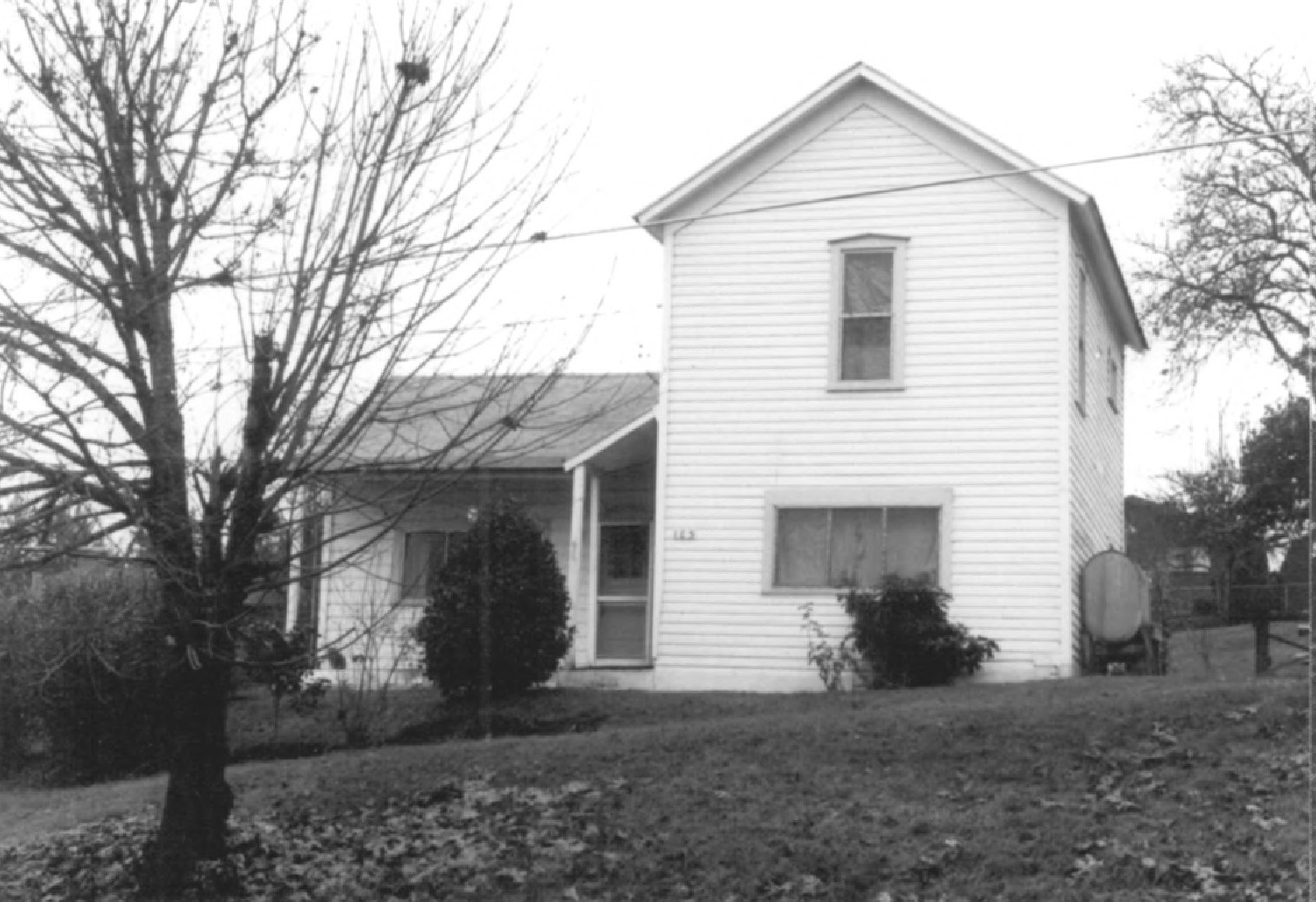
- The house circa 1984

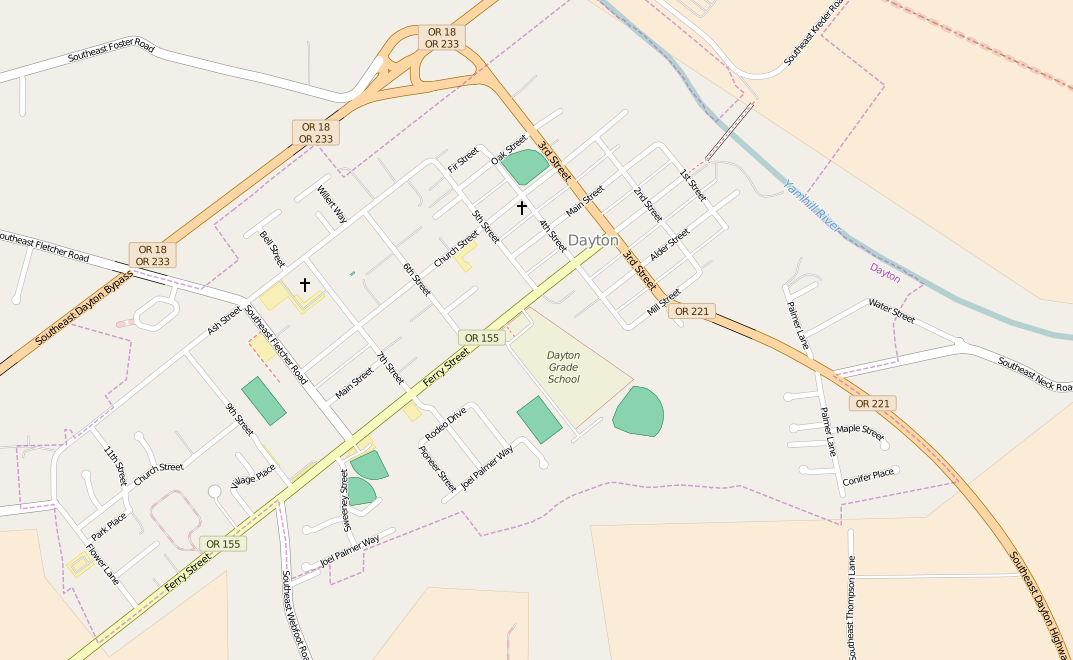
- Location within Dayton OR
- Location: 103 Ferry Street; Dayton, Oregon
- Coordinates: 45°13′19″N 123°04′24″W
- Built: 1887
- Architectural style: Gothic Revival
- MPS: Dayton MRA
- NRHP reference No.: 87000408
- Added to NRHP: March 16, 1987

The Dr. Stuart House, also known as Verduzco Residence, is a house built in 1887 in Dayton, Oregon. It was listed on the National Register of Historic Places in 1987. A new house was built on the site in 2008.
