= Free Methodist Church (Dayton, Oregon) =

Church in Dayton, Oregon, U.S.

- U.S. National Register of Historic Places
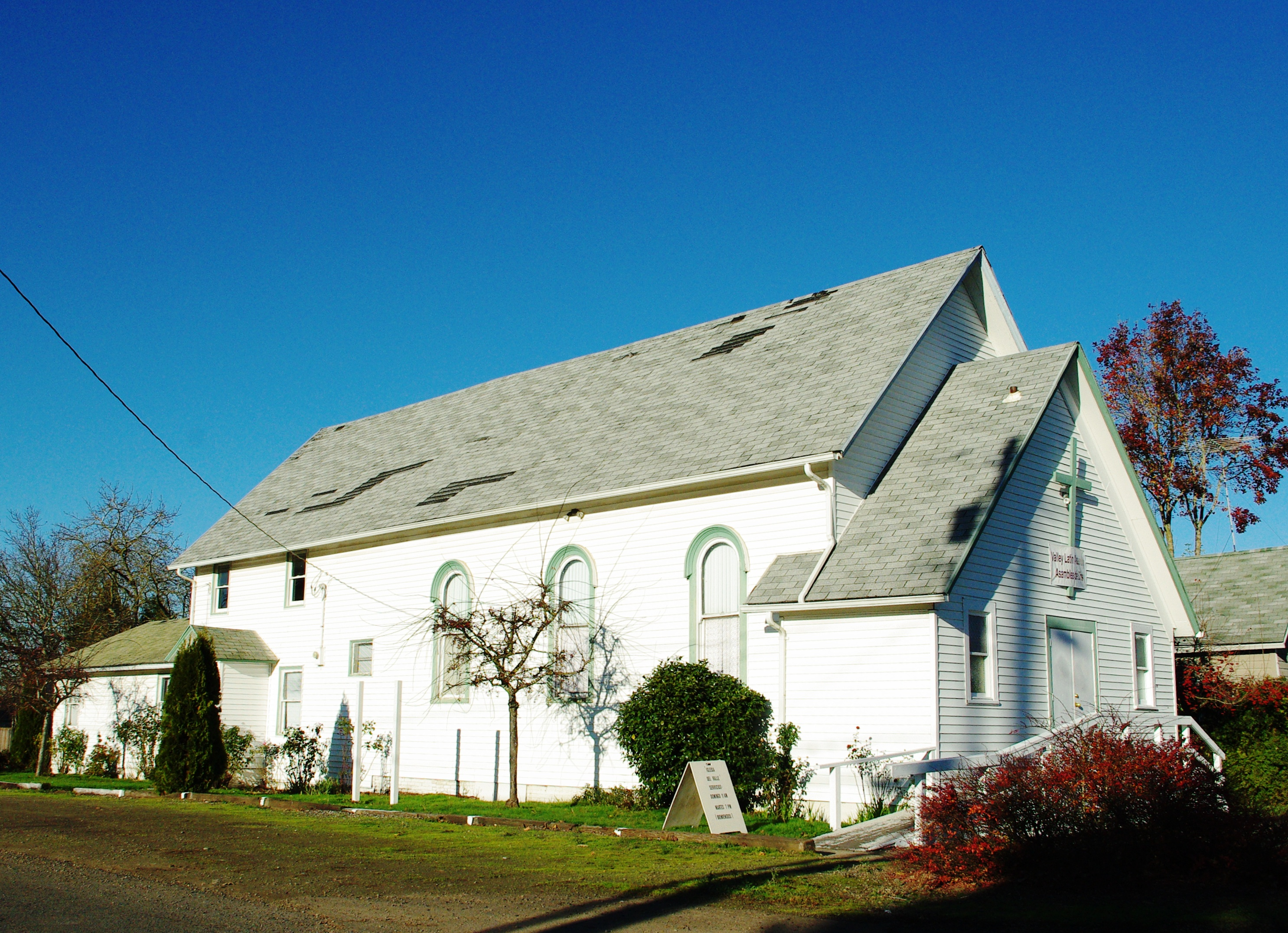
- Church in 2009

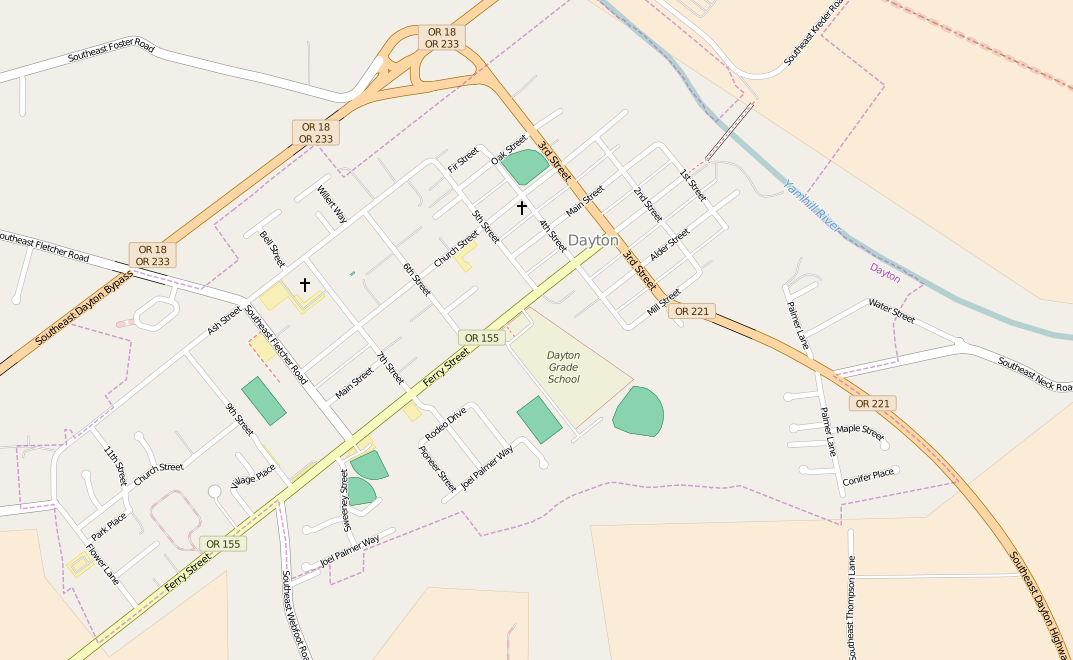
- Location within Dayton OR
- Location: 411 Oak Street; Dayton, Oregon
- Coordinates: 45°13′19″N 123°04′49″W
- Area: less than one acre
- Built: 1885
- Built by: Watson, John
- Architectural style: Romanesque
- MPS: Dayton MRA
- NRHP reference No.: 87000357
- Added to NRHP: March 16, 1987

The Free Methodist Church is a historic building in Dayton, Oregon, United States. Built in the 19th century, the church building is now occupied by the Dayton Assembly of God Church. The structure was added to the National Register of Historic Places on March 16, 1987.

It was built by a John Watson, who also built other structures in the Dayton area. He served as the first pastor.
