= Methodist Episcopal Parsonage =

Historic church building in Oregon, US

- U.S. National Register of Historic Places
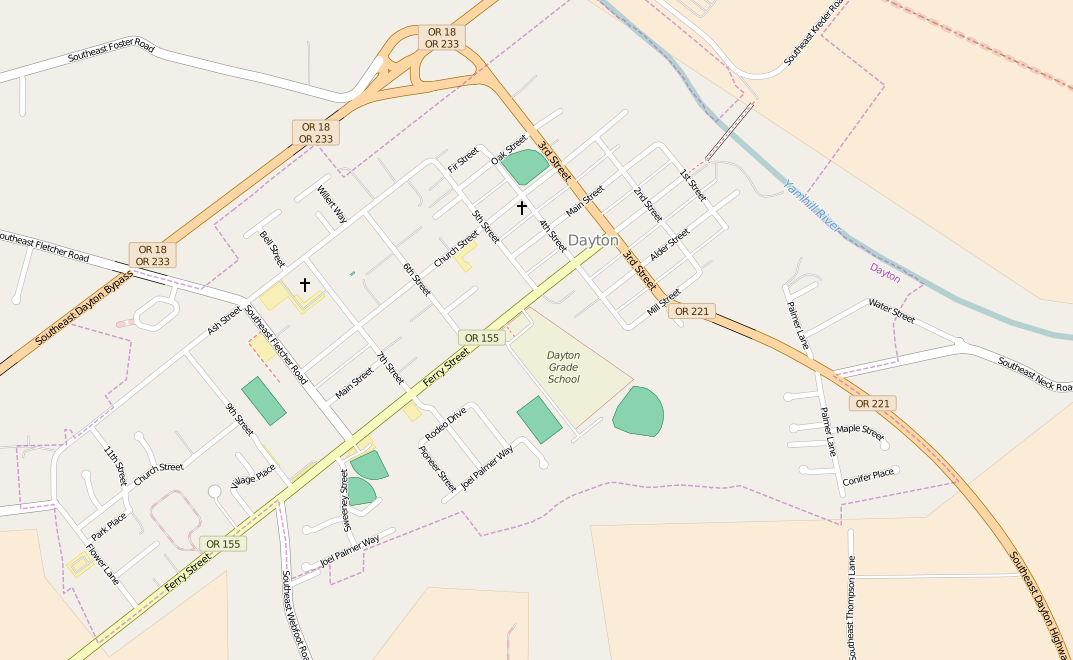
- Location within Dayton OR
- Location: 202 4th Street; Dayton, Oregon
- Coordinates: 45°13′19″N 123°04′44″W
- Area: less than one acre
- Built: 1868
- MPS: Dayton MRA
- NRHP reference No.: 87000393
- Added to NRHP: August 3, 1987

The Methodist Episcopal Parsonage (also known as the Marquez Residence) is a historic church parsonage at 202 Fourth Street in Dayton, Oregon.

It was built in 1868 and added to the National Register of Historic Places in 1987.
