= McMinnville Downtown Historic District =

Historic district in Oregon, United States

- U.S. National Register of Historic Places
- U.S. Historic district
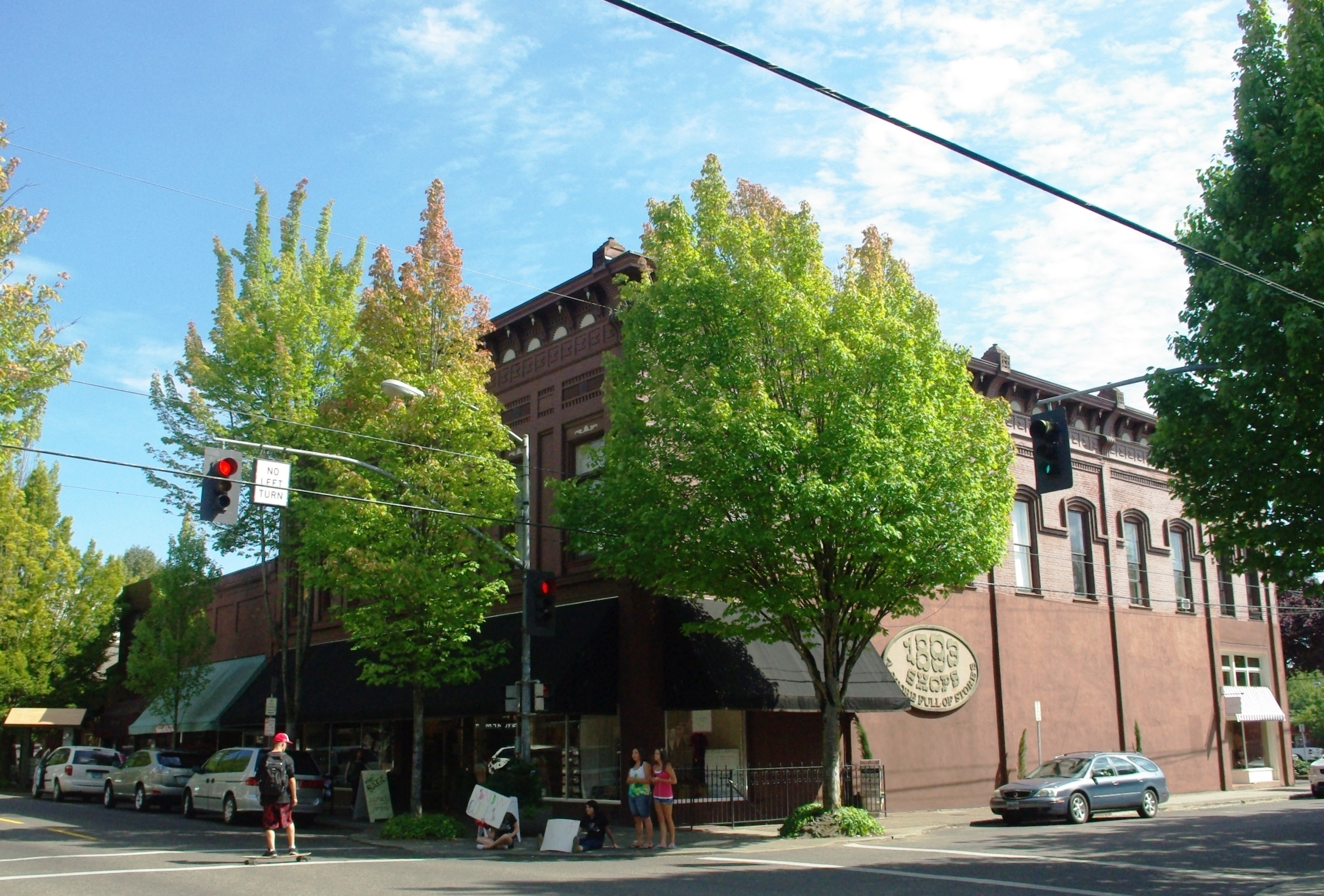
- 406 3rd and Davis
- Location: McMinnville, Oregon; Bounded by 5th St, Union Pacific railroad tracks, 2nd St and N Adams St
- Coordinates: 45°12′36″N 123°11′41″W
- Architect: Multiple
- NRHP reference No.: 87001366
- Added to NRHP: September 14, 1987

McMinnville Downtown Historic District in McMinnville, Oregon, United States is a historic district that was listed on the National Register of Historic Places (NRHP) in 1987.

According to the Oregon State Historic Preservation Office, "There are a total of 66 buildings in the district. However, 521-525 E 3rd is listed as only one building rather than two as in the nomination, lowering the total listing to 65. 611 N 3rd and 425 N Evans are counted and listed separately but have been combined into one building. The following addresses are shared by 2 buildings: 448 E 3rd St, 216 E 3rd St."
