= Evangelical Church of Lafayette =

Historic church in Oregon, United States

- U.S. National Register of Historic Places
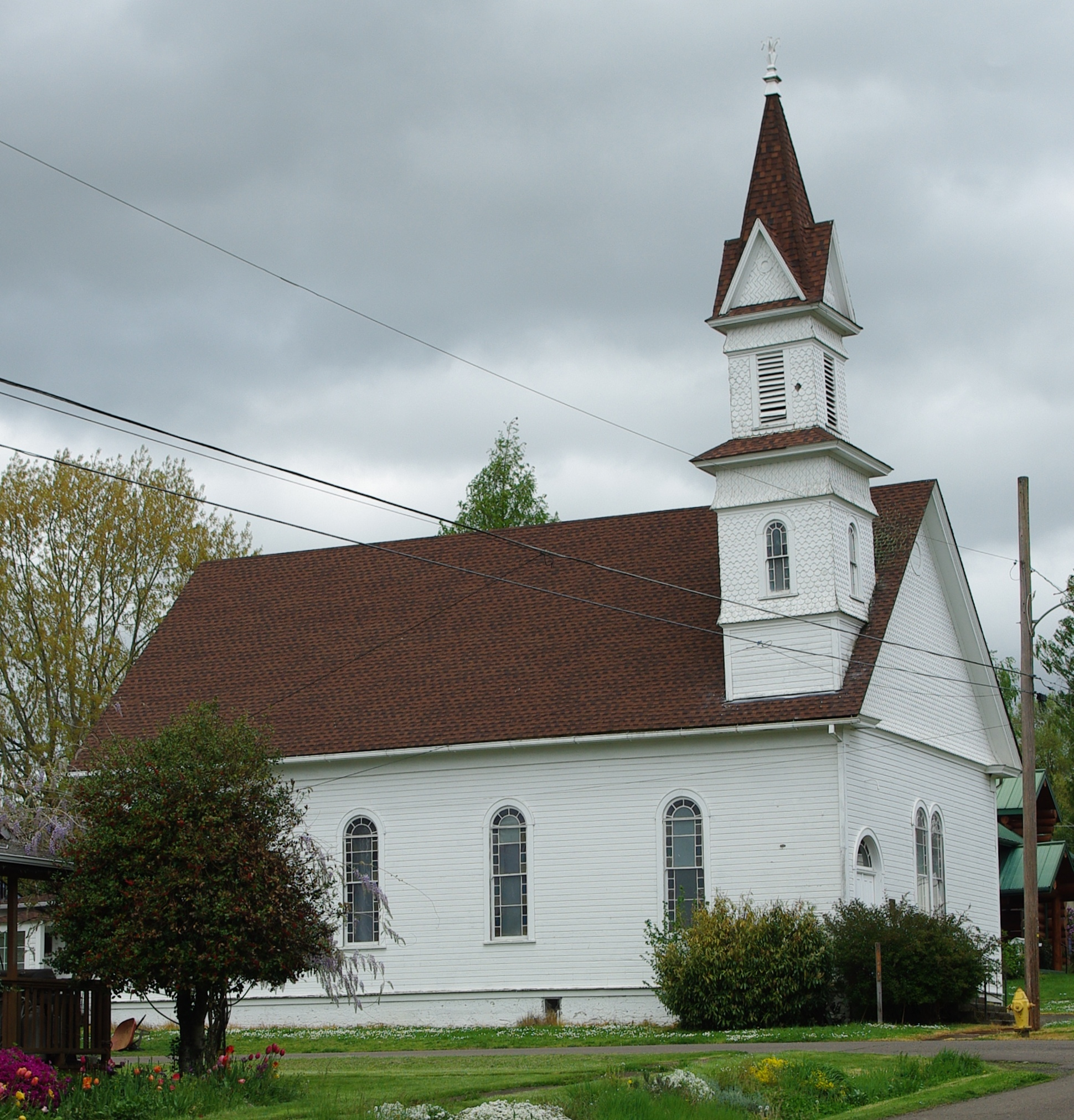

- Location within Oregon Location within the United States
- Location: 605 Market Street; Lafayette, Oregon
- Coordinates: 45°14′45″N 123°06′45″W
- Area: less than one acre
- Built: 1892
- Built by: Charles C. Poling & parishioners
- Architect: Charles C. Poling
- Architectural style: Queen Anne
- NRHP reference No.: 02001278
- Added to NRHP: October 31, 2002

The Evangelical Church of Lafayette (also known as Poling Memorial Church) is a historic church building in Lafayette, Oregon.

The Queen Anne style church building was constructed in 1892. The building's architect was Reverend Charles Cupp Poling, who served as a pastor at the church for 3 years following its construction, and after whom the church is named.

The church served its congregants until 1970, when the building was converted to become the home for the Yamhill County Historical Society and Museums. The church was added to the National Register of Historic Places in 2002. The Historical Society's now-archived 2010 description of the Poling Memorial Church reads:

"Visitors exploring the Church will find displays of local doctor's and dentist's equipment, an early school room, a pioneer bedroom sponsored by the Daughters of the American Revolution, and a parlor containing early 20th century furnishings. Visitors will discover an 18th century clock with wooden gears, a display of photography equipment, a wonderful collection of dolls, Yamhill County memorabilia dating to the late 19th century, and a giant pickled cucumber once featured on Ripley's Believe It or Not!"

The museum is no longer in operation, and was listed for sale in October 2021 at a price of $175,000. It was purchased for $155,000 on January 14, 2022.
