= Gottlieb Londershausen House =

Building in Dayton, Oregon, U.S.

- U.S. National Register of Historic Places
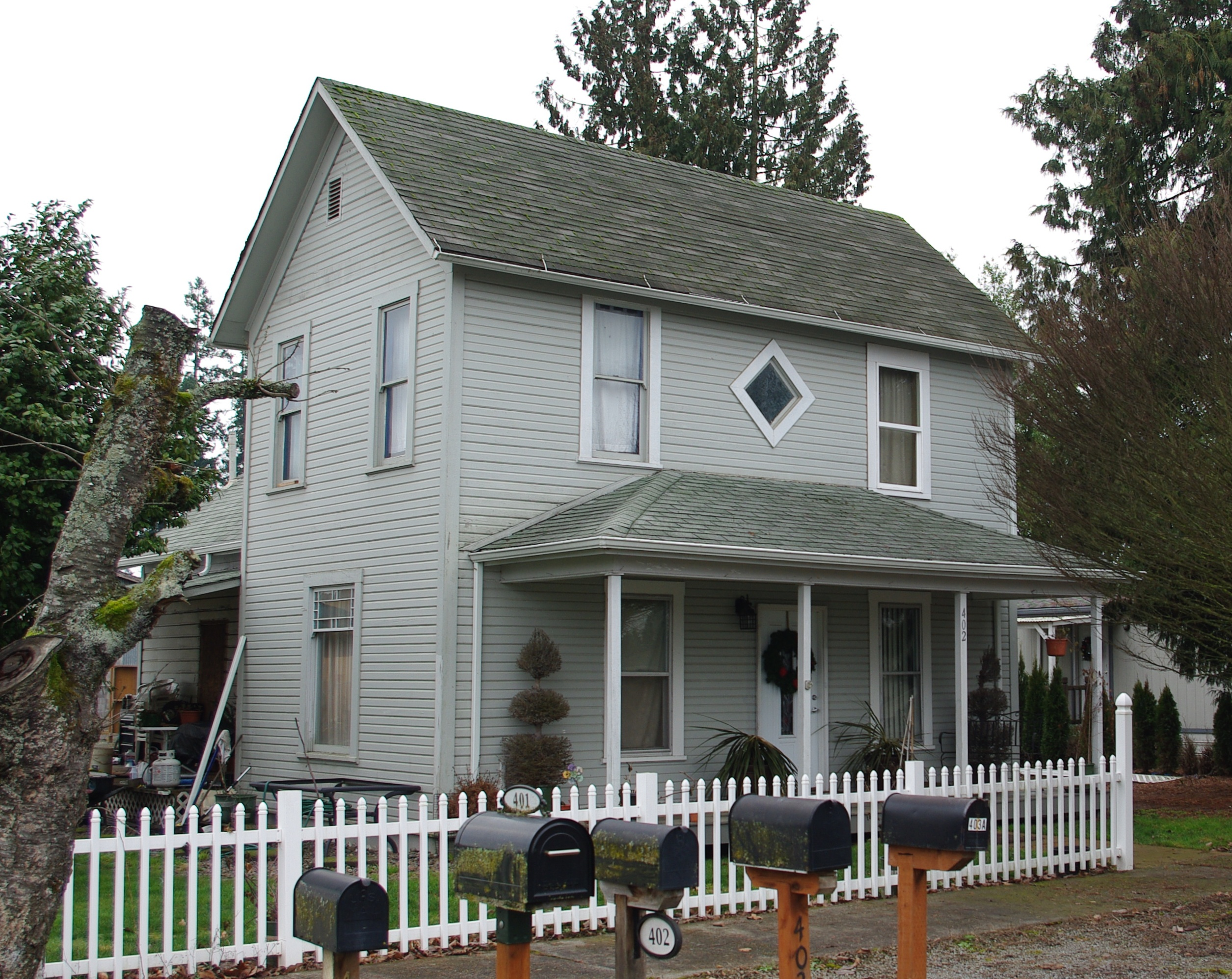
- The house in 2013

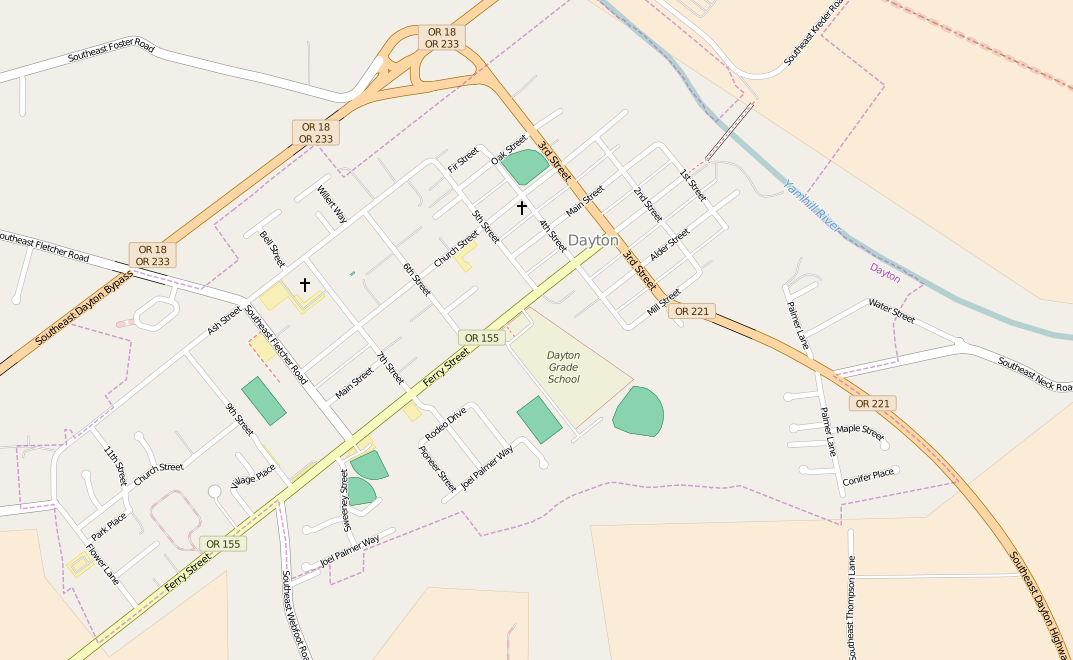
- Location within Dayton OR
- Location: 402 Main Street; Dayton, Oregon
- Coordinates: 45°13′14″N 123°04′40″W
- Area: less than one acre
- Built: c.1907
- MPS: Dayton MRA
- NRHP reference No.: 87000383
- Added to NRHP: March 16, 1987

The Gottlieb Londershausen House, at 402 Main Street, Dayton, Oregon, was built in c. 1907 and is listed on the U.S. National Register of Historic Places. It is also known as the Culp Residence. It is a 2-story 26 feet (7.9 m) by 42 feet (13 m) house.

The house is significant for its association with Gottlieb Londershausen, who immigrated in 1883 to the U.S. and came to Dayton in 1889 with his family. Londershausen operated a shoe and harness repair shop for 29 years, located in two different buildings on Ferry Street between Second and Third Streets.

The house is one block away from the NRHP-listed Paul Londershausen House, located at 309 Main Street. Both houses were listed on the NRHP with the same name, Londerhausen House, in 1987. (Note: In an apparent document switcheroo, the National Park Service text document available at the Paul Londershausen House's reference number (NRIS #87000384) is the form describing the Gottlieb Londershausen House (NRIS #87000383) and vice versa, while their corresponding photo documents are filed at their correct reference numbers.) Paul Londershausen was one of Gottlieb's nine children.

== See also ==
- National Register of Historic Places listings in Yamhill County, Oregon
