= Dundee, Oregon =

- City
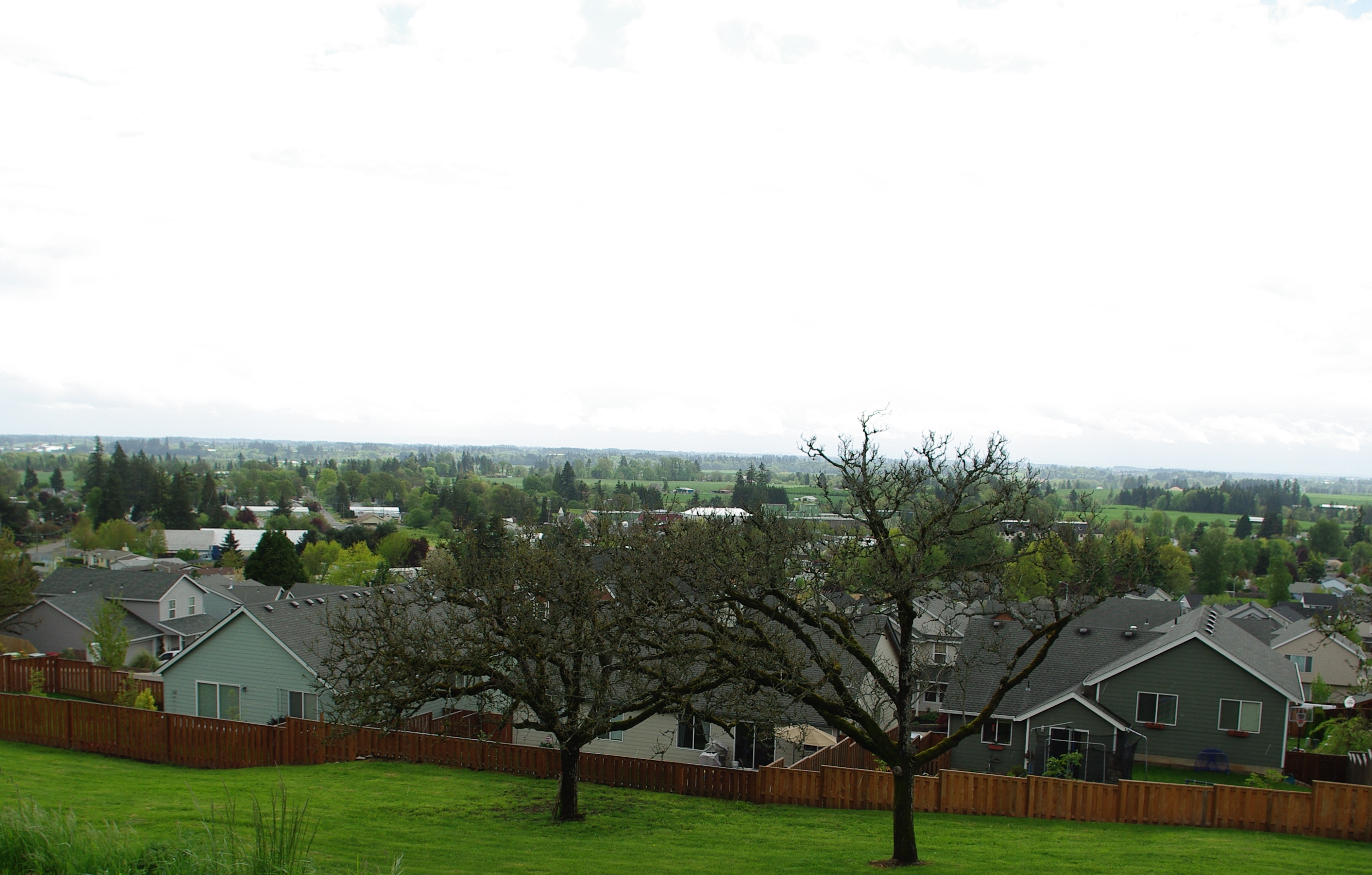
- Overlooking the city

- Location in Oregon
- Coordinates: 45°16′33″N 123°00′25″W
- Country: United States
- State: Oregon
- County: Yamhill
- Incorporated: 1895

Government
  - Mayor: David Russ

Area
  - Total: 1.36 sq mi (3.53 km^{2})
  - Land: 1.34 sq mi (3.47 km^{2})
  - Water: 0.023 sq mi (0.06 km^{2})
- Elevation: 187 ft (57 m)

Population (2020)
  - Total: 3,238
  - Density: 2,418.5/sq mi (933.79/km^{2})
- Time zone: UTC-8 (Pacific)
  - Summer (DST): UTC-7 (Pacific)
- ZIP code: 97115
- Area code: 503
- FIPS code: 41-21050
- GNIS feature ID: 2410370
- Website: www.dundeecity.org

Dundee /ˈdʌndiː/ is a city in Yamhill County, Oregon, United States. The population was 3,238 at the 2020 census.

== History ==
Dundee was named after Dundee, Scotland, the birthplace of William Reid. Reid came to Oregon in 1874 to establish the Oregonian Railway, and made several extensions to the railroad in the western Willamette Valley.

The first post office in the area, established in 1881, was called Ekins. The Ekins post office was closed in 1885, and in 1887 a new office opened and was named "Dundee Junction." The name was chosen in anticipation of plans to build a bridge across the Willamette River for the railroad, which would have called for a junction at Dundee between the west railroad and the new east railroad. The bridge was never built, however, and the post office was renamed "Dundee" in 1897.

In 1913, the Dundee Woman's Club was founded and later established a community center.

== Geography ==
According to the United States Census Bureau, the city has a total area of 1.35 square miles (3.50 km^{2}), of which 1.33 square miles (3.44 km^{2}) is land and 0.02 square miles (0.05 km^{2}) is water.

Dundee is two miles southwest of the city of Newberg.

== Demographics ==
Historical population
Census	Pop.	Note	%±
1900	124		—
1910	196		58.1%
1920	193		−1.5%
1930	232		20.2%
1940	209		−9.9%
1950	308		47.4%
1960	318		3.2%
1970	588		84.9%
1980	1,223		108.0%
1990	1,663		36.0%
2000	2,598		56.2%
2010	3,162		21.7%
2020	3,238		2.4%
U.S. Decennial Census

=== 2020 census ===
As of the 2020 census, Dundee had a population of 3,238 and a median age of 40.6 years. 24.0% of residents were under the age of 18 and 15.4% of residents were 65 years of age or older. For every 100 females there were 98.0 males, and for every 100 females age 18 and over there were 95.9 males age 18 and over.

As of the 2020 census, 99.5% of residents lived in urban areas, while 0.5% lived in rural areas.

As of the 2020 census, there were 1,168 households in Dundee, of which 38.0% had children under the age of 18 living in them. Of all households, 61.6% were married-couple households, 12.3% were households with a male householder and no spouse or partner present, and 19.4% were households with a female householder and no spouse or partner present. About 16.7% of all households were made up of individuals and 8.1% had someone living alone who was 65 years of age or older.

As of the 2020 census, there were 1,213 housing units, of which 3.7% were vacant. Among occupied housing units, 81.2% were owner-occupied and 18.8% were renter-occupied. The homeowner vacancy rate was 0.4% and the rental vacancy rate was 4.6%.

Racial composition as of the 2020 census
Race	Number	Percent
White	2,633	81.3%
Black or African American	12	0.4%
American Indian and Alaska Native	22	0.7%
Asian	44	1.4%
Native Hawaiian and Other Pacific Islander	7	0.2%
Some other race	204	6.3%
Two or more races	316	9.8%
Hispanic or Latino (of any race)	444	13.7%

=== 2010 census ===
As of the census of 2010, there were 3,162 people, 1,136 households, and 866 families living in the city. The population density was 2,377.4 inhabitants per square mile (917.9/km^{2}). There were 1,175 housing units at an average density of 883.5 per square mile (341.1/km^{2}). The racial makeup of the city was 91.2% White, 0.4% African American, 1.2% Native American, 1.4% Asian, 0.2% Pacific Islander, 3.1% from other races, and 2.6% from two or more races. Hispanic or Latino of any race were 10.4% of the population.

There were 1,136 households, of which 41.1% had children under the age of 18 living with them, 62.4% were married couples living together, 8.9% had a female householder with no husband present, 4.9% had a male householder with no wife present, and 23.8% were non-families. 19.3% of all households were made up of individuals, and 8% had someone living alone who was 65 years of age or older. The average household size was 2.78 and the average family size was 3.15.

The median age in the city was 36.7 years. 27.8% of residents were under the age of 18; 6.7% were between the ages of 18 and 24; 29.3% were from 25 to 44; 26.1% were from 45 to 64; and 10.2% were 65 years of age or older. The gender makeup of the city was 50.3% male and 49.7% female.

=== 2000 census ===
As of the census of 2000, there were 2,598 people, 921 households, and 715 families living in the city. The population density was 1,915.5 inhabitants per square mile (739.6/km^{2}). There were 952 housing units at an average density of 701.9 per square mile (271.0/km^{2}). The racial makeup of the city was 92.73% White, 0.85% Native American, 1.00% Asian, 3.31% from other races, and 2.12% from two or more races. Hispanic or Latino of any race were 7.54% of the population.

There were 921 households, out of which 41.2% had children under the age of 18 living with them, 65.8% were married couples living together, 8.8% had a female householder with no husband present, and 22.3% were non-families. 17.8% of all households were made up of individuals, and 7.2% had someone living alone who was 65 years of age or older. The average household size was 2.82 and the average family size was 3.23.

In the city, the population was spread out, with 30.6% under the age of 18, 6.9% from 18 to 24, 32.6% from 25 to 44, 20.7% from 45 to 64, and 9.2% who were 65 years of age or older. The median age was 34 years. For every 100 females, there were 98.6 males. For every 100 females age 18 and over, there were 93.4 males.

The median income for a household in the city was $50,284, and the median income for a family was $56,429. Males had a median income of $41,005 versus $25,776 for females. The per capita income for the city was $20,455. About 5.7% of families and 6.6% of the population were below the poverty line, including 8.8% of those under age 18 and 5.0% of those age 65 or over.

== Government ==
In 2005, the Dundee City Council voted to disband its police department and contract police services to the Newberg Police Department in nearby Newberg. The Newberg Police Department was then renamed the Newberg-Dundee Police Department.

== See also ==
- Ash Island
