= Paul Londershausen House =

Building in Dayton, Oregon, U.S.

- U.S. National Register of Historic Places
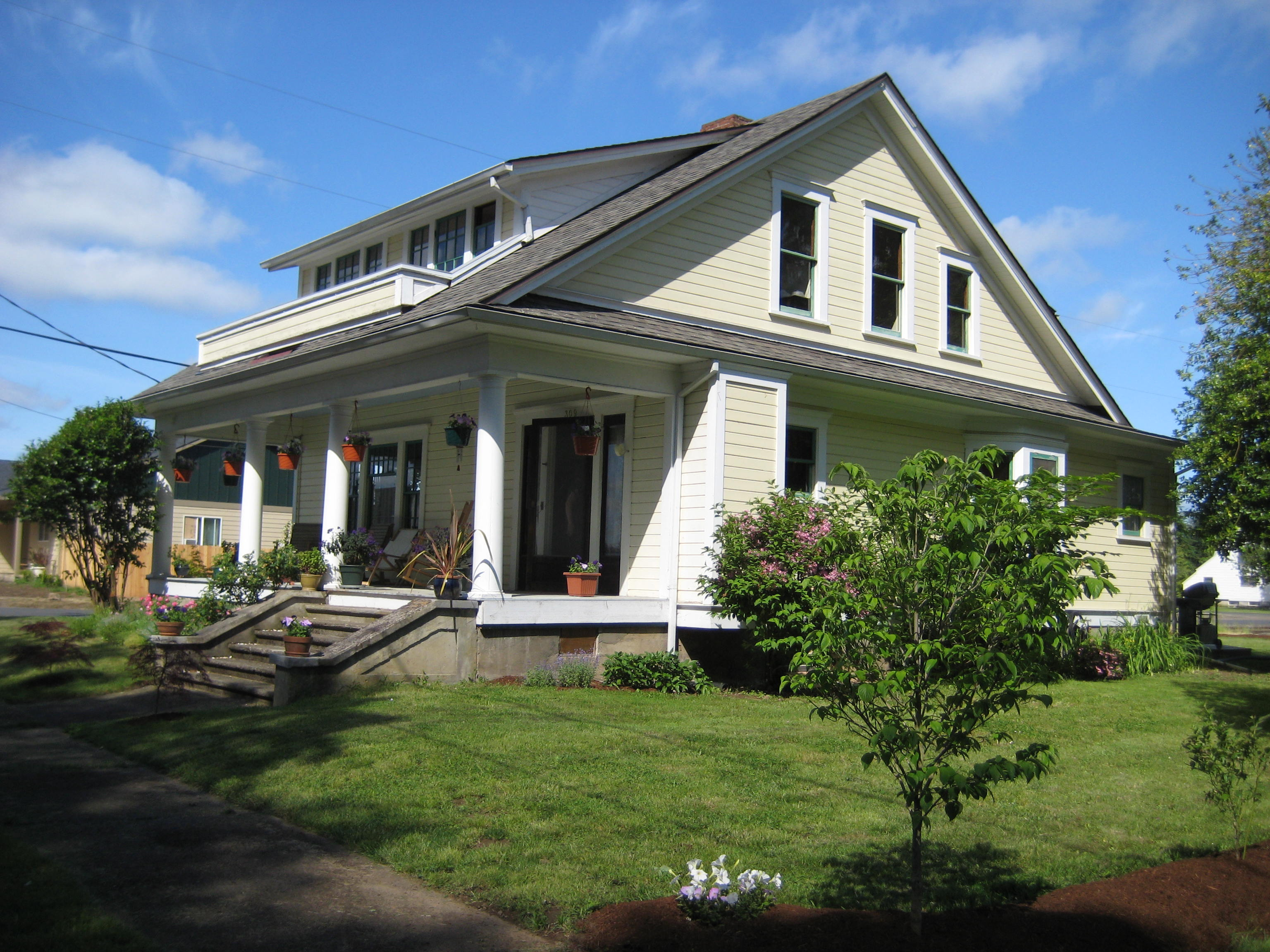

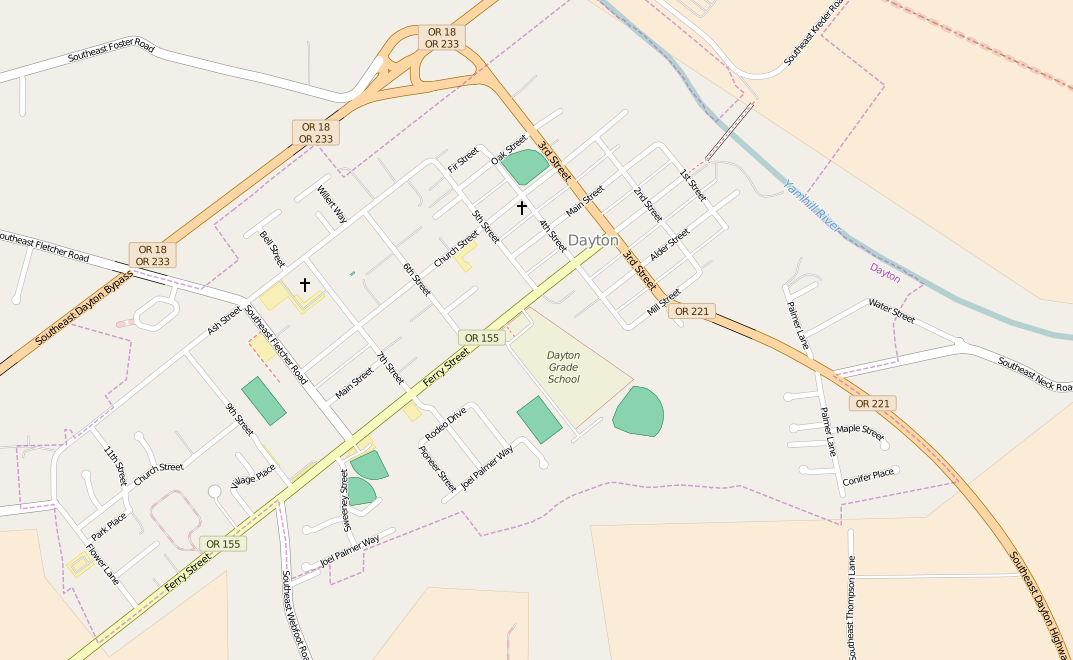
- Location within Dayton OR
- Location: 309 Main Street; Dayton, Oregon
- Coordinates: 45°13′16″N 123°04′39″W
- Built: 1921
- Architectural style: Bungalow/Craftsman
- MPS: Dayton MRA
- NRHP reference No.: 87000384
- Added to NRHP: March 16, 1987

The Paul Londershausen House, at 309 Main Street, Dayton, Oregon, United States, is a Bungalow/Craftsman-style house that was built in 1921. It is also known as the Londershausen Residence or as the Walters Residence and is listed on the National Register of Historic Places.

The house was deemed significant "as one of the best examples of the Craftsman Bungalow style in Dayton, and the best preserved example locally." Its front porch has four turned columns with capitals; its rear porch has been enclosed. It is a 1 1/2-story house that is 34 feet (10 m) by 36 feet (11 m) in plan.

The house is associated with Germany-born Paul Londerhausen (b.1883), a hops farmer who lived in Dayton for 59 years, who moved into the house in 1921 when it was built. Londerhausen was one of nine children, and one of the five who lived with their father Gottlieb Londershausen in Dayton in 1910 according to the 1910 census. Londerhausen served as a City Councilman and in other city positions.

The house is one block away from the NRHP-listed Gottlieb Londershausen House, located at 402 Main Street. Both houses were listed on the NRHP with the same name, Londerhausen House, in 1987. (Note: In an apparent document switcheroo, the National Park Service text document available at the Paul Londershausen House's reference number (NRIS #87000384) is the form describing the Gottlieb Londershausen House (NRIS #87000383) and vice versa, while their corresponding photo documents are filed at their correct numbers.)
