= Newport (steamboat) =

- Newport with passenger barge Elk, circa 1910.

History
- Name: Newport
- Route: Yaquina Bay and Yaquina River
- Launched: May 20, 1908 Yaquina City, Oregon
- Completed: 1908
- Identification: US registry #205273
- Fate: Abandoned by 1930

General characteristics
- Type: inland passenger, wood construction
- Tonnage: 77 gross; 54 regis. tons
- Length: 72 ft (21.95 m)
- Beam: 16.4 ft (5.00 m)
- Depth: 5.4 ft (1.65 m) depth of hold
- Installed power: Originally steam engine, 160 indicated NHP; converted 1914 to gasoline-engine, 110 horsepower.
- Propulsion: propeller

Newport was an American steamboat built in 1908 at Yaquina City, Oregon. Now a ghost town, Yaquina City was then the terminus of the Corvallis & Eastern Railroad. For many years Newport transported excursionists in the summer months across a short water route between Yaquina City and the town of Newport, Oregon.

Newport was originally built as a steam-powered vessel, and used some of the components, including the boiler, from an earlier steamer, the T.M. Richardson.

Although only a small wooden vessel, Newport, with the aid of an unpowered barge lashed alongside, transported as many as 500 passengers at a time on the short trip across Yaquina Bay. In 1914, to accommodate anticipated greater patronage of the rail line, Newport was converted to gasoline engine power.

== Purpose ==
In 1908, the Newport–Yaquina route was purchased by Jack Fogarty and Capt. Oscar F. Jacobson from Capt. Chatterton. Fogarty and Jacobson were brothers-in-law, O. F. Jacobson being married to Julia Fogarty (died 1918), Jack Fogarty's sister.

Passengers bound for Newport, Agate Beach, Otter Rocks, Seal Rocks, Waldport, Tidewater and Yachats would arrive by rail at Yaquina City, Oregon. Baggage and cargo would be transferred from the train to the steamer by the train pulling out onto a pier and the baggage then being sent down a chute onto the steamer.

== Construction and dimensions ==
The basic dimensions of Newport were 72 ft (21.95 m) and 81 gross tons. The boiler from the old steamer T.M. Richardson was to be placed in the new steamer, which was built at Yaquina City, Oregon to replace Richardson.

Alternatively, the registered dimensions of the vessel, in 1909, were 72 ft (21.95 m) length, beam of 16.4 ft (5.00 m), depth of hold of 5.4 ft (1.65 m), 77 gross tons and 54 registered tons. Total crew required was three. The steam power plant generated 160 indicated horsepower. The official registration number was 205273.

In February 1908, the Newport Navigation Company began preparing to build a new steamboat to be used on the run between Yaquina City, Oregon and Newport. The new boat would be built at Yaquina City, Oregon and would replace T.M. Richardson which had been on the route for the previous fifteen to twenty years. Construction was anticipated to begin soon after February 1908, and would be supervised by George Walker, a well-known boat builder.

Newport was launched at 4:00 p.m. of Wednesday, May 20, 1908. A large crowd was brought across the bay from Newport to witness the launch. Julia Jacobson, wife of one of the owners, spoke the words "I christen thee Newport" as she broke a bottle of wine over the bows.

The new vessel was 78 feet long overall, with a beam of 16 feet. The boat was built for the Newport Navigation Company.

The steamer Newport was taken out on a trial trip on Saturday, June 6, 1908.

== Early operations ==
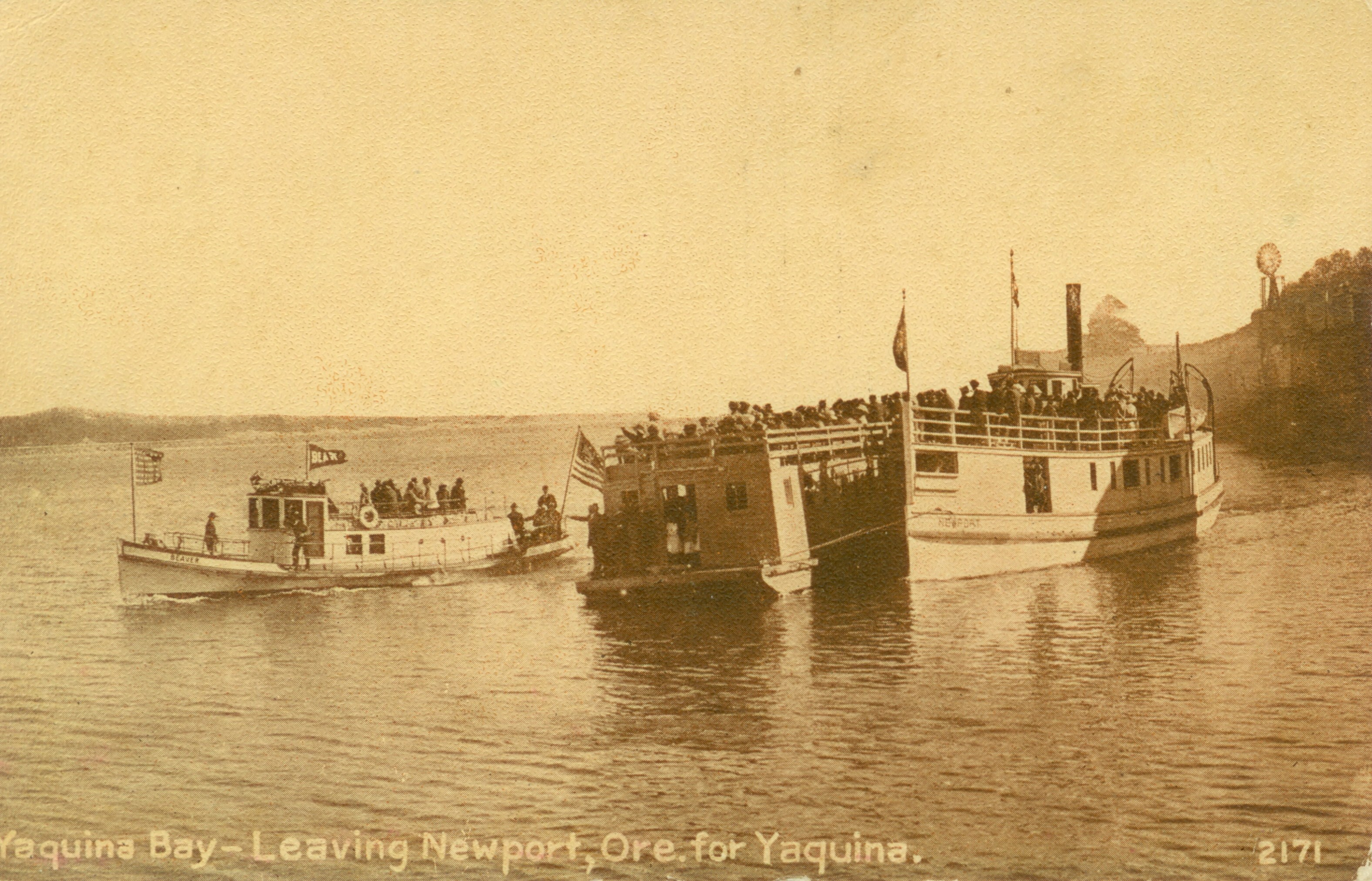
Newport on Yaquina Bay, with passenger barge Elk lashed alongside.

On November 7, 1908, Newport came upriver to Toledo, Oregon from Newport city with the barge Elk. The barge was placed out of service for the winter, in fresh water at a mill owned by one Altree.

Jack Fogarty was serving as engineer on the Newport in 1909, with George C. Walker as his relief.

In mid-June, 1910, passengers arriving at Yaquina City for transport to Newport averaged over 50 daily, an unusually high number for that time of the year. Captain Jacobson, of the Newport, reported this to have been the heaviest June travel in his experience. Plans were being made for special railroad excursions for Independence Day celebrations in Newport.

During peak travel times, generally during the summer vacation seasons, the passenger carrying capacity of Newport was augmented by lashing up alongside the steamer an unpowered barge, the Elk or the Julia. Elk, a scow with a cabin, was built in 1905 at Toledo, Oregon, was registered as an "unrigged vessel", of 97 gross and 94 net tons, with the official merchant registry number 162693. According to the official registry, four crewmen were required on board Elk.

Newport with barge Julia lashed alongside. Built with a steamboat's hull, Julia was originally planned to be a powered vessel, but ended up being operated as an unpowered barge; the steamboat hull is clearly visible in this image.

The Julia, at 53 gross and net tons, was built in 1912, at George C. Walker's then new shipyard in Toledo. Julia was originally intended to be a powered steamboat, 85 feet long and 18 feet beam, but used as a barge for the first summer season after completion. No power plant was ever installed however, and Julia remained an unpowered barge.

Like Elk, Julia was officially listed as an "unrigged vessel", but with a different official number, Julia was named after Captain Jacobson's wife. Unlike the scow Elk, Julia was built with a river steamboat hull, allowing better speed to be made on excursions. Julia could carry 300 people living in the county. Reportedly Julia had "good seats and open decks."

== Large crowds at the Newport waterfront ==
On Sunday, July 24, 1910, Newport transported in one trip, 500 persons to the dock at the Newport waterfront. A crowd of 1,500 people gathered at the dock to greet the new arrivals. A city marshal, M.B. Grant, had to clear a path through the crowd to allow the disembarking passengers to cross the dock from the steamer to the street. While doing so, Grant encountered Howard Bush, a merchant from Summit, Oregon, and asked Bush to step back. Bush refused, struck Grant a blow on his nose with a fist, and knocked Grant to the ground.

Bush continued to attack Grant while the marshal was on the ground. Another marshal, Blattener, pulled Bush off Grant. Grant then subdued Bush with three blows of the billy club to Grant's head, lacerating him severely. Grant then arrested the by then submissive Bush, took him to jail, where his wounds were sewn up by a physician, Dr. Carter. Grant was charged with interfering with a police officer, and released on $100 cash bail with orders to appear before a justice of the peace the next morning.

== Operations up to 1914 ==
In mid-October 1911, Newport broke its propeller shaft. The boat was brought to Toledo for repairs, which were completed by October 20, 1911. The work was done by the Modern Improvement Company, of which George C. Walker, the relief captain of Newport, was a principal until January 2, 1912.

The summer of 1913 was one of the busiest ever yet for tourism at Newport. As of August 4, 1913, over 3,500 persons had arrived at the city in the previous eight days. Overcrowded trains on the Southern Pacific line to Yaquina City were reported to be running an average of an hour late. It was said that the boiler on the Newport (which came from the condemned steamer T.M. Richardson) was too small for its engine. According to a newspaper report, "throngs, herded like cattle on boats and barges, pass about an hour on a ride of three minus and a half across the bay when compelled to go to restaurants." Reportedly hundreds of passengers had complained to the railway or the steamboat company, but nothing had been done to improve things.

== Band to greet passengers on arrival ==
In May 1913 plans were made to sponsor a local band in Newport, consisting then of 14 members, which among other things, would greet passengers arriving on the steamer Newport at the city dock. The band was under the direction of J.P. Fenwick. Motion pictures were shown in Newport on May 19 and 20, 1913, and the proceeds from the ticket sales were donated to the Newport band to buy new instruments and music so that the band could be expanded. Captain R.D. Morse, of the gasoline launch Ahwaneda (built in 1912), offered to turn over the proceeds of three or four excursion trips to support the band. In May, the plans were to meet the Newport on Sundays and three or four evenings during the week. The band also intended to give concerts at Nye Beach on Sunday afternoons during the summer.

== Conversion to gasoline engine power ==
In January 1914, Capt. Oscar F. Jacobson travelled to Portland, Oregon where he purchased a 110 horse power Western Standard gasoline engine, which he intended to install in time for the next summer season. The Newport Navigation Company, owners of the vessel, decided to make to the conversion in anticipation of increased patronage due to the improvement of the Corvallis & Eastern’s rail line to Yaquina, by the addition of ballast and the laying of heavier rail.

The engine arrived at Toledo in early March, 1914. Work on installing the new power plant began on the morning of March 6, 1914, when the steamer arrived at Toledo from Newport. The new machinery was reported to be able to double the power of the vessel, and "greatly increase her efficiency in transporting the passengers from Yaquina to Newport during the big Summer rushes. The travel time from Yaquina to Newport was expected to be reduced by ten minutes. Running time would then be down to 15 minutes.

The steamer was then owned by the Newport Navigation Company. George C. Walker, an experienced Yaquina Bay steamboat man and boatbuilder, who by then was living in California, was requested by telegraph to return to Yaquina City to supervise the work. The gasoline-powered Truant, itself a converted steamer, would replace Newport while the conversion was underway.

The work was nearing completion on March 27, 1914.

On Thursday, April 2, 1914, the Newport returned to the lower Yaquina Bay from Toledo, under power from the new gasoline engine. With the conversion of Newport to gasoline power, there were no longer any steam-driven vessels operating on Yaquina Bay.

Because of the increased speed due to the new engine, Newport was able to adjust its schedule, departing the Newport waterfront for Yaquina City at 7:00 a.m. daily, rather than the previous time of 6:45 a.m. The schedule change took effect on April 22, 1914.

== Later operations ==
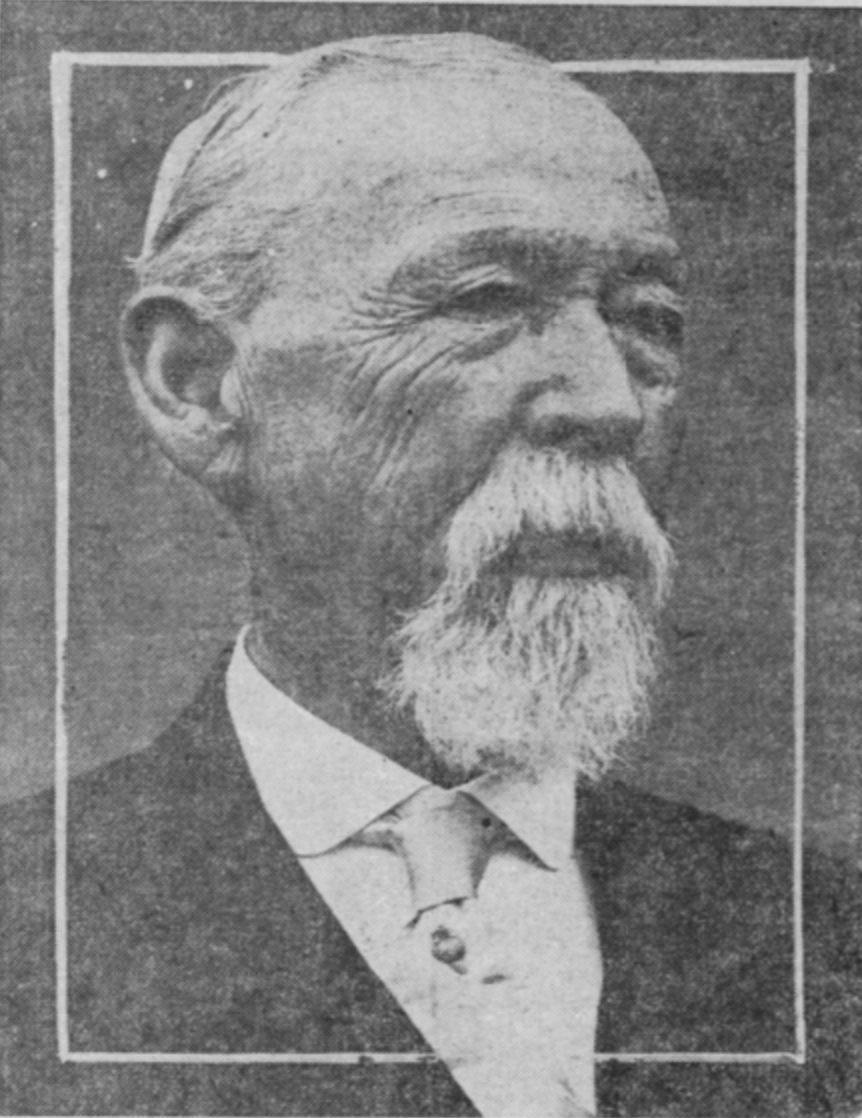
John Marshall, president of the Newport Navigation Company, at age 84 in 1919.

In the parade of boats held on July 4, 1914, Newport and the barge Julia won first prize for decoration. According to a newspaper report, "the Newport and the royal barge, Julia were beautifully and elaborately decorated with bunting, flags and [C]hinese lanterns, making a most beautiful and brilliant experience.

On Sunday, July 19, 1914, over 1000 people travelled on the railroad between Albany, Oregon and Yaquina City. Two trains arrived and three trains departed from Yaquina City. To accommodate the traffic, Newport made five trips that Sunday, with the barge Julia, between Yaquina City and the Newport waterfront.

In April 1918, repairs to Newport were completed at the Anderson Boat Works at Toledo, Oregon. The barge Julia was hauled out for repairs shortly after the work was complete on Newport.

In March 1920, John "Johnny" Marshall, president of the Newport Navigation Company, visited Newport to inspect Newport, which was then operating between South Beach and Yaquina City. Marshall was then 82 years of age, and was probably the most senior of the steamboat men then living.

Marshall had been friends with a number of historical figures, including Ulysses S. Grant, whom he had visited in the White House, and generals Hooker and George B. McClellan. Marshall had served as engineer on a number of well-known vessels on the Columbia and Willamette rivers, including Enterprise (1855), Wide West, Hassalo, Senator, and Willamette Chief.

In June 1920, the rail service to Yaquina City, and the processing of detraining and boarding the Newport, came under newspaper criticism. Only one train per day was now running, and the cargo transfer facilities had deteriorated, with the pier that once supported the train having rotted partially away.

In March 1922, Newport was undergoing repairs at Toledo, at the Altree shipyard. The work included an overhaul, repaint, with new guard rails and the addition of some new timbers. The schooner Sea Foam was placed on the run temporarily while Newport was out of service.

Newport was scheduled to be back on the run on Wednesday, March 30, 1922.

== Disposition ==
Newport continued to be registered as a passenger vessel in 1922–1923, although the gross tonnage of the vessel was now reported as 81. Newport was listed as abandoned in the 1930 registry of merchant vessels.

== Relic ==
As of 2013, the wheel of the Newport was in the possession of the Lincoln County Historical Society and on exhibit.

== See also ==
- Steamboats of the Oregon Coast
- Steamboats of Yaquina Bay and Yaquina River
