= Tressa May =

American steamboat

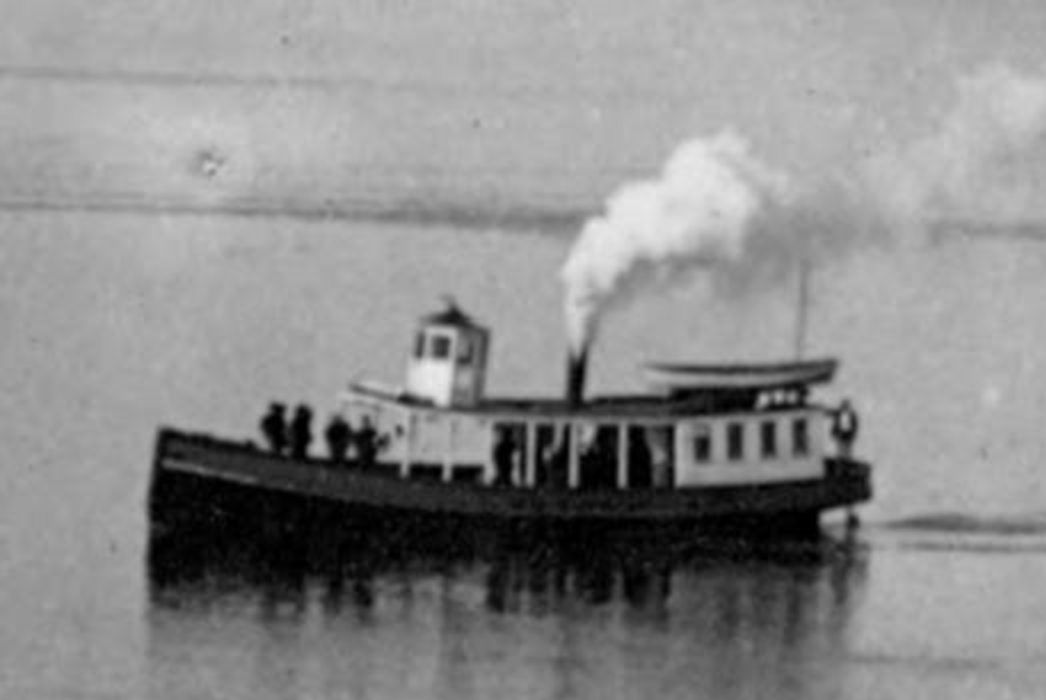
- Tressa May on Yaquina Bay, probably June 1887.

History
- Name: Tressa May
- Route: Yaquina Bay
- In service: 1883
- Out of service: 1888
- Identification: U.S. 145364
- Fate: Dismantled
- Notes: Wooden hull

General characteristics
- Type: Inland passenger
- Tonnage: 48.84 gross tons, 39.60 net tons
- Length: 57 ft (17.37 m)
- Beam: 14.5 ft (4.42 m)
- Depth: 5.0 ft (1.52 m)
- Installed power: steam engine, later
- Propulsion: propeller

Tressa May was a steamboat that was operated in the Yaquina Bay region of Oregon from 1883 to 1888.

== Design and construction ==
Tressa May was built in East Portland, Oregon in 1883. The boat was commissioned by Capt. Stephen B. Ives, and launched under the name Robert G. Ingersoll, as Capt. Ives was an admirer of that orator. Ives encountered financial difficulties and had to sell the new boat. The new owners renamed the vessel Tressa May.

== Dimensions and power ==
The boat was 57 ft (17.37 m) long with a beam of 14.5 ft (4.42 m) and depth of hold of 5.0 ft (1.52 m). Tressa May measured out at 48.84 gross tons (a measurement of carrying capacity, not weight) and 39.60 net tons. The official merchant vessel registry number was 145364.

Tressa May was the first steamer on the west coast to be fitted with a Westinghouse engine.

== Operations ==
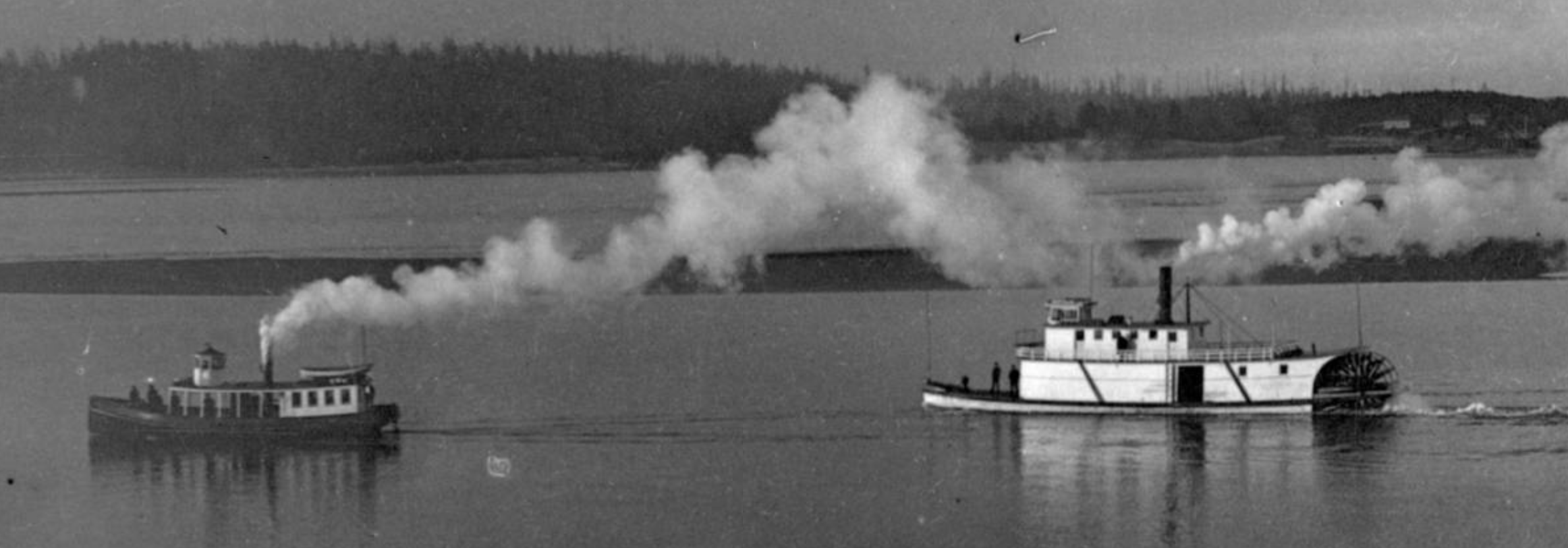
Tressa May leading Montesano in a race on Yaquina Bay, probably in June 1887.

In 1886 the home port for Tressa May was Portland, Oregon. The boat however had been operating in Yaquina Bay since August 1885, if not earlier.

On Saturday August 8, 1885, when Tressa May was under the command of Captain Dodge, the boat was making a landing at a dock when the vessel was backed into a scow, which broke the propeller. Tressa May was replaced on the route by the Benton for the day. The next Monday morning, August 10, 1885, Captain Dodge went to Portland for a replacement propeller.

In 1886 Tressa May was purchased by James T. Chatterton (b. 1851), who had earlier run the boat for a few months on a sea otter hunting expedition. One source reports that Tressa May had been built for sea-going work as Robert G. Ingersoll, but had been converted to a riverine freight and passenger service by Chatterton when he bought the boat in 1886.

On March 28, 1886, Tressa May was aground at Newport, Oregon.

In 1887, the home port for Tressa May was Yaquina City, Oregon.

In June 1887, D.H. Welch, owner of the sternwheeler Montesano, raced against Tressa May on Yaquina Bay from Yaquina City to Newport. Both vessels arrived at almost the same time, with Montesano just a little ahead.

In December 1887, Chatterton, captain of Tressa May, was fined $1,000 in U.S. District Court for carrying excessive passengers on the steamer.

== Disposition ==
John T. Chatterton operated Tressa May until 1888, when he built the steamer T.M. Richardson. Tressa May was dismantled. It was the practice to reuse machinery and other parts stripped from dismantled vessels in newer craft. The hull of Tressa May ended up being abandoned on the Yaquina River, and could be seen for many years at Dumpy Brown’s Landing across from Parker’s Mill, at Yaquina City.

== See also ==
- Steamboats of Yaquina Bay and Yaquina River
- Steamboats of the Columbia River
