= T. M. Richardson =

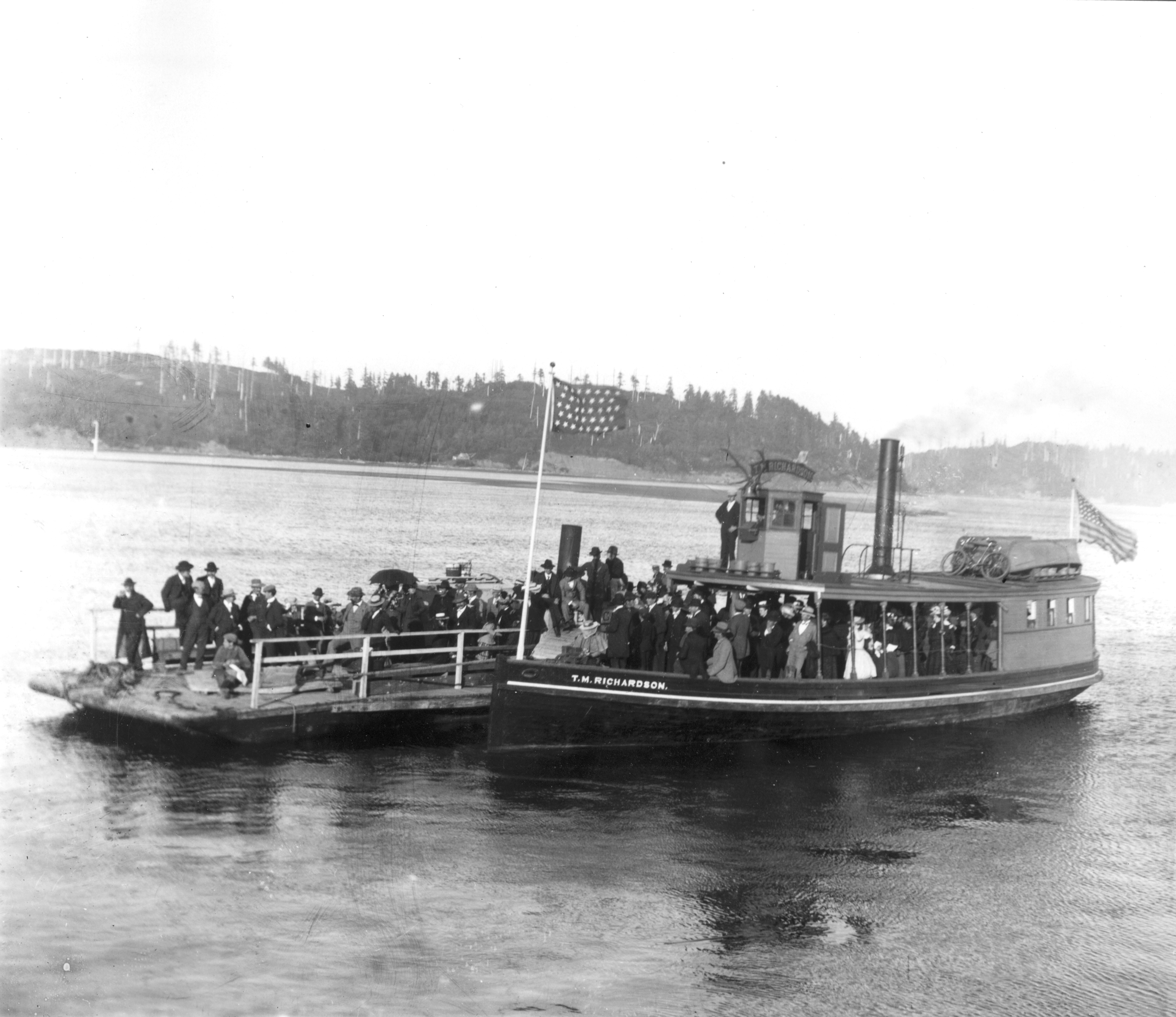
- T.M. Richardson with passenger barge

History
- Name: T.M. Richardson
- Route: Yaquina Bay and Yaquina River
- Completed: 1888, at Oneatta, Oregon
- Identification: US registry #145490

General characteristics
- Type: inland steamboat
- Tonnage: 36.38 gross; 24.53 regis. tons
- Length: 64 ft (19.51 m)
- Beam: 14.5 ft (4.42 m)
- Depth: 5 ft (1.52 m) depth of hold
- Installed power: steam engine, 125 NHP.
- Propulsion: propeller

T.M. Richardson was a steamboat built in 1888 at Oneatta, Oregon, which served on Yaquina Bay and on the Yaquina River from 1888 to 1908. This vessel was commonly known as the Richardson or the T.M.

== Construction ==
T.M. Richardson was built in 1888 at Oneatta, Oregon by Capt. James T. Chatterton. (b. 1851) The boat measured 64 ft (19.51 m) long, 14.5 ft (4.42 m) beam, 5 ft (1.52 m) depth of hold, 36.38 gross tons and 24.53 registered tons. T.M. Richardson was driving by a steam engine which generated 125 nominal horsepower In 1890, T.M. Richardson was licensed to carry only about 100 persons.

== Route ==
In 1890, Richardson was employed on the water route between Newport and Yaquina City, making the trip twice a day. In 1893, T.M. Richardson was also used to tow rock scows for government engineering works. The water route from Yaquina City to Newport was four miles long.

== Career ==
T.M. Richardson at the dock at Newport. A band is playing on the dock to welcome the new arrivals. There appears to be a barge loaded with passengers on the left side of the steamer.

From 1888 to at least 1895, Captain Chatterton used T.M. Richardson for ferrying and towing on Yaquina Bay, in Lincoln County, on the central Oregon coast.

The original head of navigation on the Yaquina River was Elk City. Elk City was about twenty (20) miles upriver from Yaquina City.

According to B.F. Jones, a steamboat man of Yaquina Bay and river, vessels drawing 8 to 10 feet of water were reported to have been easily able to reach Elk City. This included the Richardson, which drew 6 or 7 feet of water, the General Wright, a government vessel, drawing 8 to 10 feet, and the Volante, a smaller steamer which was reported to have drawn 8.5 to 9 feet of water. However, in 1910 it was claimed that quarrying and logging along the banks of the Yaquina River had caused silt and debris to wash down the river, making it more shallow and less navigable.

The machinery for Richardson came from the Tressa May, also known as the Teresa May, in 1888, when the Tressa May was condemned and taken out of service. The engines were not new even in the Tressa May.

During the winter months of 1888 and 1889, Richardson worked under government contract moving scows of rock and pilings for the construction work on jetties at the mouth of Yaquina Bay.

Captain Chatterton was in charge of the Richardson in 1891.

On April 5, 1893 the Tacoma steamship Alice Blanchard with a cargo of 271 tons of wheat and 100 tons of coal, was sighted in distress off the Yaquina bar. The only steam tug then in Yaquina Bay, the Resolute, was then under repair and unable to assist. Some fishermen did board the Alice Blanchard and succeeded in drifting the vessel over the bar. T.M. Richardson and another Yaquina Bay steamer, Volanta and then went to assist the Alice Blanchard the vessel went aground on the south jetty, about 300 feet (91 m) from the tramway then being used for jetty construction. Every rope fastened to the vessel by the steamers parted and the vessel settled in the sand.

On July 4, 1893, Richardson transported 89 passengers from Toledo to Newport.

== Quarry service ==
In later 1893 Richardson was engaged in quarry service. The steamer made its last quarry trip for the year on October 31, 1893, after which it was expected to have been laid up for overhaul and repairs. Richardson was under a monthly contract to the U.S. Corps of Engineers to tow rock barges from the quarry to the jetties which were under construction at the mouth of Yaquina Bay. For this work, as well as incidental transportation on the bay, the owners of Richardson were paid $500 per month, earning a total of $2000 on the contract. While under the contract, Richardson handled 91 scows laden with a total of 21,887 tons of rock, for jetty construction. The quarry was located at Mill Creek, on the Yaquina River, about 12 miles up from Newport. The government had rented the quarry from C.H. Williams for an annual rental of $325 per year.

Later, in April 1897 the steamer was reported to be engaged in transporting building stone from the Rochester quarry to Newport, to be transshipped to San Francisco.

== Ownership dispute ==
In May 1895 there was a dispute between two parties, Moss and Richardson, over ownership of the steamer. Testimony in the dispute was taken at Newport on Tuesday, May 28, 1895 before Referee J. Fred Yates. An earlier report, from February 22, 1894, was that there was a good chance that litigation would arise over the steamer Richardson, with a silent partner in the boat demanding an accounting and a settlement. On October 4, 1895, a writ of attachment, in the amount of $319, was sworn out at the Lincoln County court against the steamer Richardson, representing attorney’s fees said to be owing by H.A. Moss to A.L. McFadden.

== Operations 1996-1900 ==
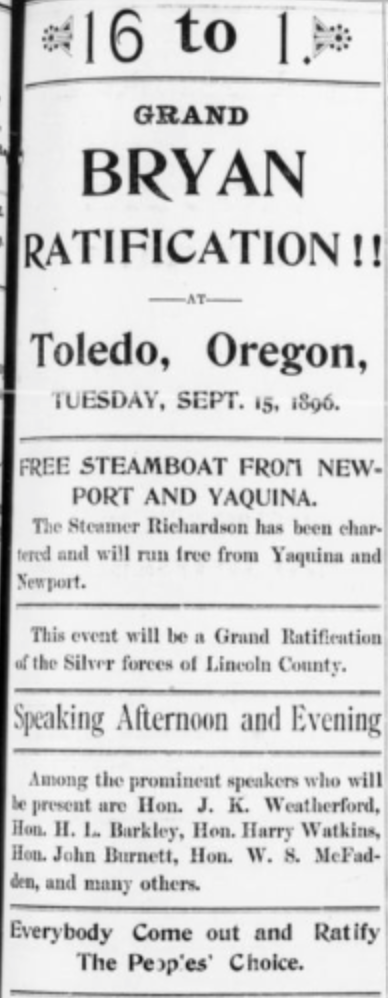
Advertisement for rally for William Jennings Bryan.

In March 1896, Richardson took the place of the steamer Volante, caring passengers, mail and mail and freight between Newport and Yaquina City, after Volante was destroyed by fire.

In the summer of 1896, Richardson was involved in a collision with the much larger ocean-going steamer Farallon, which left Richardson with a smashed guard rail. On Tuesday, July 21, 1896, Richardson was brought up to the gridiron (a form of drydock) at Toledo to have the guard rail repaired, and to be repainted and have other repairs.

In September 1896, the Richardson was chartered by the “Silver forces of Lincoln County for a “Grand Bryan Ratification” to occur on Tuesday, September 15, 1896. The rally was held at Toledo, Oregon. Richardson transported over one hundred people from Newport and Yaquina City. The steamer Mascot also brought in a crowd of Bryan supporters from Elk City. According to a newspaper report, “speaking commenced at 2:30 at the courthouse, first by Hon. J.K. Weatherford, of Albany, who poured in hot shot for Bryan and free silver for an hour and a half.”

In the fall of 1896, Richardson was employed on the lower Yaquina river transporting fish for a cannery at Newport. By October 15, 1896, Richardson was tied up to the dock at Toledo, under the care of the purser, Charley Jahn. The vessel was back in operation by December 31, 1896, when it transported passengers from Newport, Yaquina City, and Toledo to Elk City for a dance.

In February 1897, it was reported that the Western Transportation Company had purchased the T.M. Richardson, and intended to place the vessel on the Newport-Yaquina City route. This would make Richardson the only steamboat on the route, and represented a return to the route, by Richardson, after a “long lay-off”.

In the third week of October 1898, Charley Emigh, mate of the Richardson, fell on deck and landed on a piece of equipment, breaking two ribs.

The steamer Richardson came up to Toledo on the morning of March 10, 1899 to pick up a load of hay.

On May 18, 1900, Richardson was reported to be back in operation, having been in dry dock for repairs.

== Operations 1901-1904 ==
In the summer of 1902, the Richardson, under Captain M.M. Davis, a resident of Newport, operated between Newport and the railhead at Yaquina, where passengers from inland points would detrain for transport by water to the ocean resorts. Captain Davis had built a passenger-carrying barge to be lashed on to the steamer, and with it, he said the vessel could transport 500 people at once. The 1902 summer season was reported to have been the best for the seaside resorts since the summer of 1897. A later critic of the Richardson, B.F. Jones, stated that even in the best condition, the steamer was never licensed to carry more than 100 persons.,

On September 19, 1903, T.M. Richardson stranded on a bar in the Yaquina River while en route to Newport. Two surfmen from the U.S. Life-Saving Service station at Yaquina Bay reached the Richardson in a small boat. They were able to take off all 28 passengers, as well as the mail and express items. At high tide the vessel was refloated.

In 1904, Newport, Oregon was a small resort community with a year-round population of about 300 people living in the county. Yaquina City was about three miles (5 km) up Yaquina Bay. In 1904 T.M. Richardson spent most of its time running between Newport and Yaquina City.

In 1904, T.M. Richardson was the only steamboat in service on Yaquina Bay, although there were three or four gasoline launches operating on the Yaquina River. The rail terminus from the Willamette Valley was at Yaquina City, and with no roads to cover the six mile (10 km) distance to Newport, the only effective access was by water.

T.M. Richardson continued to be used on this route, often with a barge lashed alongside, to carry additional passengers or baggage.

== New ownership ==
In late 1904, John Marshall and Charles Rivears, two Columbia River steamboat men, and their associates, acquired the steamers and the business of the Western Transportation Company, including the Richardson. Marshall had been the chief engineer on the Columbia river sternwheeler Ocklahama. Reported to have been a wealthy man, Marshall was the uncle of William Marshall, who owned an interest in the former Willamette River sternwheeler Leona, which was then in service on the route between Portland and the Lewis River, in southwestern Washington state.

Both Marshall and Rivears had left the Columbia river steamboat business after a strike in 1902. The new company intended to bring a large steam launch onto Yaquina Bay, and operate it there. The new company also intended to build a new steamer to take the place of the Richardson.

== Last years ==
On May 11, 1906, it was reported that two steamboat inspectors, Edwards and Fuller, would depart the following day from Portland for Yaquina City, to inspect the T.M. Richardson.

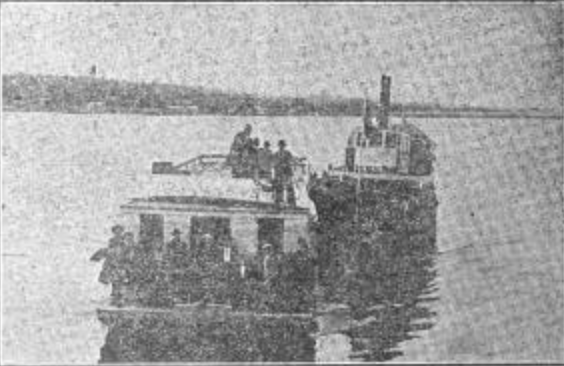
T.M. Richardson, with passenger barge, June 1907 or earlier.

For most of the summer of 1907, T.M. Richardson was out of operation undergoing repairs. Richardson had broken its propeller shaft. This was not the only time that Richardson had been out of service during the summer of 1907.

Richardson was replaced on the route by the gasoline launch Gazelle, which arrived at Yaquina Bay from Portland on Saturday, August 3, 1907. (Gazelle was also expected to be used on fishing expeditions in the open ocean off of Yaquina Bay.) According to a critic of the Richardson, the gasoline launches towed the “same old boathouse scow that the Richardson tows when it is able to navigate.”

By late September 1907, Richardson had been returned to service and was making runs between Newport and Yaquina City, where it met the trains of the Corvallis and Eastern Railroad.

In August 1907, Richardson was being run by Captain Jacobson. The steamer was criticized, in that year, by B.F. Jones, who held a captain’s license and was familiar with marine transportation on Yaquina Bay.

== Replacement ==
In 1908, T.M. Richardson was replaced by a new vessel, the Newport (72 ft (21.95 m), 81 gross tons). The Newport-Yaquina City route was also purchased by Jack Fogarty and Capt. Jacobson from Capt. Chatterton. The boiler from Richardson was to be placed in the new steamer, Newport, which was built at Yaquina City to replace Richardson.

== See also ==
- Steamboats of the Oregon Coast
- Steamboats of Yaquina Bay and Yaquina River
