= Bayocean (motor yacht) =

Motor yacht and US Navy patrol craft

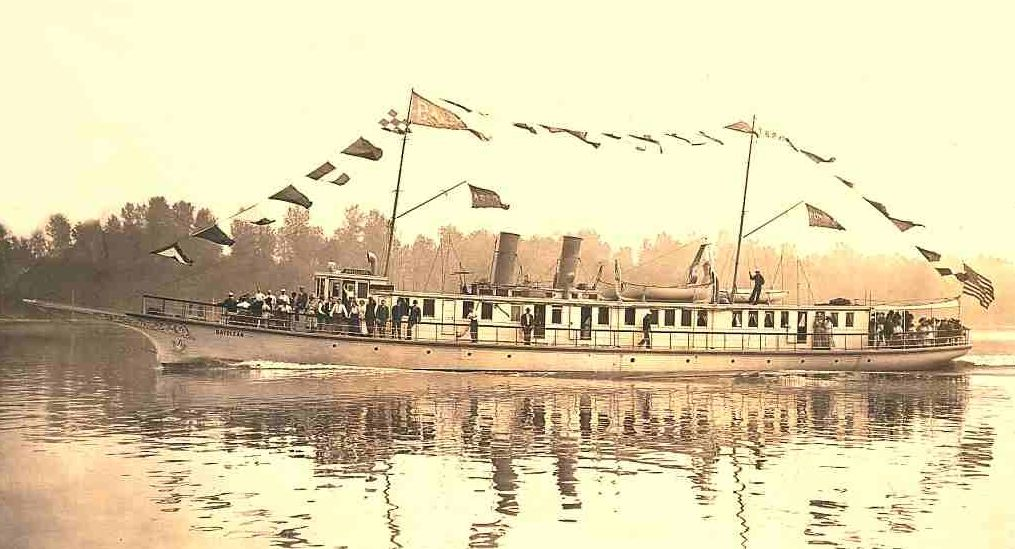
- BayOcean sometime between May 1911 and May 1913, probably on the Willamette River.

History

United States
- Name: Bayocean
- Owner: 1912: TB Potter Realty; 1914: Bayocean Excursion Co
- Port of registry: 1912: Portland, OR; 1914: San Francisco
- Builder: Joseph Supple, Portland, Oregon
- Cost: $40,000 or $50,000 (reports vary)
- Launched: May 27, 1911
- In service: 1911
- Identification: 1912: US official number 208705; 1912: code letters LBWD; 1918: US Navy number 2640
- Fate: Sold 1921

General characteristics
- Type: Coastal passenger, later, naval patrol
- Tonnage: 114 GRT, 87 NRT
- Length: 130.1 ft (39.65 m)
- Beam: 18.7 ft (5.70 m)
- Depth: 7.9 ft (2.41 m) depth of hold
- Decks: one
- Installed power: triple gasoline engines
- Propulsion: triple propeller
- Complement: in naval service: 25
- Crew: as yacht: 7 to 10
- Armament: 1918: 2 × 3-pounder guns

Bayocean was a yacht that was built in 1911 to serve the now-vanished resort of Bayocean on the coast of Oregon at the entrance to Tillamook Bay. Considered an attractive vessel with a clipper bow and twin raked smokestacks, Bayocean was expensive to operate, was "somewhat cranky" at sea, and spent much of the time tied to a dock. In 1913, Bayocean then transferred to San Francisco Bay where it served briefly as an excursion vessel. In 1918, Bayocean was purchased by the U.S. Navy and converted to a patrol vessel. Following a brief active career, Bayocean was laid up again for about two years, as the Navy demobilized and sought to find buyers for its surplus ships. In 1921, the Navy sold Bayocean at auction to the San Francisco concern of Crowley Launch and Tug, now Crowley Maritime.

== Design and construction ==
=== Design ===
On February 25, 1911, final papers authorizing the construction of Bayocean were signed by Joseph Supple and T.B. Potter. Supple and the yacht's designer, Fred Ballin decided the same day on orders for special parts to be manufactured in the east. The T.B. Potter Realty Company, with an office at 720 Corbett Street in Portland, Oregon, would be the owners of the yacht.

On February 25, some construction details relating to the planking of the bow and stern still remained to be worked out, but the hull lines of the vessel were ready to be laid out. The yacht was to be built at Supple's shipyard on the Willamette River at the foot of east Belmont Street, in Portland, Oregon. It was necessary to tear out the wall of one of the sheds at the Supple yard to make room for the yacht's construction. Supple planned to launch the boat, once engines had been installed, stern first, with the launching to occur if possible before May 15, before the water in the Willamette river could rise as it usually did in a freshet in June.

=== Construction ===
Work began on Friday, March 10, 1911. The keel was scheduled to be laid the next day. The anticipated completion date had been rolled back to June 1, 1911. By May 2, 1911, the machinery had been installed on the yacht, and Supple had put a large force of workmen on the job to complete the vessel by the contract deadline of June 1, 1911.

=== Launch ===
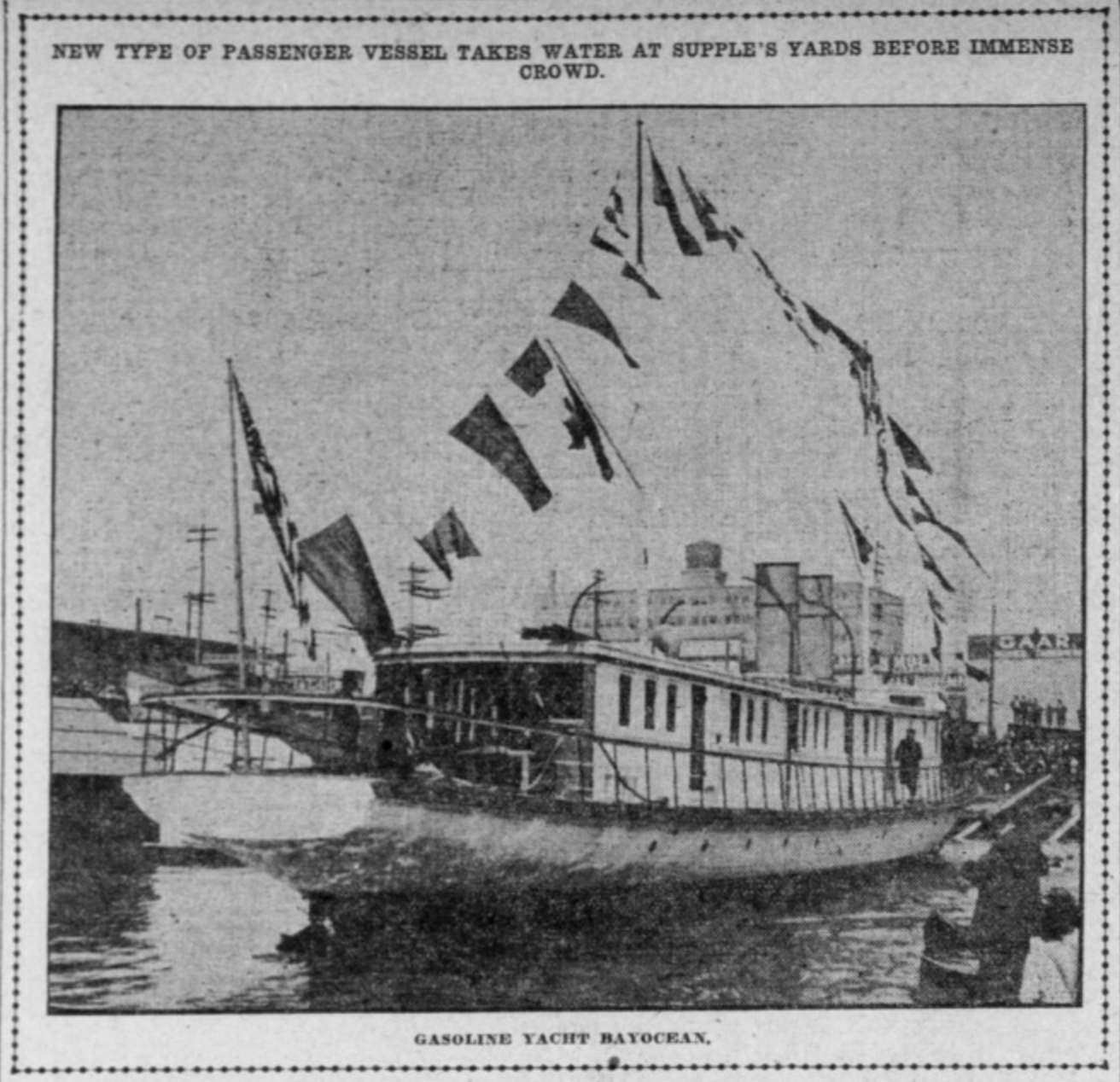
Launch of Bayocean

On May 12, 1911, it was announced that the launching of Bayocean was to take place the next day, Saturday, May 12. The yacht was to be completely white in color. On May 12, the hull was then being painted, and the upper works had already received the first coat. it was anticipated that the vessel would be complete by June 1, the contracted delivery date to the owners, or a few days later.

The May 13 launch was rescheduled to May 27, 1911, at 1:30 pm. The programme for the event promised speeches by Portland Mayor Simon and harbormaster Speier. Launch did come, on the afternoon of May 27, 1911, when, at a few minutes after 3:00 pm, Bayocean was launched into the water "with the ease and grace of a duck." A bottle of champagne had been tied to blue and white silk streamers, and when five-year-old Elizabeth Potter let go off the streamers, the bottle crashed directly on to the bow of Bayocean, breaking into dozens of pieces. Joseph Supple gave the command "Cut the line", and the yacht slid into the river.

The launch programme had been directed by the Portland Ad Men's club, with Tom Richardson as master of ceremonies. There were a large number of spectators, which according to a report of the event, formed the "largest crowd to view a launching in the history of local maritime affairs." The crowd took over every place in the vicinity from which the launch could be seen, including the Supple yard, the roofs of neighboring buildings, and the east approach of the Morrison Bridge. Besides Tom Richardson, other speakers at the event included Harbormaster Speier, Portland mayor Simon, Judge Van Zant, representing Governor of Oregon Oswald West (1873–1960, David N. Mosessohn (b.1883), president of the Portland Ad Men's club, and T. Irving Potter, vice-president of the yacht's owners, the T.B. Potter Realty Company,

=== Specifications ===
Upon completion, Bayocean was 130.1 ft (39.65 m) long, with a beam of 18.7 ft (5.70 m) and depth of hold of 7.9 ft (2.41 m). Her tonnages were 148 GRT and 87 NRT. Her US Registry official number was 208705, As an ocean-going vessel, Bayocean's code letters were LBWD. She was registered in Portland.

There were stateroom accommodations below decks for 44 passengers and 14 members of the crew. The cabin above the deck housed the traveller's lounge (called a "saloon"), the galley, bath, and owner's quarters. The T.B. Potter Realty Company advertised that Bayocean cost $50,000 to construct. Other reports differ, with one saying the yacht had cost "over $40,000", and another giving the cost as simply $40,000.

Bayocean was intended to carry about 100 passengers, with accommodations for 40 persons in staterooms. Reports on crew size differed, with one report prior to launch stating there would be ten men in the crew. and another in 1913 giving the figure of seven. The crew were attired on uniforms.

=== Power plant ===
The yacht would be driven by three gasoline engines turning three propellers. These engines together generated either 475 or 500 horsepower. Designer Ballin believed the yacht could be run economically at low speed by running only a single engine. As of 1921, Bayocean was reported to have been powered by three 6-cylinder, 4-cycle Speedway engines, apparently the ones originally installed, generating 500 indicated horsepower. The center engine was slightly more powerful with cylinder dimensions of 9 inch diameter with 11.5 inch stroke, generating 175 horsepower, with the ones on the side having cylinder dimensions of 7.5 inch diameter with 9 inch stroke producing 150 horsepower each. The engines, air-starting and reversing, were all six-cylinder types, built by the Gas Engine and Power Company, under the Speedway patent, and furnished by the Rober Machinery Company, were guaranteed to drive the yacht at a speed of 17 miles (15 nautical miles) per hour. Bayocean had an auxiliary engine to generate electric power for the lighting system, working the pumps for the bilge and fire protection, and supplying air pressure.

=== Preparation for service ===
Bayocean was not ready for service upon launch. Among other things, the engines were not yet connected to the propeller shafts. Also, Bayocean could not legally transport paying passengers until a certificate was issued by the United States Steamboat Inspection Service. Local inspectors Fuller and Edwards refused to grant an approval certificate to Bayocean until certain changes, characterized as "minor" in a news report, had been made. These changes included installing ventilators to the engine room, providing an access route (called a "companionway") forward of the pilot house, and other modifications.

Publicity type of events were undertaken prior to entry into formal service. On May 31, 1911, Bayocean's owners offered a free trip to Tillamook Bay and back, any time during that summer, for the person who could present to the company the best photograph of the launching of the yacht, provided they also made available the negative on demand for the company's publicity use.

The yacht was involved in the 1911 Portland Rose Festival. On Monday, June 5, 1911, leading a flotilla of motor boats from the Astoria Motorboat Club in a river parade, Bayocean acted as the "King's Barge" for "Rex Oregonus", the titular head of the Rose Festival.

In the week of June 1, 1911, Bayocean was used as the flagship for the Oregon state championship swimming races, to be held Friday, June 9, at a course in the Willamette Riverof the dock of the Portland Railway, Light, and Power Company, upriver from the Hawthorne Bridge. The races, which were sponsored by the Multnomah Amateur Athletic Club, were scheduled to start at 2:00 pm, with Bayocean picking up the board of directors of the club, and their wives and friends at 1:00 pm at the Joseph Supple dock, and then proceeding to a position along the race course.

== Operations in Oregon ==
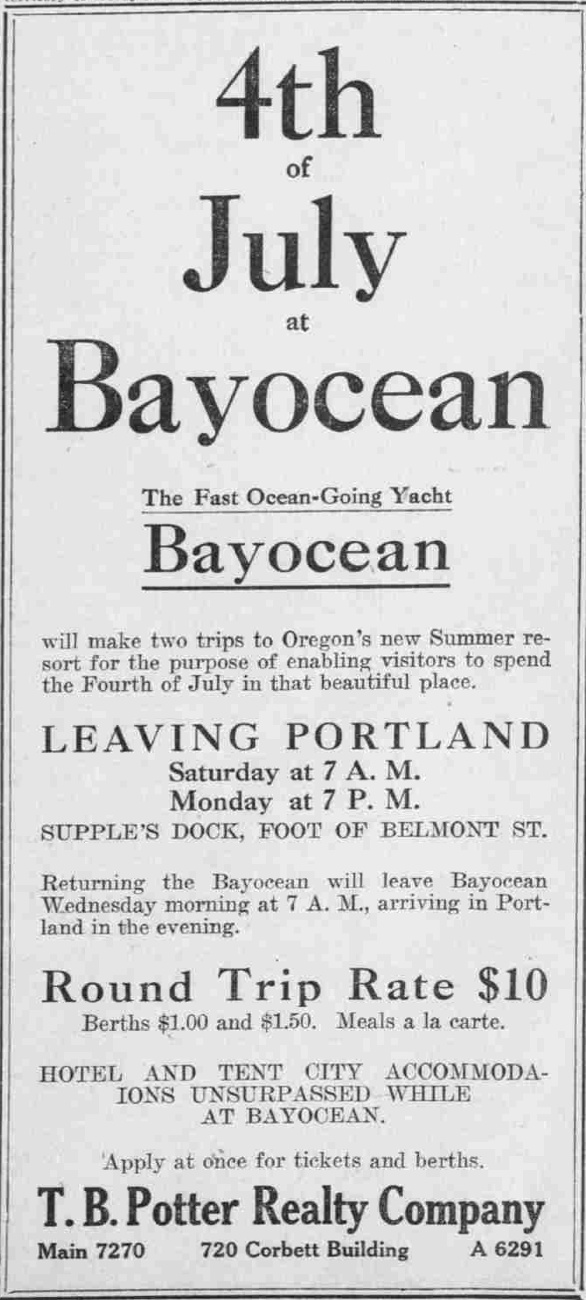
Advertisement for Bayocean excursion cruise, placed in Morning Oregonian, on June 30, 1911.

=== Summer of 1911 ===
The plan for operation of the yacht was to leave Portland at night, so that the Columbia River bar could be crossed during the daylight of early morning. The return to Portland would be made during the daylight, with a stop at Astoria, so that passengers who wished could disembark and take the train back to Portland. It was intended to make the run from Portland to Tillamook three times per week. At the yacht's anticipated speed of 18 miles per hour, was about a four-hour sea voyage from the mouth of the Columbia river to the wharf at Bay Ocean.

Bayocean made its first ocean trip in June 1911. The yacht left Portland at dawn on Sunday June 18, 1911, and reached the Bayocean resort in just over 12 hours. Speeds of 16 and 17 knots were reached when the vessel was under full power. On board were T. Irving Potter, of Potter Realty Company, Fred A. Ballin, Joseph Supple, and a number other guests.

On Friday, June 30, 1911, when Bayocean was returning from Tillamook, hot bearing in the main engine, attributed to improper work by an oiler, forced it to stop overnight at Rainier, Oregon, only reaching Portland the next morning.

=== Summer of 1912 ===
Bayocean in service, possibly on the Oregon coast.

After the summer of 1911, Bayocean was out of service and moored in Tillamook Bay until late May 1912, when the yacht was taken to Portland for an overhaul at the Supple yard where the boat had been launched the year before. By June 1912, Bayocean was returned to service, being scheduled to make an excursion to Garibaldi and the Bayocean resort on June 25, 1912. The promoters had originally charged $20 and had touted the trip as an industrial and businessman's excursion, but then lowered the price to $12.50 and recharacterize the trip as a jaunt.

In March 1912, the company, through a newly hired resort manager, was announcing that Bayocean would be available for visitors for "deep sea fishing trips and moonlight excursions" during the summer season. There would soon no longer be any need to use the yacht to transport resort guests from Portland, because a rail line, called the "Lytle Road" had been completed by the Southern Pacific from Portland, across the coast mountain range, and into Tillamook, a distance of 85 miles. The T.B. Potter Realty Company and the railroad would cooperate to advertise the resort and rail travel to it during the forthcoming summer.

By early June 1912, rail service to Garibaldi had been established, with a special excursion train planned to depart Portland at 9:00 am on June 27, and arriving in Garibaldi at 2:30 pm the same day, considerably faster than transport by water. Excursionists arriving by rail would be taken over to Bayocean resort in launches. In 1912, Bayocean did not run on the Portland-Tillamook Bay route as it had done during 1911, prior to the establishment of the rail link to Garibaldi. The yacht was made available for deep sea fishing side-trips by the excursionists arriving by train.

Bayocean was present in Portland on June 11, 1912, to lead the Rose Festival Parade of Ships. As with the 1911 Rose Festival, T.B. Potter lent Bayocean to accommodate the women officers of the Multnomah Club who were involved in the Oregon State Swimming Championship.

By late July 1912, large crowds of people were taking the train to Garibaldi to reach the Bayocean resort. To accommodate the crowd, the resort organized a ferry service to carry people from Garibaldi across the bay to Bayocean. According to one non-contemporaneous report, Bayocean was used as a ferry between Garibaldi and the resort. However, a more timely account states that the yacht was too big to maneuver well in the shallow waters of the bay. Instead the task of ferrying was assigned to the much smaller yacht Henrietta (28 feet long, passenger capacity: 30), brought in from the city of Tillamook and operating under Captain Emmett Jenkins.

== Transfer to California ==
=== Reasons for sale ===
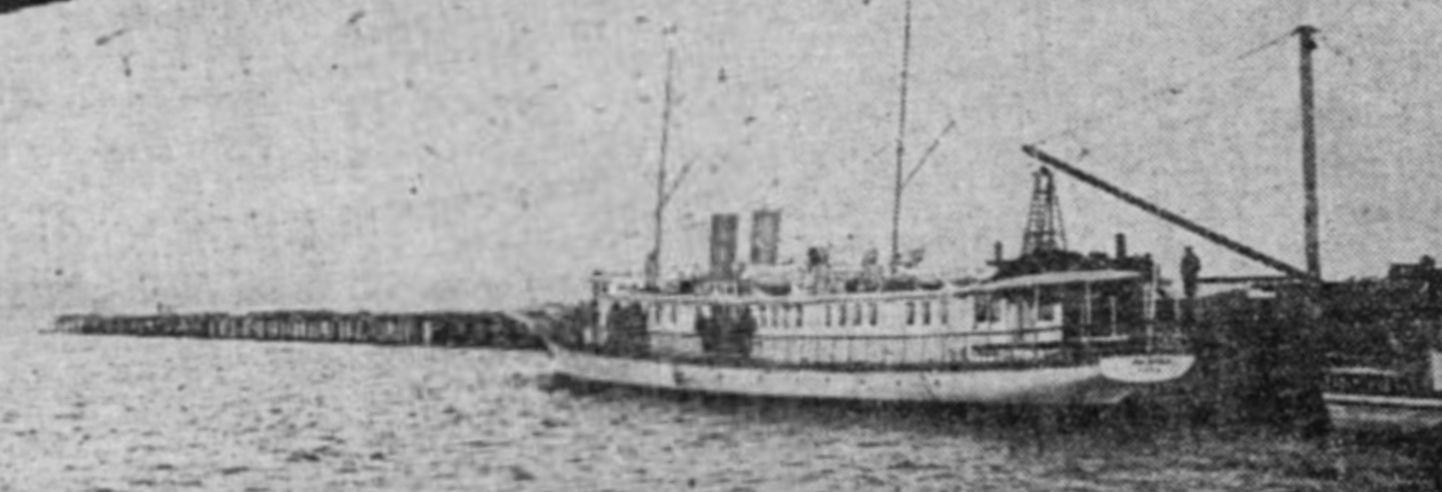
Bayocean at the Bayocean wharf on Tillamook Bay, June 1911. Bayocean spent most of its time in Oregon tied up to this dock.

According to one report, Bayocean was said by mariners to be "an excellent sea boat." Another source states that the yacht was "somewhat cranky for coastwise service." The yacht was expensive to operate. By 1913, Bayocean had been used to carry passengers from Portland to the Bayocean resort for just one season, that of 1911, and the cost was too great to continue.

One element of cost was the annual tax assessment from Multnomah County, which was $7,500 in 1913. By comparison, an entire smaller steamboat, the Truant (60 feet long, 33 gross tons), was built not far from Tillamook Bay, in Toledo, Oregon in 1910 for $6,000.

An alternative plan, to run from Astoria to Tillamook was tried, but this did not work out and for some time prior to January 1913, the yacht had been out of service and moored at Bayocean.

=== Deal is reached ===
In January 1913 it was reported that negotiations for the sale of Bayocean might open soon with a resident of southern California who was considering running a vessel from San Diego to ports in northern Mexico during the summer.

On Friday, March 21, 1913, Potter Realty Co. sold Bayocean to the Bayocean Excursion Company, a California-based concern organized by shareholders of the North Pacific Steamship Company. The new owners were seeking vessels to use in connection with the Panama–Pacific International Exposition to be held in San Francisco in 1915. At the time of the sale, Bayocean was at the Bayocean resort dock in Tillamook Bay, where the yacht had been wintered since the 1911 summer tourist season. The transfer to California was expected to take place about a month after the sale, or as soon as weather conditions became favorable. The new owners registered Bayocean in San Francisco.

The new owners were seeking other vessels for use as ferries to the exposition, and according to one report, "many vessels held along the Coast for want of a suitable route will no doubt find their way south." The newspaper account of the sale mentioned the Victorian, a notorious white elephant, then in Puget Sound, as a possible vessel to be acquired.

The Potter Realty Company sold Bayocean to a corporation organized by San Francisco resident H.J. Cocoran, who had formerly been associated with North Pacific Steamship Co. Cocoran was seeking vessels for use in the 1915 fair in San Francisco.

=== Voyage to California ===
On April 3, 1913, Captain James J. Rudden sent a telegram from Bayocean resort to Portland, stating that the yacht had loaded a "plentiful supply" of gasoline on board, that he expected to leave port the next, and would proceed direct to San Francisco without stopping at any port en route. Bayocean departed a few days later, on April 6, 1913, with Captain Rudden in command, J. Oligreen as first officer, and Frank Coulter, chief engineer. The weather was stormy and there was a heavy sea, but the yacht was making good speed when last seen from Bayocean resort. Bayocean arrived in San Francisco on Tuesday, April 8, 1913, at 10:35 pm, having spent 60 hours en route from Tillamook.

== Service on San Francisco Bay ==
In April 1913, Captain Rudden was superseded as master of Bayocean by Capt. Charles McNeill Jr. In May 1913, Bayocean was making sightseeing excursions twice daily in the San Francisco Bay. However, there appears to be no record of any activity by Bayocean in any civilian capacity after mid-1913, and it may have been the vessel was laid up after that time.

== Government service ==
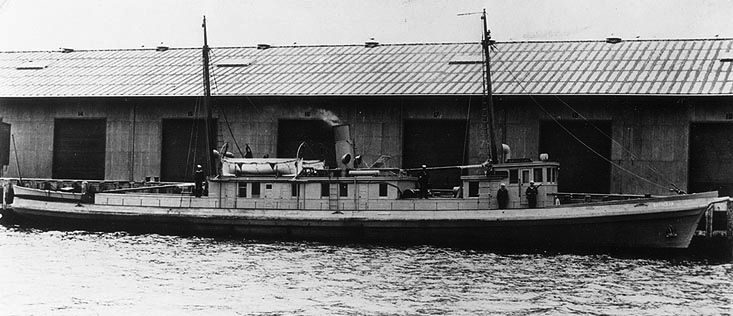
Bayocean in naval service, between 1918 and 1920. Four sentries are visible in this image, one nearest the bow carries a rifle.

=== Bought by Navy ===
After the entry of the United States into World War I in 1917, the US Navy purchased a number of large private yachts, including Bayocean, for use as patrol vessels. On April 27, 1918, Bayocean was inspected and found suitable for naval use. The Naval paid $52,500 for Bayocean. Bayocean was delivered to the Navy in June, 1918.

=== Naval operations ===
On April 27, 1918, Bayoean was inspected and found suitable for naval use. On June 24, 1918, the Navy bought Bayocean from J.T. Bunn of San Diego, California. Navy identification number 2640 was assigned to the yacht. Bayocean then proceeded from San Diego to the Mare Island Navy Yard, where the vessel was commissioned on August 16, 1918. During naval service, Bayocean had a complement of 25 and was armed with two 3-pounder guns.

Bayocean was then ordered to San Diego, California to report to Commander, Division 2, Pacific Fleet, for "such duty as may be assigned." On September 12, 1918, following repairs and trial runs, the yacht was moored at the Municipal Pier in San Diego. For over a month afterwards, Bayocean operated in the San Diego area, conducting drills, running engineering trials, and carrying mail. On October 19, 1918, the yacht was docked for repairs, where it remained until November 7, 1918. The yacht was in port at the time of the armistice on 11 November 1918.

On November 19, 1918 Bayocean was dispatched to the Pacific coast of Mexico, reaching Pichilinque, on the afternoon November 25, 1918, and delivered mail and supplies to Challenge (SP 1015), Oil Barge No. 9, and the submarine chasers SC 304 and SC 305. Bayocean then received orders to reconnoiter the Gulf of California and to confer and cooperate with the American and British consuls. Thereafter the yacht called at Mazatlan, Manzanillo, Guaymas, and Acapulco, returning to Pichilinque on December 8, 1918. American Vice Consul John R. Gamon boarded Bayocean at Acapulco to begin his return to the United States. On January 20, 1919, Bayocean returned to the United States.

On February 1, 1919, at 12:30 pm, Bayocean got underway for San Francisco Bay, where upon arrival on February 3, 1919, the yacht was docked next to Farragut (Coast Torpedo Boat No. 5). Bayocean was decommissioned on 14 March 1919, and its name was struck from the Navy list on 13 October 1919.

=== Sold by Navy ===
In 1921, Bayocean was offered for sale by auction off by the Navy together with 145 other surplus vessels, including a number of steam and motor yachts which had been taken in for war service. The former yacht was then located in the 12th Naval District, at Mare Island.

The appraised value according to the 1921 Navy auction catalog was $30,000, even though an earlier report, from December, 1919, placed the appraised value at $20,000. The Navy stated it would accept the highest bid above $6,000.

According to one source, Bayocean was purchased by Mr. L. Parker, of Oakland, Calif., on 5 August 1921, and delivered to him on 16 September 1921. Another source reports that Bayocean was acquired by the San Francisco firm of Crowley Launch and Tug, a firm which remains in business today as Crowley Maritime.
