= Truant (disambiguation) =

Truant may refer to:

- HMS Truant (N68), a T-class submarine
- Truant (steamboat), which operated in Oregon, United States, in the 1910s
- truANT, Alien Ant Farm's second album
- Johnny Truant, a character in Mark Z. Danielewski's House of Leaves

== See also ==
- Truancy
