= Mary D. Hume (steamer) =

- U.S. National Register of Historic Places
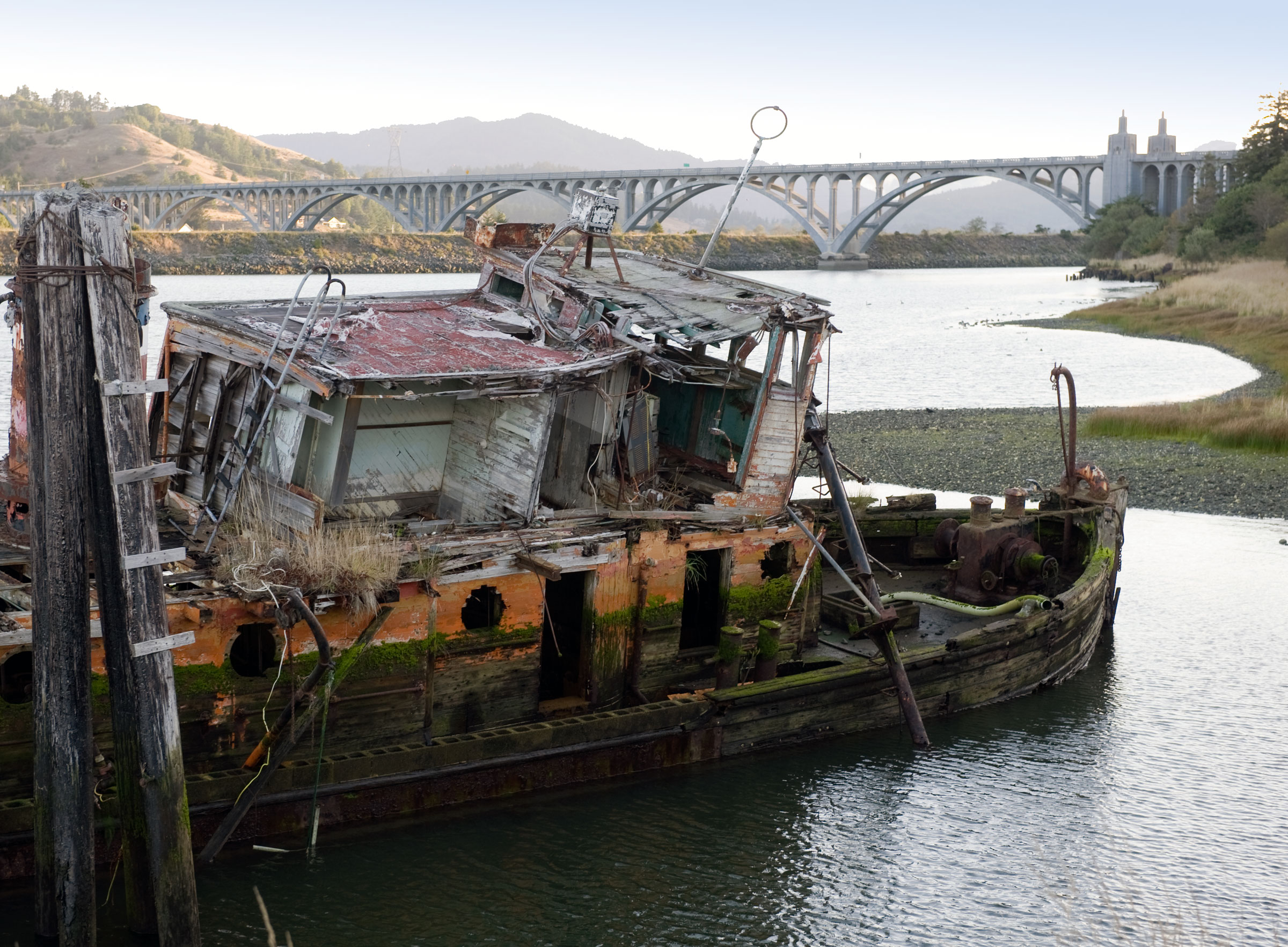
- Mary D. Hume and Isaac Lee Patterson Bridge

- Location within Oregon Location within the United States
- Location: Port of Gold Beach, Gold Beach, Oregon
- Coordinates: 42°25′18″N 124°25′6″W
- Built: 1880
- NRHP reference No.: 79002052
- Added to NRHP: August 01, 1979

The Mary D. Hume was a steamer built at Gold Beach, Oregon in 1881, by R. D. Hume, a pioneer and early businessman in that area. Gold Beach was then called Ellensburg. The Hume had a long career, first hauling goods between Oregon and San Francisco, then as a whaler in Alaska, as a service vessel in the Alaskan cannery trade, then as a tugboat. She was retired in 1977 and returned to Gold Beach. In 1985 she sank in the Rogue River and has remained there ever since as a derelict vessel on the shoreline. The Hume is listed on the National Register of Historic Places.

== Description ==
The Mary D. Hume was built of local timber at Gold Beach. The keel, measuring 10 inches (25 cm) by 36 inches (91 cm) by 140 feet (43 m) long was described as the "largest stick of square timber ever floated down Rogue River." The ship's knees were hand-cut from local Port Orford cedar roots. Planking was secured with wood pegs. The machinery was salvaged from the wrecked steamer Varuna. The Hume measured 150 tons, 96 feet (29 m) long by 22 feet (6.7 m) beam by 9 feet (2.7 m) draft. She was originally rigged as a schooner.

== History ==
R. D. Hume was a pioneering businessman at Wedderburn and Gold Beach, then known as Ellensburg. By 1881, he had established a fish cannery and built Mary D. Hume, to support the cannery operation. Mary D. Hume passed through several owners and a number of changes and reconstructions, and served as late as the 1970s, the oldest serving commercial vessel on the West Coast.

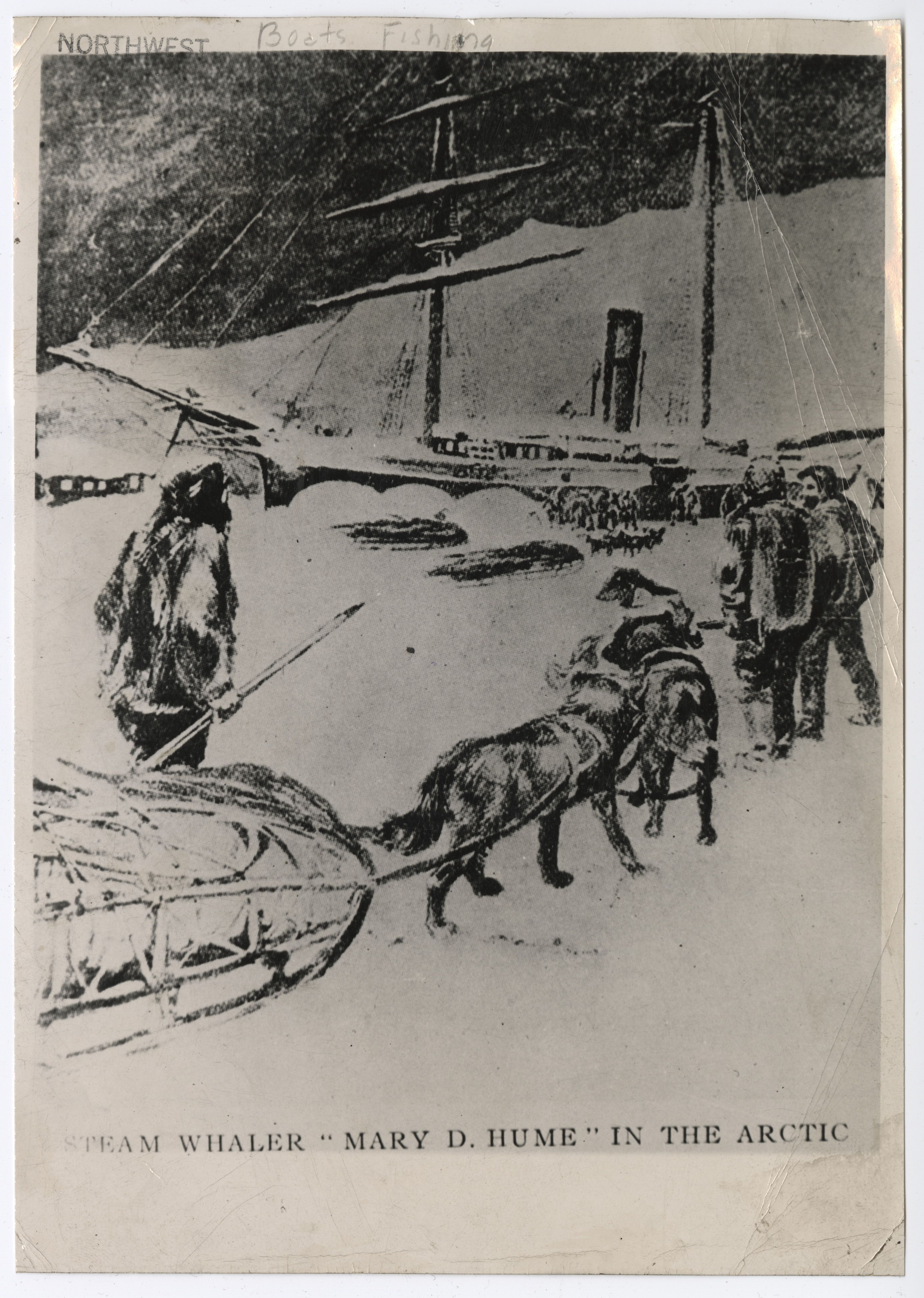
The Mary D. Hume in the Arctic in 1910, rigged as a brigantine.

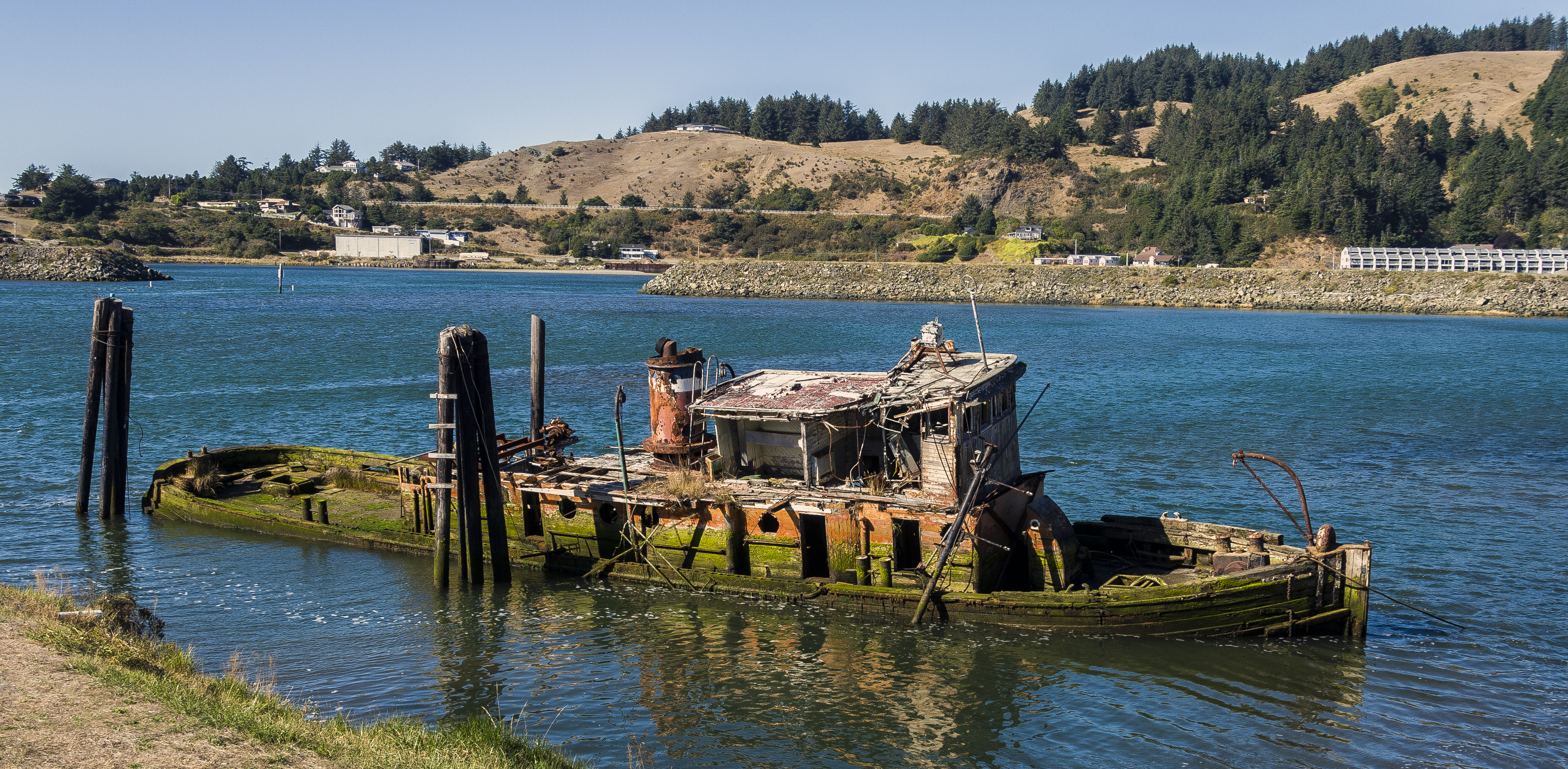
The Mary D. Hume in 2009

The first eight years of the Hume's career were spent hauling cargo between San Francisco and Gold Beach. In 1889 the Hume was bought by the Pacific Steam Whaling Company, to be used to catch whales in the Arctic. She was re-rigged as a brigantine. Her first expedition spanned 1890–1892, catching 37 whales for a cargo worth $400,000. The second voyage lasted from 1893 to 1899, with relief crews sent to Herschel, Canada. In 1900 the Hume became an Alaskan cannery tender for the Northwest Fisheries Company, receiving a new steam engine between 1900 and 1904. After sinking in ice in the Nushagak River she was repaired in Seattle. In either 1906 or 1908 she began work for the American Tug Boat Company of Everett, Washington towing logs and barges on Puget Sound. Her superstructure was altered at this time. A third new engine was installed in 1939, salvaged from the Columbia River lightship. In 1954 a 600 hp diesel engine was installed and the superstructure was altered to its present configuration. In 1973 the Hume was bought by the Crowley Maritime Corporation and was used as a tugboat. She was retired in 1977, and reconditioned by Crowley in 1978 prior to her return to Gold Beach.

== Current wreck ==
An effort was organized to preserve Mary D. Hume as a museum ship, but a mechanical failure caused her to slide off the sling and into the mud at Gold Beach and an unrelated lawsuit over ownership of the vessel dissipated the funds of the Curry County Historical Society which had planned to restore the vessel. Even so, the Mary D. Hume is on the National Register of Historic Places, and her wreck can still be seen in Gold Beach.

The Hume was listed on the National Register of Historic Places on August 1, 1979, when she was afloat and berthed on the Rogue River. Repairs started in 1985, but an accident led to her sinking. Efforts were made to survey and raise her, but there were no funds to make the effort. In 1992 the Hume's status on the National Register was reviewed. The review concluded that her hull still held significance and she was retained on the National Register.

A hand-built model of the Mary D. Hume is currently on display at the Columbia River Maritime Museum in Astoria.

== See also ==
- Steamboats of the Oregon Coast

== Notes and references ==
=== General references ===
- Newell, Gordon R., ed. H.W. McCurdy Marine History of the Pacific Northwest, Superior Publishing, Seattle, WA 1966
