= Truant (steamboat) =

- Truant sometime between 1910 and 1919.

History
- Name: Truant
- Builder: George C. Walker, Toledo, OR
- Cost: Valued at $6,000
- In service: 1910
- Identification: U.S. 206932
- Notes: Wooden hull

General characteristics
- Type: Inland passenger
- Tonnage: 33 gross tons, 29 net tons
- Length: 53.2 ft (16.22 m)
- Beam: 12.4 ft (3.78 m)
- Depth of hold: 4.8 ft (1.46 m)
- Propulsion: steam engine; propeller
- Capacity: 50 passengers
- Crew: two

Truant was a steamboat that was operated in the Yaquina Bay region of Oregon from 1911 to 1919, transporting passengers and freight, and engaging in towing work. After 1919, Truant was transferred to the Columbia River.

== Construction ==
Truant was built by George C. Walker of Toledo, Oregon, for the Modern Improvement Company, also of Toledo.

Truant was launched on Saturday, October 2, 1909. Following the launch, the boat was taken from the yard over to the town of Toledo where the machinery would be installed. The new boat would be about the same size as the Ella May. In early November 1909, the boiler and engine had been installed, while the company was building simultaneously a steam-driven pile driver on a barge. The company was also engaged at the same time in erecting a steam-driven pile driver on a barge.

== Design and power ==
Truant was reported in the press to be 60 feet (18.29 m) long. Truant's official registered dimensions were length of 53.2 feet (16.22 m), beam of 12.4 feet (3.78 m) and 4.8 feet (1.46 m) depth of hold. These dimensions basically match those furnished in 1956 by Truant's owner, Jack Fogarty. Truant's tonnage (a measure of carrying capacity and not of weight) was 33 gross tons and 29 net tons. Total crew required was two.

Power was supplied by a steeple double compound steam engines with cylinders 5 and 10 inches in diameter, with a 6-inch stroke, generating 80 horsepower. There was one Roberts boiler. The value of the boat as constructed was $6,000.

Truant's official merchant vessel registry number was 206932. In 1911 the boat's home port was shown as Yaquina, Oregon.

== Owners ==
As of January 14, 1910, George C. Walker, builder of Truant, was associated with the Modern Improvement Company, the owner of the vessel. On November 29, 1911, as a result of apparently acrimonious disagreements among the shareholders, the Modern Improvement Company was dissolved. The elaborately descriptive dissolution notice stated:

Whereas, this the Modern Improvement Company, has been torn asunder with dissension .and strife, back biting and lying and cross haul in Its multitudinous forms; disagreeing on important as well as trivial matters; rife with Internal disorder generally, and "Whereas, 'A house divided against Itself must fall,' all of the stock holders voted unanimously in favor of dissolution. "Be it resolved that we do dissolve, fall, disband, disintegrate, evaporate and disappear this 29th day of November, 1911.

Jack Fogarty, who became owner of the Truant in 1911, lived in Toledo for five years while he operated the boat. In May 1913, Maurice Anderson bought an interest in the towing and pile-driving business of Capt. Jack Fogarty. At the same time, Anderson also become part owner of Truant. The new firm would be known as Fogarty & Anderson.

== Operations ==
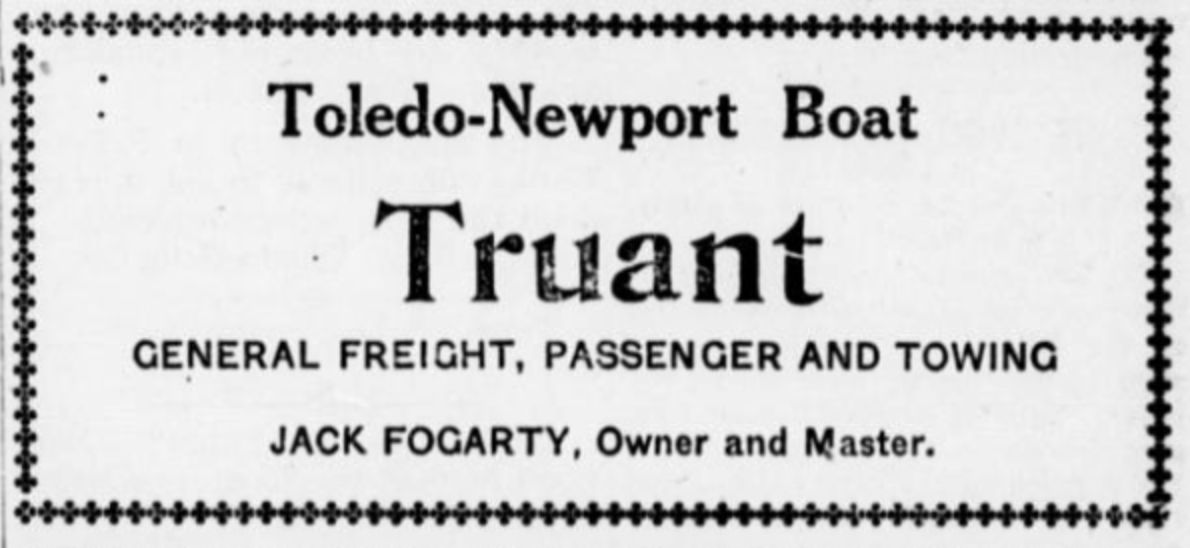
Advertisement for Truant, 1915, showing range of service provided.

Truant was engaged in carrying freight and passengers and doing towing service on Yaquina Bay and river until 1919. On February 11, 1910, the steamboat had been in the vicinity of Elk City, Oregon, for a few days with the company's pile driver.

On Sunday March 6, 1910, Truant carried the committee which was charged with the responsibility of taking the soundings on several sand bars in the river between Toledo and Oysterville, Oregon. The measurements were taken at low tide and were reported to have been “most gratifying.”

Truant's first regular run was scheduled to be an excursion from Toledo to Newport, Oregon on Sunday, April 24, 1910. The steamer was scheduled to leave Toledo at 9 a.m., and depart Newport on the return trip at 6 p.m. The round trip fare would be 50 cents. The owners intended to make regular Sunday excursions to Newport during the coming summer of 1910.

In the first part of the week of December 9, 1910, steamboat inspectors Welden and Ames from Portland were in Toledo and inspected Truant.

In the week prior to October 13, 1916, Truant was at the Hanson shipyard for repairs to be put into “first class shape” for the winter season.

== Grounding ==
On Saturday, May 8, 1910 Truant carried about twenty-five people from Newport up to Toledo for a dance. On the return trip, the boat ran into a dense fog.

At about 2 a.m., the boat ran aground on the south beach of Yaquina Bay. The Yaquina Bay life-saving crew, under the command of Captain Wellendar, heard steam exhausting and went to investigate. They found Truant and with two trips, took off the passengers. There was no damage to the boat and no one was hurt. An ocean navigator, Paul Perkins, had been on board Truant, and he reported that Captain Fogarty had done all he could and remained cool.

The boat itself was not able to get off until the next morning, and was then due at 10 a.m. at Toledo to pick up an excursion bound for Elk City. When Truant came within sight of the waiting crowd at Elk City, the boat broke its propeller shaft.

== Excursions ==
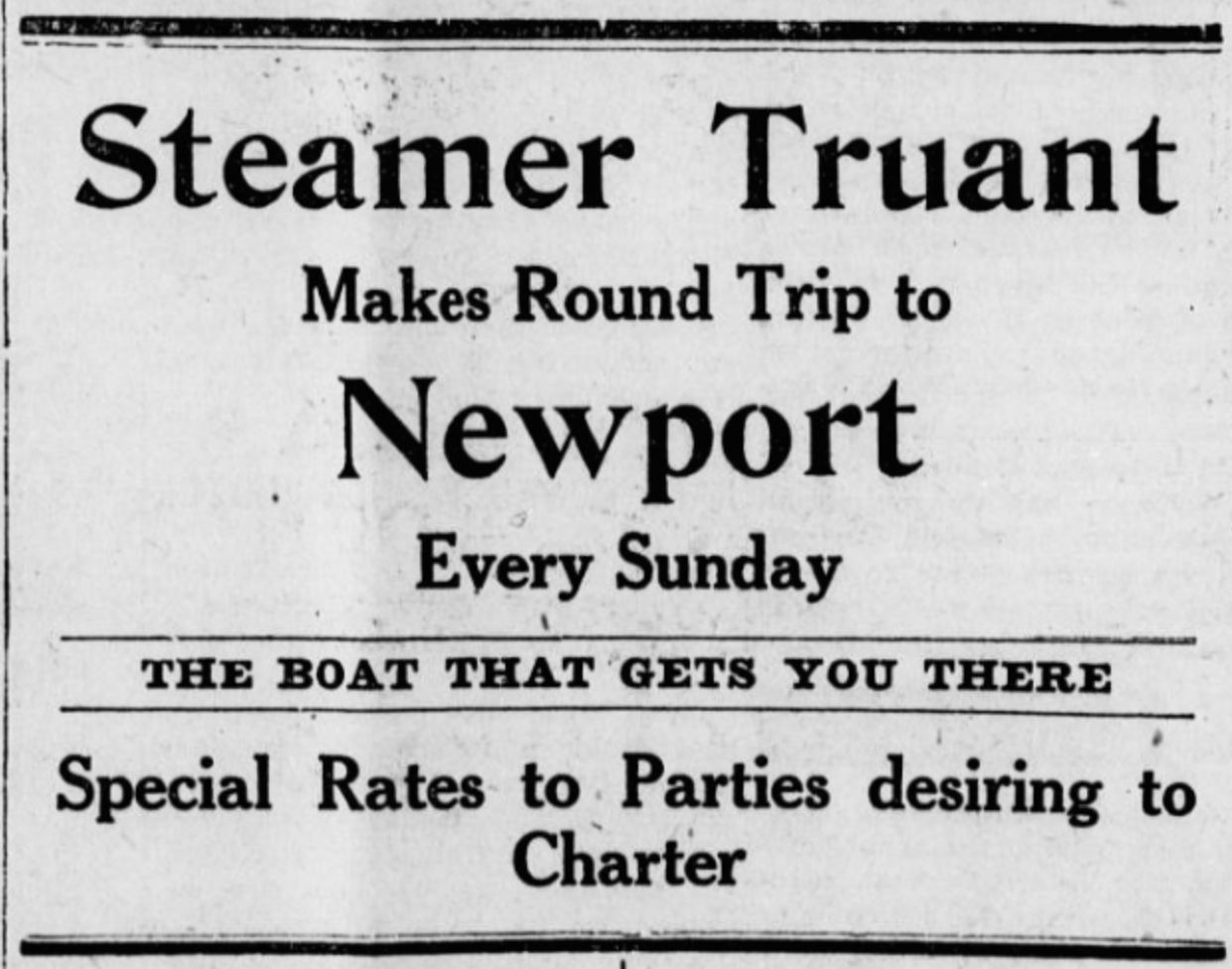
Advertisement for Truant, 1911.

On the Saturday night before June 3, 1910, took over 60 people from Toledo to Newport to watch a boxing match. Because Truant was only licensed to carry 50 passengers, the excess persons were transported on board the launch Chicora and towed behind Truant.

On the Fourth of July, 1910, Truant was scheduled to make extra excursion runs from Toledo to Newport, to leave Toledo at 7 a.m., 12:30 p.m., and 7:30 p.m., and departing Newport for Toledo at 10 a.m., 6 p.m., and immediately after the dance at night. The round trip fare was 75 cents, 25 cents more than the usual Sunday excursion fare to Newport on Truant.

On the Sunday, August 14, 1910, Newport had a large clam bake at which served, by one report, over 2,500 people, and by another report, about 4,000 There was a “vast crowd” which “filled the town to overflowing.” Over 1,000 people had come in to Toledo on a train from the Willamette Valley, and they were transported from there to Newport by Truant, the steamer Newport, and many launches, with Truant itself carrying about 140. To accommodate so many passengers was well beyond the capacity of both Truant and Newport, and so each steamer towed a barge carrying passengers.

== Accident on board ==
Truant, some time between 1910 and 1919.

On the Saturday before July 5, 1912, as Truant was leaving Toledo and headed downriver, engineer Jack Fogarty, who was also one of the owners of the boat, got his arm entangled with the machinery. The cause of the accident appears to have been his sleeve catching on a bolt head. Fogarty's wife was on board, in the cabin. He called out to her for help, but when she attempted to stop the engines, she threw the throttle the wrong way, and increased their speed. She in turn called out to Frank Fogarty, Jack's brother, who was in the pilot house, and he was able to quickly stop the engines. According to one report, Jack Fogarty's arm was badly cut and bruised, and it was thought that he would not be able to return to work for weeks. According to another report, Fogarty's arm was almost pulled from its socket and his right side was seriously injured.

== Salvage of the Frederick ==
On December 13, 1913, the barge Frederick, owned by the Porter Brothers, of Portland was wrecked on the jetty at the entrance to Yaquina Bay and beached. Frederick was carrying 60 tons of dynamite, which was removed and placed onto a smaller barge. During the night, the smaller barge carrying the dynamite broke its moorings. Truant and the steam tug Fearless were on hand and started in pursuit, eventually capturing the loose barge. While this was happening along shore people sought cover against the possible explosion of the dynamite. A few days later Frederick in turn broke its moorings, and sank all the way up to the pilot house of the barge. Another loss occurred during this situation when a scow chartered by the Porter Brothers from Jack Fogarty became jammed and had both ends stove in.

== Later years ==
In about 1919, Truant was converted to a motor vessel, driven by an 80-horsepower Standard gasoline engine. In 1920, Truant was registered as a gasoline-powered vessel, gross tons 26 and net tons 23, with the home port shown as Newport, Oregon. By 1924, the steamboat had been reduced in size to 17 gross and 6 net tons, and was running freight only. In 1925, Truant was registered with a new home port, Portland, Oregon, under the ownership of Herman Loesch, whose office was at 395 East Morrison Street, as the registered owner. This continued to be the case in 1935, although the boat was listed as being used for fishery purposes.

== See also ==
- Steamboats of Yaquina Bay and Yaquina River
