= Steamboats of Yaquina Bay and Yaquina River =

Water transportation history of Oregon, US

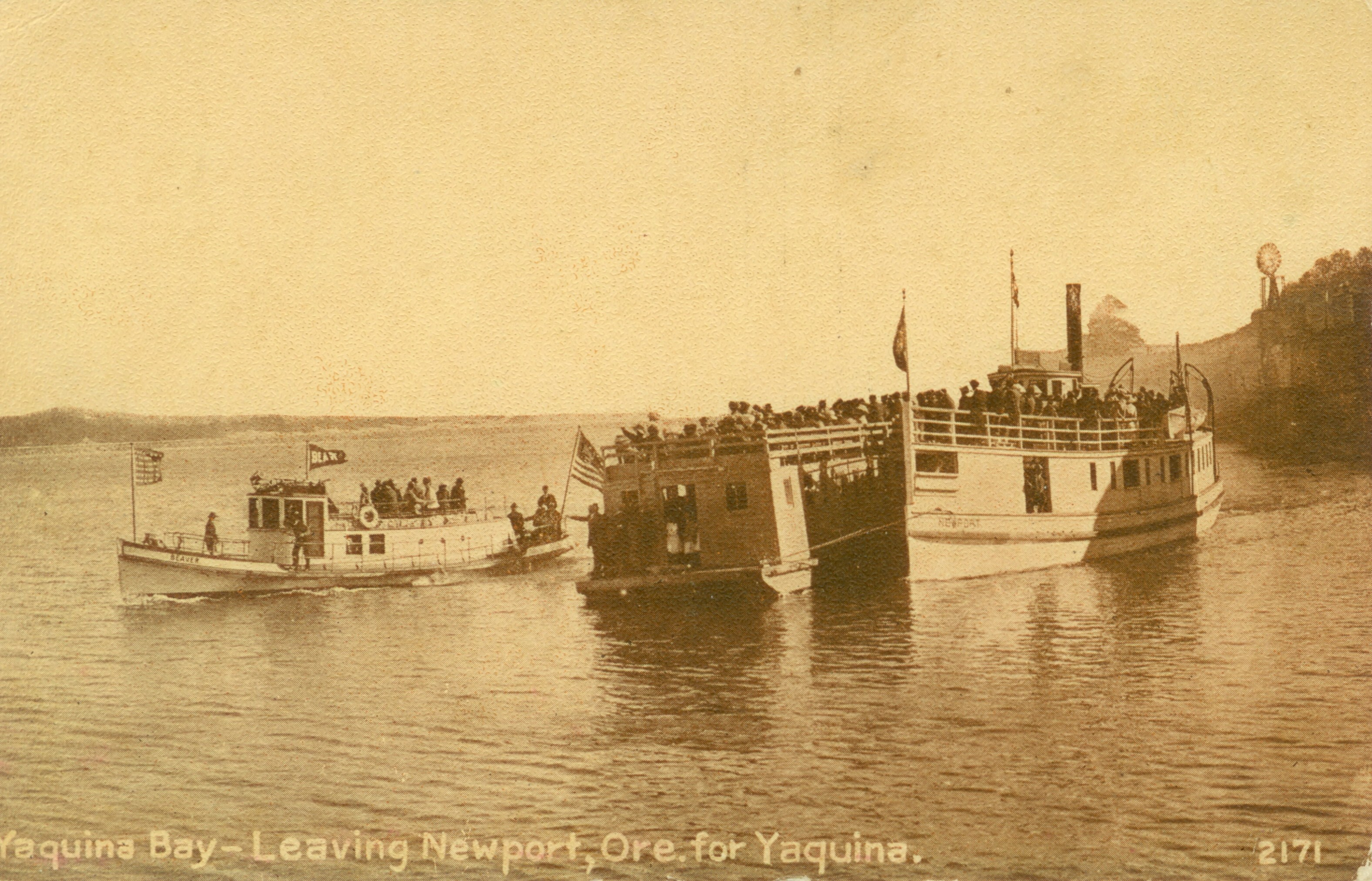
Steamer Newport, with barge lashed on, and launch Beaver departing Newport for Yaquina, c. 1910

Yaquina Bay, like Coos Bay, is a shallow coastal bay on the Oregon Coast in the Pacific Northwest of North America. The principal town on Yaquina Bay is Newport, Oregon. The Yaquina River flows into the bay. Until modern roads reached Newport in the late 1920s, the principal transportation method to and from Newport was by ship or boat.

== Description of waterway ==
The bay entrance is just south and west of Newport. The Yaquina Bay Bridge, designed by Conde McCullough, now carries the Oregon Coast Highway (US 101) across the bay entrance. Before the bridge was built, however, it was necessary to take a ferry to reach the south shore. Just east of Newport on the north side of the bay was a settlement called Olssonville. Further up the bay was the town of Yaquina City. About one mile south of Yaquina City was Oneatta Point, where the bay turned almost due east and became the Yaquina River. Yaquina City was a boom town in the 1880s, when for example in 1887 144 ships cleared the harbor.

Just around the bend of Oneatta Point were the towns of Winant on the north bank and Oysterville on the south. Seagoing ships could come as far up the bay as Yaquina City. About 4 to 5 miles above Yaquina was the town of Toledo, the county seat from 1893 to 1953. Up the river further, nine miles from its mouth, was Elk City, which was the head of navigation on the Yaquina River.

== Early years ==
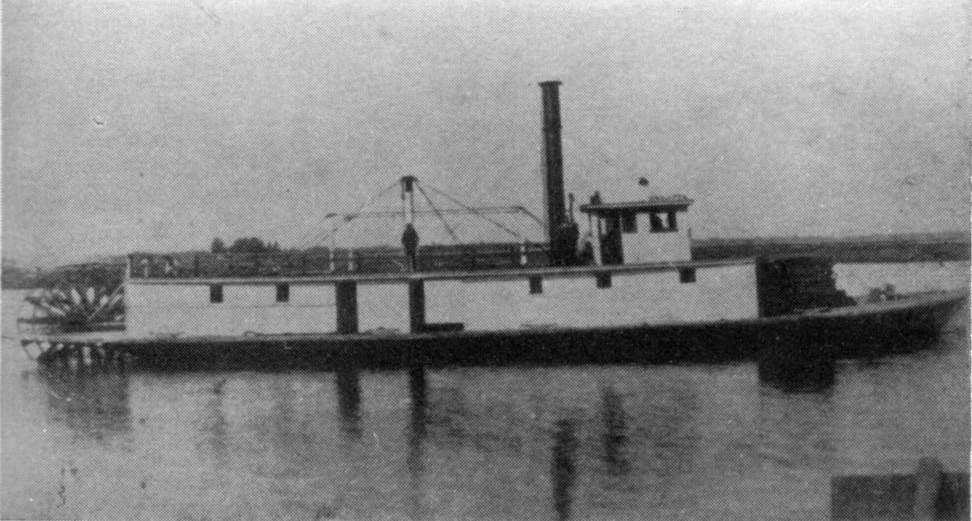
Oneatta c. 1881

The entire Yaquina Bay area (and large portions of the Oregon coast to the north and south) had been set aside in the 1850s as the Coast Indian Reservation. This did not last long, and on January 8, 1866, the Yaquina Bay area was opened up to white settlement.

In 1868, regular mail service was established between Corvallis and Toledo. A stage line was established between Corvallis and Toledo, which ran every Monday, Wednesday, and Friday (and just once weekly during winter mud) taking twelve hours to arrive at Elk City. Once there, travelers would stay overnight in a hotel, then board a steamer bound down river and across the bay to Newport, where a small wharf had been built.

Propeller steamboats did most of this service, however in 1872, the sidewheeler Oneatta was launched at Pioneer, ran on the bay for a while and then was transferred to the Columbia River, then in 1882, to Humboldt Bay. Later, Rebecca C. and Cleveland also ran on Yaquina Bay.

== Sea route to San Francisco ==
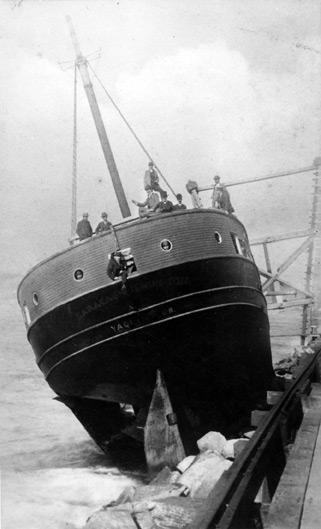
Wreck of Yaquina Bay (ex-Caracas), December 9, 1888.

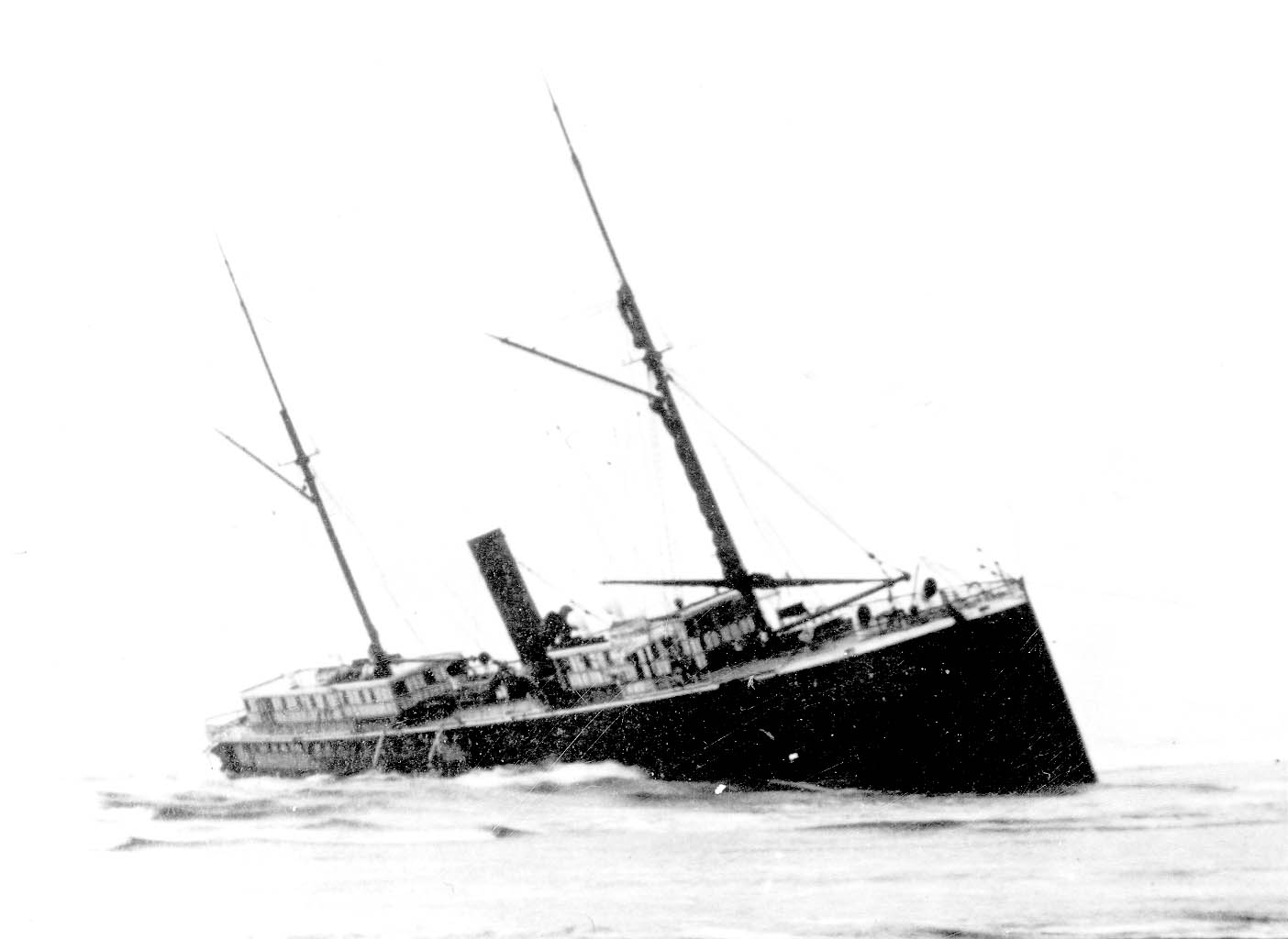
Wreck of Yaquina City, December 4, 1887.

When a survey by the United States Army Corps of Engineers showed the harbor at Yaquina Bay to be deeper than had been supposed, interest in development of the area boomed. In April 1883, the beach front at Newport was enclosed by a bulkhead and filled to form Front Street, the first street in Newport, which effectively functioned as a long pier along the bay front. By 1885, the Oregon Pacific Railroad had been built from the Willamette Valley all the way through to Yaquina City.

Once the railroad reached Yaquina City, boats on Yaquina Bay made daily runs from there to Newport. Normally it took three and a half-days to travel by steamship from Portland to San Francisco, California. By taking the train from Portland to Yaquina City, and boarding a ship there, a traveler could save 40 hours off the trip to San Francisco. While there had been four steamships on this route, one of them, Yaquina City, wrecked on the South Jetty in December 1887, and her replacement, Yaquina Bay, was also wrecked in 1888 on her first trip into the harbor. These wrecks, and financial difficulties for the railroad, left the route unable to compete with the better transportation network centered on Portland. Steamship service to San Francisco ended in the 1890s.

At least one vessel was built at Oneatta, the steam tug Augusta, in 1888.

== Ferries to the south shore ==
Ferries had operated from Newport to the south shore of Yaquina Bay since 1866. They had been privately owned until the 1890s when the City of Newport, and later Lincoln County began giving the ferry a subsidy. In 1913, one Zenas Copeland, owner of the Mud Hen, received a contract to run the ferry route to the south shore. Ferry service continued to the opening of the Yaquina Bay Bridge.

== Rise of tourist business ==
Once the Oregon Pacific Railroad reached Toledo, on the east end of Yaquina Bay, tourists started coming to the bay from the Willamette Valley. The roads were bad or nonexistent at the time, so the only way to the seaside hotels at Newport was to cross the Yaquina Bay by steamer.

On March 7, 1896, the propeller steamer Volante, which had been built at Oneatta in 1892 for the Yaquina Bay service, burned at her mooring at the Newport waterfront. In 1908, the propeller steamer Newport (81) tons was built at Yaquina for Capt. James Chatterton as a replacement for the T.M. Richardson on the Yaquina-Newport run. Later, Jack Fogarty and Capt. Oscar Jacobson bought Newport and the run from Capt. Chatterson.

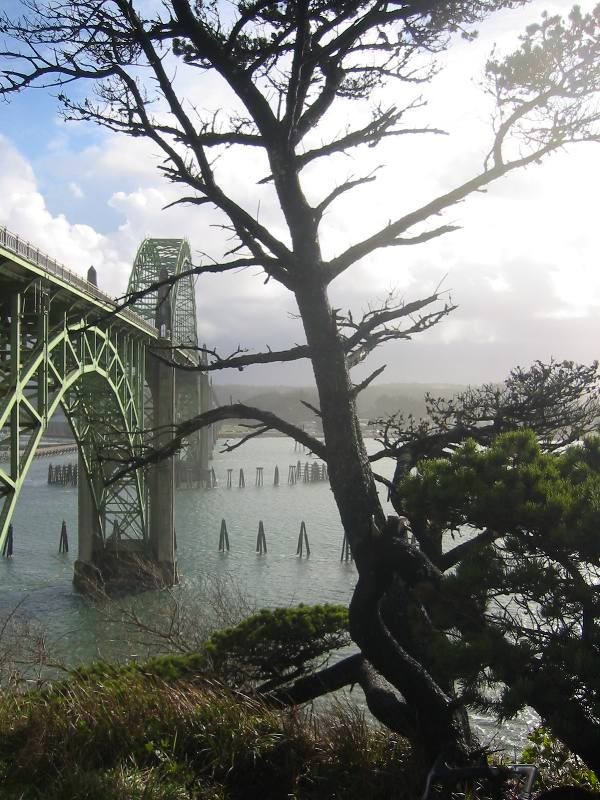
Prior to the 1936 opening of the Yaquina Bay Bridge, steamboats afforded the only transportation across the bay.

As now, the summer was the high tourist season in Newport, and the steamers and small craft on the bay played a major role. It became the custom for everyone in Newport to turn out for the daily landing of the boat from Yaquina City. At the landing, wagons and draymen assembled to transport the passengers to points in the Newport area. For example, in the summer of 1902, the Salem Military Band came to Newport for a few weeks. Pleasure cruises were organized, with the T.M. Richardson carrying the band and pulling crowds of people on two barges. In the evening, the band played for the arrival of the Yaquina boat and also to entertain crowds waiting for the mail at the post office on Front Street. Eventually Newport organized a band of its own, in 1906 or so, which performed similar functions. Eventually Newport was converted to gasoline power, and put to tow duties for the unpowered barges Elk and Julia.

== End of service ==
Until the 1920s, no railroad or highway reached Newport, and steamboats or gasoline launches did the transportation work to the railhead at Yaquina and other points on the bay and the Yaquina River. This changed rapidly as modern roads began to be built in the 1920s. The major coast road, called the “Roosevelt Highway,” was complete to Newport by June 1927. Riverine service to and from Yaquina City did not last much longer after that, ending in 1929, when roads eventually connected Newport and Yaquina, and the boat route was replaced by a bus line.

== List of vessels ==
Inland steam and river boats of Yaquina Bay and Yaquina River
Name	Type	Year built	Where Built	Builders	Owners	Gross Tons	Length	Disposition
Oneatta	sidewheeler	1872	Pioneer					unknown
Rebecca C.								unknown
Cleveland	sidewheeler	1870	Portland		G.W. Simmonds	39	93	unknown
T.M. Richardson	propeller	1888						off-route in 1908, ult. disposition unknown
Augusta	steam tug	1888	Oneatta					bought 1899 by Stetson and Post Mill, transferred to Puget Sound, eventually operated out of Port Angeles under ownership of Michael Earles, sold in 1918 to American Tug Boat Co. of Everett, served there for unknown time.
Roselda	gasoline propeller launch	1895						unknown
Volante		1892	Oneatta					Burned at mooring, Newport, March 7, 1896
Newport	propeller	1908						Off route in 1929, ult. disposition unknown
Beaver	propeller (gasoline)	c. 1908?						unknown

== See also ==
- Steamboats of the Oregon Coast
- Lists of Oregon-related topics
