= Steamboats of the Oregon Coast =

19th century steamboats in Oregon, US

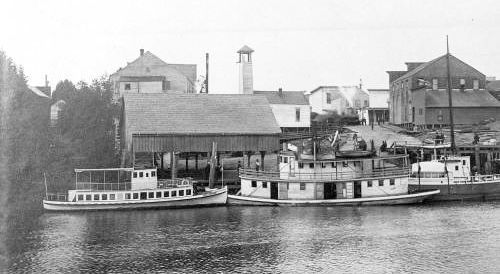
Coquille waterfront, with Wolverine, Favorite and Wilhelmina at dock, about 1908 to 1914

The history of steamboats on the Oregon Coast begins in the late 19th century. Before the development of modern road and rail networks, transportation on the coast of Oregon was largely water-borne. This article focuses on inland steamboats and similar craft operating in, from south to north on the coast: Rogue River, Coquille River, Coos Bay, Umpqua River, Siuslaw Bay, Yaquina Bay, Siletz River, and Tillamook Bay. The boats were all very small, nothing like the big sternwheelers and propeller boats that ran on the Columbia River or Puget Sound. There were many of them, however, and they came to be known as the "mosquito fleet."

== Routes and operations ==
=== Rogue River ===
The Rogue River meets the Pacific Ocean at Gold Beach, and flows all the way from the Cascade Mountains. R. D. Hume was a pioneering businessman at Wedderburn and Gold Beach, then known as Ellensburg. By 1881, he had established a fish cannery and built a steam schooner, Mary D. Hume, to support the cannery operation. Hume was still conducting steamboat operations on the Rogue River in 1901, and in that year, Capt. E.D. Burns built the sternwheel steamboat Rogue River in Portland, and brought her down the coast to compete against Hume's operation. Mary D. Hume passed through several owners and was still in operation as late as 1939, when she was the oldest commercial vessel in service in the Pacific Northwest.

In November 1902, Burns succeeded in reaching deep inland on the Rogue to Agness, however, in returning to Gold Beach, on November 16, 1902, the boat struck a rock at Boiler Rapids, where, at least in 1966, her boiler was reported to be still visible. This was the only known effort to take a conventional vessel so far up the Rogue River.

In 1903 the gasoline-powered Success was built at Gold Beach for the Rogue River service. R.D. Hume continued his interest in shipping out of the Rogue River, commissioning the construction in 1908 of two small gasoline-powered schooners, Enterprise (22 tons) and Osprey (43 tons) from Ellingson in Coquille. Hume died by 1912, as his estate is reported to have sold Enterprise and Osprey to someone from Portland.

=== Coquille River ===
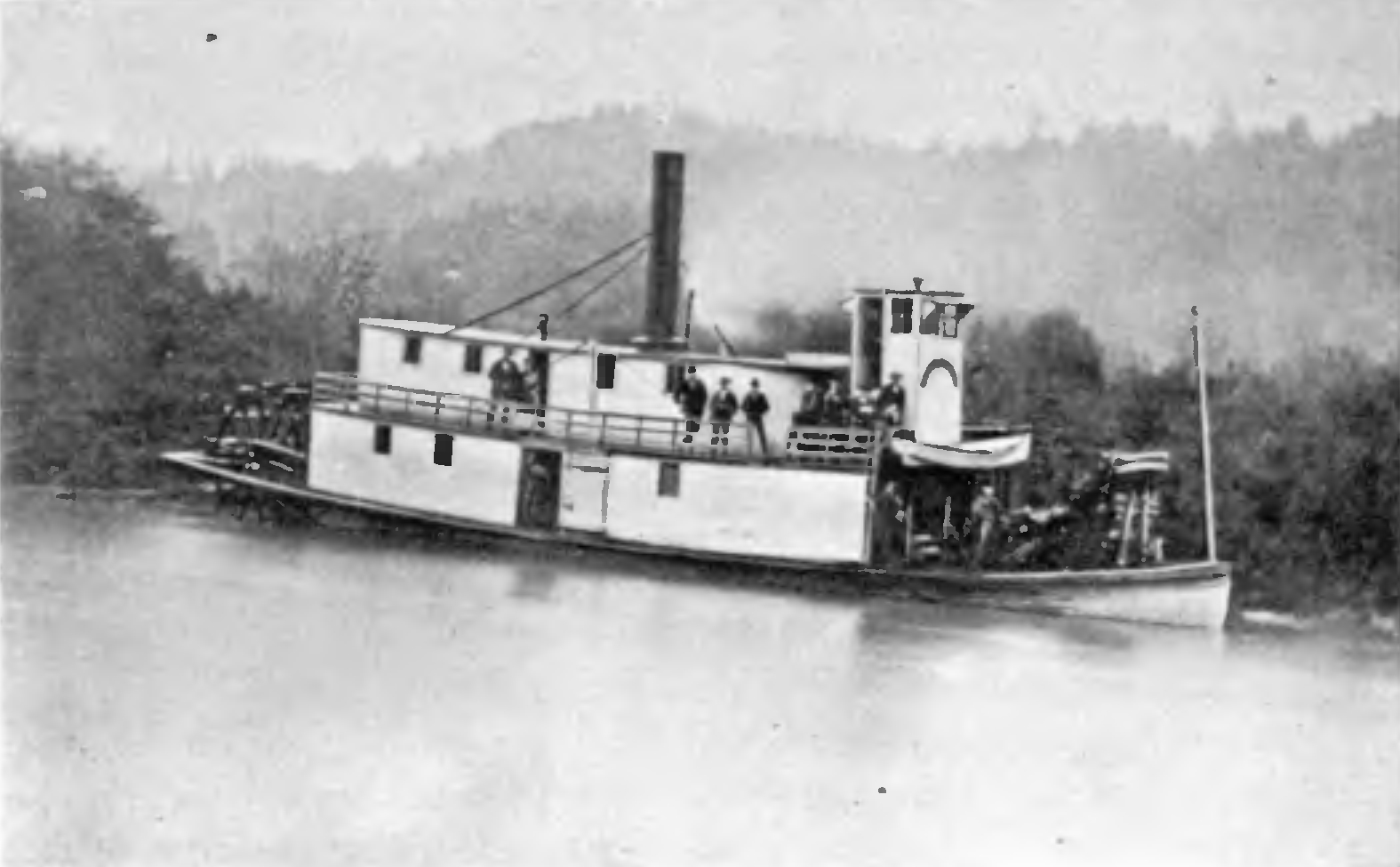
Little Annie on the Coquille River

The Coquille River runs inland from Bandon. Before the era of railroads and later automobiles, the Coquille River was the major transportation route from Bandon to Coquille and Myrtle Point in southern Coos County.

=== Coos Bay ===
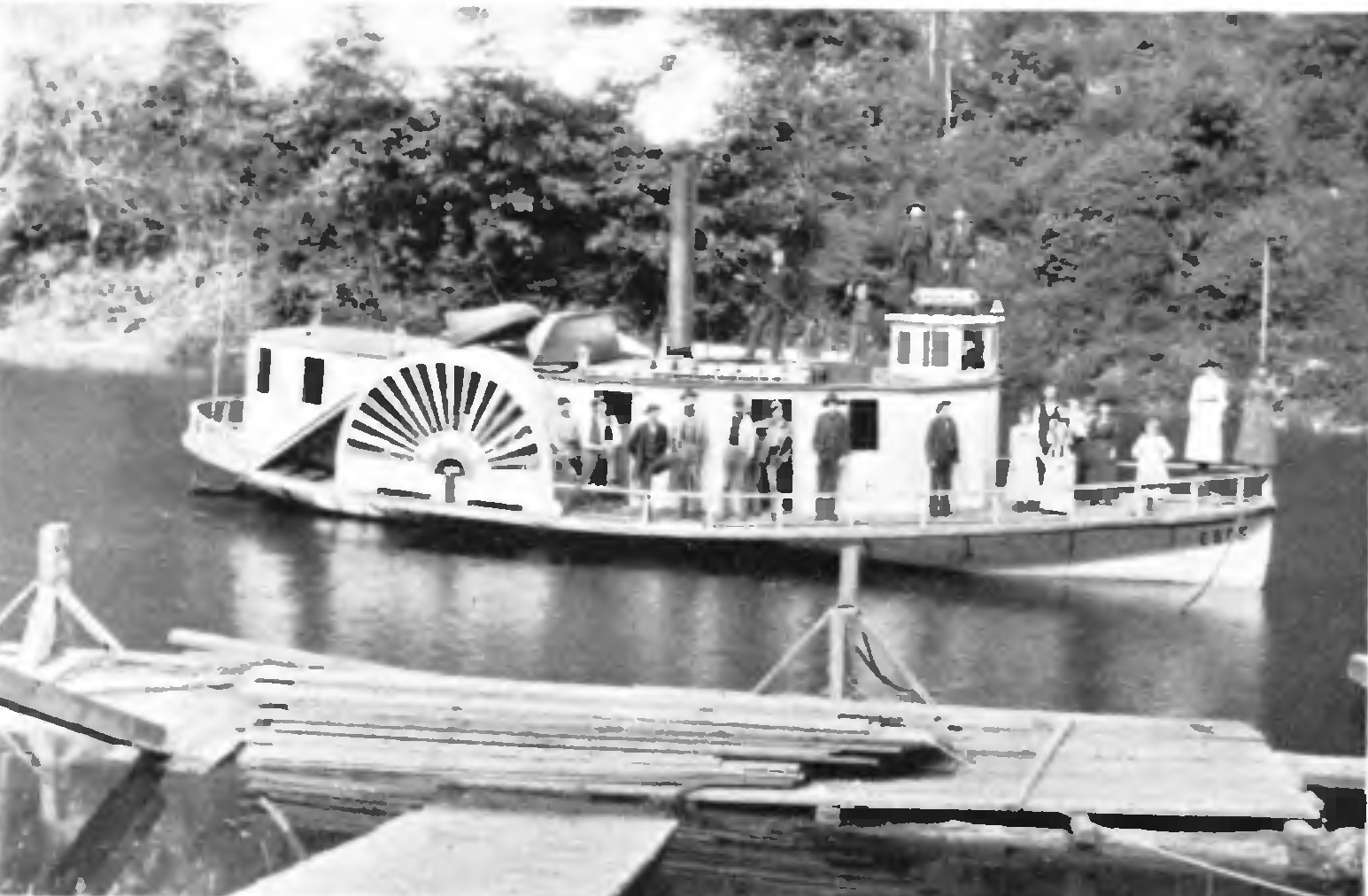
sidewheel steamboat Coos, sometime before 1895

Coos Bay is a large and mostly shallow harbor on Oregon's southwest coast, to the north of the Coquille River valley. It is the major harbor on the west coast of the United States between San Francisco and the mouth of the Columbia River.

Two steamboat captains from the Columbia River began steamboat operations on Coos Bay in 1873. Inland riverboats were used to navigate the bay and the several rivers flow that flow into it. A mule-hauled portage was built between a shallow southern arm of Coos Bay and the Beaver Slough, a shallow north-extending branch of the Coquille River, in 1869; it was replaced in 1874 with a steam portage railroad. This connection established a convenient link between the steamboat operations of Coos Bay and those on the Coquille.

Numerous steamboats were built over the ensuing decades. In 1912, a number of steamboats were wrecked, by collision, fire and grounding on the sandbar at the mouth of the bay.

=== Umpqua River ===
The Umpqua River runs from Reedsport up through Douglas County. Gardiner is a town near the mouth of the Umpqua where several river steamers were built. One of the Umpqua River's several branches eventually reaches Roseburg, although the head of navigation was Scottsburg. Captain Godfrey Seymour began steamboat operations on the Umpqua River with Raftsman, later adding Washington, Swan, and Enterprise.

Swan was unique as the only steamboat to ever ascend as far as Roseburg on the Umpqua. This was in 1870, when the merchants of Gardiner were anxious to demonstrate the navigability of this river. Roseburg is 85 miles above the mouth of the river, and it took Swan 11 days to get there. This was sufficient to persuade Congress to allocate $70,000 for channel clearance of the Umpqua, even though no other steamboat ever again ran up to Roseburg.

In 1906, the propeller steamer Juno (32 tons) was built at Marshfield and placed on the Umpqua River service by the Umpqua River Steam Navigation Company.

- Scottsburg landing on Umpqua River, circa 1900, showing passengers and a number of small vessels

=== Siuslaw Bay and River ===
Siuslaw Bay is yet another large shallow bay on the Oregon coast, with its entrance about 24 miles north of the mouth of the Umpqua River. The Siuslaw River widens into the bay, which meets the ocean near the town of Florence. In 1890 or thereabouts, the Moonlight was placed in service on Siuslaw Bay and its various back channels.

- waterfront of Florence, Oregon, on Suislaw Bay, 1927

=== Yaquina Bay ===
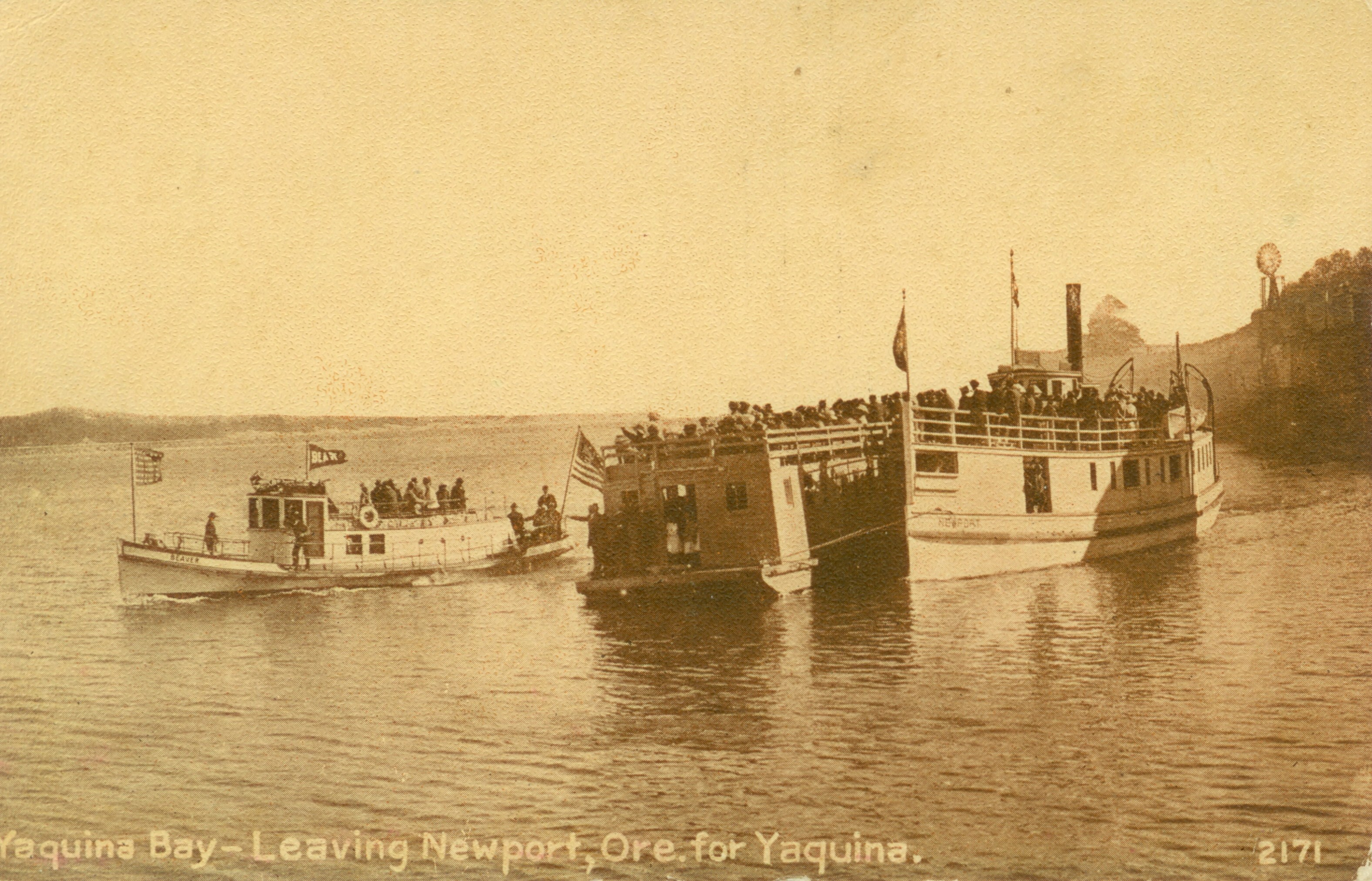
Steamer Newport, with barge lashed on, and launch Beaver departing Newport for Yaquina, circa 1910

Yaquina Bay, like Coos Bay, is another shallow coastal bay on the Oregon Coast. The principal town on Yaquina Bay is Newport. Once the Oregon Pacific Railroad reached Toledo, on the east end of Yaquina Bay, tourists started coming to the bay from the Willamette Valley. The roads were bad or nonexistent at the time, so the only way to the seaside hotels at Newport was to cross the Yaquina Bay by steamer. Propeller steamboats did most of this service, however in 1872, the sidewheeler Oneatta was launched at Pioneer, ran on the bay for a while and then was transferred to the Columbia River, and in 1882, to Humboldt Bay. Later, Rebecca C. and Cleveland also ran on Yaquina Bay.

=== Siletz River ===
The Siletz River runs into the Pacific about 30 miles north of Yaquina Bay, near the town of Taft now part of Lincoln City. The first salmon cannery was established on the Siletz River in 1896 by Daniel Kern, a Portlander. This was Kerns Bros. Packing Co., on the north side of the river. Later that same year the post office of Kernville was established in the same location, where a small town later developed. Kern brought in the small steamer Tonquin, 64' long, built at Portland, to act as a cannery tender and supply vessel. Kern later sold his cannery to Elmore Packing, of Astoria, and went into the marine construction business.

Much later, the Siletz Navigation Company operated on the Siletz, at least in the early 1920s. In 1923, Siletz (93 tons), described as a "strongly built diesel freighter" was launched at Kernville, Oregon, to serve local routes from the Siletz river entrance. This boat was probably more of an ocean-going vessel than the typical mosquito fleet craft, as she was sold to a Hawaii firm and voyaged there herself in 19 days without mishap.

=== Tillamook Bay ===
Bay Ocean, probably off the coast of Oregon

Tillamook Bay was a large very shallow bay on the northern part of the Oregon Coast. In 1911, the yacht Bay Ocean was built in Portland to provide service from Portland to Tillamook Bay for a beach resort. Bay Ocean was designed by R.A. Ballin for the T.B. Potter real estate company, which was developing the (eventually ill-fated) resort at Bay Ocean Spit on Tillamook Bay. Bay Ocean was the largest motor passenger vessel built to that date on the Pacific Coast. She was long (150') and narrow (18' beam), with a clipper bow and bowsprit. She had three gasoline engines connected to a single shaft. She could accommodate 50 passengers on the Portland-Tillamook route but had difficulty on the run and only served in the summer. She was called up by the navy to function as a patrol boat in the First World War. After the war, Bay Ocean was sold to Crowley Launch and Tug Co., of San Francisco.

- cannery tender Susan E. Elmore entering Tillamook Bay
- steamers Harrison and Susan E. Elmore at dock in Tillamook

== Last operations ==
Mosquito fleet operations in the Coos Bay area and Coquille River valley continued up into the 1930s, due to the lack of good roads and other more modern transportation in these areas. As possibly the extreme example, the small (14 tons) gasoline-propeller Welcome, built 1919, was on the run up the Coos River from Marshfield to Allegany until 1948.

== Steamboat graveyards ==
When steamboat service ended on the Coquille, at least three steamers, Myrtle, Telegraph, and Dora were all beached on the river near Bandon.

The Mary D. Hume, built in 1881, is still largely intact, lying on the shore at Gold Beach, Oregon. The wreck itself is on the National Register of Historic Places.

The steam ferry Roosevelt, which used to run on Coos Bay, was photographed abandoned near Marshfield in 1941.

- wreck of Roosevelt, steam ferry, near Marshfield

== List of vessels ==
A large number of boats of all types were built on these waters, powered by various means, including steam, gasoline, and diesel engines. This index will attempt to track only vessels over 30 tons built before 1920, with exceptions where a vessel appears to be of more interest, due to an available on-line image or otherwise.

Inland steamboats on Oregon coastal waterways
Name	Type	Year built	Where Built	Builders	Owners	Gross Tons	Length	Disposition
Swan	sternwheeler	1870	Gardiner		Godfrey Seymour	131		unknown, 1880
Enterprise	sternwheeler	1870	Gardiner		Godfrey Seymour	247		wrecked 1873
Oneatta	sidewheeler	1872	Pioneer			118	82'	transferred to Columbia River, circa 1874, then to California 1882
Messenger	sternwheeler	1872	Empire City	Capt. M. Lane		136	91'	burned 1876 at Coos Bay, total loss
Little Annie	sternwheeler	1877	Coquille	William E. Rackliffe		86	70'	hit snag and sank near Bandon, 1890
Mud Hen	sternwheeler	1878	Coquille River				32'	unknown, 1892
Mary D. Hume	propeller cannery tender	1881	Ellensburg	R.D. Hume	R.D. Hume	158	98.1'	sold in the late 1880s to Alaska whaling interests, later a cannery tender in Alaskan waters, reengined several times, and in service as late as 1939. Currently lying on shore at Gold Beach
Dispatch (I)	sternwheeler	1890	Bandon			24	52'	unknown, probably abandoned 1904
Alert	sternwheeler	1890	Bandon	Hans Reed		96	69'	Transferred to San Francisco in 1919, foundered Sept. 26, 1919, near Rio Vista.
Eva	sternwheeler	1894	Portland		Umpqua Steam Nav. Co.; W.F. Jewett	130	90'	unknown, 1918 (probably abandoned)
Favorite	propeller	1900	Coquille	Arthur Ellingson		13	72'	unknown, 1917
Pastime	sternwheeler (gasoline)	1900	Coquille			11	45'	unknown, 1901
Rogue River	sternwheeler	1901	Portland		E.B. Burns	66	80'	wrecked, Boiler Rapids on Rogue River, 16 November 1902
Welcome	sternwheeler	1900	Coquille	S.H. Adams		30	56'	wrecked, 1907
Echo	sternwheeler	1901	Coquille	Ellingson		76	66'	unknown, probably abandoned 1911
Dispatch (II)	sternwheeler	1903	Parkersburg	Charles Tweed		250	111'	rebuilt 1922 as towboat John Wildi
Liberty	sternwheeler	1903	Bandon	Herman Bros.		174	91'	unknown, 1918
Success	sternwheeler (gasoline)	1903	Gold Beach			14		unknown
Juno	propeller	1906	Marshfield			32	60.8'	unknown
Millicoma	sternwheeler	1909	Marshfield	Frank Lowe		14	55'	later converted to gasoline engine, rebuilt 1917 as propeller, ult. dispo unk.
Newport	propeller	1908	Yaquina			81	72'	converted to gasoline power, ran until the mid-1920s, ultimate disposition unknown
Charm	propeller (gasoline)	1908	Prosper	Herman Bros.			75'	Badly damaged by collision with Telegraph 1914, and forced to beach near Bandon. Repaired and ran on Coquille River until sale to Shaver Transportation Co. in 1928.
Pedler	sternwheeler	1908	Marshfield	S. Gilroy		407	124'	unknown, 1910
Coquille	propeller	1908	Coquille	Frank Lowe		407	124'	transferred to Columbia R., date and ultimate dispo. unk.
Myrtle (I)	sternwheeler	1909	Myrtle Point	Nels Nelson	Myrtle Point Trans. Co.	36	57'	rebuilt as freighter 1922.
Sunset	sternwheeler	1909	Prosper	Carl Herman	Fredrick Elmore Drane Line	12	40'	Registry # 206414 sank November 2, 1924 at 6:30 a.m. on the Coquille River at Bandon, Oregon resulting in the drowning death of Clarence Henry Hurley (06/22/1880 - 11/02/1924), president of the C. & C. Cedar Company of Bandon, Oregon. Salvaged and remained in service until abandoned June 30, 1929.
Dora	sternwheeler	1910	Randolph	Herman Bros.	W.R. Panter	47	64'	abandoned 1927
Bayocean	propeller yacht (gasoline)	1911	Portland	Joseph Supple	T.B. Potter Realty Co.	130	150'	taken into naval service during First World War on April 27, 1918, decommissioned March 14, 1919, sold to L. Parker, of Oakland, CA
Fay No. 4	sternwheeler (gasoline)	1912	North Bend			179	136'	Transferred to California, 1913
Lifeline	propeller (gasoline)	1912	Marshfield			179	136'	Foundered off coast June 5, 1923, just south of Neahkanie Mountain, while en route from Coos Bay to Kelso. Crew survived, hull washed ashore and buried by sand.
Rainbow	sternwheeler	1912	Marshfield	Frank Lowe	Coos River Trans. Co.	75	64'	Abandoned 1923
Telegraph	sternwheeler	1914	Prosper	Carl Herman	Myrtle Point Trans. Co.	96	103'	rebuilt and lengthened to 115' in about 1916, abandoned by 1940
Relief	sternwheeler	1916	Coquille	Ellingson		44	64'	unknown, 1927
Myrtle (II)	sternwheeler	1922	Prosper			36	60'	abandoned by 1940
John Wildi (ex-Dispatch)	sternwheeler	1922	Parkersburg			173	112'	abandoned 1927
Siletz	diesel freighter	1923	Kernville			93	64'	transferred to Hawaii, renamed Moi, and operated there by Young Bros.

== See also ==
- Columbia River Maritime Museum
- Historic ferries in Oregon
- Steamboats of the Columbia River
- Lists of Oregon-related topics

== Notes and references ==
=== General references ===
- Newell, Gordon R., ed. H.W. McCurdy Marine History of the Pacific Northwest, Superior Publishing, Seattle, WA 1966
