= Yaquina, Oregon =

Unincorporated community in the state of Oregon, United States

- Unincorporated community
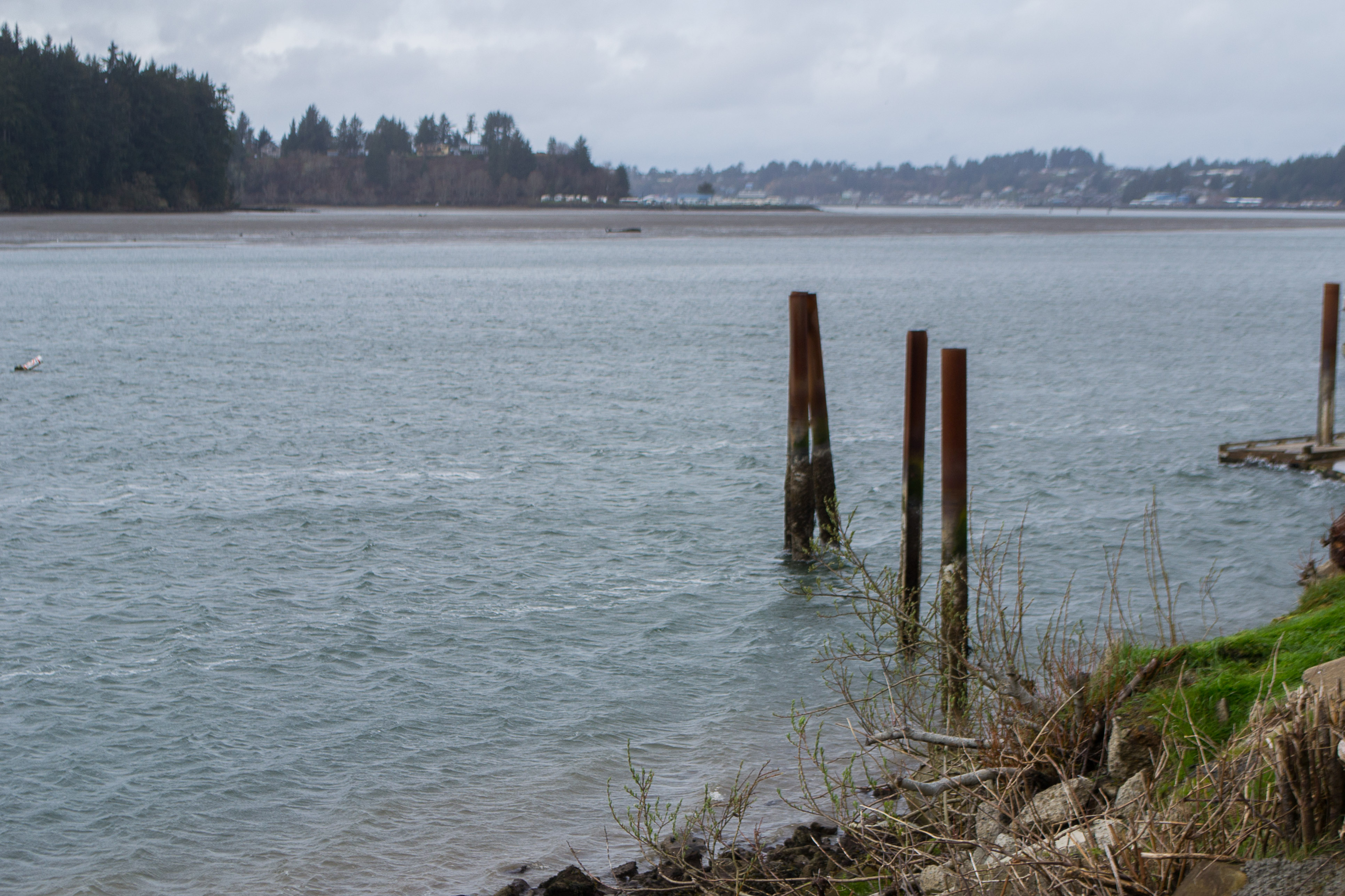
- The former site of Yaquina City

- Location within Oregon Location within the United States
- Coordinates: 44°36′07″N 124°00′31″W
- Country: United States
- State: Oregon
- County: Lincoln
- Named for: Yaquina people
- Elevation: 36 ft (11 m)
- Time zone: UTC-8 (PST)
  - Summer (DST): UTC-7 (PDT)
- GNIS feature ID: 1152697

Yaquina (/jəˈkwɪnə/ yə-KWIN-ə), at one time a thriving port called Yaquina City, is an unincorporated community in Lincoln County, in the U.S. state of Oregon. It is near the mouth of the Yaquina River, on the east side of Yaquina Bay, and is a 3-to-4-mile (5 to 6 km) drive from Newport. The Oregon Press Association, which became the Oregon Newspaper Publishers Association, was founded in Yaquina City in 1887.

== Name ==
The city, the bay, and the river are all named for the Yaquina people, a small Native American tribe of Yakonan speakers who lived near the bay.

== History ==
Historical population
Census	Pop.	Note	%±
1900	268		—
1910	289		7.8%
1920	310		7.3%
1930	88		−71.6%

In the late 19th century, Yaquina City was the western terminus of the Oregon Pacific Railroad, linking the harbor there to Corvallis and Albany. Thomas Egenton Hogg, the rail line's chief promoter, and his Eastern financial backers believed that a steamship–railroad combination using Yaquina Bay could compete successfully with the usual Columbia River route to Portland. The first train moved over the line in 1885, making connections at Yaquina City with a steamer to San Francisco. However, the Yaquina–Albany line and a partly completed extension from Albany toward the Cascade Range, became too expensive to continue. After the Oregon Pacific failed financially, it fell into receivership and went through 17 years of financial and legal complications before becoming a branch line of the Southern Pacific in 1907.

In 1911, the city had a railroad station, a roundhouse and associated railroad shops, a bank, a three-story hotel, other commercial establishments, and many homes. As many as eight trains were needed on weekends to carry beach-goers from the Willamette Valley to Yaquina City and the steamer Yaquina, which carried them across the bay to Newport. However, Newport and nearby Toledo, more accessible by highway, grew larger over time while Yaquina City shrank. By the beginning World War II, Toledo was the western terminus of the rail line, and the tracks from there to Yaquina City were removed. Roughly 20 years later, the former seaport's population dropped to zero. Historian Edwin Culp writes: "Today one can drive along the bay from Newport to Toledo, pass through Yaquina City, and never know that such a town existed."
