= Bushrod Washington Wilson =

Bushrod Washington "Bush" Wilson (1824–1900) was a pioneer, business leader, and local politician in the American state of Oregon. He is best remembered as one of the pioneering first citizens of the town of Corvallis, Oregon, and as the founder of the Willamette Valley & Coast Railroad (WV&C), established in 1874.

== Biography ==
=== Early years ===
Bushrod Washington Wilson was born July 18, 1824, at Columbia Falls, Maine, into a family which on his paternal side dated its American roots back to the immigration of Gowan Wilson from Scotland in 1657. His mother was a member of the Pineo family, which dated its North American roots back to French Huguenots who emigrated to Nova Scotia in 1617.

When Wilson was 10 his father moved to New York City to work as a millwright. Bush went to school until he was 12, at which time he left to go to work at an early age, taking a job as an office boy for Cornelius Vanderbilt and making the acquaintance of young newspaper publisher Horace Greeley. The family would move again in 1838, this time to Illinois.

Wilson's father remarried in 1840, and Bush did not get along with his new stepmother, causing him to leave home to make his own way in the world. He worked his way across the country from St. Charles, Illinois, to New York City, returning to the city of his boyhood.

In October 1843, at the age of 19, Wilson joined the crew of a whaling ship out of New Bedford, Massachusetts, spending the next two and a half years at sea. The journey took him to the Society Islands in the South Pacific Ocean where he would remain for six months, followed by a season on the Northwest coast, where the ship on which he served would take 12,000 barrels of oil. From there he travelled to the Hawaiian Islands spending a season on the equator before returning again to the Northwest.

After the end of his voyage he returned to New York City for a time, until the California Gold Rush of 1849, which motivated him to sail around the horn of South America to California to try his hand at mining. He arrived in San Francisco in July 1850 and spent just two weeks in the city before heading out to try his hand mining on the Yuba and American Rivers — losing money and falling ill in the process.

Discouraged by the situation in California, Wilson sought to pursue greener pastures to the north, having heard promising things about mining opportunities upon the Umpqua River of the Oregon Territory. On October 15, 1850, he boarded the schooner Reindeer as a passenger and set out for the new opportunity.

=== Move to Oregon ===
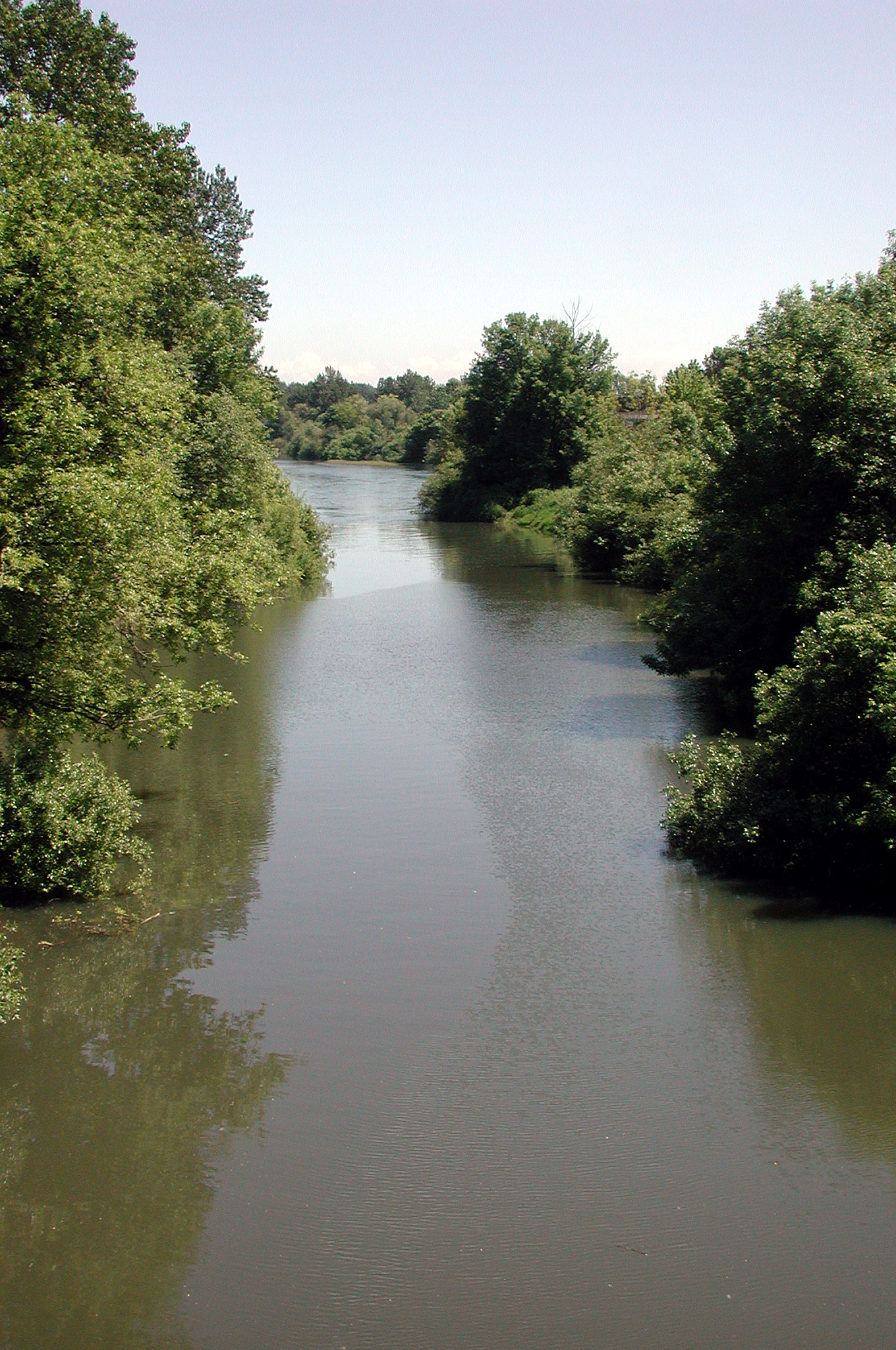
Junction of the Marys and Willamette Rivers, today within the boundaries of Corvallis, Oregon

After adverse weather which made the journey slow and treacherous, the Reindeer arrived at the mouth of the Umpqua, located near the southern boundary of the Oregon territory, on November 8, 1850. Wilson and his compatriots arrived to a virtually deserted place, and considered themselves "fooled as to the diggings on the Umpqua." Wilson and four would be miners purchased a canoe from local Native American people and began to head up the river.

Together with a companion Wilson made his way by foot over the Coast Mountain Range to the Willamette Valley, eventually arriving at the junction of the Willamette and Marys rivers — the site of the present city of Corvallis, then a settlement called "Marysville." There Wilson and his associate joined founding settlers Joseph C. Avery, James F. Dixon, and a small handful of others who had established homesteads under the Donation Land Claim Act.

Wilson first worked as a carpenter, taking a land claim and building his own cabin, working for wages from others in his spare time. Wilson had no aspirations at farming, instead spending the 1851 agricultural year building a 20 by 30-foot house, one full story and a loft in height. Wilson was extremely enthusiastic about his new home, anticipating that Marysville would eventually be "one of the largest places in Oregon" and a "center of travel to and from California" as a commercial center on the banks of the north-and-south running Willamette River. Construction was booming and Wilson was able to clear a handsome $3 a day working as a carpenter, with all the construction work that could be handled.

In 1855 Wilson married former Missouri resident turned Oregon pioneer Priscilla Owsley Yantis. The couple would ultimately raise 13 children, 9 of whom survived their childhood years to adulthood.

He also spent time improving his homestead claim, clearing and cultivating a parcel of land, which he ultimately sold for $3,500. He speculated on town land parcels ultimately owning 20 lots valued at from $50 to $300 each.

In 1858 Wilson liquidated many of his assets and used the money to purchase a steam-powered sawmill and planing mill located in Peoria, Oregon, located about 7 miles east of Corvallis. The facility was capable of turning out 12,000 board feet of lumber per day, material which allowed Wilson to clear an average of $7 per day. Martin stayed in the lumber business for just one year, ultimately selling the mill in 1859, carrying the loan and charging 20% interest.

In search of a new occupation, Wilson decided to once again try his hand at placer mining, purchasing and operating gold mining claims on the Owyhee River in southern Idaho. This time he managed to do "better than the majority and came out about even." Wilson also constructed and operated the first ferry across the Snake River, near the site of today's Lewiston. He plied this trade for a short time before returning to Corvallis in 1861, where he also ran a ferry across the Willamette for about a year.

=== Political career ===
Wilson's earliest political allegiance was to the Whig Party. He had free-soil proclivities and supported the abolition of slavery. Following the demise of the Whig Party and establishment of the Republican Party, he became a member of that organization.

In 1862 he was hired as deputy county clerk for Benton County. At the next election he successfully ran for county clerk, winning an office that he would ultimately hold for 15 consecutive terms — a period of thirty years.

Wilson was a prominent member of the Republican Party of Oregon and was frequently urged by his political friends to run for Governor of Oregon or United States Congress — requests which were invariably turned aside. In an 1875 letter to his brother Joseph, Bushrod Wilson noted the pecuniary rationale for his aversion to candidacy in state-level politics, writing:

I have been offered, time and again, high positions in the state but I positively refused. They don't give state officials enough to live in the style that would be required...

It has additionally been noted by one biographer of Wilson that the monetary aspect of public service may have had a decisive impact on Wilson's decision not to run for re-election as county clerk in 1894, since that year marked a change of the system of pay of the position from a fee-based schedule to salary. Whereas in 1894, Wilson realized an annual salary of about $2,400 under the old system, his 1895 salary would have totaled just $1,500 per year — likely helping to spur the decision to retire from the position.

Wilson was active in community affairs and was a thirty-second degree Mason. He was also one of the founders of the Corvallis Library Association in December 1872. He was also elected chair of the Benton County Board of Immigration in May 1885.

=== Business career ===
In July 1874 Wilson organized the Willamette Valley & Coast Railroad Company (WV&C), which aimed to construct an east-west railway from Yaquina Bay at today's Newport, Oregon, all the way across Oregon, ultimately connecting with a track being laid by the Chicago & Northwestern as part of a potentially lucrative transcontinental railway project. The scheme would allow for the transport of grain from the Willamette Valley to the coast, where it could be transported by ship to various locations around the world.

After paying for the initial surveys out of pocket, Wilson obtained financial commitments from other local investors, who became stockholders in his railway firm. He served as president of the corporation for one year, followed by six years as secretary after the fledgling company was absorbed by the Oregon Pacific Railroad.

Wilson was involved in a business subsidiary of the Oregon Pacific, the Oregon Development Company. The company established regular steam vessel service between Yaquina Bay and San Francisco Bay and ran boats from Portland to Corvallis on the Willamette in an effort to develop region trade, making the area more lucrative for the Oregon Pacific's rail lines.

He was also an investor in the Oregon & California Railroad, running a line from San Francisco to Portland and was influential in gaining federal money for the development of the Yaquina Bay harbor.

In 1885, Wilson and two other investors established the Gazette Publishing Company, which purchased the local Republican daily, the Corvallis Gazette, from its previous publisher, M. S. Woodcock. This holding company published the paper for only one year before selling the paper to Frank Conover.

=== Death and legacy ===
Bushrod Wilson died at Corvallis, Oregon on March 4, 1900. He was 76 years old. He died with no property, having sold his lots in Corvallis and other assets by 1883 to cover the cost of his railroad investments.

At the time of his death, Wilson had held the position of county clerk for a longer period of time than any other person in the history of Oregon.

== See also ==
- Willamette Valley and Coast Railroad Depot
- Bushrod Washington
