= Klamath (steamboat) =

Historic steamboat in United States

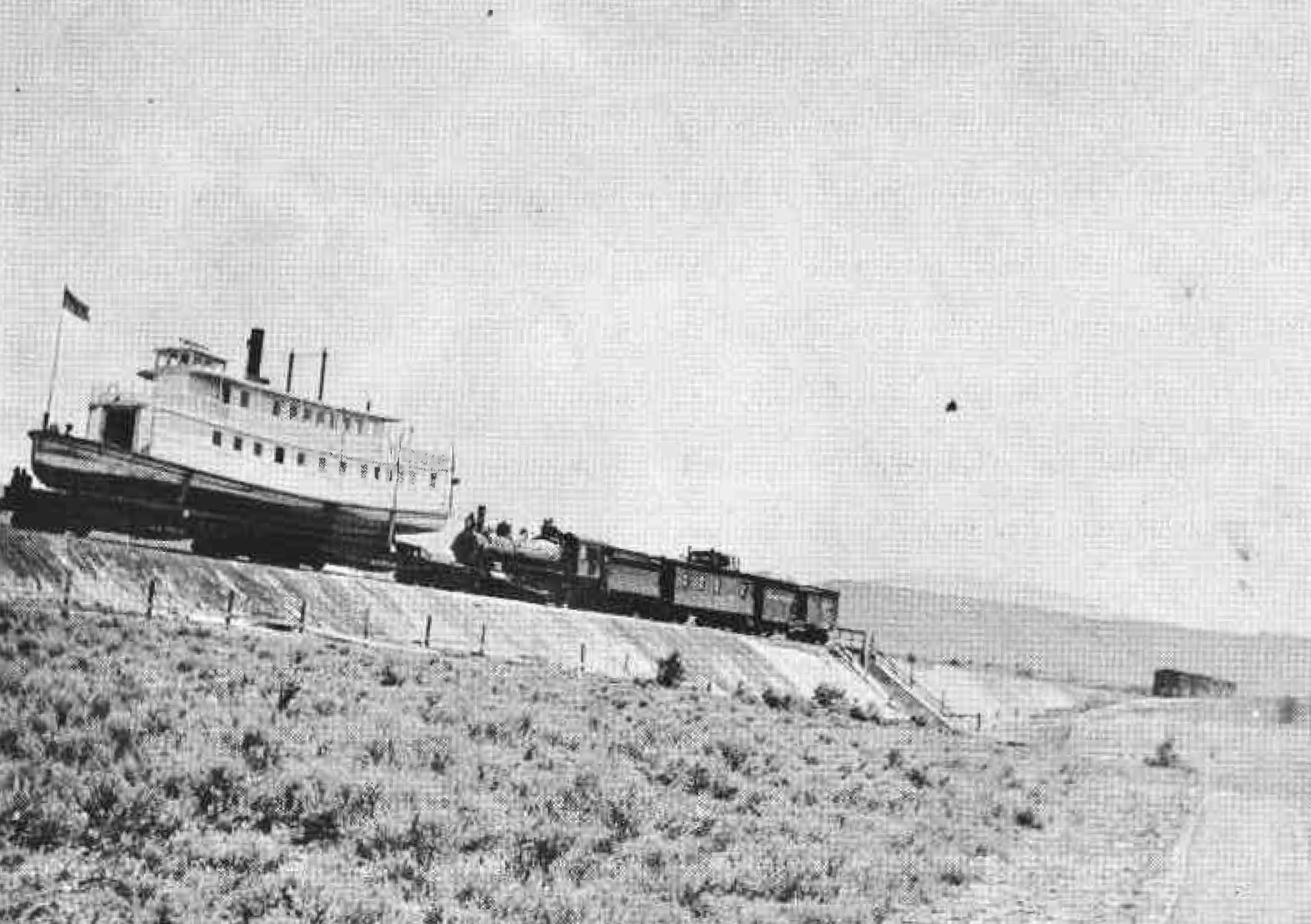
- Steamer Klamath hauled overland by rail from Lower to Upper Klamath Lake, 1910

History
- Name: Klamath
- Owner: Klamath County Navigation Co.; Oregon & California Transportation Co.; Pelican Bay Lumber Co.
- Route: Lower Klamath Lake (1905-1909); Upper Klamath Lake (after 1909)
- Cost: $10,000 approximately
- Launched: July 29, 1905
- Completed: 1905
- Maiden voyage: July 30, 1905 (trial trip)
- Identification: U.S. 202570
- Fate: Abandoned at Pelican Bay, Upper Klamath Lake
- Notes: Abandoned hulk of steamer visible until late 1950s

General characteristics
- Class & type: Inland shallow draft passenger/freighter
- Tonnage: 69 gross tons
- Length: 75 ft (22.9 m)
- Beam: 15.2 ft 9 in (4.9 m) over hull (exclusive of guards
- Draft: 2 ft 0 in (0.61 m)
- Depth: 4.4 ft 0 in (1.34 m)
- Decks: Two (freight and passenger)
- Installed power: Compound steam engine, double expansion, water tube boiler
- Propulsion: Propeller, 42 in (1,066.8 mm) in diameter
- Speed: About 15 miles per hour (13 kn) maximum
- Capacity: 75 to 100 passengers on a regular basis; four staterooms on upper deck
- Crew: Two officially required
- Notes: Tunnel stern design adopted for operation in shallow water; vessel was assembled from components pre-built in Portland, Oregon

Klamath was the first and only vessel larger than a launch to operate on Lower Klamath Lake, which straddled the border between the U.S. states of Oregon and California. This vessel is chiefly known for having been hauled overland by rail from Lake Ewauna to Upper Klamath Lake. It was also one of only two licensed merchant vessels ever to operate on lower Klamath Lake. During 1905 to 1909, Klamath was an essential link in a transportation line to Klamath Falls which involved rail, stage coach, and steamer travel. The late arrival of railroads to the Klamath lakes region made riverine and lake transport more important to the area.

== Design ==
Although launched in Klamath Falls, Klamath was built in Portland, Oregon. In late 1904, officials of the Klamath Lakes Navigation Company, Capt. George Woodbury and Woodbury’s father-in-law, "Colonel" M.G. (Mathew Greenberry) Wilkins (1844-1921), a Civil War veteran on the Confederate side, hired a noted ship architect from Portland, J.H. Johnson to design a shallow draft propeller-driven steamboat to operate in the Klamath Lakes region. This boat was to be the Klamath.

At that time, the only licensed merchant vessel operating on lower Klamath Lake was the Canby, a small (67-foot long, 48 gross tons) propeller-driven steamboat built in 1904 at Keno, Oregon.

The Klamath's hull would have an unusual design. The stern was built with a curved recess to allow the propeller to turn without projecting deeper into the water than the keel of the vessel. This was called a "tunnel stern". The purpose was to allow the steamer to operate in shallow water without damaging the propeller should the boat be grounded or strike an obstacle. This appears to have been the first time this design feature was used on a vessel on waters in the Pacific Northwest.

In operation, the tunnel stern did not always provide sufficient protection for the propeller. On Saturday evening, November 10, 1906, when Klamath was returning to Klamath Falls from Laird’s Landing, the steamer struck a sunken log and every blade was broken off the propeller.

When word of the accident reached the company’s office in Klamath Falls, they dispatched the gasoline launch Ewauna to tow the steamer back to the city. Not long before, a similar accident had broken off two propeller blades, and the company had replaced it with its only spare. No new spare propeller had been ordered, and so the steamer would have to be laid up for about ten days to await delivery of a new propeller.

== Construction ==
Work on the steamer began in Portland on March 20, 1905, with the sawing and forming of the 45 frames of the boat’s hull. The frames were made of 2.5 inches (64 mm) thick Douglas fir planks.

Once the steamer had been assembled, preliminarily, in Portland, it was then "knocked down" (taken apart) and shipped to Klamath Falls, by way of rail to Pokegama, Oregon, where the rail line ended, west of Keno, Oregon.

At Pokegama the components were loaded onto freight wagons, and hauled overland to Keno, Oregon. Keno was on the Klamath River, downstream from Lake Ewauna. Once at Keno, the steamer’s components were taken by water transport upriver to Lake Ewauna, on which the city of Klamath Falls was located, and where the boat would be assembled.

The assembly of the steamer, which was supervised by John G. Sound, an experienced shipbuilder from Portland, was well underway at Klamath Falls by June 8, 1905. The boiler had been installed into the boat by then.

== Launch and trial trip ==
Launch of Klamath, July 29, 1905

Klamath was launched at 9:07:30 a.m. on Saturday, July 29, 1905, into Lake Ewauna. There was no formal ceremony. However, 300 people turned out to watch the launch from the wharves and the nearby bridge, with about 20 boats in the water as well. This was about the entire population of Klamath Falls at the time.

The steamer was launched stern first from the boat docks, which were near the bridge on Lake Ewauna. After the launch, the boat was hauled over to a wharf for the finishing work to be completed.

On Sunday, July 30, 1905, Captain Woodbury and Colonel Wilkins took the steamer out on a trial trip, making a run to Ady, Oregon.

== Owners of the steamer ==
The boat was built for the Klamath County Navigation Company, which was also known as the Pioneer Line. The company had been incorporated in July, 1903, by filing articles of incorporation with the Oregon Secretary of State in Salem, Oregon.

The capital stock of the company was stated to be $10,000. The incorporators were Sherman V. Short (1856-1915), George H. Woodbury (1861-1945), and E.E. Upmeyer.

Woodbury was an experienced steamboat man, having worked for eight years prior to the founding of the company as the purser on the well-known Columbia river steamer T.J. Potter. Short, who came from a steamboating family, was also an experienced steamboat man, who had worked as a captain for the Oregon Steam Navigation Company, and then for the Oregon Pacific Railroad, on their steamers N.S. Bentley, Wm. M. Hoag and Three Sisters. E.E. Upmeyer (d.1912) was a prominent businessman of Linn County, Oregon, who had been in the state legislature during the 1907 session. Short and Woodbury had been captain and purser, respectively, of the Columbia river steamer Dalles City.

M.G. Wilkins, Woodberry’s father-in-law, also had an interest in the company.

The company was preparing to use gasoline launches on the Klamath Lakes. By January 1, 1904, the company had placed two launches in service.

== Specifications ==
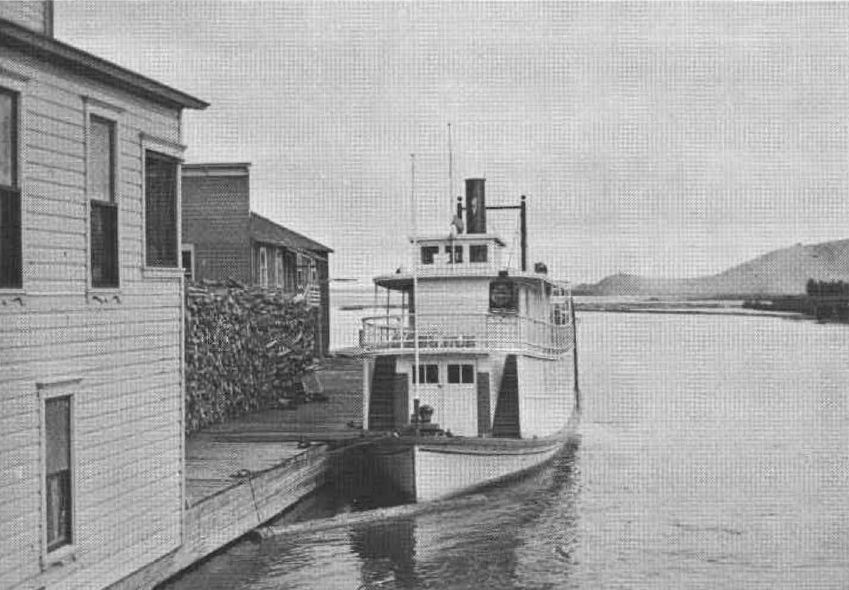
Klamath at dock at Klamath Falls, circa 1907. Note stacked cordwood for fuel on the dock, and protective log boom in water in front of vessel.

According to one report, Klamath was 80 feet (24 m) long, with a beam (width) of 15 feet (4.6 m), and a draft (the minimum depth of water necessary to float the boat) of 2 2.5 feet. or 3 feet 2 inches, depending on the source consulted. The official dimensions, as recorded in the U.S. merchant vessel registry, were length 75 feet (23 m), beam 15.2 feet (4.6 m), and depth of hold 4 feet (1.2 m). Overall size was 69 gross and 61 registered tons, which were a measure of volume, not weight.

Klamath was driven by a steam engine which generated 150 horsepower, turning a single propeller 42 (or 44) inches in diameter. Upon launching, it was reported that the steamer would probably be able to reach a speed of 15 miles per hour (24 km/h). The engine was a compound double expansion condensing type, with a high-pressure cylinder of 8-inch diameter and a low-pressure cylinder with a 16-inch diameter, with both cylinders having a 9-inch stroke. The engine was designed by the same ship architect J.H. Johnston who had designed the boat. The engine, which was built at the Hicks Machine Shop in Portland, Oregon, was the most up-to-date design of the time.

The boiler was an Almy type water tube boiler, built by the Almy Water Tube Boiler Company, of Providence, Rhode Island. It could be fired by either wood or coal. The boiler was shipped from Providence on March 31, 1905, to Montague, California by rail, and then hauled overland by a wagon and team to Klamath Falls.

The steamer had two decks, freight and passenger, a dining room and four staterooms. It was expected, upon launching, that Klamath would be licensed to carry 75 to 100 passengers on regular trips. Freight capacity was 75 tons, in this usage a measure of weight rather than volume.

The official merchant vessel registry number was 202570. The officially required number of crew was two. The official homeport (the place where the vessel's licensing documentation was kept) was Coos Bay, Oregon.

== Operations on lower Klamath Lake ==
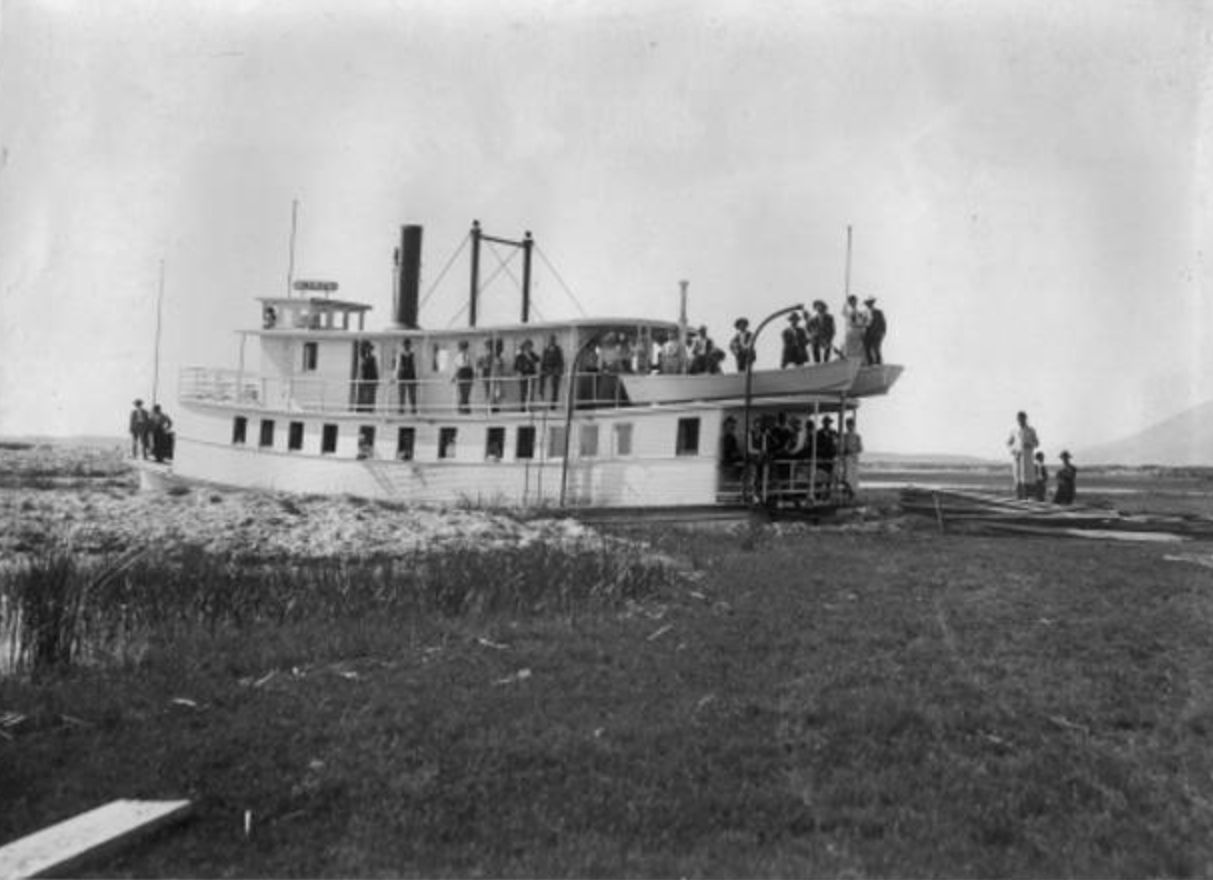
Klamath at Merrill Landing, on lower Klamath Lake, July 1906

In 1903, no railroad ran to Klamath Falls, Oregon, the principle settlement in the region. Klamath was intended to serve as a link in a transportation line as follows: steamer Klamath from Klamath Falls to Lairds Landing (50 miles (80 km)), stage coach to Bartles, California on the McCloud River Railroad (45 miles (72 km)); thereafter by rail to the junction with the Southern Pacific Railroad at Upton, California (53 miles (85 km)). The whole trip took a day and a half. Arrangements for the stage line were still being made in late August 1905, when Klamath was licensed to enter commercial service.

After the launch on July 29, 1905, Klamath was expected to start its regular run, about 50 miles (80 km) each way, between Klamath Falls and Laird’s Landing, California about August 10 or 15.

However, Klamath did not receive its official clearance until August 23, 1905, when the steamer was inspected by U.S. steamboat inspectors E.S. Edwards and George F. Fuller, of Portland, who passed the steamer and issued it a registration certificate. The Klamath Lake Navigation Company also owned two barges which it used with Klamath. These barges measured 20 feet (6.1 m) wide and 62 feet (19 m) long, and were built at the same time as Klamath.

Klamath was expected to be able to make the 50-mile (80 km) run between Klamath Falls and Laird’s Landing in about three hours.

Counting the costs of building the new steamer, the Klamath Lake Navigation Company had spent about $25,000 in capital improvements, including a dock at Klamath Falls measuring 60 by 225 feet (18 by 69 m) and a 60-by-80-foot (18 by 24 m) warehouse.

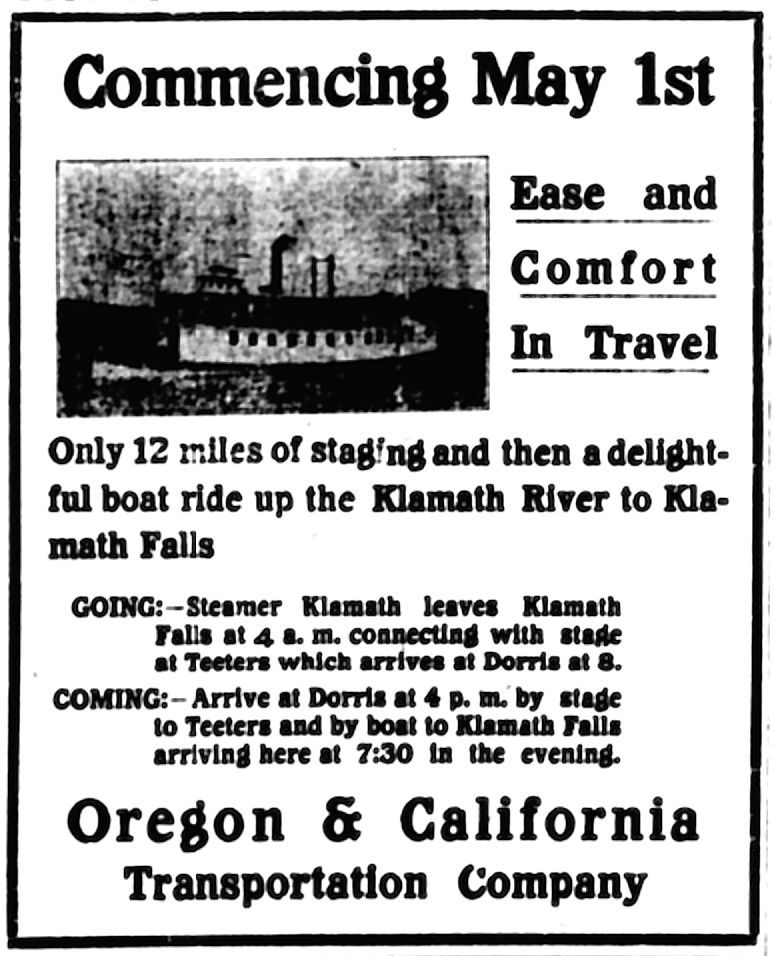
Advertisement for steamer Klamath, May 1908

The stage line from Bartles to Laird's Landing began operations in October, 1905.

By November 1, 1905, Klamath was making three trips a week between Klamath Falls and Laird’s Landing. No commercial vessel could reach Laird’s Landing in the natural state of the lake which was in large part a shallow marsh. Instead a channel had to be dredged from the central part where the water was somewhat deeper, and this was done specifically so that Klamath could reach Laird’s landing. The channel ran about 2 miles (3.2 km) from Laird’s Landing in a northeasterly direction.

In October 1906, Klamath broke its propeller while backing into a submerged ledge of rock about 3 miles (4.8 km) from Klamath Falls. No drydock existed in Klamath Falls to facilitate the repair. Instead, tons of cement were piled on the boat of the steamer, forcing the bow into the water and raising the stern into the air. A raft was then pushed under the stern, which served as a platform for workmen to replace the broken propeller.

=== Notable passengers ===
On the evening of Thursday, November 2, 1905, a committee of the Klamath Falls Chamber of Commerce met Oregon’s Governor George Earle Chamberlain at Keno, on board Klamath. The occasion for the governor’s visit was the signing of the contract with the government to commence the building of the Klamath Project. Two hundred and fifty people crowded the dock to greet the governor’s arrival on the steamer. Steam whistles sounded and a band played a welcoming tune. Flags and bunting decorated the city.

In August 1907, E.H. Harriman, the extremely wealthy railroad man, visited the Klamath lakes region. Stage line routes changed frequently at that time, and rather than proceed to Laird’s Landing from the California Northeastern rail terminus, Harriman and his party met the steamer at Teeter’s Landing (about 4.5 miles (7.2 km) south of Keno) and proceeded from there on Klamath into Klamath Falls. Harriman, then an older man, was worn out by the stage ride, but he was reported to have been revived somewhat by the ride on the then-modern steamer, asking questions of Col. Wilkins as to how it was brought to the lake, the demand for its services, and other inquiries about its operation.

=== Ice problems ===
Klamath had problems with ice on the lower lake. On November 24, 1906, ice knocked a hole in the side of the steamer. On December 20, 1906, Klamath was forced to suspend operations for the winter because of the amount of ice on the lake.

=== Route change ===
Starting on May 1, 1908, Klamath was new route that was advertised as offering "ease and comforted In travel", with "only 12 miles of staging and then a delightful boat ride up the Klamath River to Klamath Falls." Travellers departing Klamath Falls would leave on the steamer Klamath at 4:00 a.m. for Teeter's Landing, from whence they would proceed by stage coach to the rail line at Dorris, California.

=== Heavy traffic in 1908 ===
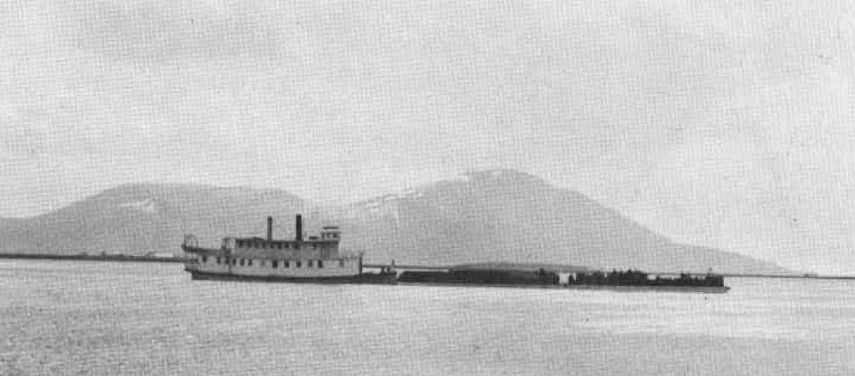
Klamath pushing barges in Lake Ewauna, circa 1907

Traffic was particularly heavy in August 1908. Klamath was heavily loaded on every trip, and almost every other day a barge was brought in loaded with freight. At that time, almost all the freight to Klamath Falls was loaded onto the steamer and the barges at Teeters and brought to the city by water. With the approach of the railroad, merchants were going to be relieved from the need to stock up on supplies prior to the winter, which would disrupt supplies for several months.

=== Last run on the lower lake ===
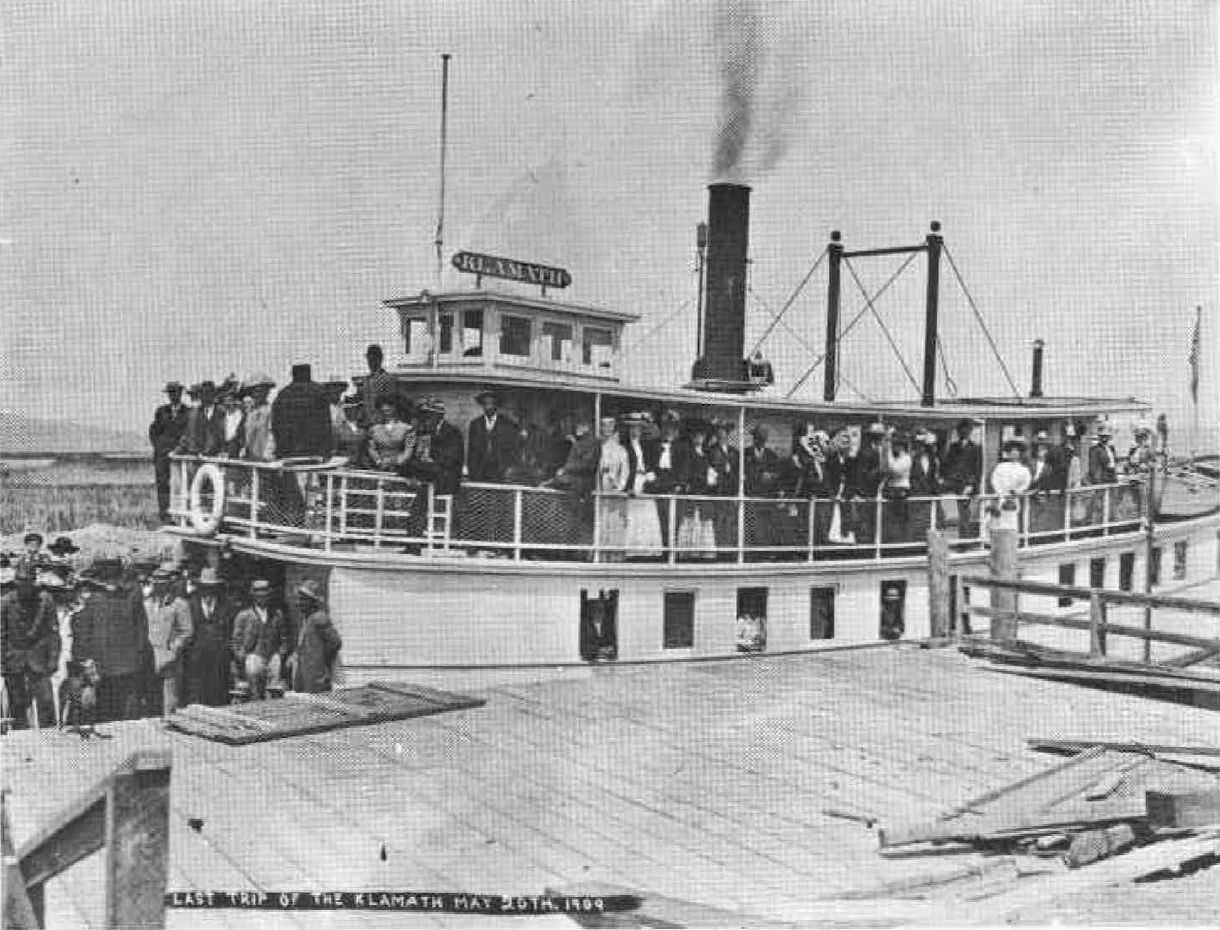
Last trip of Klamath on lower Klamath lake, May 20, 1909

The railroad reached Klamath Falls in May 1909. Klamath made its last commercial trip on the lower lake on Thursday, May 20, 1909. Shortly after 9:00 a.m. that day the steamer departed Klamath Falls bound for Teeter’s Landing (also known as Blidell and, later, Ady) with more than 100 people on board. A large crowd gathered at the docks to watch Klamath depart. When the steamer reached Ady, shortly before noon, the passengers disembarked and crowded on to the first train to run to Klamath Falls.

== Financial problems ==
In early September 1907, demands by creditors forced the Klamath Lakes Navigation Company into receivership. W.R. "Bill" Davis agreed to pay off the company’s debts, then about $10,000, and as security he was given a second mortgage against the company’s assets and was given control of the company.

On November 27, 1908, Klamath was mortgaged to the Ladd and Tilton bank, and William R. Davis, to secure the payment of a promissory note in the amount of $8,100 payable to the bank, due in one year, with annual interest of 8%, executed by the Klamath Lake Navigation Company in favor of the bank on November 12, and a similar note, executed in favor of William R. Davis, in the amount of $5,000.

The company fell behind in its payments on the debt to the bank and Davis. On February 7, 1912, notice was published that on March 9, 1912, under the terms of their mortgage dated November 27, 1908, Ladd and Tilton, and Davis, would conduct an auction at the dock at Shippington, to sell Klamath to satisfy the debt.

== Transfer to upper Klamath Lake ==
In 1909, the railroad reached Klamath Falls. This took away most of the business for Klamath on Lower Klamath Lake. On July 1, 1909, it was reported that plans were being made to transfer the boat to the upper lake, and that parties from Portland had come to Klamath Falls to investigate making bids to move the steamer. The plan at that time was to run Klamath on the upper lake to connect with the state line that ran from Crystal Creek to Crater Lake, allowing travelers departing Klamath Falls to reach Crater Lake 12 hours later.

The steamer was therefore transferred to upper Klamath Lake. A short water passage, called the Link River, ran from upper Klamath Lake to Lake Ewauna, along which lay the waterfront of Klamath Falls. However, the Link River was impassable to a large vessel like the Klamath. Transfer to the upper lake would require Klamath to be hauled overland.

This was done by dredging a cut from Lake Ewauna through the tule reeds to the railroad fill, near where the Big Lakes Mill.in the 1950s. A spur rail line was built out to Klamath, the boat was raised up on timbers, and two flat cars were run under the steamer. Blocks were placed under the boat to secure the load, and it was hauled to the upper lake and launched there in a similar fashion.

The move seems to have happened in the spring of 1910. A legal dispute arose over the payment of the contractors, with the company refusing to pay. The courts, however, ruled in favor of the contractors.

== Operations on upper Klamath Lake ==
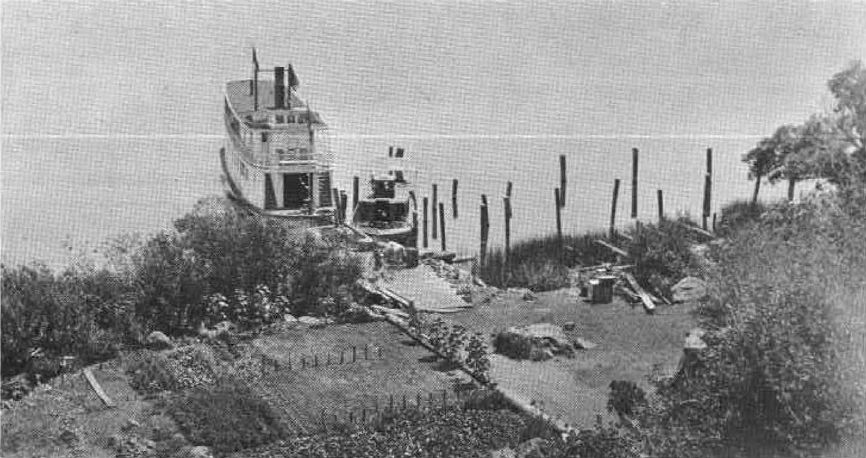
Klamath and gasoline launch Spray at Eagle Ridge landing, on upper Klamath Lake, circa 1910

By June 24, 1910, Klamath had been launched on the upper lake. Klamath had been on the shipways for two weeks undergoing repair. The boat had been taken to Shippington, where new tubes were to be installed in the boiler, and the vessels entire woodwork repainted and renovated.

=== Connections to Crater Lake ===
To serve tourists who it was anticipated would be taking the steamer on the route to Crater Lake the next summer, a dining room was fitted up. The plan for summer operations in 1910 was to have the steamer proceed from Klamath Falls with passengers to Agency Landing, where the tourists would disembark and then ride in automobiles to Crater Lake. Plans were then being made for the construction of Crater Lake Lodge, from which it was reported, the steamer Klamath could be seen at midday on the lake, some 40 miles (64 km) away.

=== Route on the lake ===
On July 1, 1910, Klamath made its trial run on upper Klamath Lake to Agency Landing. By May 1911, under Captain Ray H. Reed, Klamath was making daily trips to the resorts of Eagle Ridge Tavern and Rocky Point, as well as Doak’s Landing, Woodbine, and Odessa departing Klamath Falls from the Shippington wharf at 9:00 a.m. and returning at 5:00 p.m. The City Transfer bus picked up passengers for the steamer from the principal hotels in Klamath Falls, starting at 8:00 a.m. The Sunday excursions included a stop for three-and-a-half hours at the Rocky Point resort.

On Sundays, the fare was $1.00 for a round-trip excursion to all points on the lake. Tickets were sold at the hotels in Klamath Falls and also at the Navigation Building. After June 1, 1911, the Klamath was to connect at Rocky Point with the Crater Lake Auto Line for overland transport to Crater Lake and Medford.

About May 1911 or earlier Klamath had been converted into an oil-burner. An oil tank car was placed at the Pelican Bay Lumber Company’s railroad siding to refuel the steamboat. In 1911 and 1912, Klamath supported logging and lumber operations by towing log rafts to the Pelican Bay sawmill and carrying personnel and supplies for the lumber camps.

=== New owners plan reconstruction ===
In 1913, Klamath was owned by the Crater Lake Company, which, in November of that year sold the steamer to Pelican Bay Lumber Co. On November 12, 1913, the new owners announced plans to modify the steamer. The cabin structure was to be cut down to tug boat configuration, that is, mostly removed, with heavy towing bits placed in the center of the vessel. Living quarters for the crew were to be constructed in the forward part of the boat.

=== Navigation issues ===
At Pelican Bay, a short channel had been cut from the main lake to the Pelican Bay Lumber mill to facilitate steamboat operations.

On Saturday, July 22, 1911, at about 4:00 p.m., Klamath sank while moored at Agency Landing. The boat was then owned by Captain Parker. Part of the crew was sleeping on board when the boat sank. The stern went down in about 10 feet (3.0 m) of water, while the bow remained on the bank of the lake, almost clear of the water.

Ice posed a problem for the steamer on the upper lake, just as it had on the lower lake. In December 1913, Klamath suspended operations for the winter when ice on the upper lake was 4 inches (100 mm) or more thick.

On June 21, 1915, it was reported that Klamath had sunk, again, at Pelican Bay Landing the previous Sunday afternoon, June 20, 1915. Details were not available, however, in the first report.

In November 1916, a barge being pushed by Klamath collided with the small sternwheeler tug Modoc, sinking the latter. By November 16, 1916, Modoc had been raised.

== Abandonment ==
Klamath abandoned at log pond of Pelican Bay Lumber Company, March, 1948

About 1925, or earlier, Klamath was abandoned on the west side of Upper Klamath Lake, in the log pond of the Pelican Bay Lumber Company. The boat was abandoned in the channel cut for the steamer to access the sawmill. The remains of the steamer were still visible as late as the 1950s.

== Photo links ==
- Herald and News, Post Card Series, No. 67 Shows the steamer Klamath, docked at Klamath Falls, Oregon. The dock was located where George Nurse Way leads into Veteran’s Park from Main Street. A barge is visible behind Klamath. Also visible on the right is the forward part of the smaller steamer Canby.
- Oregon Digital, Gerald W. Williams regional album collection, p.303 Steamer Klamath, on lake, postcard, from 1908.
- Klamath Falls ACE Steamer Klamath on still water on the Klamath River near Ady landing, about 9 miles (14 km) south of Klamath Falls.
- University Washington, digital image collection, TRA635 Steamer Klamath, 1905, possibly at Laird’s Landing on Klamath Lake.
