= Corvallis Gazette-Times =

Daily newspaper published in Corvallis, Oregon

Coordinates: 44.563096°N 123.265839°W

- Type: Daily newspaper
- Format: Broadsheet
- Owner: Lee Enterprises
- Founder: T. B. Odeneal
- President: Matt Sandberg
- Editor: Penny Rosenberg
- Founded: December 1863, as The Corvallis Gazette
- Headquarters: 600 SW Lyon Street; P.O. Box 130; Albany, Oregon 97330; United States
- Circulation: 7,020 Daily (as of 2023)
- Sister newspapers: Albany Democrat-Herald
- ISSN: 0746-3995
- OCLC number: 10012551
- Website: gazettetimes.com

The Corvallis Gazette-Times is a daily newspaper for Corvallis, Oregon, United States. The newspaper, along with its sister publication, the Albany Democrat-Herald of neighboring Albany, Oregon, is owned by Lee Enterprises of Davenport, Iowa.

The paper in its current form was created in 1909 as the result of the merger of two competing weekly newspapers, The Corvallis Gazette (established 1863), and The Corvallis Times (established 1888).

Starting June 27, 2023, the print edition of the Gazette-Times will be reduced to three days a week: Tuesday, Thursday and Saturday. Also, the newspaper will transition from being delivered by a traditional newspaper delivery carrier to mail delivery by the U.S. Postal Service.

== History ==
=== Early Benton County newspapers ===
In 1854, during the political infighting over where to locate the seat of Oregon state government, Corvallis was briefly chosen by the legislature as state capital. As a result, pugnacious Democrat Asahel Bush, then serving as Territorial printer, moved his weekly Oregon Statesman from Salem to Corvallis to be close to legislative newsmakers. The tenure of the paper in Corvallis, like that of the state capital, was brief and fleeting and soon the town was left with no paper of its own.

Town founder Joseph C. Avery, himself a Democratic partisan, sought to fill the void with a new paper. He purchased press, type, and supplies and hired a small staff to launch a new publication called the Occidental Messenger in 1857. This short-lived publication was followed by a series of others which briefly glimmered and vanished like fireflies, including the Expositor, the Benton Democrat, and the Benton County Blade.

Two publications did manage to gain traction in Corvallis and Benton County, however — The Corvallis Gazette, a Republican paper established in December 1863, and the Benton Leader, a Democratic weekly, launched in 1882.

== The Corvallis Gazette ==
The Corvallis Gazette was launched in December 1863, during the midst of the American Civil War by T. B. Odeneal. The paper was initially operated as a weekly, with publication taking place each Saturday. The first two volumes of the paper had already gone missing by 1885 and exact details of its origin are consequently lost.

In February 1866, Odeneal was joined on the staff by William B. Carter, who assumed complete control of the paper in July of that same year, transforming it into an organ of the Oregon division of the International Organization of Good Templars.

Under Carter's editorship the Gazette became a leading voice for prohibition. This general orientation continued until March 1870, when a new ownership group took control of the paper, making Samuel L. Simpson the new editor of the paper. Simpson immediately noted the change in an editorial, writing:

Temperance ceases to be the speciality of this paper, as, in fact, it is not the forte of the present editor..... Right here the bright habiliments of neutrality are laid aside forever, and wheeling into line the good champion of prohibition goes down in the smoke and fury of political war.

This third iteration of the paper would become a vigorous partisan supporter of the agenda of the Republican Party. Carter would soon return to the editorial chair, with the paper's new political line unaltered.

In January 1876, the size of the Gazette was enlarged and in December of that same year the publication was made into a corporation, with editor William Carter one of the three incorporators. Carter's supremacy would end with his death in 1880, with fellow incorporator James A. Yantis taking over the operation of the publication until its eventual sale to M. S. Woodcock in May 1881.

In 1885, Corvallis pioneer Bushrod Washington Wilson and two other investors established the Gazette Publishing Company, which purchased the Corvallis Gazette from its previous publisher, Woodcock, on December 25. This holding company published the paper for only one year before selling the paper again, this time to Frank Conover.

Later editors of the paper included W. P. Keady, later Speaker of Oregon House of Representatives in the Oregon Legislative Assembly; Will H. Parry who later founded the Capital Journal in Salem, Oregon; and later Springer, who launched the Gazette's daily edition in 1909.

The Gazette was known briefly as a The Union Gazette following its 1899 merger with the Oregon Union which had been founded in 1897. The Union portion of the name was soon dropped. (A previous Corvallis newspaper called Union, published in the 1860s, was not affiliated. It was suppressed following the Civil War.

== The Corvallis Times ==
The Times traces its lineage first to the founding of The Corvallis Chronicle in 1886. During the 1880s the construction of the Oregon Pacific Railroad dominated local politics in Corvallis and surrounding Benton County. The Gazette's owners, M.S. Woodcock, A.P. Churchill, and Wallace Baldwin, who had taken over the paper in 1884, were closely allied with the interests of the railroad.

Gazette editor C.A. Cole was, according to one account, fired for refusing to obey instructions of the paper's owners to support a Democratic, pro-railroad candidate for state senator. He lost his job the day after the election. Wishing to explain to the community why he had been fired, Cole secured permission to publish an issue under the condition that the proofs first be submitted for approval by a railroad representative. Cole never did submit the proofs for approval.

Republicans, sensing opportunity, decided to finance another paper. The Corvallis Chronicle debuted as a weekly paper published on Fridays in 1886, with Cole as its editor. The paper did not succeed and soon folded.

In 1888, a local businessman, Robert Johnson, who had previously worked as city editor of The Gazette, bought the Chronicle's printing press and assets at a sheriff's auction. He launched The Corvallis Times with the slogan "Independent, Fearless and Free." Johnson operated The Times until 1893 when he sold it to Benjamin Franklin Irvine, a telegraph operator for the railroad. Irvine acquired another area newspaper The Benton Leader, founded in 1882 with The Times.

== The Gazette and Times combine ==
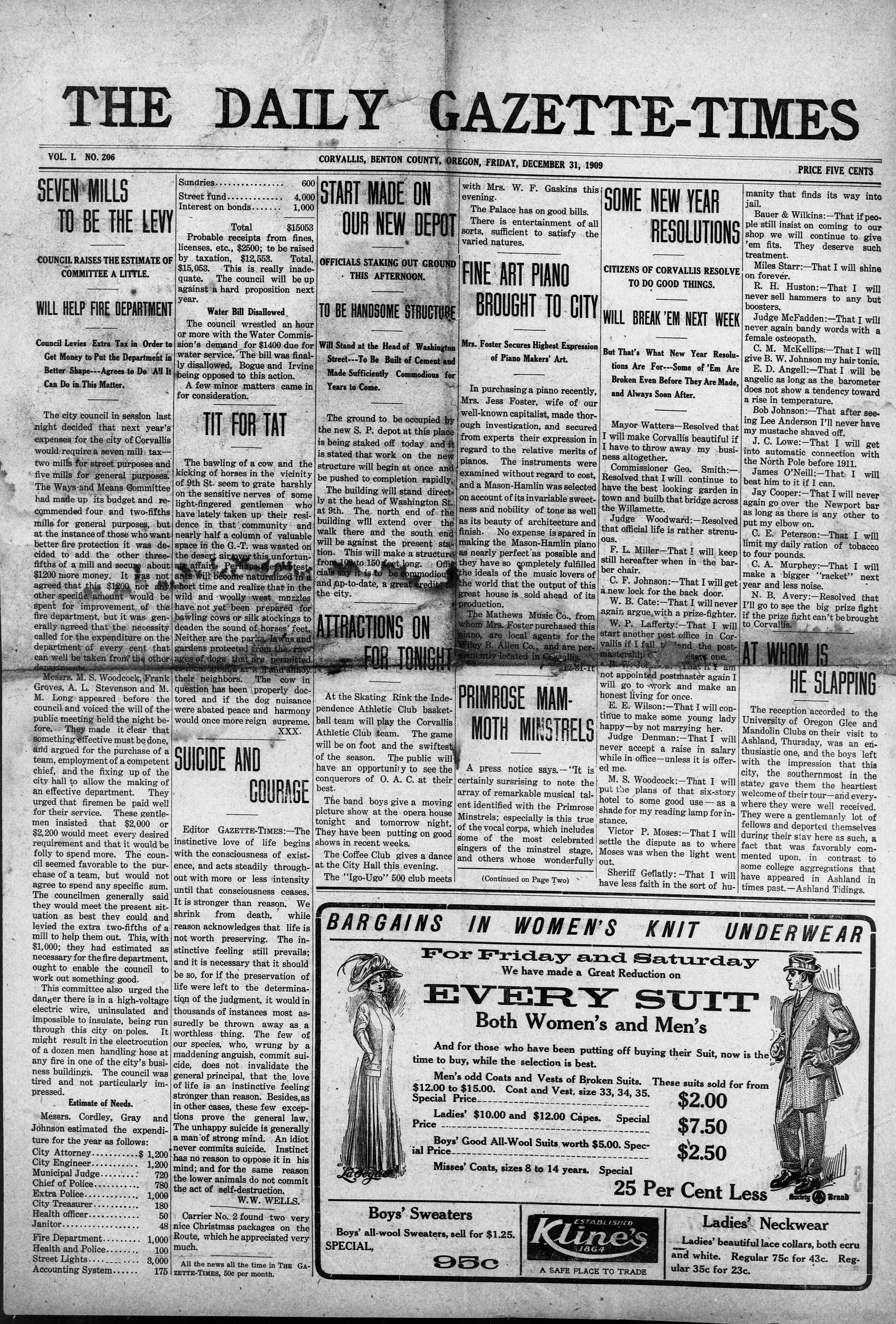
The Daily Gazette-Times in 1909

The events leading to the combination of Corvallis' two major newspapers began in 1908.

The Times was operated by N.R. Moore, who had leased the paper from B.F. Irvine, who had left Corvallis to write editorials for the Oregon Journal in Portland, Oregon. The Gazette was under the direction of Charles L. Springer, formerly of Montesano, Washington and owned by M.S. Woodcock, a prominent Benton County lawyer and businessman who later opened a successful bank in the county, and later served as Corvallis Mayor. According to historical accounts, they decided on the name Gazette-Times after a coin toss.

Springer had come to town and purchased the Gazette and published its first daily edition on May 1, 1909. It had four pages and five columns. Moore also had plans to launch a daily edition. Still, neither Springer, nor Moore had sufficient resources to publish a daily newspaper over the long term. They agreed to consolidate, and flipped a coin to decide the name. The first issue of The Gazette-Times appeared on July 2, 1909.

Claude Ingalls, who came to Corvallis from Washington, Kansas, bought out Springer's share in the paper in 1915. Myron K. Myers bought out Moore's share in 1923. Myers' son, Bruce, later shared ownership with Ingalls' son, Robert C. Ingalls. They assumed the top positions at the paper when their fathers retired in 1950.

Charles A. Sprague, originally from Kansas, spent some time (from 1925-1929) as one-third owner of the Corvallis Gazette-Times before moving to Salem and becoming part owner of the Oregon Statesman there.

Lee Enterprises bought the newspaper on October 1, 1969, and continues to operate it to the present day.

== The Philomath Express ==
On September 23, 2020, The Philomath Express published its last weekly edition. It is now accessed through a community website at the Gazette-Times online edition. The paper operated for nearly six years and was managed by Brad Fuqua throughout its lifespan. It was published by the Gazette-Times's owner Lee Enterprises.

== Microfilm availability ==
- Corvallis Gazette - April 22, 1865 to Dec. 30, 1898 (in 4 reels). OCLC 10520459. Master negative: University of Oregon.
- Union Gazette - 1898-1900: Not extant.
- Corvallis Gazette - April 27, 1900 to April 30, 1909 (in 11 reels). OCLC 30613075. Master negative: University of Oregon.
- Corvallis Times - 1888 (in 1 reel). OCLC 09987367. Master negative: University of Washington.
- Corvallis Times - Aug. 2, 1893 to June 25, 1909. (in 6 reels). OCLC 36710809. Master negative: University of Oregon.
- Daily Gazette Times - Jan. 1, 1910 to June 17, 1921 (in 13 reels). OCLC 36710789. Master negative: University of Oregon.
- Weekly Gazette Times - May 10, 1912 to Dec. 30, 1920 (in 3 reels). OCLC 36710855. Master negative: University of Oregon.
- Corvallis Gazette-Times - 1921 to date. OCLC 10012551.
