= Seal Rock, Oregon =

- Unincorporated community
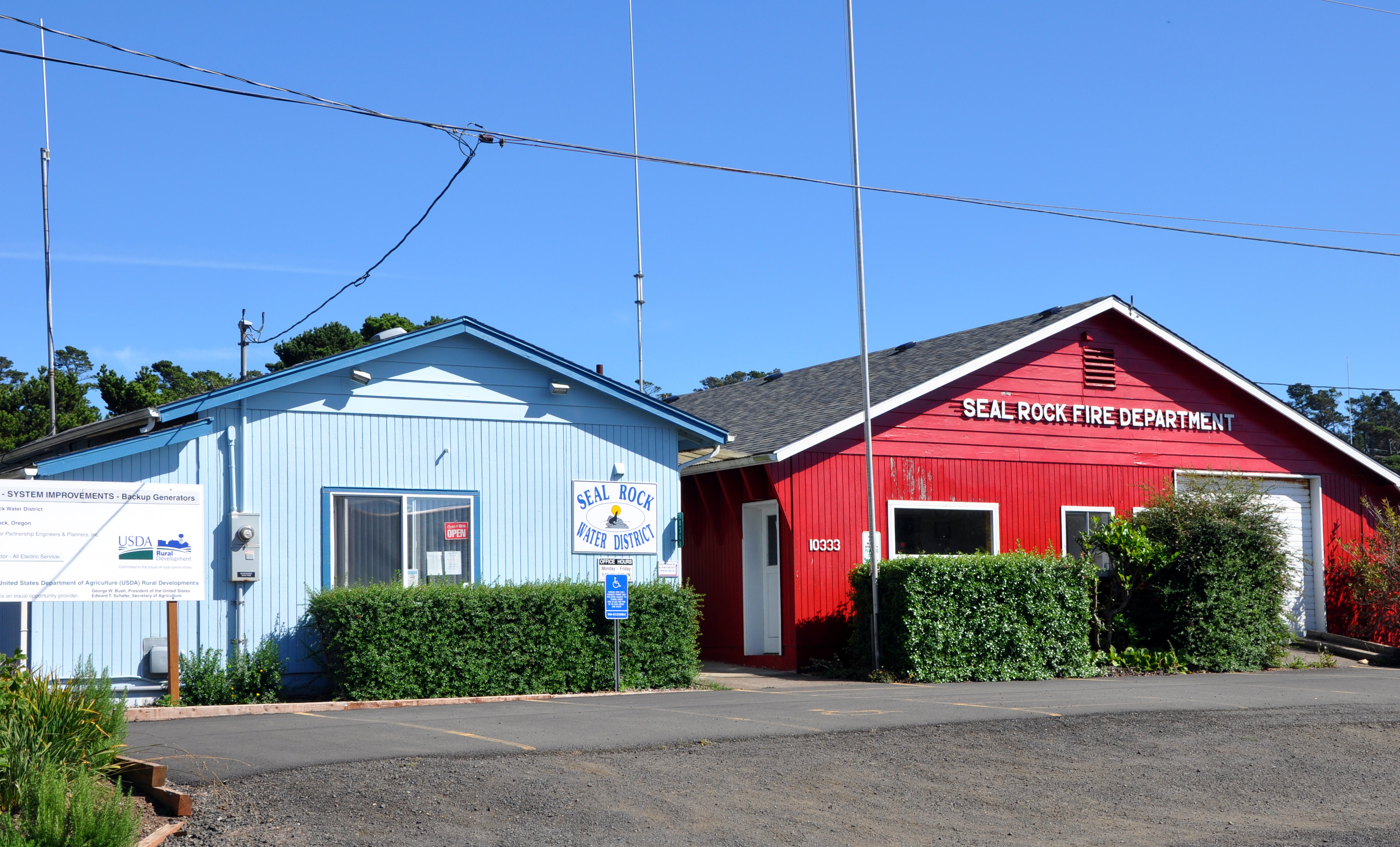
- Fire department and water district buildings

- Location within Oregon Location within the United States
- Coordinates: 44°30′00″N 124°04′56″W
- Country: United States
- State: Oregon
- County: Lincoln
- Elevation: 7 ft (2.1 m)
- Time zone: UTC-8 (PST)
  - Summer (DST): UTC-7 (PDT)
- ZIP code: 97376
- Area code: 541
- GNIS feature ID: 1149192

Seal Rock is an unincorporated coastal community in Lincoln County, Oregon, United States, between Newport and Waldport on U.S. Route 101.

The community of Seal Rock is named for the Seal Rocks, a ledge of partially submerged rocks that parallel the shore for about 2.5 miles (4.0 km). In Chinook Jargon the area was called Seal Illahe, meaning "seal place" or "seal home", while "Seal Rocks" is what the locality was called in pioneer times, when it was an early resort community. The name "Seal Rock" appears to refer to the one large rock, about 20 feet (6.1 m) above water, that was formerly where hundreds of common seals and Steller sea lions would rest.

Seal Rock was the terminus of the Corvallis & Yaquina Bay Wagon Road, which was the first road to reach the Oregon Coast from the Willamette Valley. The town of Seal Rock was platted in 1887 and three blocks of hotels were built, but development lagged and the assets of the road company were transferred to the promoter of the Oregon Pacific Railway, T. Egenton Hogg. Seal Rock post office was established in 1890.

Seal Rock is also the name of an address-restricted archaeological site in the vicinity that is listed on the National Register of Historic Places.
