= Corvallis station =

- Willamette Valley and Coast Railroad Depot
- U.S. National Register of Historic Places
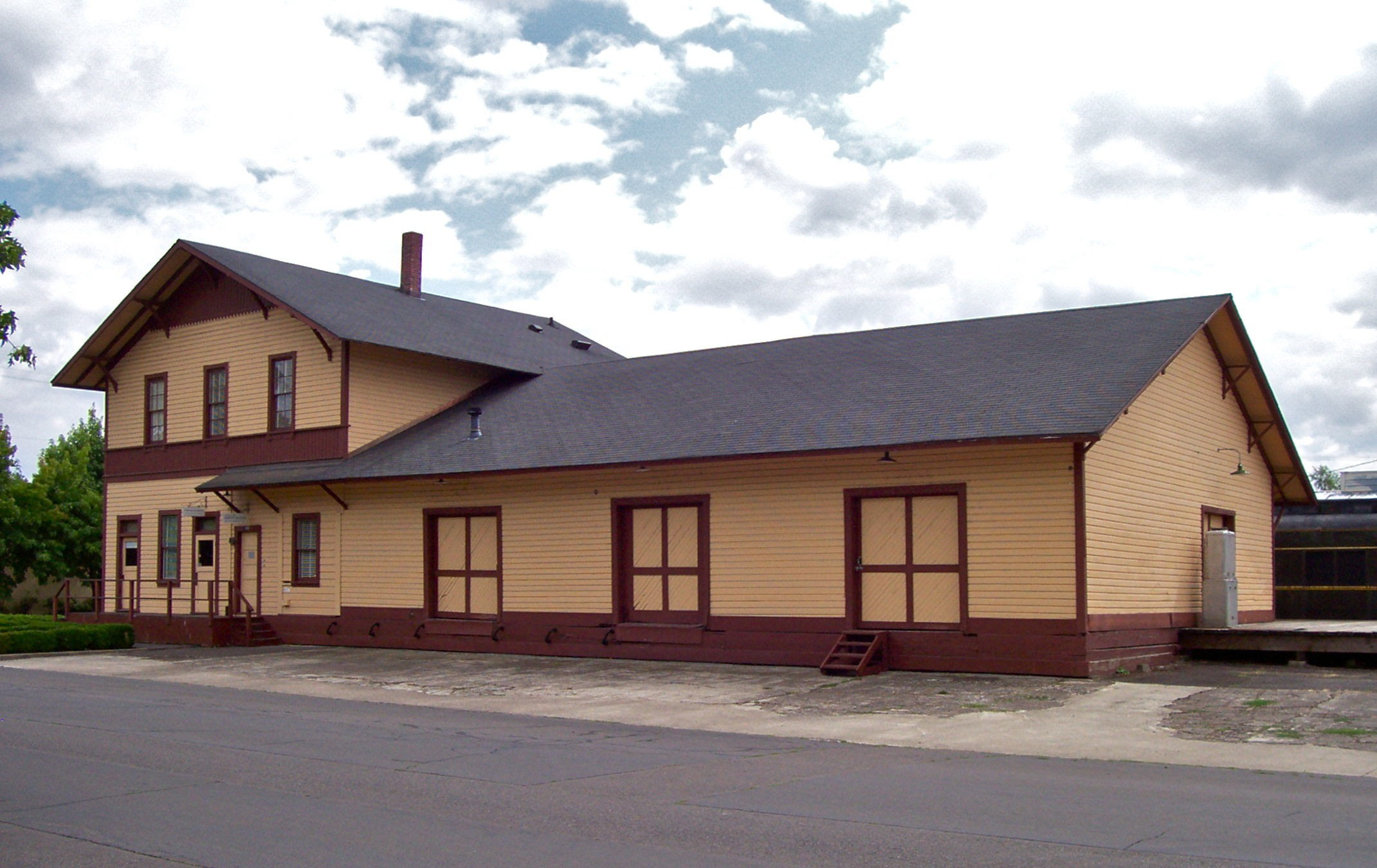
- Willamette Valley and Coast Railroad Depot in 2009

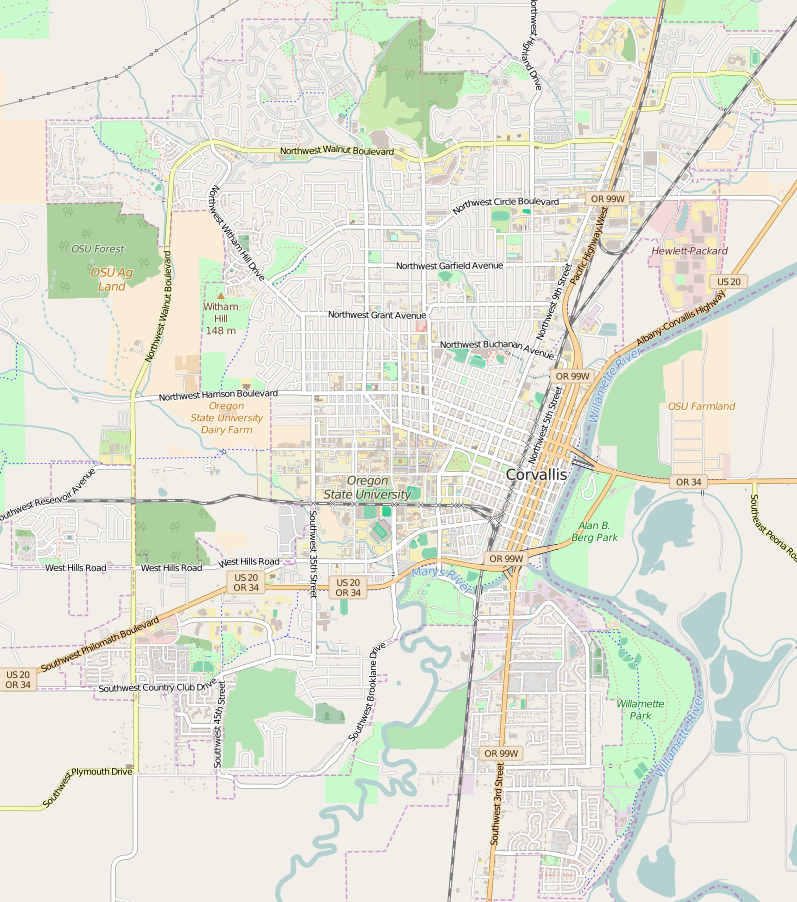
- Location within Corvallis OR Location within Oregon
- Location: 500 SW 7th St, Corvallis, Oregon
- Coordinates: 44°33′41.2″N 123°16′2.9″W
- Built: 1887
- Architectural style: Stick (also known as "Swiss Chalet" style)
- NRHP reference No.: 97000137
- Added to NRHP: February 21, 1997

The Willamette Valley and Coast Railroad Depot is a former railway station located in Corvallis, Oregon, listed on the National Register of Historic Places. It was constructed in 1887 by the Willamette Valley and Coast Railroad (WV&C), which since 1880 had been controlled by the Oregon Pacific Railroad Company. That railroad went bankrupt in 1894 and was replaced in 1895 by the new Oregon Central and Eastern Railway, which was reorganized as the Corvallis and Eastern Railroad in 1897. The depot is also known as the Corvallis and Eastern Freight Depot (Corvallis).

The depot was originally located at a different site, on Washington Avenue near 9th Street. The rail line was sold to Southern Pacific Railroad (SP) in December 1907. In 1910, the building was moved to a site on 7th Street at Western Blvd., replaced by a new cast-stone SP depot at the original location, but remained in use for freight at its new location. In 1927, it was moved yet again, to its present site, on 7th Street at Washington Avenue. The rail line on which the former WV&C Railroad depot is located has been leased by SP to the Willamette and Pacific Railroad since 1991. Of properties inventoried up to 1997, this depot is the oldest surviving two-story, wood-frame railroad depot in Oregon. The station was added to the NRHP in 1997.

Preceding station	Southern Pacific Railroad	Following station
Terminus	Red Electric Lines	Corvalis Junction toward Portland

== See also ==
- National Register of Historic Places listings in Benton County, Oregon
- Bushrod Washington Wilson
