= Thomas Egenton Hogg =

Confederate naval officer

- Born: 1828; Baltimore, Maryland, U.S.
- Died: December 8, 1898 (aged 69–70); Philadelphia, Pennsylvania, U.S.
- Military career
- Allegiance: Confederate States of America
- Branch: Confederate States Navy
- Service years: 1863–1865
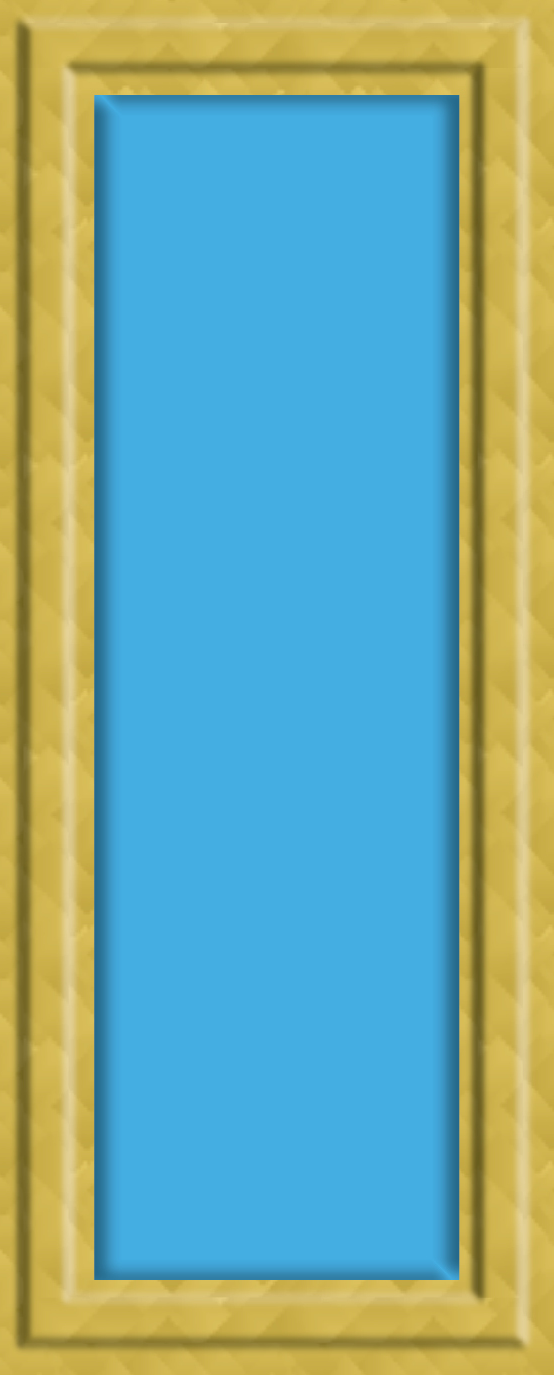
- Rank: Master
- Other work: Railroad promoter, Corvallis, Oregon

Thomas Egenton Hogg (1828 – December 8, 1898) was a Confederate naval officer who participated in raids on Union ships during the American Civil War. He was captured and sentenced to death, but was eventually released from prison, after which he became a businessman and railroad promoter in the U.S. state of Oregon. He worked to build the Oregon Pacific Railroad, though his dream to create a transcontinental railroad with its western terminus on the Oregon Coast was never realized.

== Early life ==
Hogg was born in Cecil County, Maryland, in 1828, the son of William Hogg, a prominent Baltimore merchant, and Jane Moffitt Hogg. By 1861, Hogg had moved to Louisiana. That year, the state seceded from the United States of America and joined the Confederacy, and Hogg was sympathetic to their cause.

== Civil War ==
On November 16, 1863, Hogg and five other Confederate sympathizers from Ireland boarded the Joseph L. Gerrity, a Union schooner loaded with cotton, in Matamoros, Mexico. On November 26, they seized the ship without harming the crew and then abandoned them on the Yucatán Peninsula. The pirate crew proceeded to Belize in the British Honduras, where with forged documents that gave the ship the new name Eureka, they sold the ship's cargo. By this time, the ship's real crew had alerted British authorities; Hogg and one other man escaped into Nicaragua and across the Isthmus of Panama, but British authorities captured three others in Liverpool, charging them with piracy.

Word of Hogg's success in capturing the ship and eluding capture reached Confederate Navy Secretary Stephen Mallory. In May 1864, Mallory instructed Hogg to seize a Union steamship, either the Salvador or the Guatemala, and use it for commerce raiding of Union shipping along the West Coast and the whaling fleet in the Pacific Ocean. On November 10, 1864, Hogg's party boarded the Salvador in Panama City to carry out the plan, but Union officials had received word of the plot and a party from the USS Lancaster arrested Hogg and his men.

Hogg was sentenced by a military commission to be hanged for violating the rules of war, but his sentence was commuted to life imprisonment by Union General Irvin McDowell. Hogg began serving his sentence at Alcatraz in 1864 and was transferred to San Quentin in August 1865. On May 7, 1866, he was released from prison on the orders of President Andrew Johnson.

== Oregon railroad interests ==
In 1871, Hogg moved to Corvallis, Oregon, where he styled himself a "Colonel" despite having no military claim to the title. Hogg began exploring the idea of building a railroad from Corvallis to the Oregon Coast, following the route of the existing Corvallis and Yaquina Bay Wagon Road. Hogg began gathering investors, who were sold on the idea of reducing the time it took Willamette Valley farmers to get their produce to California. In October 1872, Hogg incorporated the Corvallis and Yaquina Bay Railroad; two years later, he re-incorporated it as the Willamette Valley and Coast Railroad and obtained land grants from the state in what is now Lincoln County on which to build the railroad. The company made little headway in raising capital and building until Hogg teamed with Corvallis banker Wallis Nash. In 1880, Hogg and Nash incorporated the Oregon Pacific Railroad and began promoting the idea of Corvallis as the hub of a transcontinental railroad that would establish Newport as the "San Francisco of the North" to east coast financiers. Hogg and Nash raised millions of dollars. In 1885, The line was completed from Yaquina on the Oregon Coast to Corvallis across the Oregon Coast Range, and in 1887, the Corvallis Depot was completed.

But the railroad was running into difficulty. Established shippers who used Portland and Astoria opposed the new route and bought up land adjacent to the land grants to make routing difficult. Other problems included the fact that the Yaquina Bay harbor was too shallow for large ships, which was not an issue for the Columbia River; moreover, building the railroad over the mountains proved to be expensive and plagued by mismanagement of funds.

Eastward from Corvallis, the line made it as far as Idanha, 15 miles (24 km) short of Santiam Pass, though a line was taken up Santiam Pass to what is now Hogg Rock, to preserve the right of way. By 1891, the railroad was out of money and went into receivership. In 1895, it was purchased at a sheriff's auction by lumberman A. B. Hammond and the railroad's name was changed to Oregon Central and Eastern Railroad, and later to the Corvallis and Eastern Railroad.

== Death ==
Hogg moved back to Baltimore with his wife Naomi, a native of England who was 35 years his junior, in the late 1880s. They purchased his parents' farm, "Kidd's Purchase". There, they built a large estate that he named Cecil Manor. The house, one of the most expensive homes in Maryland at the time, was destroyed by fire in 1890. On December 8, 1898, he died of apoplexy on a streetcar in Philadelphia, Pennsylvania.

Due to his efforts to build a railroad over the Cascades at that location, Hogg Rock at the top of Santiam Pass is named for him, and Santiam Pass itself was previously named Hogg Pass.

== Land holdings and intrigue ==
Hogg had retained thousands of acres of land in Oregon granted to him for the railroad, but after his death, the estate became mired in legal entanglements. His attorney was Schuyler C. Spencer, who had studied in the law offices of Edgar D. Crumpacker of Indiana, and who was one of the founders of what would become the Portland law firm of Schwabe, Williamson & Wyatt. Spencer worked to restore 15,000 acres (61 km^{2}) to Hogg's widow Naomi in 1908, and within two years, had divorced his wife and remarried Mrs. Hogg. In 1920, in what was attributed to his ill health and financial concerns over a horse farm they owned, Spencer attempted to kill his wife with a revolver. She survived, but Spencer then turned the gun on himself, committing suicide.
