= Three Sisters (sternwheeler) =

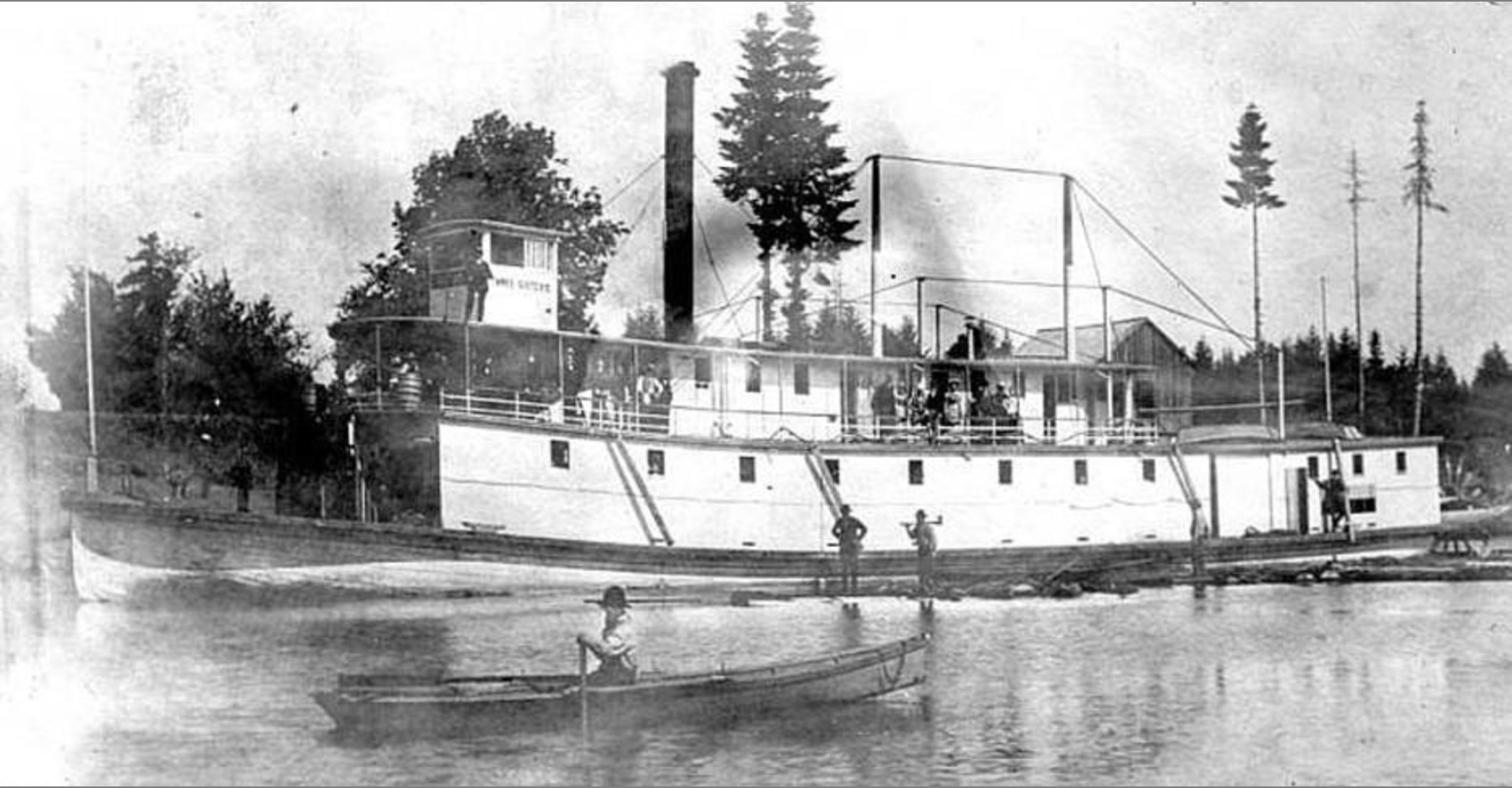

History
- Name: Three Sisters
- Owner: Oregon Pacific Railroad Company
- Route: Willamette River
- Completed: 1886
- Fate: Dismantled, 1896, at Corvallis, OR

General characteristics
- Class & type: Riverine towboat
- Length: As built 120.7 ft (36.8 m) over hull (exclusive of fantail); as reconstructed 1888: 140.7 ft (42.9 m)
- Beam: 30.2 ft 9 in (9.4 m) over hull (exclusive of guards
- Depth: 4.4 ft 0 in (1.34 m)
- Decks: two (main and passenger)
- Installed power: twin steam engines, horizontally mounted, each with bore of 12 in (304.8 mm) and stroke of 4 ft (1.22 m); 144 indicated horsepower
- Propulsion: stern-wheel

Three Sisters was a sternwheel-driven steamboat that operated on the Willamette River from 1886 to 1896. The steamer was built as an extreme shallow-draft vessel, to permit it to reach points on the upper Willamette river such as Corvallis, Harrisburg and Eugene, Oregon during summer months when water levels in the river were generally low. The vessel was also known for having been washed up on a county road in Oregon during a flood in 1890.

== Nomenclature ==
The steamer was named by the president of the Oregon Pacific Railroad, C.L. Hogg, for the Three Sisters mountains in the central Cascades Mountains of Oregon.

== Construction ==
Three Sisters was built in 1886 at Portland, Oregon by the Oregon Development Company, which was a branch of the Oregon Pacific Railroad Company. On June 29, 1886, the steamer was to have been inspected by William M. Hoag, general manager of the Oregon Pacific Railroad, and Wallis Nash. The steamer had been recently completed, and if it was found to meet contract requirements, would be accepted into the company’s service.

As built in 1886, Three Sisters was 120.7 feet long, measured over the hull, exclusive of the extension over the stern, called the fantail, on which the sternwheel was mounted. The width or beam of the vessel was 30.2 feet, exclusive of the guards, and the depth of hold was 4.4 feet. Overall size of the vessel was 320.79 gross and 292.29 registered tons.

The draft while “light” (without cargo) was just 13 inches. Cargo capacity of the Three Sisters was about 180 tons of sacked wheat.

Three Sisters was equipped with two horizontally mounted steam engines, each with a bore of 12 inches and a stroke of 4 feet. These engines of Three Sisters generated 144 nominal horsepower. Fuel consumption was about one-twelfth of a cord of wood for every mile run.

The official merchant vessel registry number was 145,423. Three Sisters was equipped with a steam-powered capstan built by Providence Steam Windlass Company.

== Operations ==
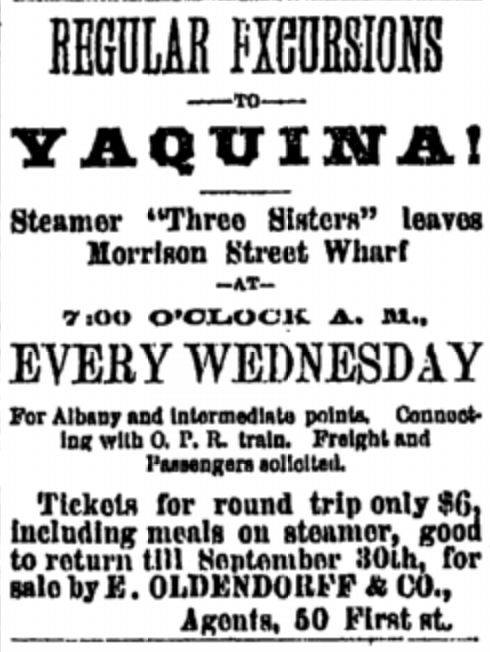
Advertisement for excursions to Yaquina Bay, carried in part by Three Sisters, July 20, 1887

Three Sisters began running on the upper Willamette River under Capt. J.L Smith. Capt. William Penn Short (1852-1938) was later placed in command for three years, and was succeeded by James D. Miller. In 1895 Capt. Robert Young was master, and Thomas J. Hardy (1840-1930) had been engineer for several years.

Three Sisters was part of a three-boat fleet belonging to the Oregon Pacific. The other steamers were the Wm. M. Hoag, 454.44 gross tons, built in Portland in 1887, and N.S. Bentley, 431.42 gross tons, built in Portland in 1886.

In August 1886 Three Sisters was engaged in transporting railroad construction material for the Oregon Pacific Railroad.

Low water in the upper Willamette River forced the N.S. Bentley off the route, and its place was taken by Three Sisters, running on a schedule of departing Albany, Oregon on Mondays and Thursdays at 1:00 p.m. for Portland.

Three Sisters would then depart Portland for Albany on Wednesdays and Saturdays at 7:00 a.m., arriving in Albany on Thursdays and Saturdays at 12 noon. In July 1887, the Oregon Pacific Railroad was advertising excursions, on a route including the steamboat Three Sisters, to Yaquina Bay, then undergoing development as a resort area. Three Sisters would depart every Wednesday at 7:00 a.m. from the Morrison Street wharf, for Albany and intermediate points. Round-trip tickets, good until September 20, 1887, cost $6, and included meals on the steamer. E. Oldendorff & Co. was the ticketing agent.

In March 1888, Three Sisters participated in an attempt to raise the sunken steamer N.S. Bentley.

== Reconstruction ==
In 1888, the hull of Three Sisters was lengthened by 20 feet. After the reconstruction, the measurements for the vessel following the reconstruction were length of 140.7 feet (exclusive of fantail), beam of 30.2, and depth of hold of 4.4 feet. The boat was hauled out at a shipyard in Portland on July 28, 1888. Captain W. P. Short expected the work to be complete in three weeks.

Post reconstruction, the gross tonnage (a measure of volume, not weight) was 358.33 and register tonnage was 327.33. The plan was to cut the hull in two and insert a twenty-foot long section. The work was done at the Willamette Shipbuilding Company, in East Portland. Upon reconstruction, the draft was expected to be 14 inches, about 6 inches less than before the rebuild, although whether this was in a loaded or light condition is not clear. W.P. Short stated that the steamer would have the lightest draft of any boat on the river, and he thought the vessel could operate year-round on the Willamette.

According to one report, there was to be no alteration of the boiler, engines, and machinery. However, according to another report, a new steel stern-wheel shaft was being brought in from Pittsburgh, Pennsylvania, and a new stern-wheel was being made.

In 1889, the steamer was reported to be able carry 140 tons of freight when loaded. Another report stated that after the reconstruction, the steamer could carry 125 to 200 tons of freight.

In 1888, the rebuilt Three Sisters was reported to draw only 13 inches of water, presumably this was while unloaded. Three Sisters was reported to have been the vessel with the least draft of any boat running on the Willamette in 1889, and was especially well suited to carrying on trade during the summer months, when water in the river was generally at its lowest.

On January 18, 1889, the ownership of the steamers Three Sisters and N.S. Bentley was transferred from the Oregon Development Company to the Oregon Pacific Railroad Company, at a total valuation of $33,265.42.

On August 13, 1899, the steamer somehow smashed into a free bathhouse in Portland, doing damage of $400 to the bathhouse.

== Stranded in flood ==
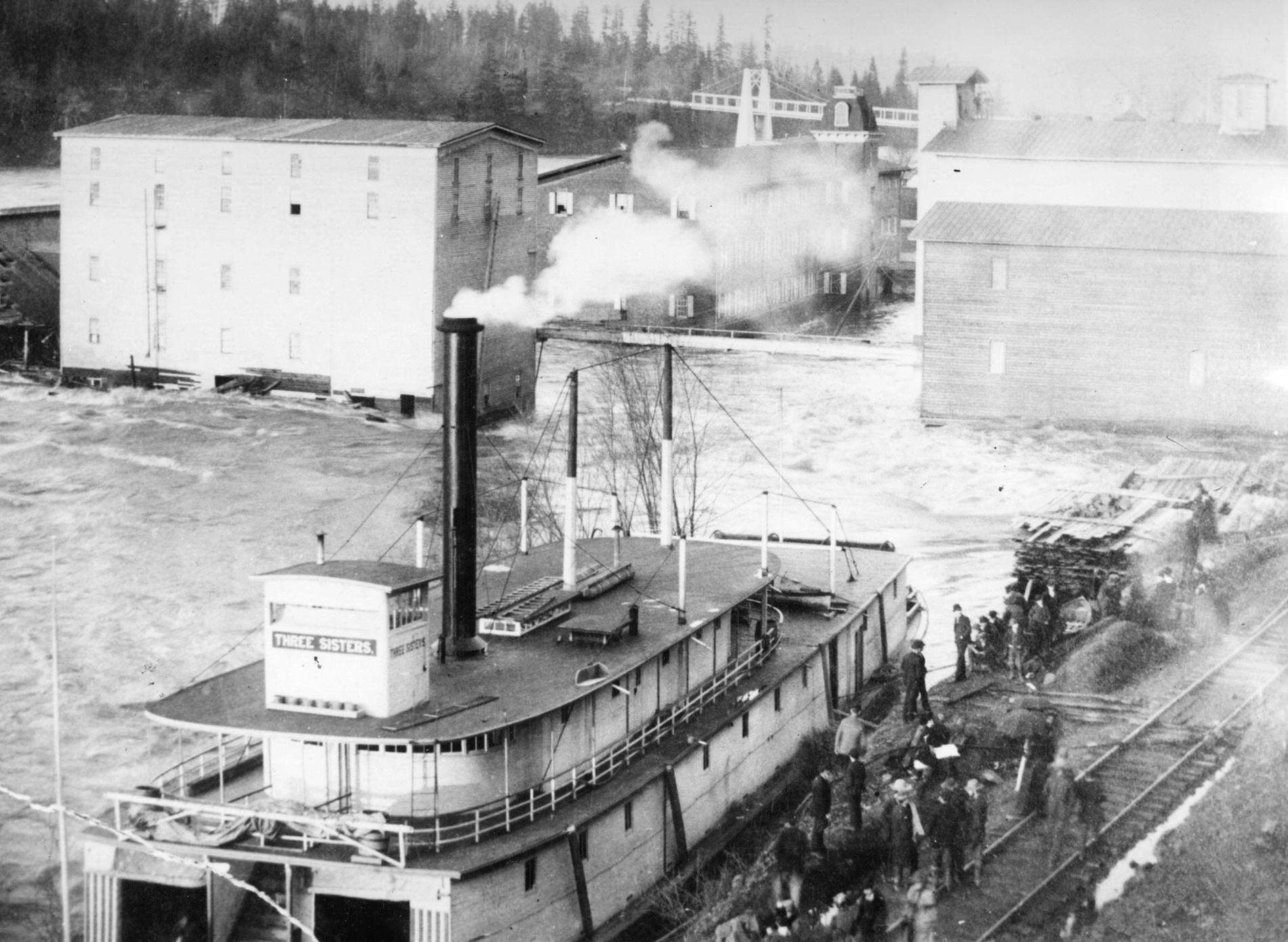
Three Sisters in the boat basin at Oregon City during the 1890 flood.

In early February, 1890, Three Sisters was stranded just upriver from Oregon City. On Wednesday, February 5, 1890, the river measured three feet higher than the great flood of 1862. The breakwater at the boat basin just above Willamette Falls was washed away. To save Three Sisters, which was at Oregon City at the time, up river from the falls, it was necessary to pull the vessel into the bank as closely as possible. The next day, Thursday, February 6, the water level feet off sharply, by three feet, leaving the steamer stranded out of the water on the road between Oregon City and Canemah, Oregon.

During the flood of 1890, the water level of the Willamette rose to 51.3 feet below the falls at Oregon City. Three Sisters, under Captain W.P. Short, had left Corvallis, where it was raining fast, with orders to stop at Wheatland, a small town downriver from Salem, and load the last shipment of wheat, 2500 sacks, for Oregon City.

When the boat reached Canemah, a little upriver from Oregon City, Captain Short tied the vessel up and went himself into Oregon City, where he wired the company’s manager, F.W. Bowen, in Corvallis, saying that he could take Three Sisters into the boat basin but he doubted whether he could get the steamer out. Bowen’s response to Short was: "Get that load of wheat into the basin. If you cannot get out, lay there until the water falls.

The water rose 8 feet in the first night after the steamer was brought into the boat basin. All sorts of debris were being washed downriver, including buildings, warehouses, big trees, and even a sawmill. Short was familiar with the banks around the boat basin, and he feared the flood erode them and cause boulders to fall down upon the steamer.

Short, with mate Albert Sass (d.1935) and engineer Thomas J. Hardy took steps to save the steamer. They lashed the boat up to the shore outside of the boat basin, on the east side of the river, where a road, submerged by then, ran between Oregon City and Canemah. Short pumped water ballast into the hull so the vessel would settle evening once the waters receded.

The crew kept 120 pounds of steam pressure in the boiler, just in case the nine lines running to shore, and attached to railroad tracks, trees, and rocks, proved insufficient to hold the steamer. If that occurred, their only option would have been to go over the falls. The boat was also in danger during this time from floating rafts of sawlogs which came a foot from the hull.

After about a week, the waters receded, and Three Sisters came to rest on the road, completely out of the water. Captain Bert Hatch, on the steamer Wm. M. Hoag, with Capt. George Raabe in command, brought up some house moving equipment from Salem, and with jacks and blocking tackle, Three Sisters was raised two or three feet. Blocking was put under the boat, and the vessel was left there to await refloating efforts.

Three Sisters was still out of the water on February 21, 1890, when bids were being taken to launch the vessel back into the river. The contract to relaunch the steamer was secured by H.L. “Bert” Hatch, of Salem, Oregon. The plan, as of March 8, 1890, was to raise the steamer about three feet up from the ground on blocks until the boat basin at Oregon City, which was damaged in the flood, could be repaired, then launch the vessel into the basin.

Three Sisters was out of the water for over three months. When the repairs to the boat basin were finally complete, the Oregon Pacific Railroad sent ship carpenters to the site from Yaquina Bay, with large timbers to construct a boat way under the steamer. The vessel was finally relaunched on July 6, and was then taken upriver to Corvallis.

== Operations 1890-1896 ==
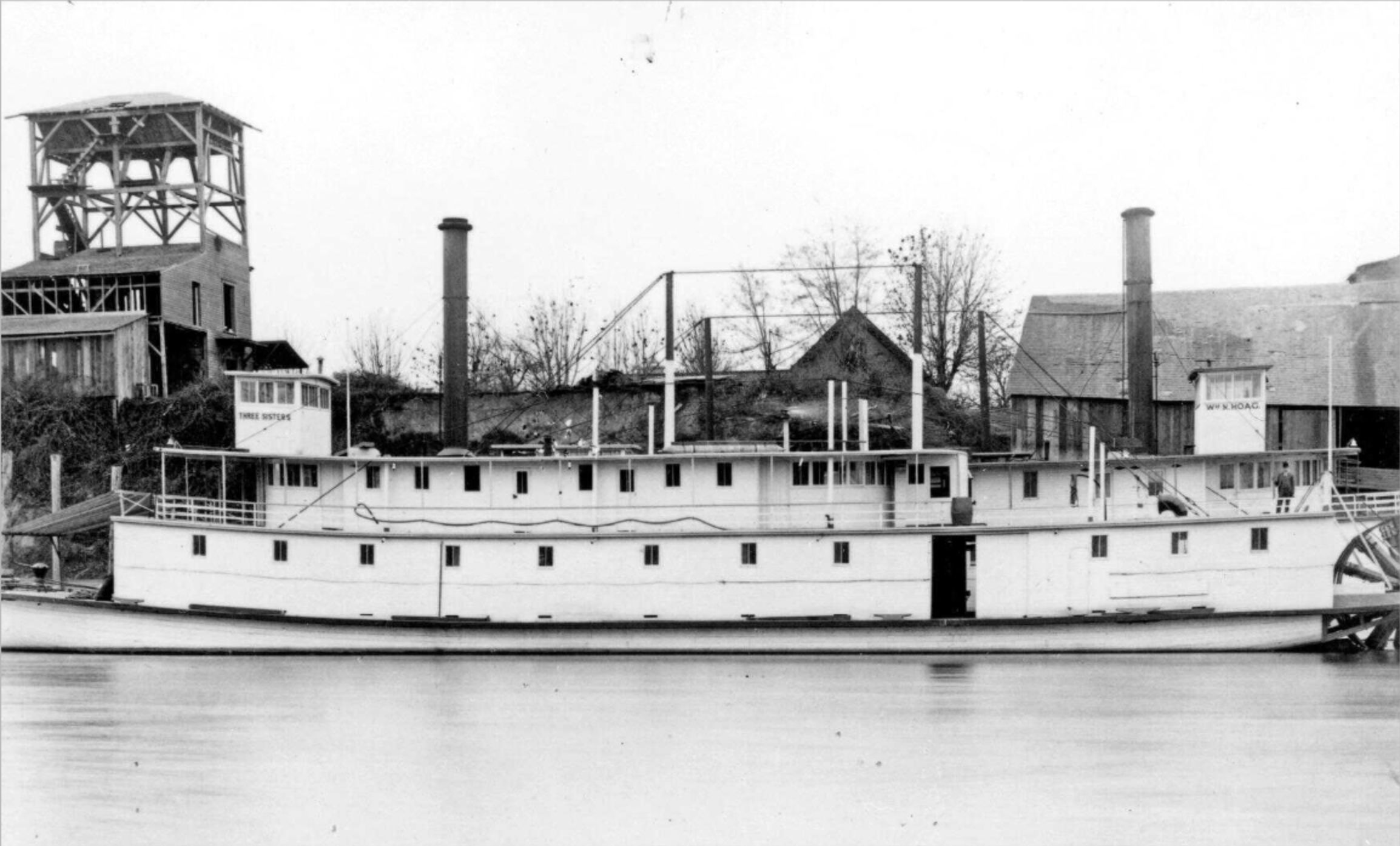
Steamers Three Sisters (front) and Wm. M. Hoag (rear), at Corvallis, Oregon, circa 1892.

In January 1892, the assets of the Oregon Pacific railway, including the steamer Three Sisters, were sold to satisfy the claims of the company’s bondholders.

In 1892 and 1893, the Oregon Pacific Railroad had fallen behind in paying the crew of its steamboats, including those of Three Sisters and Wm. M. Hoag. In April 1895, fourteen crew members filed suit in the U.S.District Court seeking to impose a maritime lien, called a libel on Three Sisters, for unpaid wages in 1892 and 1893 totaling $754.86.

River traffic was heavy in early 1893. On a round trip in May 1893 Three Sisters handled 131 passengers and 200 tons of freight.

To reach Harrisburg and Eugene, Oregon in the during the low water of the summer of 1893, the upper cabins of Three Sisters were stripped from the vessel, thus decreasing the draft of the vessel by three inches.

The steamer reached Harrisburg on August 14, 1893, carrying 16 tons of freight from Corvallis. This was considered a feat of navigation in the low water season. Three Sisters was expected to take 60 to 75 tons of freight, consisting mainly of sacks of wheat, downriver from Harrisburg.

As of July 1893 Three Sisters was insured for $13,000.

In March 1896, when the government snagboat Corvallis had sunk in the Willamette River, at the mouth of Meeks Slough, Three Sisters was hired to attempt to drag the Corvallis to a position where the snagboat could be raised.

== Dismantled ==
In April 1896, it was reported that “the jig is up with the old steamer Three Sisters.” During a recent high water period on the Willamette, Three Sisters had been hauled out on the riverbank downstream from Corvallis, and as of April 21, 1896, the plan was to dismantle the steamer. The hull was reported to have become so decayed and leaky that the owners decided that the steamer would no longer be of use.

By May 4, 1896, the work of dismantling the steamer was nearly complete. The lighter machinery had been removed and stored in an old warehouse near the O.C.& E depot at Corvallis. The boiler, the stern-wheel shaft, and other heavy pieces were left where they had been removed, and it was planned to build a temporary structure over them.

== Photo links ==
- Umpqua Valley Museum, image N10363 Steamers Three Sisters and Wm. Hoag racing on the Willamette.
- Old Oregon Photos, image CC0102 Three Sisters grounded after the 1890 flood (original from Clackamas County Historical Society).
