= Corvallis-Benton County Public Library =

Public library in Corvallis, Oregon, US

Coordinates: 44.56571°N 123.26436°W

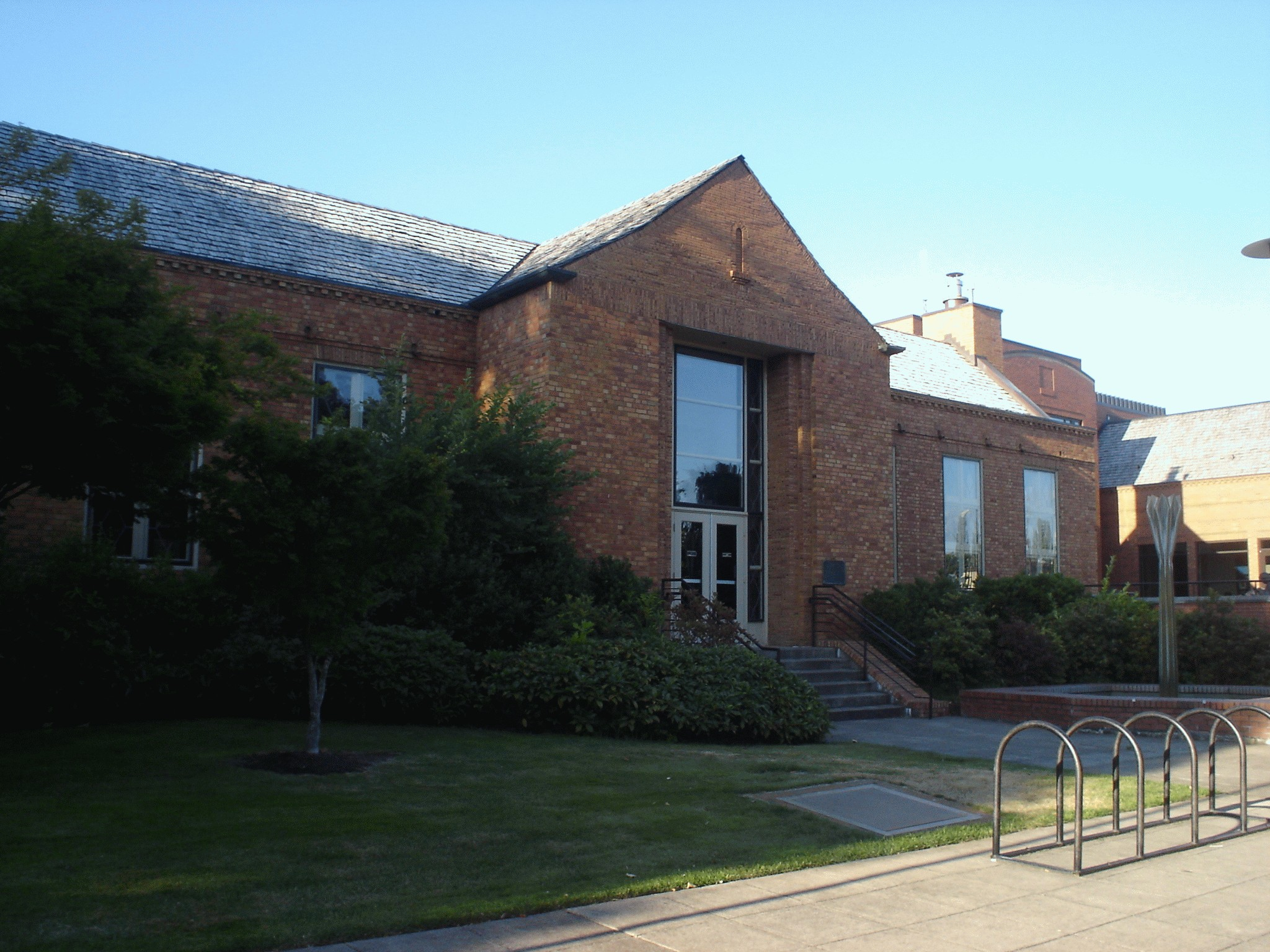
- Location: Corvallis, Oregon
- Established: 1932
- Branches: Central, 3 branches & 1 bookmobile

Other information
- Director: Ashlee Chavez
- Website: Corvallis-Benton County Public Library

The Corvallis-Benton County Public Library is a public library located in the American city of Corvallis, Oregon. The library's motto is "Enrich, excite, explore!" It is part of a city-county system with branches in Alsea, Monroe, and Philomath as well as a bookmobile.

== History ==
=== Origins ===
The first library in Benton County was a privately owned circulating library operated in Corvallis during the decade of the 1860s by a resident named J.W. Souther. Souther advertised in the local newspaper, the Corvallis Gazette the opportunity for subscribers to take advantage of his 730 volumes of "choice reading" for a fee of $5 per year.

Planning for a public library for the town of Corvallis, Oregon began early in the decade of the 1870s. In December 1872, acting response to public interest in the idea of a public library for the city, wealthy railroad investor Dr. J. R. Bayley announced that if a permanent public library association would be formed, that he would provide the group with use of a room inside a new brick building that he was in the process of constructing.

=== New library construction ===
The present library building was designed by architect Pietro Belluschi in 1932. A modest expansion followed in 1965 and a major reconfiguration and expansion in 1992.

In 2008, a history of the Corvallis-Benton County Library written by Thomas C. McClintock was published.

The library has been listed as one of the top ten libraries in the country (1997, 1999, 2000) based on population served by Hennen's American Public Library Ratings.
