= Ady, Oregon =

Unincorporated community in Oregon, United States

Coordinates: 42°04′45″N 121°50′44″W

Ady is an unincorporated historic locale in Klamath County, Oregon, United States.

== History ==
Ady takes its name from Abel and Leona Ady who operated the freight/passenger transfer station at Teeter's Landing on the Klamath River south of Midland, Oregon between about 1906 and 1909.

In prior years, northbound freight and passengers bound for Klamath Falls and other eastern Oregon destinations left the Southern Pacific main line at Weed, California, using the McCloud Railway to transit the southern slopes of Mt. Shasta to Bartle, California. Bartle is some thirty miles east of the mountain and, at that time, the southern terminus of the Bartle Fast Freight Road used by Stage Coaches and Freight Wagons to reach Laird's Landing on the southwest shore of Lower Klamath Lake. (Residual traces of the riverboat turnaround at Laird's Landing can still be seen at 41 degrees 52 minutes 21.44 seconds North / 121 degrees 43 minutes 24.73 seconds West). From Laird's Landing, the steamboat Klamath, carried the passengers and freight on to Klamath Falls via the Lost River and various canals.

Then in 1906, the Weed Lumber Company laid twenty miles of rails from Weed to Grass Lake northwest of Mt. Shasta (this section has since been abandoned). Grass Lake then replaced Bartle as the favored transfer point where northbound travelers and freight changed from rail to overland stage. The new route ran forty miles north to Teeter's Landing on the Klamath River south of Midland where the riverboat Klamath was met for the remaining ten miles north along the Klamath River and into Lake Ewauna and Klamath Falls. By cutting sixty miles from the trip, this route replaced the McCloud Railroad/Bartle Fast Freight Road.

In 1909 the Southern Pacific railroad was continued from Grass Lake to Klamath Falls, thereby ending the utility of the Teeter's Landing transfer station. (The inaugural run of the railroad from Teeter's Landing to Klamath Falls occurred on May 1, 1909; Abel Ady and his six-year-old son Aard were passengers.) The laying down of rails for much of that section of roadbed was made possible by the draining of the intervening marshland which had been covered with tules and several feet of water prior to that time.

Abel and Leona Ady became aware of the opportunity arising at Teeter's Landing sometime prior to 1906 when they were both teachers in Stockton, California. They acquired the concession at Teeter's Landing and operated it until the completion of the rail line from Grass Valley to Klamath Falls. Abel surveyed most of the roadbed for that section of rail and it was largely through the efforts of local farmers causing the marshland to be drained that the rail line between Teeter's Landing and Klamath Falls became possible.

Abel Ady was a leader of and representative for the group that petitioned the U.S. Government to achieve the goal of draining the marshland. Indeed, to prove the feasibility of draining the marsh for farmland, Abel Ady provided for use as an experimental "farm" a section of marsh that he owned a short distance east of Teeter's Landing. Dikes were constructed between the ends of "Wild Horse Butte" and a second nearby butte and the marsh between them drained and converted to farmland.

=== Ady nickname ===
By the time that the rail line from Weed to Klamath Falls (passing near Teeter's Landing) was completed, the transfer station at Teeter's Landing had popularly become known as "Ady". The railroad used the dike closing the east end of the buttes as a portion of the roadbed and since the east end of Wild Horse Butte was closest to Teeters Landing, the "whistle stop" for Ady was established there. The present day Ady canal takes its name from the same source.
