= N. S. Bentley =

Riverine Steamboat

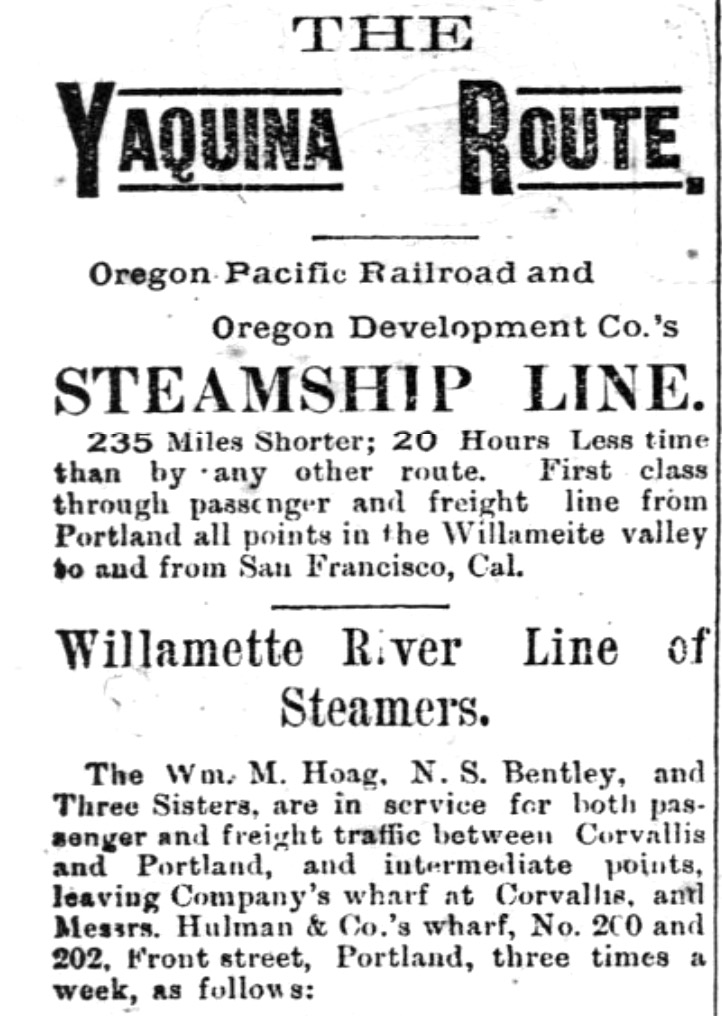
- Advertisement for steamer N. S. Bentley, and others, on Yaquina Route, May 3, 1889

History
- Owner: Oregon Pacific Railroad
- Operator: Open River Navigation Co.; Harkins Transportation Co.
- Port of registry: Portland, Oregon
- Route: Willamette, Columbia, and Cowlitz rivers
- Launched: December 13, 1886
- Identification: U.S. 130364
- Fate: Rebuilt in 1896 and renamed Albany.

General characteristics
- Class & type: riverine all-purpose
- Tonnage: 432 GT; 401 NT
- Length: Over hull (exclusive of fantail): 150.7 ft (45.9 m)
- Beam: Over hull (exclusive of guards): 32 ft (9.8 m)
- Draft: 34 in (0.86 m)
- Depth: 6 ft 6 in (1.98 m)
- Installed power: twin steam engines, horizontally mounted, each with bore of 16 in (40.6 cm) and stroke of 60 in (1.52 m)
- Propulsion: stern-wheel

N. S. Bentley, commonly referred to as simply Bentley, was a stern-wheel driven steamboat that operated on the Willamette River. Launched in East Portland, Oregon in December 1886, Bentley ran until 1896, when it was rebuilt and renamed Albany. Bentley was owned by the Oregon Pacific Railway, and was used as part of a rail and marine link from Portland to San Francisco, running down the Willamette, then to Yaquina Bay, and then by ocean steamer south to California.

== Name ==
N. S. Bentley was named for Norman Seymour Bentley, third vice president, treasurer, company secretary (in New York) of the Oregon Pacific Railroad.

== Oregon Pacific Railway ==
In January 1889, the Oregon Pacific Railroad advertised travel from Portland, Oregon to San Francisco, claiming its route to be 20 hours faster and 225 miles shorter than any other. Passengers and freight would travel by the railroad's river division on the Willamette River to either Albany or Corvallis, Oregon. The route shifted over to a railroad to Yaquina Bay, where it met an ocean-going steamer bound for San Francisco, the Willamette Valley. Coming north from San Francisco the reverse order would be followed.

With no rail connection in the Willamette Valley between Portland and Albany and Corvallis, the Oregon Pacific Railroad's River Division was a critical link in the route, providing three round trips a week. In January 1889 the river division consisted of three vessels, William M. Hoag, under Captain George Raabe, N. S. Bentley, under Capt. John P. Coulter, and Three Sisters, under Capt. William Penn Short. All three vessels were advertised as being "elegantly equipped."

South bound from Portland, one of the three river division boats would depart every Monday, Wednesday and Friday at 6:00 a.m., arriving in Salem the same day at 7:15 p.m. The steamer would then leave Salem on Tuesdays, Thursdays, and Saturdays at 6:00 a.m., arriving in Corvallis the same day at 3:30 p.m. Northbound traffic ran on a similar schedule, only in reverse, returning to Portland on Tuesdays, Thursdays, and Saturdays at 3:30 p.m.

In May 1889, the Oregon Pacific Railroad, advertising the "Yaquina Route", announced that its steamers on the Willamette River, Hoag and Bentley, would be departing southbound for Corallthree times a week from the Hulman & Co. wharf in Portland, at numbers 200 and 202 Front Street.

== Construction ==
The Oregon Pacific Railroad built two stern-wheel driven steamboats in 1886 to run on the Willamette River. The first was Three Sisters. The second was Bentley, which made its trial trip on December 13, 1886. Bentley was built in East Portland.

Bentley was 150.7 ft (45.9 m) long measured over the hull, exclusive of the extension of the main deck over the stern, called the fantail, on which the stern-wheel was mounted. Bentley had a beam of 32 ft (9.8 m) measured over the hull, and exclusive of the large protective timbers, called guards running outside of the top of the sides of the hull. Bentley's depth of hold was 4.5 ft (1.4 m).

The overall size of Bentley was 432 gross tons, and 401 net tons, with tons in this instance being a unit of volume and not weight. Bentley's merchant vessel registry number was 130364.

Bentley was driven by a stern-wheel which was turned by two twin single cylinder horizontally mounted steam engines, which had cylinder bore of 16 in (40.6 cm) and stroke of 60 in (1.52 m). The boiler appears to have been wood-fired.

== Captains ==
Bentley had a succession of well-known captains, James Leonard "Big Jim" Smith, followed by Civil War veteran John Pascal "J. P." Coulter, and after Coulter, Sherman V. Short.

== Operations ==
Bentley was intended primarily for service on the Willamette River. It made its trial trip on December 13, 1886, under Capt. J.L. Smith.

=== Sinking at Salem ===
Two weeks after its launch, Bentley sank at Salem, Oregon with 3,800 bushels of wheat on board. According to another report the sinking occurred at the Albany bridge. Bentley was raised, and on January 14, 1887, in bad condition, it steamed into the Steffen shipyard at Portland for repairs. Bentley was raised and returned to service with the Oregon Pacific Railroad.

Bentley sank in January 1887, at the Albany bridge. The boat brought down, in poor condition, to the Steffen yard in Portland for repair. On January 28, a newspaper reported that Bentley would be ready for active service again on February 1. A newspaper reported Bentley was to come back into active service on February 1, 1887.

=== Sinking near Lincoln ===
In March 1888 Bentley hit a snag on the Willamette River near Salem and sank in four feet of water. The steamer was reported to be likely a total loss as a result. The monetary loss was estimated to be $10,000.

The firm of Pacquet & Smith was engaged to raise Bentley, which had sunk down river from Lincoln. In early May 1888, Pacquet & Smith brought upriver two large scows and one small one, together with a crew of men, to raise Bentley, effect temporary repairs, and take the boat downriver to Oregon City, where permanent repairs were to be effected in the dry dock.

=== Resumption of operations ===
Bentley was back in operation on the Willamette as of June 30, 1888, running under Captain Sherman V. Short, who had previously been mate on the boat. On December 10, 1889, Bentley made the run from Albany to Corvallis in one hour and forty minutes. As of March, 1892, Bentley was running on two trips weekly between Albany and Portland, with J.P. Coulter as captain of Bentley, and Lee Beach as purser.

== Disposition ==
Bentley was rebuilt in 1896 for the Oregon, California and Eastern Railway and renamed Albany. In mid-February 1896 Albany made its first trip on the river.
