= Willamette Valley and Coast Railroad =

Railroad in Oregon

The Willamette Valley & Coast Railroad (WV&C) was a small 19th-century railway line in the American state of Oregon which sought to cross the Coast Mountain Range to connect the agriculturally oriented Willamette Valley with international shipping at Yaquina Bay. Following three false starts during the ten years after the American Civil War, the railway was launched in July 1874. Work was completed on the valley-to-coast road in 1884. The line is today operated by Portland and Western Railroad.

== History ==
=== Background ===
The Willamette Valley (in green) includes the bulk of Oregon's population. The Willamette Valley & Coast route approximates the red road line running from Newport to Corvallis.

From the earliest days in which surplus agricultural production existed in Oregon's Willamette Valley, producers desired a transportation system to allow their output to reach outside market through ocean ports. The size and fruitfulness of the valley seemed vast, including as it did some 3 million acres of land, of which 1 million was well adapted to grain production. The valley's mild climate and fertile soil made commercial production of other crops practicable, if only transportation difficulties could be resolved.

The early settlers of Benton County, Oregon were proactive in seeking to create such a railway line across the Coast Mountain Range running from the county seat of Corvallis to the Pacific port at Yaquina Bay, part of today's Newport through a natural gap in the mountains near Mary's Peak. A trail first established by Native American peoples followed the route, used as well by the European American pioneer settlers who followed them.

Commercialization of the path began in 1863 with the organization of a toll road company called the Wagon Road Company, headed by local doctor J. R. Bayley, to construct and maintain a wagon road through the gap. This toll road company's ranks were expanded in 1865 with additional investors.

On August 15, 1867, Articles of Incorporation were filed for a new entity called the Willamette Valley and Coast Railroad Company, with a group of 14 Benton County citizens listed as incorporators. This initial group failed to construct a railroad and gave way in October 1871 to a second company which included J. R. Bayley, Ben Simpson, and A. B. Meacham. This second group similarly failed to construct a railroad, although Messrs. Bayley and Simpson would soon return for the third iteration of the WV&C Railroad Company.

In 1871 members of the Wagon Road Company, taking advantage of a liberal land grant policy, filed for grants from the United States government which claimed staggered land sections running for six miles on either section of the road, thereby locking up the valuable path for future development and exploitation.

On October 14, 1872, a third Willamette Valley and Coast Railroad Company was established, with principals including J. R. Bayley and Ben Simpson from the second iteration of the firm, together with Colonel T. Egenton Hogg. The company listed as its objective the construction of a narrow gauge rail line from Yaquina Bay to a junction with the Oregon and California Railroad line in Linn County, located just to the east of Benton County. For the third time, this effort to construct a valley-to-coast railway line in Western Oregon was stillborn.

=== Launch ===
A fourth attempt to form a railway company came in July 1874, with G. W. Houck heading a group of 16 Benton County investors. This group successfully obtained a charter from the Oregon legislature which defined the methods by which bonds could be issued in an effort to oversee the firm's financial practices. As a means of subsidy, the railroad company was granted title to all tidal lands in Benton County and was to be exempted from all taxation for 20 years. In return, the WV&C consented to transport all troops and war materiel for the state of Oregon for the same 20-year period of time.

The legislature insisted that before this charter and its associated subsidies was made real, the company must first build 10 miles of its line. This distance was surveyed, running from Corvallis to the neighboring town of Philomath along the Marys River and local citizens turned out to grade the path of the line by hand.

With the first ten miles flattened and rocked, a search was initiated for investors. With no financial angels visible, Col. Hogg proposed that $35,000 be raised locally, this being deemed the minimum sum necessary to purchase iron rails for the 10 miles of track and a small locomotive to aid in the construction. This amount was duly raised and the ten miles of line built, but this exhausted the funds and patience of the community. Contributing to the disruption was the ongoing Long Depression of 1873-1879, which erased potential sources of speculative investment. Work on the WV&C came to an abrupt halt.

External funds at last became available by the summer of 1881 and in July Col. Hogg set the wheels in motion for construction of the line through to Yaquina Bay. It was also planned for the line to extend eastwards as far as Boise, Idaho at the appropriate juncture in the future. Sawmills were put into operation at various points along the proposed rail line and in August and September hundreds of Chinese coolies began to arrive in Corvallis in anticipation of working on the WV&C project. A parallel construction company called the Oregon Pacific Company, with Hogg serving as President of both firms, was established to coordinate work on the WV&C project.

=== Construction ===
Some 2,000 men and about 250 horses were set to work on the construction in summer 1881, with about 13 miles on the eastern end completed by the time the fall rains had arrived in force. The rainy season proved harsh and reduced the work site to a sea of mud, forcing shutdown of all but tunnel-drilling and lumber operations.

Further disruption was offered by the Depression of 1882, which made the raising of additional investment capital difficult. Hogg raised the necessary funds, however, enabling work to continue. The source of said funds remained a mystery, with one contemporary historian noting:

"No information was ever given by Colonel Hogg as to who were the chief supporters of the Oregon Pacific — but as one name after another was disclosed by circumstances, it was found that he had enlisted some of the wealthiest and most conservative of American capitalists..."

The state's charter with the WV&C called for completion of the Corvallis-to-Yaquina Bay route by October 14, 1884, but the line was not to be finished until the second week of December of that year, with plans made for a ceremony to drive the final spike in the line about 15 miles outside of Corvallis on the Marys River near a place called Harris' Mill. Just as preparations were being made for a Final Spike ceremony to be attended by Governor Z. F. Moody and other political worthies from around the state, a massive snowstorm hit the region, putting a rare 24 inches of powder on the ground, which subsequently thawed and refroze, coating everything with a blanket of ice and disabling the engines.

Nearly 2,500 men remained stranded along the route, unable to be supplied with food by trail or rail. General Manager William M. Hoag, himself stranded along the line, managed to break through the ice and snow for a distance of nearly 20 miles to reach Corvallis, where relief efforts were organized. Sledges containing necessary supplies were hauled by men pulling on foot. A few days later, horse-drawn sleds were dispatched and the supply emergency came to an end.

It was with scant ceremony that the final spike was at last driven at 3 pm on December 31, 1884, by William Hoag.

The weather disaster led to false reports and rumors about failure of the project in the East, generating a cash flow crisis that made timely payment of railway workers for their last three months of work impossible. A near riot erupted and a strike was organized, culminating in April 1885 when in an act of sabotage the timbering of a tunnel was set on fire and burned out, effectively shutting down the railroad for months. An infusion of money into the company followed, creditors were paid off, and on July 4, 1885, the trains began running again.

=== Yaquina City ===
The WV&C Railroad's track came to an end several miles upriver from today's Newport at a hastily contrived terminus called "Yaquina City."

Instead of reaching Yaquina Bay at Newport, a new "city" was created several miles upriver called Yaquina City. Envisioned as a hub of trade, the small loading dock that served as the terminal point of the WV&C proved to be economically unsuccessful and quickly atrophied. The site of Yaquina City is now entirely abandoned, with few traces remaining.

=== Railroad today ===
The remaining stretch line constructed by the Willamette Valley and Coast Railroad, running between Corvallis and Toledo, is today part of the Portland and Western Railroad.

In 1909 the Oregon legislature repealed a law giving the WV&C title to the overflowed and tidal lands adjoining the Alsea River, Siletz River, and Yaquina Bay.

== See also ==
- Willamette Valley and Coast Railroad Depot
- Oregon Pacific Railroad (1880–94)
- Steamboats of Yaquina Bay and Yaquina River
- List of Oregon railroads
