= Joseph C. Avery =

American politician

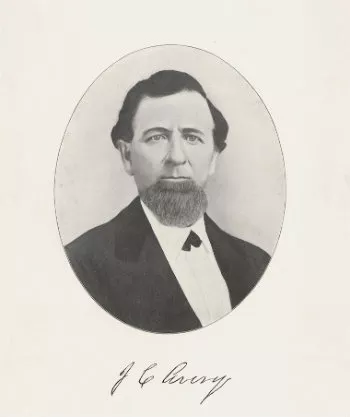
- Joseph C. Avery

Legislator in the Provisional Government of Oregon
- In office 1848–1849
- Succeeded by: Position dissolved
- Constituency: Benton District

Oregon Territory House of Representatives
- In office 1850–1852
- Constituency: Benton County

Personal details
- Born: Joseph Conant Avery; June 9, 1817 Tunkhannock, Pennsylvania
- Died: June 16, 1876 (aged 59) Oregon
- Spouse: Martha Marsh
- Occupation: Farmer, merchant, politician

Joseph Conant Avery (June 9, 1817 – June 16, 1876) was an early American pioneer and the founder of Corvallis, Oregon. Avery was the first postmaster for the community, and served as a legislator in the Provisional Government of Oregon and the government of the Oregon Territory. Avery House (formerly Avery Lodge) at Oregon State University was named after him.

== Early life ==
Avery was born in Tunkhannock, Pennsylvania on June 9, 1817. He was educated in Wilkes-Barre before moving to Illinois in 1839. Avery then married Martha Marsh in 1841 before they immigrated to Oregon Country in 1845.

== Oregon ==
After wintering at Oregon City, the family moved south the next year. Joseph Avery settled at the mouth of Marys River where it flows into the Willamette River in the central part of the Willamette Valley of what would become the state of Oregon. At that location he operated a ferry across the Willamette and established a farm. In 1848, Avery went to the gold fields of California and mined for a brief time before using his gold to purchase mercantile goods. Avery then returned to Oregon where he opened a store on his land claim where he then established a town site. He surveyed and platted the area and named it Marysville in 1850.

In 1848, Avery was elected and served in the final session of the Provisional Legislature of Oregon that began in December. He was elected to the Oregon Territorial Legislature in 1850 through 1852, serving as a Whig and representing Benton County. In 1853, Avery was appointed as a postal agent servicing both Washington and Oregon territories. In 1856, Avery returned to the Territorial Legislature as a Democrat. Joseph Avery, the father of 12 children, died on June 16, 1876. He was buried at the Masonic Cemetery in Corvallis.

== Naming controversy ==
After the demise of the Expositor newspaper at Eola in Polk County, Avery acquired the Expositor's equipment and provided Corvallis with its first printing press. He was later accused of using this press to operate the pro-slavery Occidental Messenger. Although surviving copies of the Occidental Messenger do not identify Avery as the paper's owner and do not indicate that he had control of the paper's editorial content, several contemporary sources identify Avery as the central force behind the Occidental Messenger's publication. Avery was a recognized member of the Whig party, initially, which did not actively support slavery. However, Corvallis and its surrounding cities were National Democratic Party strongholds in the mid-1800s and generally opposed abolition and, likely, the reason Avery later joined the party.

In the first half of the 1800s, most American newspapers regularly featured racist content and offered little to no journalistic balance. "There are a few examples, mostly in the North and West, of long-lived newspapers that, as far as I can tell, did not publish ads for slaves, including The New York Times. But even many of those papers championed racist violence in other ways, including defending the legality of slavery." A Smithsonian study of early American newspapers concluded, "Ninety-five percent of newspapers had explicit political affiliations. Many were bankrolled by the parties directly. There was no concept of journalistic independence and nonpartisanship until the turn of the 20th century." The thousands of American newspapers backed by the National Democratic Party regularly published pro-slavery propaganda - primarily during the two decades leading up to the Civil War. Republican-backed newspapers generally supported the abolition movement and Abraham Lincoln during the Civil War, which served as a slightly stronger counter-balance to pro-slavery publications in the North. Still, many Northern states and territories had a fairly even distribution of National Democratic- and Republican-backed papers, which created well-defined political lines between politically influential cities and regions.

Where slavery was never applied, party platforms such as the pro-slavery movement were mainly used as editorial "cannon fodder" for electoral control and eventual economic gain. Although there are exceptions, few residents of the Oregon Territory had the economic means to participate in slavery before the Civil War. "While many Oregon Trail emigrants were from slave-holding or border states, the great majority did not own slaves and did not belong to the slave-holding class." Instead, both parties attempted to ban African Americans from living in the territory to protect independent farms from the competition of industrial, slave farms.

Avery sold the paper in 1860, a year before the war, to Nathaniel Hart Lane. Lane was the son of Oregon's first governor and the namesake of Lane County. Nonetheless, papers like the Occidental Messenger played an instrumental role in sparking the American Civil War.

Avery's believed connection to pro-slavery propaganda, through his newspaper, led to an inquiry in 2017 by Oregon State University (OSU) about whether to retain the Avery name on a residence hall. OSU decided to rename the building.

== See also ==
- Bushrod Washington Wilson
