= Frank Conover =

American football player (born 1968)

No. 94
- Position: Defensive tackle

Personal information
- Born: April 6, 1968 (age 58); Manalapan Township, New Jersey, U.S.
- Listed height: 6 ft 5 in (1.96 m)
- Listed weight: 317 lb (144 kg)

Career information
- High school: Manalapan
- College: Syracuse
- NFL draft: 1991: 8th round, 197th overall pick

Career history
- Cleveland Browns (1991); Green Bay Packers (1992)*; Minnesota Vikings (1993)*
- * Offseason or practice squad member only

Career NFL statistics
- Sacks: 1
- Stats at Pro Football Reference

Frank Conover (born April 6, 1968) is an American former professional football player who was a defensive tackle in the National Football League (NFL). He played for the Cleveland Browns in 1991. He was selected by the Browns in the eighth round of the 1991 NFL draft after playing college football for the Syracuse Orange.
