= Oregon Pacific Railroad (1880–1894) =

Overview
- Headquarters: Corvallis, Oregon
- Reporting mark: OPR
- Locale: Oregon
- Dates of operation: 1880–1894
- Predecessor: Willamette Valley and Coast Railroad
- Successor: Oregon Central and Eastern Railroad

Technical
- Track gauge: 4 ft 8 1/2 in (1,435 mm)

- Oregon Pacific Railroad Linear Historic District
- U.S. National Register of Historic Places
- U.S. Historic district
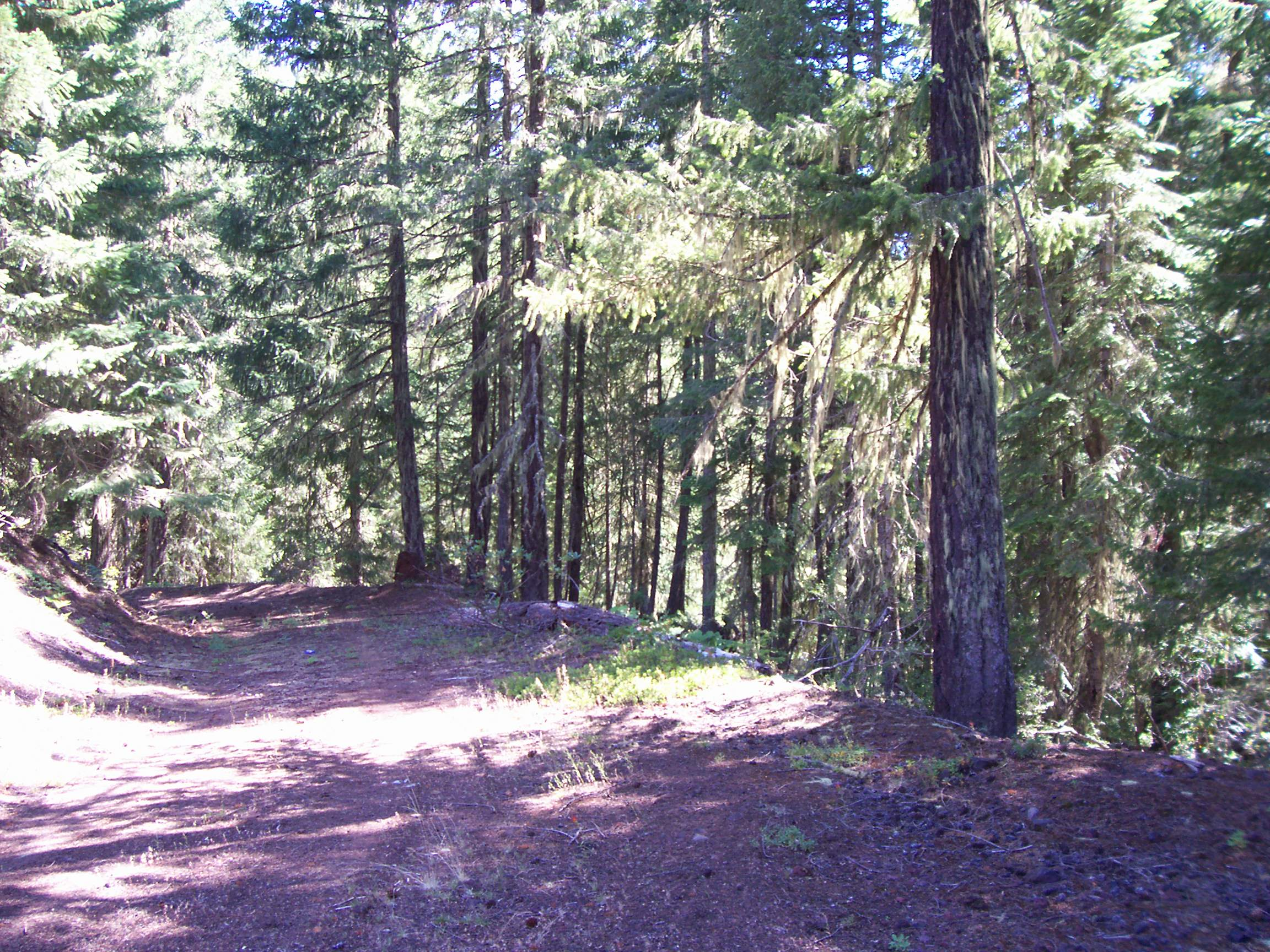

- Location within Oregon Location within the United States
- Nearest city: Santiam Junction, Oregon
- Coordinates: 44°27′10″N 121°53′57″W
- Area: 172.3 acres (69.7 ha)
- Built: 1887
- Built by: Colonel Eccelson
- NRHP reference No.: 99001285
- Added to NRHP: October 29, 1999

Oregon Pacific Railroad was a railroad in western Oregon, United States, from 1880 to 1894, when it was sold to the Oregon Central and Eastern Railroad. A substantial part of the Oregon Pacific's abandoned right-of-way is preserved as Oregon Pacific Railroad Linear Historic District.

It was created and owned by Thomas Egenton Hogg.

Hogg organized the Corvallis and Yaquina Bay Railroad in 1872, with the vision to build a new transcontinental line eastward from the Oregon coast and provide Corvallis with a railroad connection. At the time, the next nearest rails were the Oregon Central Railroad in St. Joseph, and the Oregon and California Railroad in Albany. Hogg reorganized the railroad as the Willamette Valley & Coast Railroad, and ground was first broken in Corvallis on May 17, 1877. The Oregon Pacific Railroad was organized on September 15, 1880, as a successor to the WV&C.

Hogg originally intended to terminate the line at Seal Rock on the Oregon Coast. In anticipation of the railroad's arrival, the town was platted in 1877 with pedestrian-friendly public spaces and resort hotels that would accommodate train travelers, but the line was instead routed through Toledo to end at Yaquina, resulting in financial ruin for many who invested in Seal Rock.

To the east, the line extended as far as Idanha, 15 miles (24 km) short of Santiam Pass before running out of money. Hogg purchased the steamship Yaquina City to provide a direct link to his railroad between Yaquina and San Francisco. Yaquina City successfully completed several voyages, until she ran aground at Yaquina Bay in 1887 due to a rudder failure. Despite the Yaquina City being insured, Hogg had just lost his biggest source of income and could not immediately replace the steamer. Hogg's contract with the government stated however, that if he could establish railroad service over the Cascade Mountains, he could receive a massive land grant. By selling this land, enough money could be made to keep the railroad in business. To get the grant, some additional track was laid over Santiam Pass. Hogg had mules pull some cars a few times to assert right of way. Hogg Rock near Santiam Pass is named for T. Egenton Hogg for his railroad which went around the rock. Track was also laid in the canyon of the Malheur River to reserve that pass for the railroad.

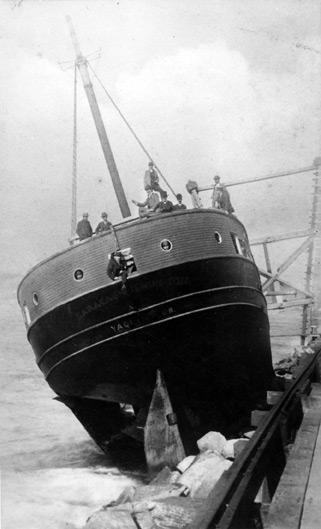
The wreck of the Yaquina Bay (ex-Caracas) aground on the south jetty of Yaquina Bay.

In 1888, Hogg purchased the Ocean liner Caracas from the Red D Line to replace the Yaquina City. She was renamed Yaquina Bay and towed to Yaquina. Before steamship service could restart however, Yaquina Bay broke free the tugboat which was hauling her on December 9, 1888, and ran aground near the wreck of the Yaquina City. Like the Yaquina City, the Yaquina Bay was declared a total loss.

The railroad entered bankruptcy in October 1890. In 1894 it was sold to A.B. Hammond and renamed the Oregon Central and Eastern Railway, and again in 1897 was reorganized as the Corvallis and Eastern Railroad. In 1907 the C&E was sold to the Southern Pacific.

Some of the tracks were submerged by Detroit Lake in the 1950s when the Detroit Dam was completed. In 1999, the line's corridor from Idanha to the Cascade summit was designated as a historic district and listed on the National Register of Historic Places.
