= National Register of Historic Places listings in Lincoln County, Oregon =

Location of Lincoln County in Oregon

This list presents the full set of buildings, structures, objects, sites, or districts designated on the National Register of Historic Places in Lincoln County, Oregon, United States, and offers brief descriptive information about each of them. The National Register recognizes places of national, state, or local historic significance across the United States. Out of over 90,000 National Register sites nationwide, Oregon is home to over 2,000, and 35 of those are found in Lincoln County.

This National Park Service list is complete through NPS recent listings posted July 31, 2026.

== Current listings ==
	Name on the Register	Image	Date listed	Location	City or town	Description
1	35-LNC-76-The Ahnkuti Site	35-LNC-76-The Ahnkuti Site	March 6, 2001 (#01000133)	Address restricted	Toledo	Oldest American Indian fish weir.
2	Archeological site 35LNC48		September 10, 1997 (#97001012)	Address restricted	Yachats	
3	Archeological site 35LNC63		September 10, 1997 (#97001013)	Address restricted	Yachats	
4	Archeological site 35LNC68		September 10, 1997 (#97001005)	Address restricted	Depoe Bay	
5	Archeological Site No. 35-LNC-54		June 21, 2006 (#03001182)	Address restricted	Yachats	
6	Archeological Site No. 35-LNC-55		June 21, 2006 (#03001183)	Address restricted	Yachats	
7	Archeological Site No. 35-LNC-56		June 21, 2006 (#03001184)	Address restricted	Yachats	
8	Archeological Site No. 35-LNC-57		June 21, 2006 (#03001185)	Address restricted	Yachats	
9	Boiler Bay Site (35LNC45)	Boiler Bay Site (35LNC45)	September 10, 1997 (#97001003)	Address restricted	Depoe Bay	
10	Cape Perpetua Shelter and Parapet	Cape Perpetua Shelter and Parapet	March 17, 1989 (#88002016)	3 miles (4.8 km) south of Yachats; 44°17′14″N 124°06′30″W	Yachats	
11	Chitwood Bridge	Chitwood Bridge	November 29, 1979 (#79002103)	Off U.S. Route 20; 44°39′08″N 123°48′58″W	Chitwood	
12	Depoe Bay Bridge No. 01388	Depoe Bay Bridge No. 01388	August 5, 2005 (#05000823)	U.S. Route 101 (Oregon Coastal Highway 9) at milepost O127.61; 44°48′36″N 124°03′39″W	Depoe Bay	
13	Depoe Bay Ocean Wayside	Depoe Bay Ocean Wayside	March 7, 2012 (#12000082)	119 SW US 101; 44°48′36″N 124°03′44″W	Depoe Bay	
14	Devil's Punch Bowl	Devil's Punch Bowl	September 10, 1997 (#97001006)	Oregon coastline at Otter Rock; 44°44′50″N 124°03′53″W	Otter Rock	
15	Dorchester House	Dorchester House	February 29, 1980 (#80003337)	2701 U.S. Route 101; 44°59′12″N 124°00′19″W	Lincoln City	
16	Fisher School Bridge	Fisher School Bridge	November 29, 1979 (#79002105)	Five Rivers Rd. 44°17′33″N 123°50′23″W	Fisher	
17	Government Point Site	Government Point Site	September 10, 1997 (#97001002)	Address restricted	Depoe Bay	
18	The Look-Out on Cape Foulweather	The Look-Out on Cape Foulweather	January 14, 2015 (#14001159)	4905 Otter Crest Loop; 44°45′38″N 124°04′00″W	Otter Rock vicinity	
19	New Cliff House	New Cliff House	November 6, 1986 (#86002962)	267 NW Cliff St. 44°38′18″N 124°03′44″W	Newport	
20	North 804 Midden (35LNC72)		September 10, 1997 (#97001008)	Address restricted	Yachats	
21	North Fork of the Yachats Bridge	North Fork of the Yachats Bridge	November 29, 1979 (#79002108)	Northeast of Yachats; 44°18′36″N 123°58′06″W	Yachats	
22	Old Yaquina Bay Lighthouse	Old Yaquina Bay Lighthouse	May 1, 1974 (#74001692)	Yaquina Bay State Park; 44°37′27″N 124°03′44″W	Newport	
23	Pacific Spruce Saw Mill Tenant Houses	Pacific Spruce Saw Mill Tenant Houses	May 20, 1999 (#99000602)	146, 162, 178, and 192 NE 6th St. 44°37′31″N 123°56′14″W	Toledo	
24	Rocky Creek Bridge No. 01089	Rocky Creek Bridge No. 01089	August 5, 2005 (#05000824)	Otter Crest Loop Rd., U.S. Route 101 frontage road, at milepost F130.00; 44°46′43″N 124°04′13″W	Otter Rock	
25	Rocky Creek Site (35LNC43)		September 10, 1997 (#97001004)	Address restricted	Depoe Bay	
26	Charles and Theresa Roper House	Charles and Theresa Roper House	December 9, 1981 (#81000500)	620 SW Alder St. 44°38′00″N 124°03′32″W	Newport	Designed to evoke a Scottish castle, this 1913 house a rare example of the Castellated Gothic Revival style in Oregon. Mayor and photographer Charles Roper left an important photographic record of Lincoln County in the 1910s and 1920s. Theresa Roper wrote and illustrated several books of romanticized history based on local lore and her collection of local Native American objects.
27	St. John's Episcopal Church	St. John's Episcopal Church	October 17, 1990 (#90001510)	110 NE Alder St. 44°37′14″N 123°56′08″W	Toledo	
28	Seal Rock	Seal Rock	September 10, 1997 (#97001007)	Address restricted	Seal Rock	
29	Siletz Agency Site	Siletz Agency Site	January 1, 1976 (#76001582)	Siletz–Logsden Rd. 44°43′23″N 123°54′38″W	Siletz	Beginning in 1855, U.S. Army forcibly relocated over 2,600 people of several different tribes to the Siletz Reservation. The government established an Indian agency at Siletz in 1857. Within 30 years, hardship had reduced the Indian numbers to approximately 600. By the time the agency closed in 1925, "Government Hill" had grown to include a blockhouse, boarding house, schoolhouse, barn, office building, employee residences, hospital/meeting house, and cemetery, several of which have since been destroyed. The site remains a focal point for members of the Siletz tribes.
30	Smelt Sands Midden (35LNC65)		September 10, 1997 (#97001011)	Address restricted	Yachats	
31	Trail 804 Midden #3 (35LNC73)		September 10, 1997 (#97001009)	Address restricted	Yachats	
32	U.S. Spruce Production Railroad XII, Spur 5	U.S. Spruce Production Railroad XII, Spur 5	June 8, 1989 (#88002032)	East of Yachats; 44°18′53″N 124°03′05″W	Yachats vicinity	
33	Yachats Trail 804 Midden (35LNC66)		September 10, 1997 (#97001010)	Address restricted	Yachats	
34	Yaquina Bay Bridge No. 01820	Yaquina Bay Bridge No. 01820	August 5, 2005 (#05000821)	U.S. Route 101 (Oregon Coastal Highway 9) at milepost P141.67; 44°37′23″N 124°03′21″W	Newport	
35	Yaquina Head Lighthouse	Yaquina Head Lighthouse	May 13, 1993 (#73002340)	Yaquina Head, about 4 miles (6.4 km) north of the entrance to the Yaquina River; 44°40′37″N 124°04′41″W	Newport	

== Former listings ==
	Name on the Register	Image	Date listed	Date removed	Location	City or town	Description
1	Drift Creek Bridge	Drift Creek Bridge	November 29, 1979 (#79002106)	July 21, 1998	SE of Lincoln City	Lincoln City vicinity	Original bridge dismantled in late 1997.
2	Elk City Bridge		November 29, 1979 (#79002104)	November 25, 1986	Cherry St.	Elk City	Destroyed by a storm in 1981.
3	Sam's Creek Bridge		November 29, 1979 (#79002107)	November 25, 1986	E of Siletz	Siletz vicinity	Demolished in 1980.
4	Tradewinds Kingfisher (cruiser)	Tradewinds Kingfisher (cruiser)	October 29, 1991 (#91001562)	October 15, 2014	Depoe Bay Boat Basin; 44°48′35″N 124°03′31″W	Depoe Bay	This vessel was demolished in December 5, 2013 due to an advanced state of deterioration. Parts of the vessel were saved for preservation and to exhibit at the Pacific Maritime & Heritage Center, Newport, Oregon.

== See also ==
- National Register of Historic Places listings in Oregon
- Listings in neighboring counties: Benton, Lane, Polk, Tillamook
- Historic preservation
- History of Oregon
- Lists of Oregon-related topics
