= Marys River (Oregon) =

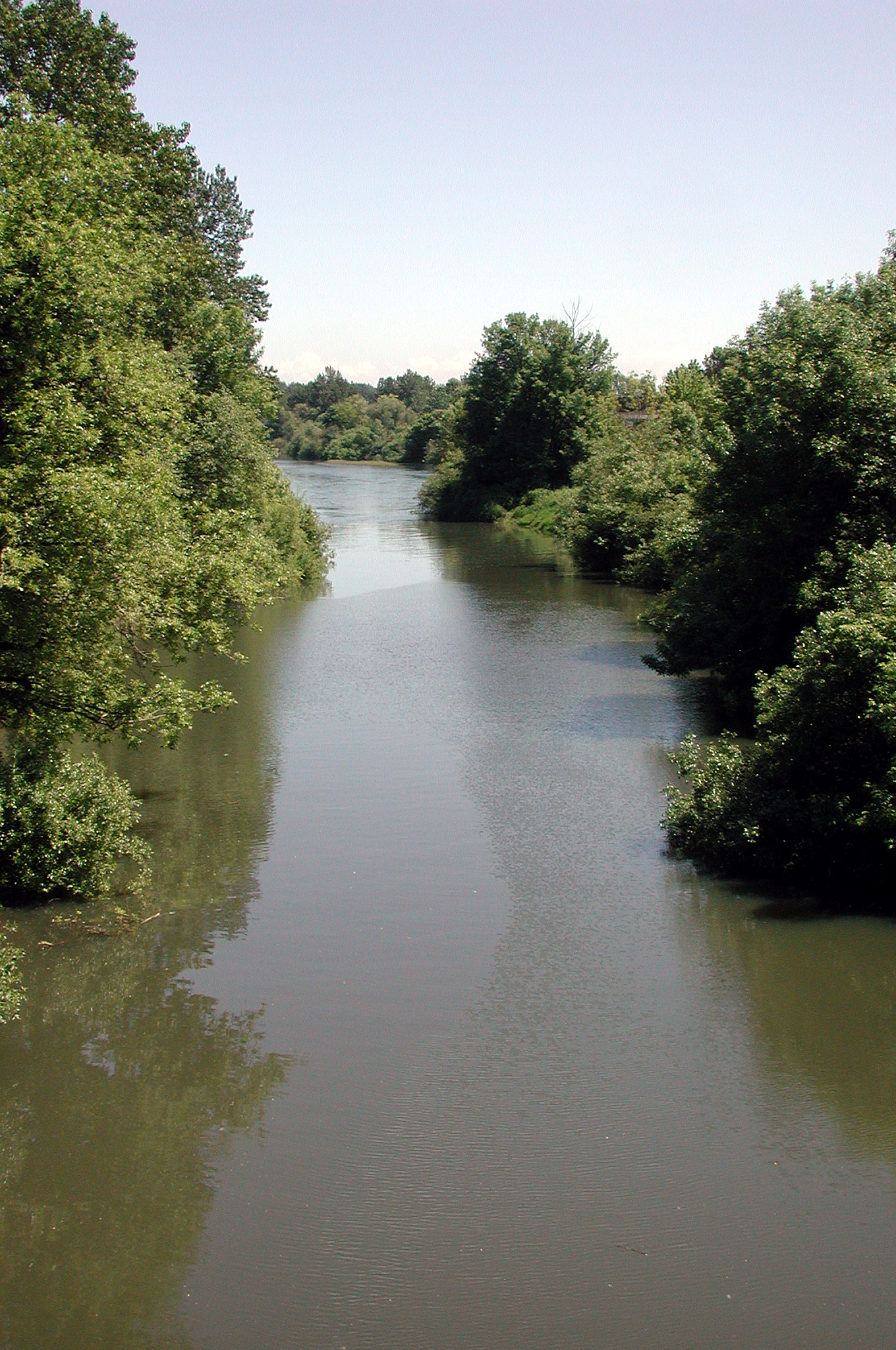
- Marys River near mouth in Corvallis

- Location of the mouth of Marys River in Oregon
- Etymology: Uncertain. For one of at least two women named Mary.

Location
- Country: United States
- State: Oregon
- County: Benton

Physical characteristics
- Source: Confluence of East Fork Marys River and West Fork Marys River
  - location: near Summit, Benton County, Oregon
  - coordinates: 44°39′24″N 123°33′39″W
  - elevation: 659 ft (201 m)
- Mouth: Willamette River
  - location: Corvallis, Benton County, Oregon
  - coordinates: 44°33′20″N 123°15′41″W
  - elevation: 207 ft (63 m)
- Length: 40 mi (64 km)
- Basin size: 310 sq mi (800 km^{2})
- Discharge
  - location: 2 miles (3.2 km) southeast of Philomath, 9.4 miles (15.1 km) from the mouth
  - average: 448 cu ft/s (12.7 m^{3}/s)
  - minimum: 0.60 cu ft/s (0.017 m^{3}/s)
  - maximum: 13,600 cu ft/s (390 m^{3}/s)

Marys River is a 40-mile (64 km) tributary of the Willamette River in the U.S. state of Oregon. From its source at the confluence of its east and west forks near Summit, it flows generally southeast from the Central Oregon Coast Range to Corvallis.

== Name ==
The origin of the name is uncertain, although it was used as early as 1846. Lewis A. and Lewis L. McArthur, in the seventh edition of Oregon Geographic Names find no support for the suggestion that employees of the Hudson's Bay Company had earlier named the stream St. Marys River. Rather, they summarize two stories about the origin. One is that Adam E. Wimple, an early settler, named the stream for his sister. Wimple was hanged at Dallas, Oregon, in 1852 for murdering his wife, also named Mary. The other story is that Wayman St. Clair, who represented Benton County in the territorial legislature in the early 1850s, named the river for Mary Lloyd. She was said to have been the first white woman to cross the river.

In 1847, Joseph C. Avery began laying out a town at the confluence of Marys River with the Willamette River, and the place was called Marysville. In 1853, the legislature changed the name of the town to Corvallis, a compounding of Latin words meaning heart of the valley. Prior to settlement by European Americans, fur traders referred to the Mary's River as Mouse River or Mice River. It is probable that nearby Marys Peak was named for the river.

== Course ==
Marys River arises in western Benton County at 659 feet (201 m) above sea level and falls 452 feet (138 m) between source and mouth to an elevation of 207 feet (63 m). The main stem, formed by the confluence of the East Fork Marys River and the West Fork Marys River, begins at about river mile 40 (RM 40) or river kilometer 64 (RK 64) north of Marys Peak in the Central Oregon Coast Range. The West Fork Marys River, which is 6 miles (9.7 km) long, rises at 44.733333°N 123.570833°W and flows south to join the East Fork. The East Fork, which is 5 miles (8.0 km) long, rises at 44.7°N 123.5152778°W and flows southwest to join the West Fork. Marys Peak rises to 4,022 feet (1,226 m) above sea level at 44.5042870°N 123.5512165°W.

From its source, the river flows south along the east side of Marys River Road, past the unincorporated community of Summit and under Oregon Route 180 at about 38 miles (61 km) from the mouth. Turning southeast, the river flows just south of Route 180, receiving Devitt Creek from the left before reaching the unincorporated community of Blodgett. Here, about 32 miles (51 km) from the mouth, it crosses under U.S. Route 20 and in quick succession receives Norton Creek from the left and the Tumtum River from the right. Turning south and then east, it passes the unincorporated community of Harris at about RM 26.5 (RK 42.6) before reaching the unincorporated community of Wren. Near Wren, it turns north, crosses under Route 20 again, turns east, receives Gellatly Creek and La Bare Creek, both from the left, and passes under Oregon Route 223 at about 22 miles (35 km) from the mouth.

Just east of Route 223, the river receives Read Creek from the left, then Blakesley Creek from the left at about RM 20 (RK 32) and soon turns sharply south. About 14.5 miles (23.3 km) from the mouth, it flows under Route 20 for the third time, immediately receives Woods Creek from the right and turns southeast. It soon passes under Oregon Route 34 where it receives Greasy Creek from the right. Marys River then flows southeast by Philomath, which lies to its left (north), receives Newton Creek from the left, and passes a United States Geological Survey (USGS) stream gauge at 9.4 miles (15.1 km) from the mouth. At about 5.5 miles (8.9 km) from the mouth, the river receives Muddy Creek from the right and turns northeast toward Corvallis. In Corvallis, it passes Marysville Golf Course and Mill Race on the right, receives Dunawi Creek and Oak Creek from the left, and passes Avery Park on the right about 1 mile (1.6 km) from the mouth. Shortly thereafter, it flows under Oregon Route 99W and enters the Willamette River near the larger river's RM 132 (RK 212).

== See also ==
- List of rivers of Oregon

== Works cited ==
- McArthur, Lewis A., and McArthur, Lewis L. (2003) [1928]. Oregon Geographic Names, 7th ed. Portland: Oregon Historical Society Press. ISBN 0-87595-277-1.
