= Cline Hill Summit (Lincoln County, Oregon) =

Mountain pass in Oregon, United States

- Interactive map of Cline Hill Summit
- Elevation: 770 ft (230 m)
- Traversed by: US 20

Location
- Location: Lincoln County, Oregon, United States
- Coordinates: 44°37′11″N 123°38′39″W

Cline Hill Summit is an Oregon mountain pass, over the Coast Range. It has also been classed as a gap, and, is in Lincoln County.

Cline Hill has an elevation of 770 feet (230 m). It is traversed by US Route 20.

== In the area of Cline Hill ==
The following cities are nearby:

- Summit 4.1 miles (6.6 km)
- Blodgett 6.7 miles (10.8 km)
- Kings Valley 12.6 miles (20.3 km)
- Toledo 14 miles (23 km)
- Philomath 15 miles (24 km)
- Siletz 15.1 miles (24.3 km)
- Alsea 16.2 miles (26.1 km)
- Corvallis 19.6 miles (31.5 km)
- Newport 19.7 miles (31.7 km)
