= Dawson, Oregon =

Unincorporated community in the state of Oregon, United States

Coordinates: 44.360677°N 123.411767°W

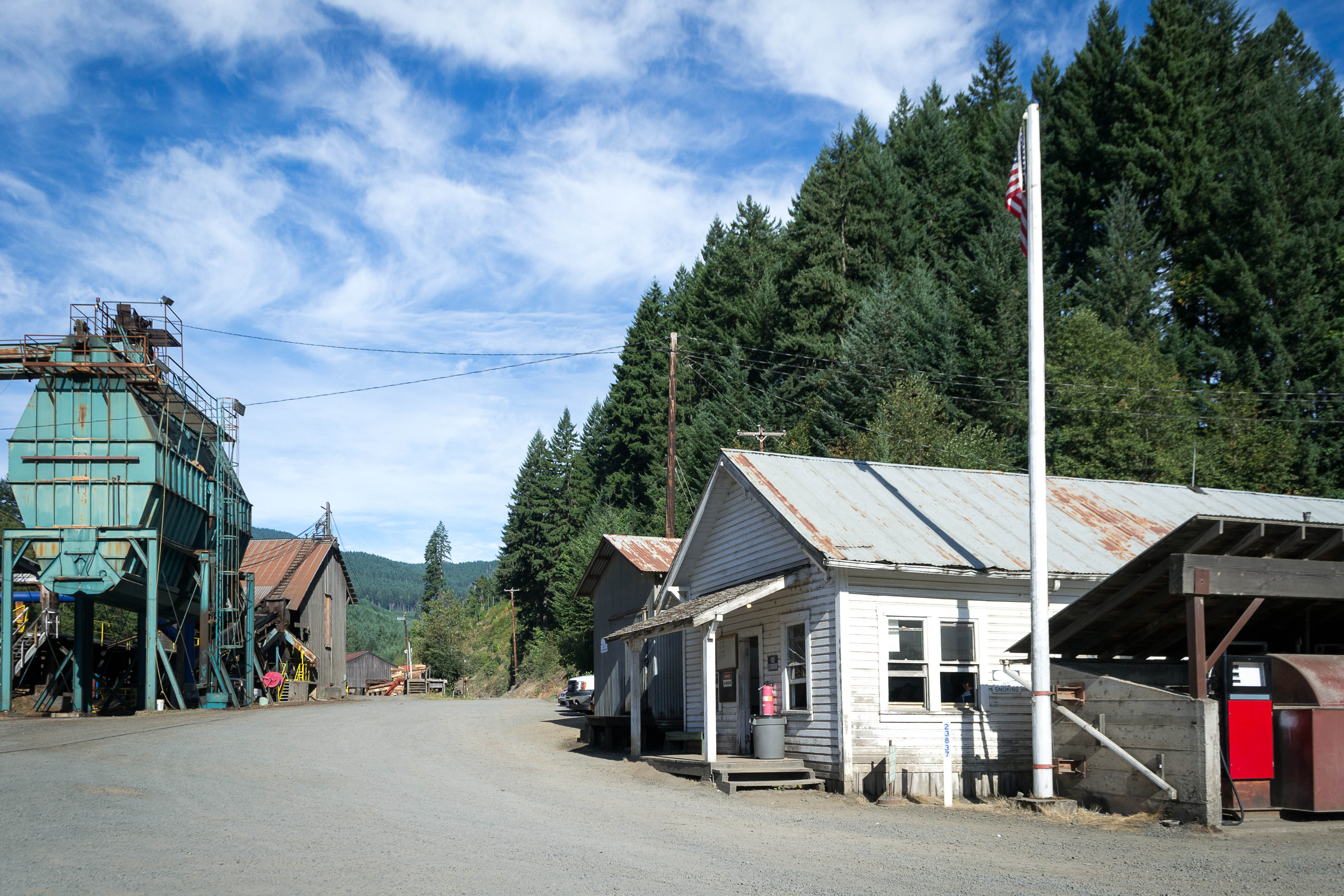
The Hull-Oakes Lumber Company offices in Dawson, Oregon

Dawson is an unincorporated community in Benton County, Oregon, United States. Dawson lies about 6 miles west of 99W on Dawson Road west of Bellfountain, northwest of Alpine, and north of Glenbrook. Dawson was the terminus of the Southern Pacific Bailey Branch (later operated by the Willamette & Pacific Railroad), which served the local sawmill into the 1990s but has since been abandoned.

The Hull-Oakes Lumber Company sawmill in Dawson was the last steam-powered sawmill in the United States, and the only mill in the Pacific Northwest capable of cutting logs more than 70 feet in length.
