= Little Yaquina River =

- Location of the mouth of the Little Yaquina River in Oregon

Location
- Country: United States
- State: Oregon
- County: Benton, Lincoln

Physical characteristics
- Source: Central Oregon Coast Range
  - location: Benton County
  - coordinates: 44°42′12″N 123°36′07″W
  - elevation: 1,240 ft (380 m)
- Mouth: Yaquina River
  - location: upstream of Nashville, Lincoln County
  - coordinates: 44°40′47″N 123°36′29″W
  - elevation: 289 ft (88 m)

The Little Yaquina River is a minor tributary of the Yaquina River in Benton and Lincoln counties in the U.S. state of Oregon. It begins in the Central Oregon Coast Range on the eastern side of the border between the two counties but crosses immediately west into Lincoln County through which it flows generally south to meet the main stem near Hamar Lake, north of Nashville. The Little Yaquina has one named tributary, Cedar Creek, which enters from the right.

Hamar Lake, along the Little Yaquina, covers 4.3 acres (1.7 ha) and has a shoreline of about 0.4 miles (0.6 km).

== See also ==
- List of rivers of Oregon
