= Roper House =

Roper House may refer to:

- Charles and Theresa Roper House, Newport, Oregon
- Roper House Complex, Pickens County, South Carolina
- Robert William Roper House, Charleston, South Carolina
