= Chitwood Bridge =

Covered bridge in Oregon, United States

- U.S. National Register of Historic Places
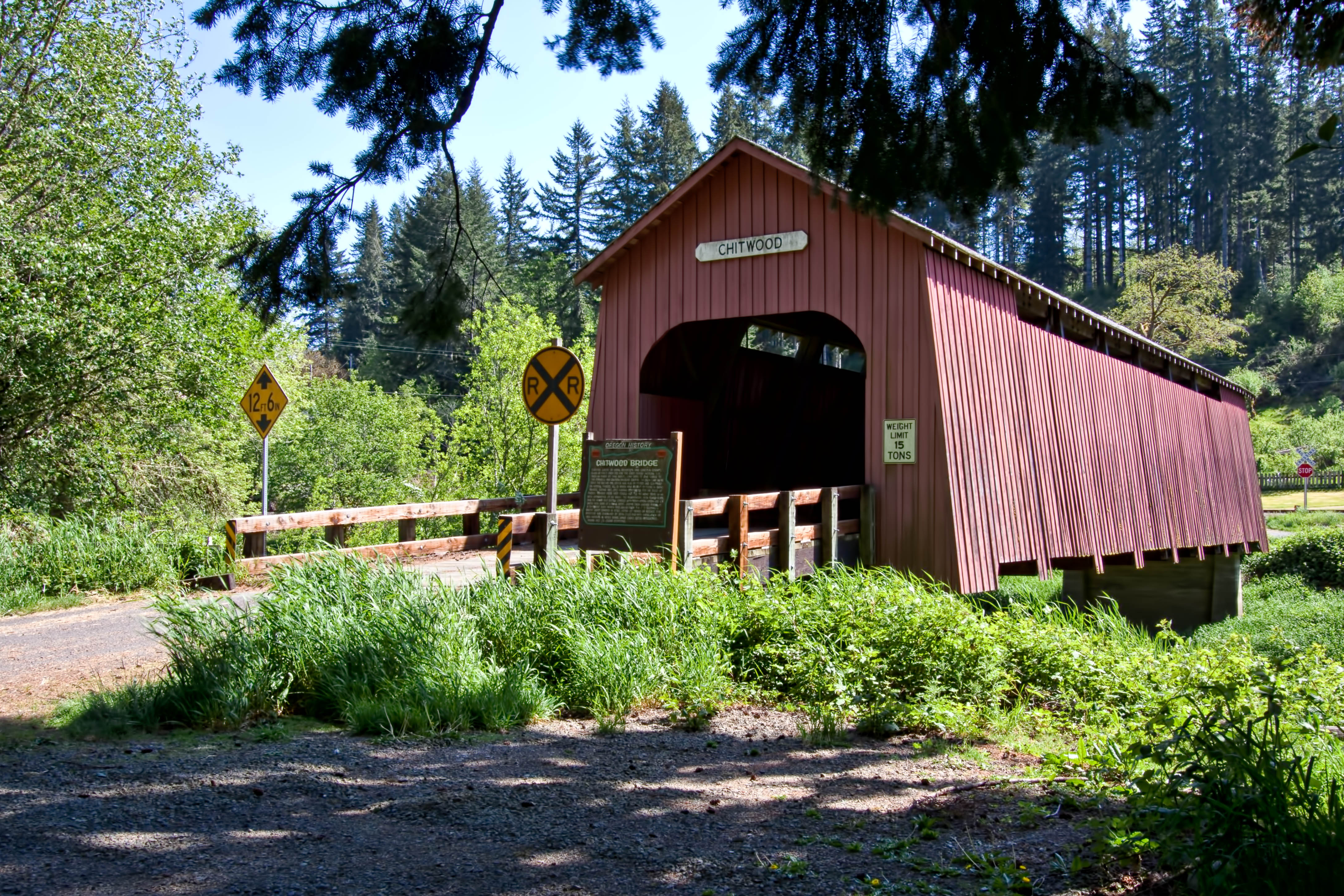
- Chitwood Bridge over the Yaquina River

- Location within Oregon Location within the United States
- Nearest city: Toledo
- Coordinates: 44°39′15.2″N 123°49′03.9″W
- Built: 1926
- Architectural style: Howe truss
- MPS: Oregon Covered Bridges TR
- NRHP reference No.: 79002103
- Listed: November 29, 1979

The Chitwood Bridge is a covered bridge in Lincoln County in the U.S. state of Oregon. The bridge carries Chitwood Road, off U.S. Route 20, over the Yaquina River at Chitwood. The structure was added to the National Register of Historic Places in 1979.

Historically, Chitwood was a station on the railway line between Corvallis and Toledo. It was named for Joshua Chitwood, who lived nearby during construction of the railway, 1881–1885. Trains still use the railway, but they no longer stop in Chitwood.

Lincoln County built the covered bridge in 1926. Scheduled for demolition, it was instead improved in 1984 through a federally funded restoration project. The Howe truss bridge is 96 feet (29 m) long.

== See also ==
- List of bridges on the National Register of Historic Places in Oregon
- List of covered bridges in Oregon
