= Yaquina River =

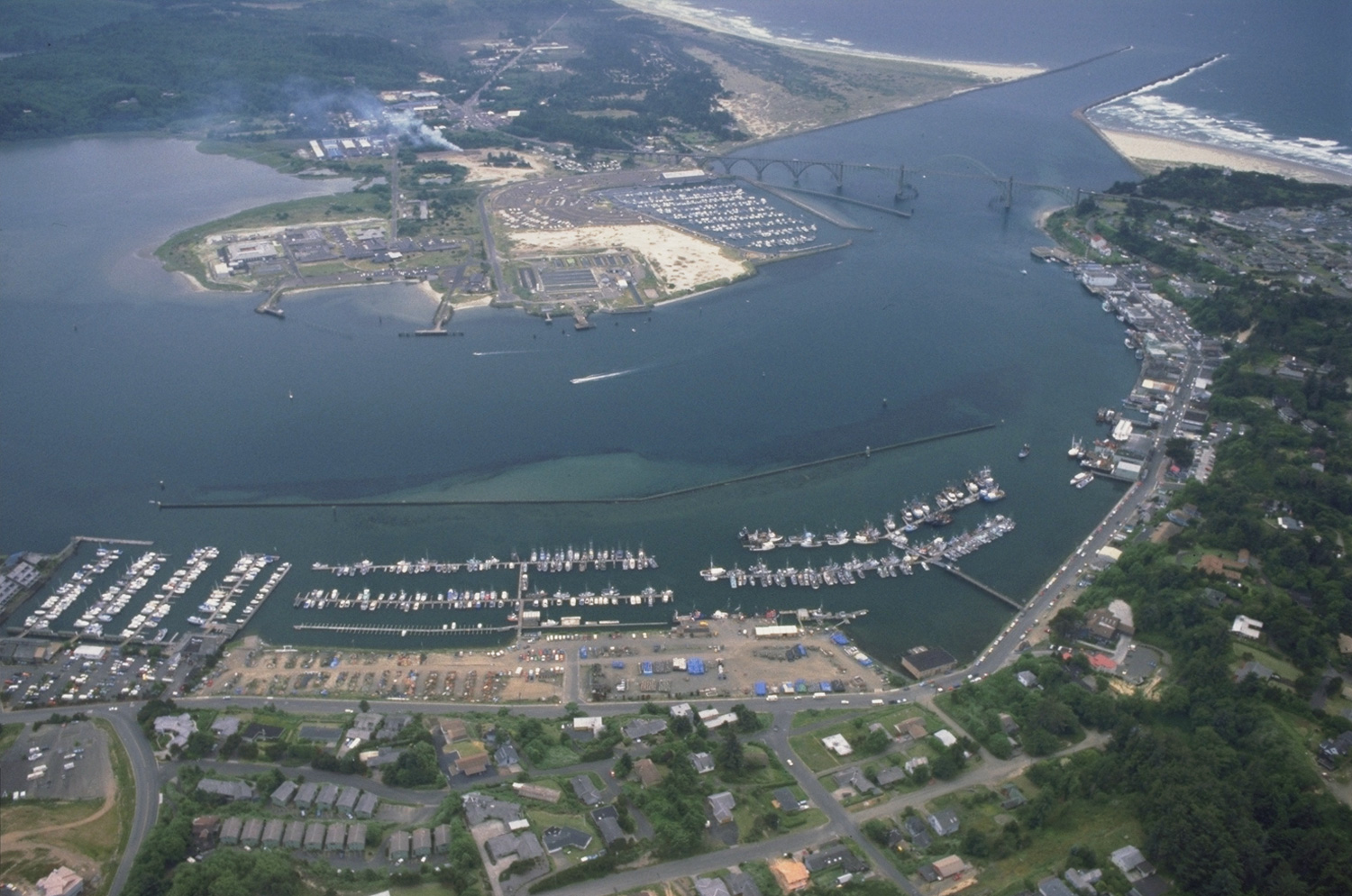
- Yaquina Bay, where the Yaquina River meets the Pacific Ocean

- Location of the mouth of the Yaquina River in Oregon

Location
- Country: United States
- State: Oregon
- County: Benton and Lincoln

Physical characteristics
- Source
  - location: near Summit, Benton County, Central Oregon Coast Range
  - coordinates: 44°44′57″N 123°36′06″W
- Mouth: Yaquina Bay
  - location: Newport, Lincoln County
  - coordinates: 44°36′44″N 124°01′04″W
  - elevation: 3 ft (0.91 m)
- Length: 59 mi (95 km)
- Basin size: 252 sq mi (650 km^{2})
- Discharge
  - average: 248 cu ft/s (7.0 m^{3}/s)

The Yaquina River (/jəˈkwɪnə/ yə-KWIN-ə) is a stream, 59 miles (95 km) long, on the Pacific coast of the U.S. state of Oregon. It drains an area of the Central Oregon Coast Range west of the Willamette Valley near Newport.

It rises in the mountains west of Corvallis along the county line between Benton and Lincoln counties. It flows south, then generally west, in a highly serpentine course, past Eddyville, Chitwood, Toledo, and Elk City, and enters the Pacific in Yaquina Bay, a broad estuary at Newport. When sea level was lower than today, the Yaquina River reached to Stonewall Bank, which is split by a rocky channel.

U.S. Route 20, the Corvallis–Newport highway, follows the river from Eddyville, at the confluence of the river with Little Elk Creek, to slightly downstream of Chitwood. Near the mouth of Yaquina Bay, the river passes under Yaquina Bay Bridge, which carries U.S. Route 101. Other bridges over the river include the Chitwood Covered Bridge at Chitwood.

The National Oceanic and Atmospheric Administration's Pacific Marine Center and the Hatfield Marine Science Center are both along Yaquina Bay. Adjacent to the Hatfield Center is the Oregon Coast Aquarium. The Yaquina Bay Lighthouse, contained within the Yaquina Bay State Recreation Site, is on the coast near the mouth of the river.

== Fishing ==
A large charter fishing fleet operates out of Newport in search of halibut, salmon, and other fish found in the nearby ocean. Species within the bay include cabezon, striped perch, rockfish, greenling, salmon, sturgeon, herring, and crabs. The river upstream of the bay supports populations of salmon, steelhead, and cutthroat trout. The river and bay are also fished from the banks in places and from small boats. Boat-launching ramps are available along the lower river and the bay.

== Tributaries ==
Named tributaries of the Yaquina River from source to mouth begin with Bailey Creek and the Little Yaquina River followed by Splide, Humphrey, Young, Felton, Davis, Randall, Stony, Bryant, and Buttermilk creeks. Then come Bales, Trout, Little Elk, Eddy, Peterson, Hayes, Whitney, Crystal, Cougar, and Thornton creeks.

Then Trapp, Simpson, Sloop, Martin, Bear, Little Carlisle, Carlisle, Big Elk, Blair, Abbey, and Mill creeks. Along the lower reaches of the river are Olalla and Depot sloughs; Babcock and Montgomery creeks, and Nute, Boone, Blind, Flesher, Johnson, Poole, McCaffery, Parker, King, and Sallys sloughs.

== See also ==
- List of rivers of Oregon
- List of longest streams of Oregon
- Yaquina Head
