= Oregon Highway 54 =

Oregon Highway 54 may refer to:

- For the former OR 54, see Oregon Route 54.
- For the unsigned Highway 54, see Umatilla-Stanfield Highway.
- For the former unsigned Highway 54, see Boardman-Stanfield Highway.
