= Burnt Woods, Oregon =

Unincorporated community in Oregon, United States

Coordinates: 44.603731°N 123.622885°W

Burnt Woods is an unincorporated community in Lincoln County, Oregon, United States. It is located about 16 miles (26 km) west of Philomath on U.S. Route 20 in the Central Oregon Coast Range near the Tumtum River.

Burnt Woods post office was established in 1919, after the name was chosen from a list of proposed names sent to the Post Office Department. The signs of past forest fires are still evident in the area. Burnt Woods post office closed in 1978.

The community has a store and a café. The store has been operating since the early 1920s. The café was opened in 1925 and has had several owners since then.

Ellmaker State Wayside is located about 1 mile (1.6 km) north of Burnt Woods, accessed westbound on U.S. Route 20.
