= Glenbrook, Oregon =

Unincorporated community in the state of Oregon, United States

Glenbrook
- Unincorporated community
- Location in Oregon
- Coordinates: 44°18′49″N 123°24′23″W
- Country: United States
- State: Oregon
- County: Benton County
- Founded: 1919
- Time zone: UTC-8 (Pacific)

Glenbrook is an unincorporated community and former logging town in Benton County, Oregon, United States. Glenbrook lies on Alpine Road west of Alpine and south of Dawson.

A sawmill operated by the Alsea River Lumber Company was established at Glenbrook in 1919, and a logging railroad into the surrounding forest was constructed at this time. The town itself was built around the sawmill, and was "christened" with a large parade and barbecue in late August 1920. As of 2024, little remains of Glenbrook apart from the mill pond.
