= Hyslop Field Research Laboratory =

Coordinates: 44.6327°N 123.19336°W

The Hyslop Field Research Laboratory is an agricultural research facility operated by the Oregon State University Crop and Soil Science Department. Also known as The Hyslop Farm, it is located on Highway 20 about halfway between Corvallis and Albany, Oregon.

== History ==
The Hyslop farm was named after George Hyslop, who was hired by Agronomy Department founder Henry Scudder when he opened the department in 1907. The two of them originally taught all 14 courses. In 1916, the Agronomy Department was divided into 4 departments, including Farm Crops with George Hyslop as its head.

In 1929, the land was purchased that became the Hyslop Agronomy Farm.

George Hyslop died suddenly in 1943 at age 58.
