= Ellmaker State Wayside =

State park in Oregon, United States

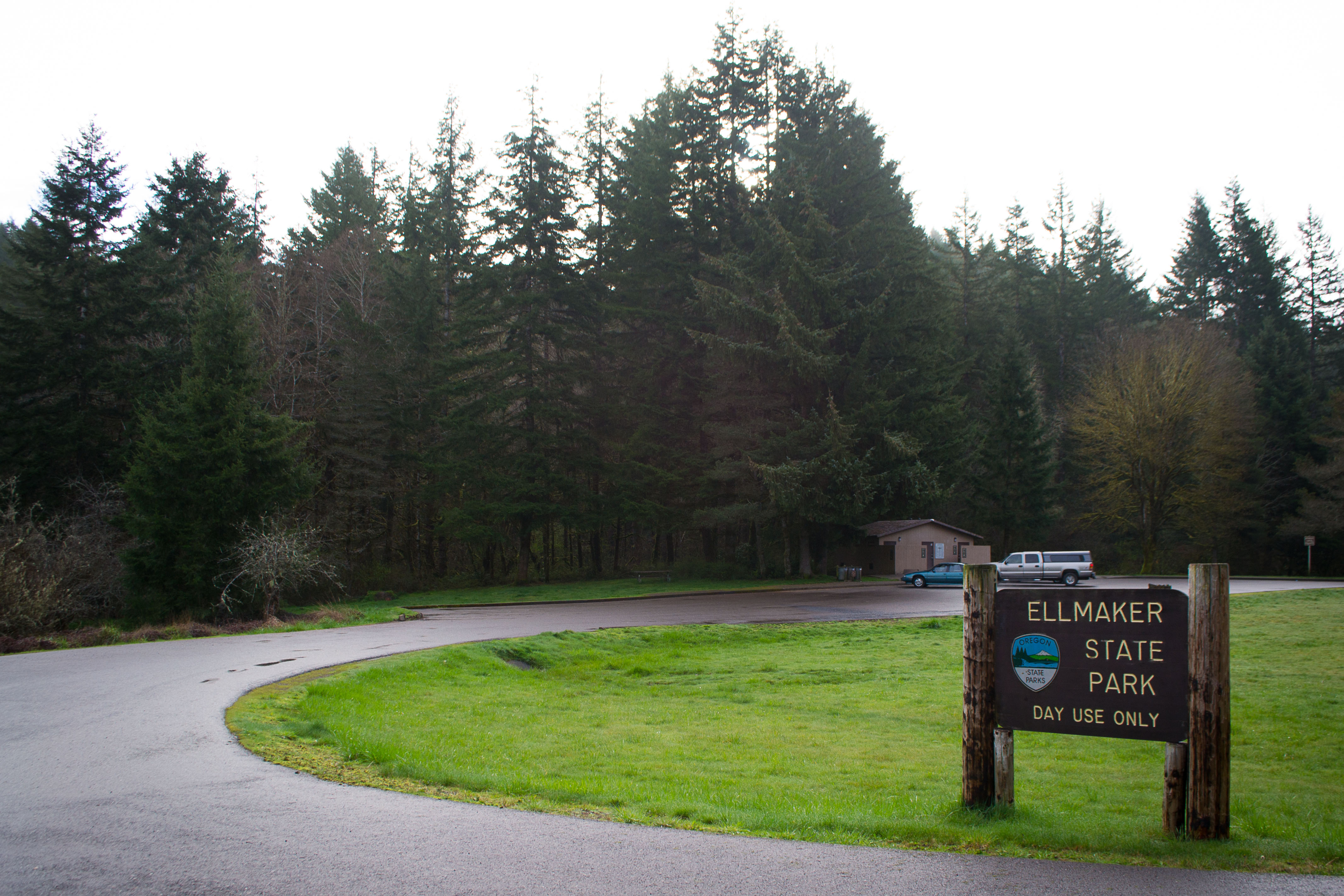

- Location within Oregon Location within the United States
- Type: Public, state
- Location: Lincoln County, Oregon
- Nearest city: Corvallis
- Coordinates: 44°36′52″N 123°37′54″W
- Operator: Oregon Parks and Recreation Department

Ellmaker State Wayside is a state park in the U.S. state of Oregon, administered by the Oregon Parks and Recreation Department. It is located on U.S. Route 20 approximately 1 mile (1.6 km) north of the community of Burnt Woods.

== History ==
The land for this park was donated to the State of Oregon in 1961 by the property's owner, Harlan D. Ellmaker (1881-1978), a retired employee of the United States Forest Service. Born in Oregon in 1881, Ellmaker was a grand nephew of a member of the prominent Ellmaker family, a number of whom had relocated from Lancaster County, Pennsylvania to Lane County, Oregon during the mid-1800s. Ellmaker resided on the property before donating it to the federal government.

Ellmaker donated eighty acres of timber and grassland, telling newspaper reporters, "I am pleased to make this contribution of land to the people for state park use and in memory of the Ellmakers who pioneered in Pennsylvania, Illinois, Iowa, Missouri, California and Oregon." Ellmaker added, "I decided the state can do more with it than I can to save our fading wilderness, and maybe rescue men from the maudlin mercenary way of modern life."

As he accepted the donation from Ellmaker, park superintendent Mark H. Astrup noted that the eighty-acre parcel included "two beaver-dammed streams, a level area for camping or playground and easy access from the highway."

Ellmaker's property became "the first state park on Route 20 between Corvallis and Newport," according to the Gazette-Times of Corvallis. "Two streams flow together on it to form Tum Tum Creek, a tributary of the St. Marys River."

== Park features and amenities ==
Ellmaker State Wayside is open for day use throughout the year, and frequently serves as a rest stop for travelers. A tree preserve, fruit trees are located on the park's south side. A small picnic area is located near a meadow, and a small stream runs from the northeast. Public restrooms are also available.

== See also ==
- List of Oregon state parks
