= Tumtum River =

- Location of the mouth of the Tumtum River in Oregon
- Etymology: Chinook Jargon word for "heart", referring to the heart of the valley through which the river flows

Location
- Country: United States
- State: Oregon
- Counties: Lincoln, Benton

Physical characteristics
- Source: Central Oregon Coast Range
  - location: near Burnt Woods, Lincoln County
  - coordinates: 44°35′52″N 123°39′04″W
  - elevation: 1,018 ft (310 m)
- Mouth: Marys River (Oregon)
  - location: near Alder, Benton County
  - coordinates: 44°35′18″N 123°30′43″W
  - elevation: 584 ft (178 m)
- Length: 9 mi (14 km)
- Basin size: 19.1 sq mi (49 km^{2})

The Tumtum River is a 9-mile (14 km) tributary of the Marys River in Benton and Lincoln counties in the U.S. state of Oregon. The river rises in the Central Oregon Coast Range west of Burnt Woods and passes through the communities of Burnt Woods and Blodgett. It then drains into the Marys River north of Alder.

The name Tumtum is a Chinook Jargon word for "heart", and the river was so-named because it was considered to be the heart of the valley through which it flowed. When the Burnt Woods post office was to be named, one of the names proposed to the Post Office Department was Tumtum.
