= Oregon Route 180 =

State highway in western Oregon, US

Oregon Route 180
- Route 180 highlighted in red

Route information
- Maintained by ODOT
- Length: 19.23 mi (30.95 km)
- Existed: 2002–present

Major junctions
- West end: Crystal Creek Loop in Eddyville
- East end: US 20 in Blodgett

Location
- Country: United States
- State: Oregon
- Counties: Benton, Lincoln

Highway system
- Oregon Highways; Interstate; US; State; Named; Scenic
← OR 173	→ OR 182

Oregon Route 180 is an Oregon state highway running from the community of Eddyville to U.S. Route 20 in Blodgett. OR 180 is known as the Eddyville-Blodgett Highway No. 180 (see Oregon highways and routes). It is 19.23 miles (30.95 km) long and runs west–east.

OR 180 was established in 2002 as part of Oregon's project to assign route numbers to highways that previously were not assigned, and, as of September 2019, was unsigned.

== Route description ==
OR 180 begins at an intersection with Crystal Creek Loop (formerly US 20) in Eddyville. It heads east through Nortons, Nashville, and Summit to an intersection with US 20 in Blodgett, where it ends.

== History ==
OR 180 was assigned to the undesignated part of the Eddyville-Blodgett Highway in 2002.

== Major intersections ==
County	Location	mi	km	Destinations	Notes
Lincoln	Eddyville	0.00	0.00	Crystal Creek Loop	
Benton	Blodgett	19.25	30.98	US 20	
1.000 mi = 1.609 km; 1.000 km = 0.621 mi

== Related routes ==
- U.S. Route 20
