= Vale–West Highway =

State highway in Malheur County, Oregon, US

Vale–West Highway No. 451
- Oregon Route 451
- Route 451 highlighted in red

Route information
- Maintained by ODOT
- Length: 10.39 mi (16.72 km)
- Existed: November 13, 1931–present

Major junctions
- West end: US 20 near Vale
- East end: US 20 in Vale

Location
- Country: United States
- State: Oregon
- County: Malheur

Highway system
- Oregon Highways; Interstate; US; State; Named; Scenic
← OR 429	→ OR 452

The Vale–West Highway No. 451 is an Oregon state highway in Malheur County. It runs east–west for approximately ten miles (16 km) between two intersections with U.S. Route 20 (US 20) west of Vale and in the city. Highway 451 is also designated as Oregon Route 451 (OR 451).

The OR 451 designation was established in 2003 as part of Oregon's project to assign route numbers to existing named highways that previously were not assigned. As of July 2018, OR 451 is unsigned.

== Route description ==
Highway 451 begins at a junction with US 20 at its crossing of the Malheur River southwest of Vale. The highway travels northwest on Canyon Road, briefly turning west and then north again, to reach Graham Boulevard. Highway 451 then turns east and continues into Vale, where it terminates at another junction with US 20.

== History ==
The Vale–West Highway was designated as a state highway on November 13, 1931. OR 451 was assigned to the Vale–West Highway in 2003.

== Major intersections ==
The entire route is in Malheur County.

Location	mi	km	Destinations	Notes
	0.00	0.00	US 20 – Vale, Juntura	
Vale	10.39	16.72	US 20 – Vale, Ontario, Juntura, Burns	
1.000 mi = 1.609 km; 1.000 km = 0.621 mi
