= Elk City, Oregon =

Unincorporated community in Oregon, United States

- Unincorporated community
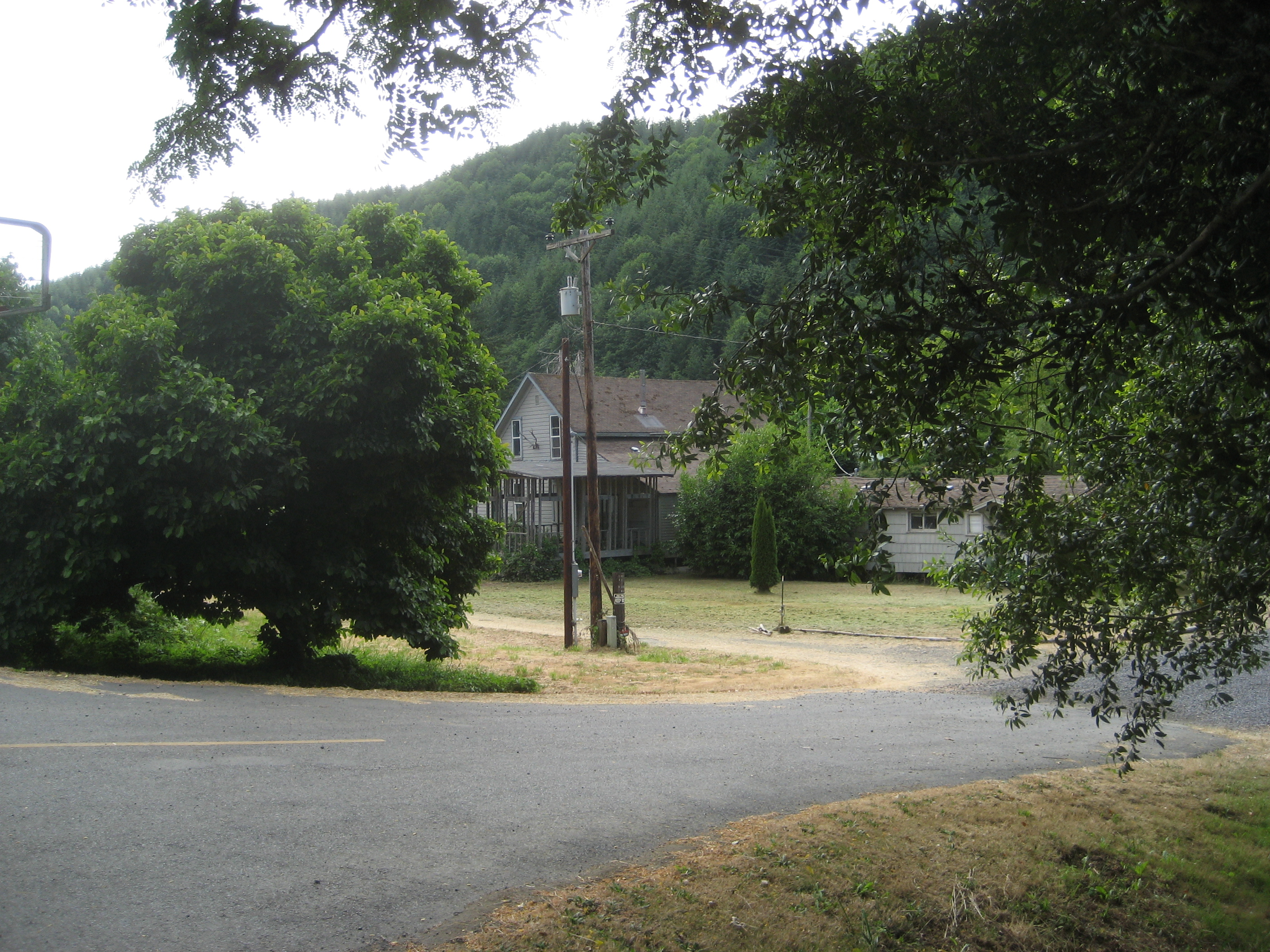
- Elk City scene in 2008

- Location within Oregon Location within the United States
- Coordinates: 44°37′10″N 123°52′46″W
- Country: United States
- State: Oregon
- County: Lincoln
- Named for: Big Elk Creek
- Elevation: 371 ft (113 m)
- Time zone: UTC-8 (PST)
  - Summer (DST): UTC-7 (PDT)
- ZIP codes: 97391
- Area code: 541
- Coordinates and elevation from United States Geological Survey

Elk City is an unincorporated city in Lincoln County, in the U.S. state of Oregon. Lying along the Yaquina River east of Newport, it is on Elk City Road off U.S. Route 20 at Toledo. Elk City lies at the confluence of Big Elk Creek with the river, about 23 miles (37 km) upstream from the Yaquina river mouth. Ocean tides affect the water levels this far upriver.

== Name ==
Named for the creek, Elk City was "said to have been the first settlement in what is now 'Lincoln County'." A post office was established at this location, then called Newton, in 1868. In 1888, the name was changed from Newton to Elk City. The Elk City post office closed in 1958.

== History ==
The Corvallis and Yaquina Wagon Road Company established Elk City in 1866 by building a warehouse with a store and by laying out a town. A year later, Elk City had a second store, a hotel, and a structure doubling as a church and schoolhouse. Boats regularly ascended the river to Elk City, the last stop on the overland mail route of the time, and delivered mail downriver by water.

In the late 19th century, Elk City was one of the stops on the Oregon Pacific Railroad, linking the former port city of Yaquina to Corvallis and Albany. After the Oregon Pacific failed financially, fell into receivership, and went through 17 years of financial and legal complications, it became a branch line of the Southern Pacific in 1907.

In 1922, the county constructed a 100-foot (30 m) Howe truss span over the Yaquina River with 10.5-foot (3.2 m) vertical clearance and a 15-ton load limit. In 1979, it was added to the National Register of Historic Places, but the wooden pilings supporting the bridge suffered from wood rot, and efforts to restore the bridge fell short in 1981. Fund-raising for repairs had produced $20,000, and restoration had begun when high winds caused another $90,000 damage to the structure. The county did not have enough money to pay for restoration or to pursue an insurance settlement through the courts, and after its destruction, it was delisted from the National Register of Historic Places.

== River park ==
Elk City Park, operated by Lincoln County, is in Elk City. The 2-acre (0.8 ha) area has 12 campsites, parking, day-use areas, and a boat launch. Elk City Park is open all year, but the campground and restrooms are closed from November to March.
