= Greenberry, Oregon =

Unincorporated community in the state of Oregon, United States

Coordinates: 44.454844°N 123.275654°W

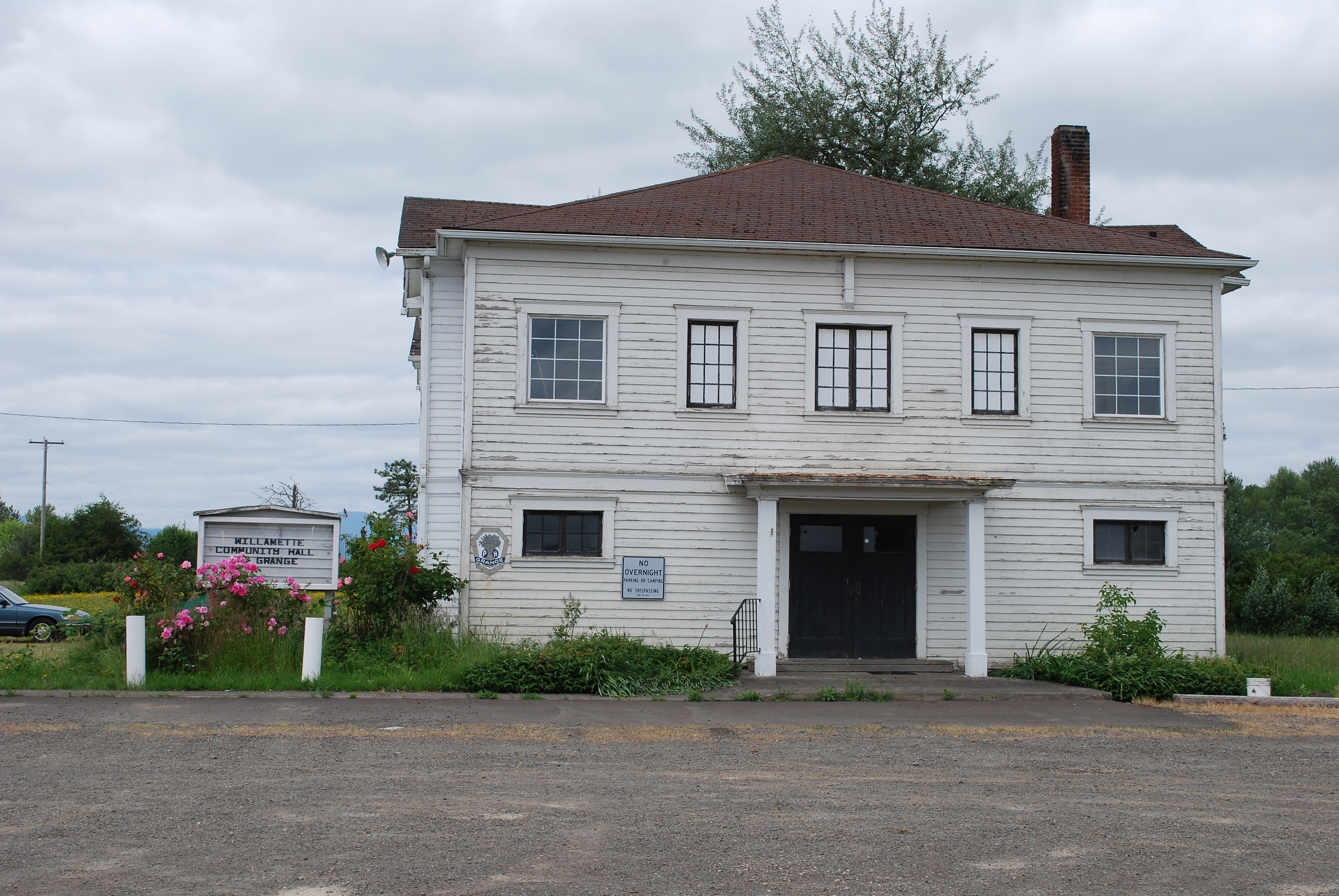
The historic Willamette Grange on Greenberry Road.

Greenberry is an unincorporated community in Benton County, Oregon, United States. It is located on Oregon Route 99W about 8 miles south of Corvallis.

Greenberry was a station on the Westside line of the Southern Pacific Railroad (now owned by Portland and Western) named for Green Berry Smith, a pioneer of 1845 who came with the Meek party and settled in Benton County in 1846. He lived for a time on a farm in the area that bears his name. Smith was usually called Greenberry despite his two given names. Nearby Smith Hill is also named for him.
