= Bellfountain, Oregon =

Unincorporated community in the state of Oregon, United States

Bellfountain
- Unincorporated Community
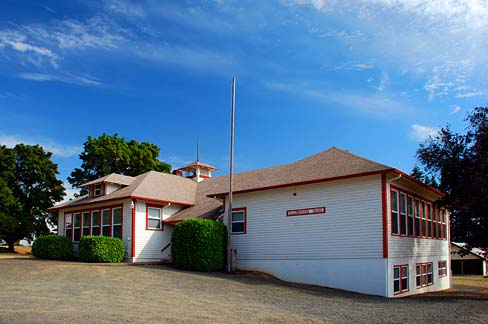
- Bellfountain school in 2009

- Location within Oregon
- Coordinates: 44°21′49″N 123°21′19″W
- Country: United States
- State: Oregon
- County: Benton
- Established: 1895

Area
  - Total: 1.35 sq mi (3.49 km^{2})
  - Land: 1.35 sq mi (3.49 km^{2})
  - Water: 0 sq mi (0.00 km^{2})
- Elevation: 331 ft (101 m)

Population (2020)
  - Total: 74
  - Estimate (2023): 78
  - Density: 54.9/sq mi (21.21/km^{2})
- Time zone: UTC-8 (Pacific)
  - Summer (DST): UTC-7 (Pacific)
- ZIP code: 97456
- FIPS code: 41-05700

Bellfountain is a census-designated place and unincorporated community in Benton County, Oregon, United States. Bellfountain lies on Bellfountain Road north of Alpine and northwest of Monroe. The population was 78 as of the 2023 census population estimates.

== Demographics ==
Historical population
Census	Pop.	Note	%±
2020	74		—
U.S. Decennial Census

== Early history ==
Early on, the area around Bellfountain was known as Belknap's Settlement. A post office was established in 1895 called Dusty. The community's name was later changed to Bellfountain. It was said to be named for Bellefontaine, Ohio. From 1902 to 1905, a Bellfountain post office existed. After 1905, local residents received their mail in Monroe.

Bellfountain has also been said to have been named for the bell fountain, a natural spring that bubbled up about 1 mile west of Bellfountain where Bellfountain Park is located. Flat rocks surrounding the natural artesian spring formed in the shape of a bell. People could view the bell fountain until sometime during the last 40 years when Benton County covered over the bell fountain with a cement building and a pump house to pump the water for use in the park. People are no longer able to view the bell fountain for which some people believe the town was named.

== State Champion School ==
In 1937 the basketball team at Bellfountain High School won the Oregon state championship. At this time Kenneth Litchfield was principal and Burton "Bill" Lemmon was the coach. That was an era when all schools, large and small, were grouped together for playoff purposes. Bellfountain H.S. had a total of twenty-seven students, and their basketball team consisted of eight boys, none over 6 feet tall. After taking the Class B Championship they beat Portland's Franklin High School (a school of 2100 students) in the semi-finals, then competed in the finals against Portland's Lincoln High School. The Bells beat Lincoln by 14 points - their closest game of the season. The Bells boys basketball team also won the 1936 Class B State Championship. The original gymnasium for "Oregon's own Hoosiers" is still on the Bellfountain school grounds with a plaque commemorating the historic team.

=== State championships ===
- Boy's basketball: 1936 (Class B) , 1937 (Class B), 1937 (Class A/B)

== Present-day Bellfountain ==
The local economy is centered on the farming of Christmas trees and grass seed, and on logging.

The people of Benton County have been using Bellfountain Park for over 100 years. The park has a large barbeque pit, softball field, sand volleyball court, horseshoe pits, and restrooms. There is also a covered picnic shelter with a kitchen area and one of the longest picnic tables in the world. The table seats 120 people and is 85-foot-long (26 m) long.
