= St. John's Episcopal Church (Toledo, Oregon) =

Historic church in Oregon, United States

- U.S. National Register of Historic Places
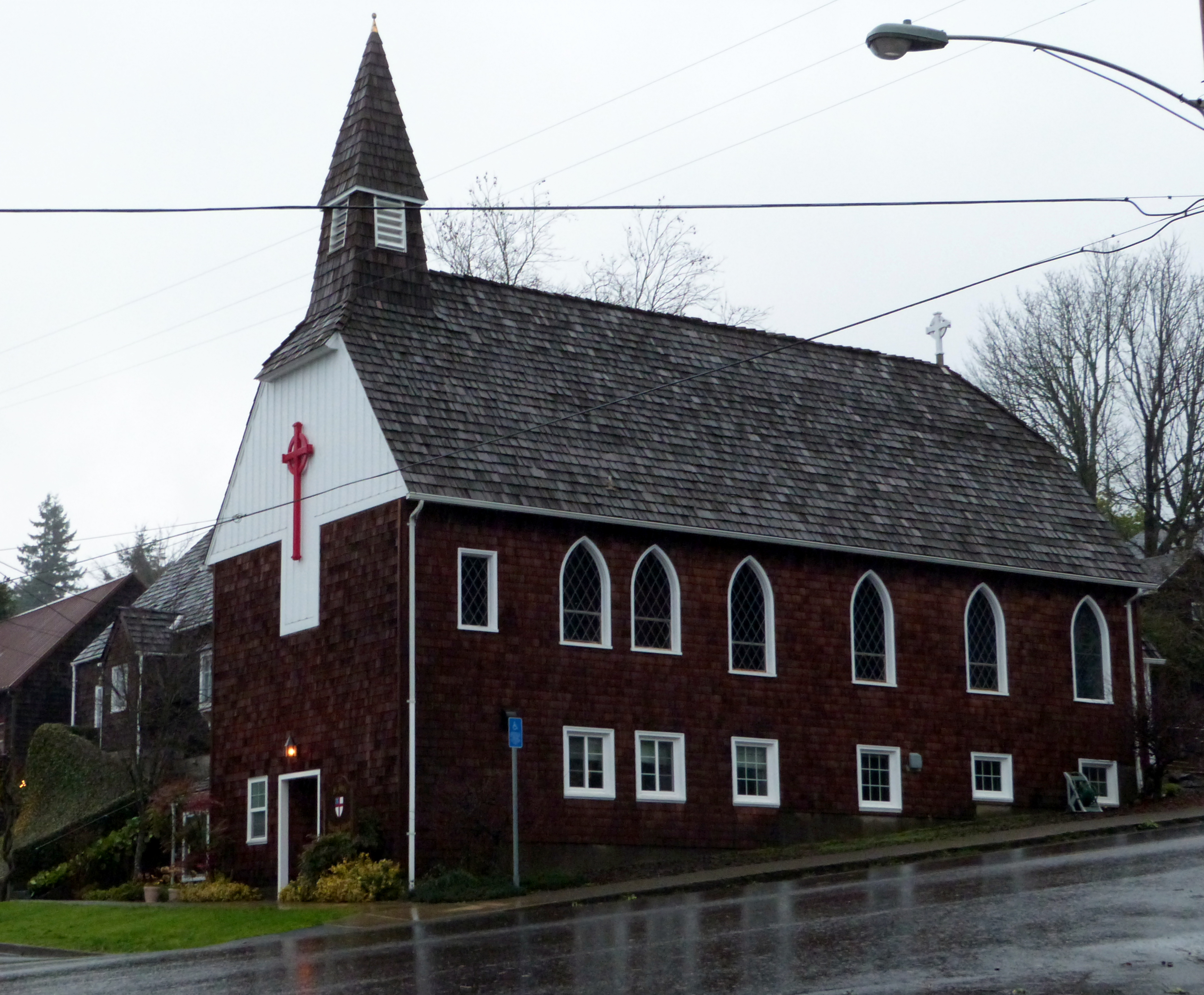
- St. John's Episcopal Church in 2012
- Location: 110 NE Alder Street; Toledo, Oregon
- Coordinates: 44°37′14″N 123°56′08″W
- Area: Less than 1 acre (0.40 ha)
- Built: 1937
- Architect: Lawrence, Holford & Allyn
- Architectural style: Gothic Revival
- MPS: Architecture of Ellis F. Lawrence MPS
- NRHP reference No.: 90001510
- Added to NRHP: October 17, 1990

St. John's Episcopal Church is a church and historic church building located in Toledo, Oregon, United States.

The church was listed on the National Register of Historic Places in 1990.

== See also ==
- National Register of Historic Places listings in Lincoln County, Oregon
