= Eddyville, Oregon =

Unincorporated community in Oregon, United States

- Unincorporated community
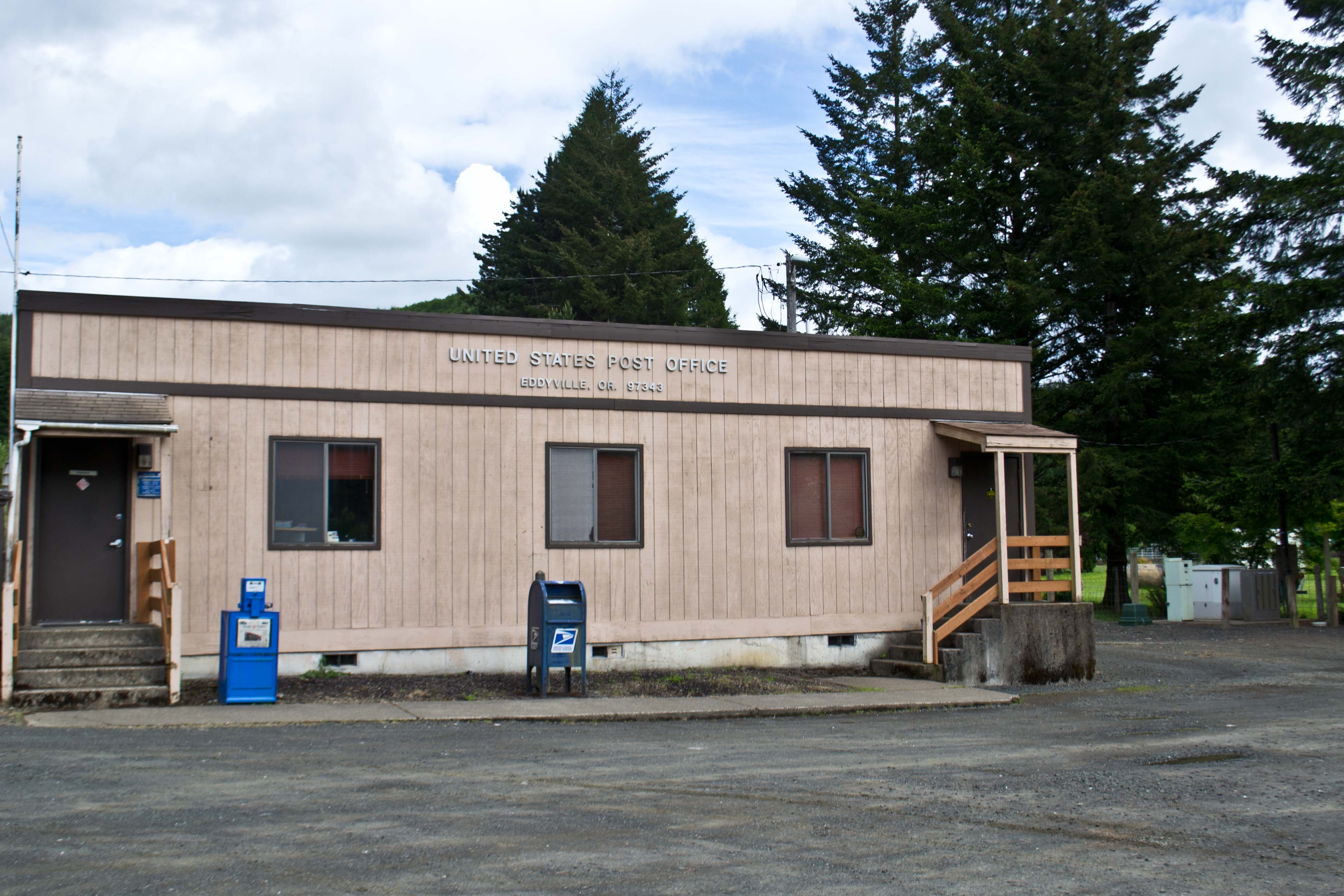
- Eddyville Post Office

- Location within Oregon Location within the United States
- Coordinates: 44°38′04″N 123°46′35″W
- Country: United States
- State: Oregon
- County: Lincoln
- Named for: Israel P. Eddy
- Elevation: 85 ft (26 m)
- Time zone: UTC-8 (PST)
  - Summer (DST): UTC-7 (PDT)
- ZIP codes: 97343
- Area code: 541
- Coordinates and elevation from United States Geological Survey

Eddyville is an unincorporated community in Lincoln County, in the U.S. state of Oregon. Eddyville's unofficial estimated population as of 2014 was about 400 to 500.

Eddyville lies at the intersection of U.S. Route 20 and Oregon Route 180 east of Chitwood and at the confluence of Little Elk Creek and the Yaquina River.

The community was named by and for Israel F. Eddy, who was postmaster here in 1888. The post office, originally established in 1868, had been called "Little Elk", for the nearby creek, until Eddy moved it further from the creek and renamed it. Subsequent back-and-forth moves and name changes through 1900 resulted in a post office near the mouth of the creek but with the name "Eddyville".

In the late 19th century, Eddyville was one of the stops on the Oregon Pacific Railroad, linking the former port city of Yaquina to Corvallis and Albany. After the Oregon Pacific failed financially, fell into receivership, and went through 17 years of financial and legal complications, it became a branch line of the Southern Pacific in 1907.
