= Charles and Theresa Roper House =

Historic house in Oregon, United States

- U.S. National Register of Historic Places
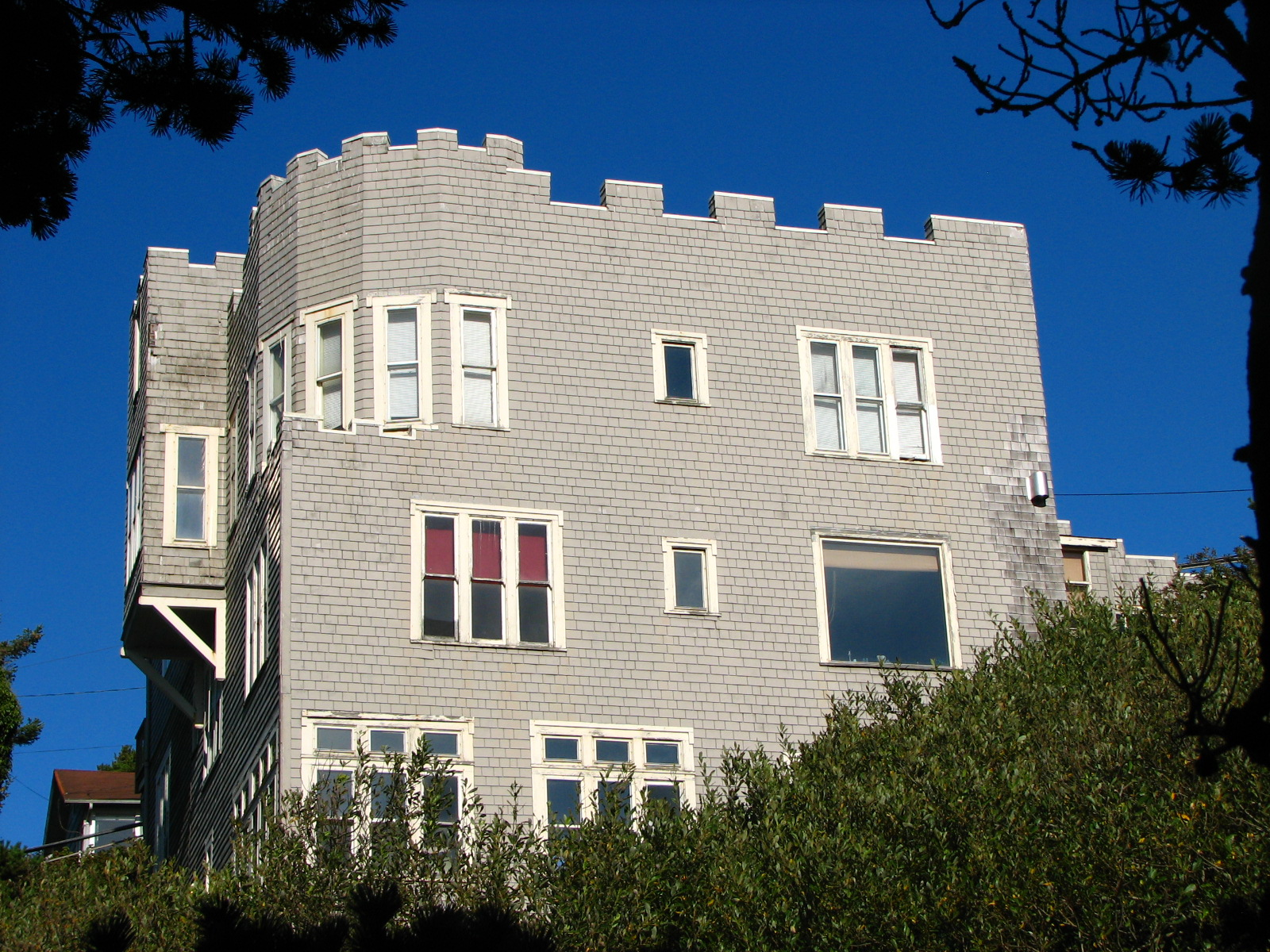
- The Roper House in 2008

- Location within Oregon Location within the United States
- Location: 620 SW Alder Street; Newport, Oregon
- Coordinates: 44°38′00″N 124°03′32″W
- Built: 1912–1913
- Built by: Charles (Charlie) Bickford
- Architectural style: Castellated Gothic Revival
- NRHP reference No.: 81000500
- Added to NRHP: December 9, 1981

The Charles and Theresa Roper House, also known as Hilan Castle, is a historic residence located in Newport, Oregon, United States. Built in 1912–1913 to evoke a castle in the Scottish Highlands, it features such Medieval-inspired elements as a crenellated parapet, mullioned windows, a rounded corner tower, and a cantilevered turret. It is one of very few examples of the Castellated Gothic Revival style in Oregon, other than local armories. Its first owners, both Canadian immigrants, were locally notable figures: Charles Roper was a professional photographer whose work comprises an important documentary record of central Lincoln County in the 1910s and 1920s. He was elected mayor of Newport in 1922, and maintained a photography studio on the top floor of his house. Theresa Roper was the writer and illustrator of several books of romanticized history, and was a collector of local Native American objects that she used as a basis for her illustrations.

The house was converted from single-family use to apartments in 1975. It was entered on the National Register of Historic Places in 1981.

== See also ==
- National Register of Historic Places listings in Lincoln County, Oregon
