= Chitwood, Oregon =

Unincorporated community in Oregon, United States

- Unincorporated community
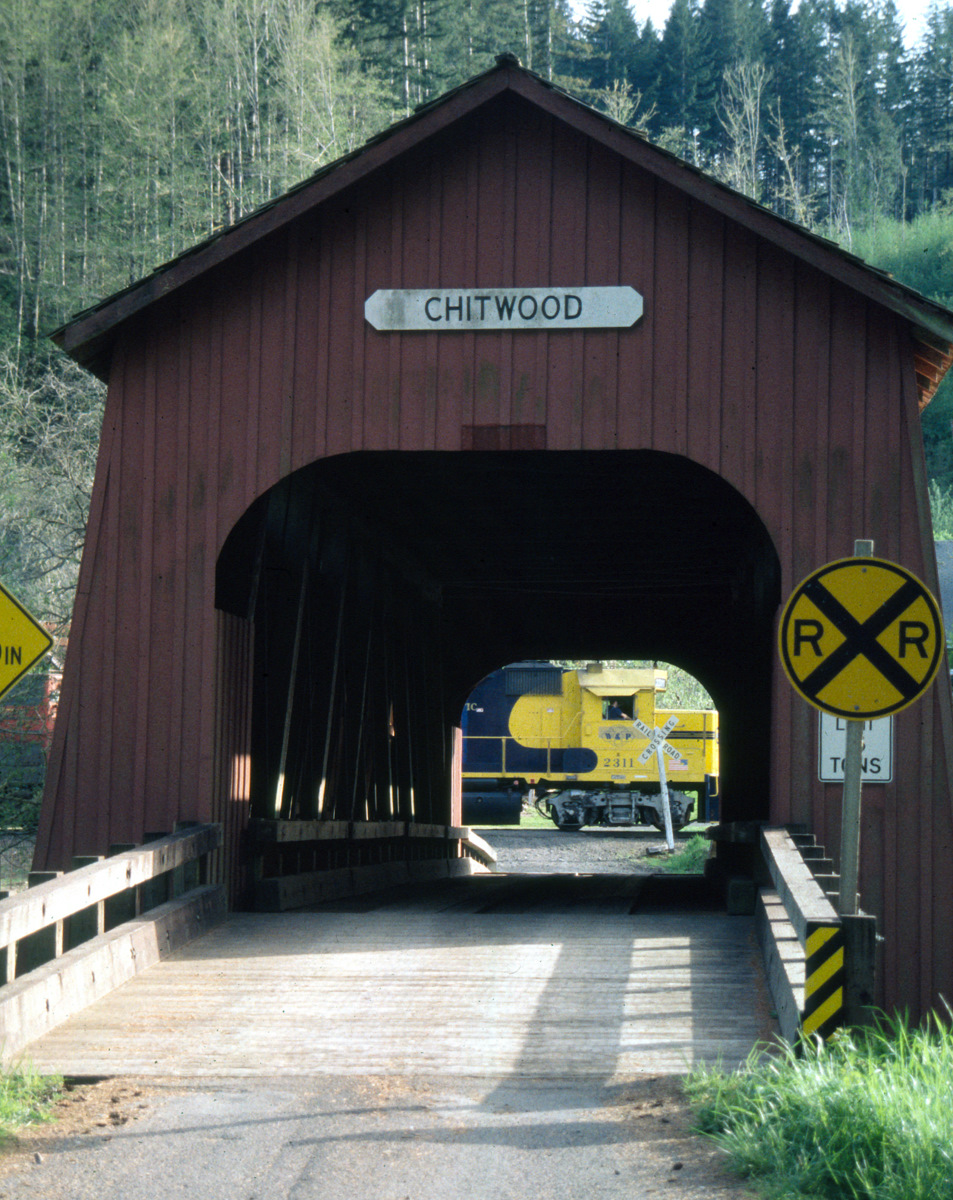
- Chitwood Bridge

- Location within Oregon Location within the United States
- Coordinates: 44°39′17″N 123°49′21″W
- Country: United States
- State: Oregon
- County: Lincoln
- Elevation: 141 ft (43 m)
- Time zone: UTC-8 (PST)
  - Summer (DST): UTC-7 (PDT)
- Coordinates and elevation from United States Geological Survey

Chitwood is an unincorporated community in Lincoln County, Oregon, United States. Chitwood lies on U.S. Route 20 between Toledo to the west and Eddyville to the east. The Yaquina River flows through Chitwood.

Historically, Chitwood was a station on the railway line between Corvallis and Toledo. It was named for Joshua Chitwood, who lived nearby during construction of the railway, 1881–85. The line was originally known as the Yaquina Route of the Oregon Pacific Railroad, linking the former port city of Yaquina to Corvallis and Albany. After the Oregon Pacific failed financially, fell into receivership, and went through 17 years of financial and legal complications, in 1907 it became a branch line of the Southern Pacific.

The post office in Chitwood opened in 1887 and closed in 1945.

Lincoln County built Chitwood Bridge, a covered bridge, at Chitwood in 1926. Scheduled for demolition, it was instead improved in 1984 through a federally funded restoration project. The Howe truss bridge is 96 feet (29 m) long.
