= Nashville, Oregon =

Unincorporated community in the state of Oregon, United States

- Unincorporated community
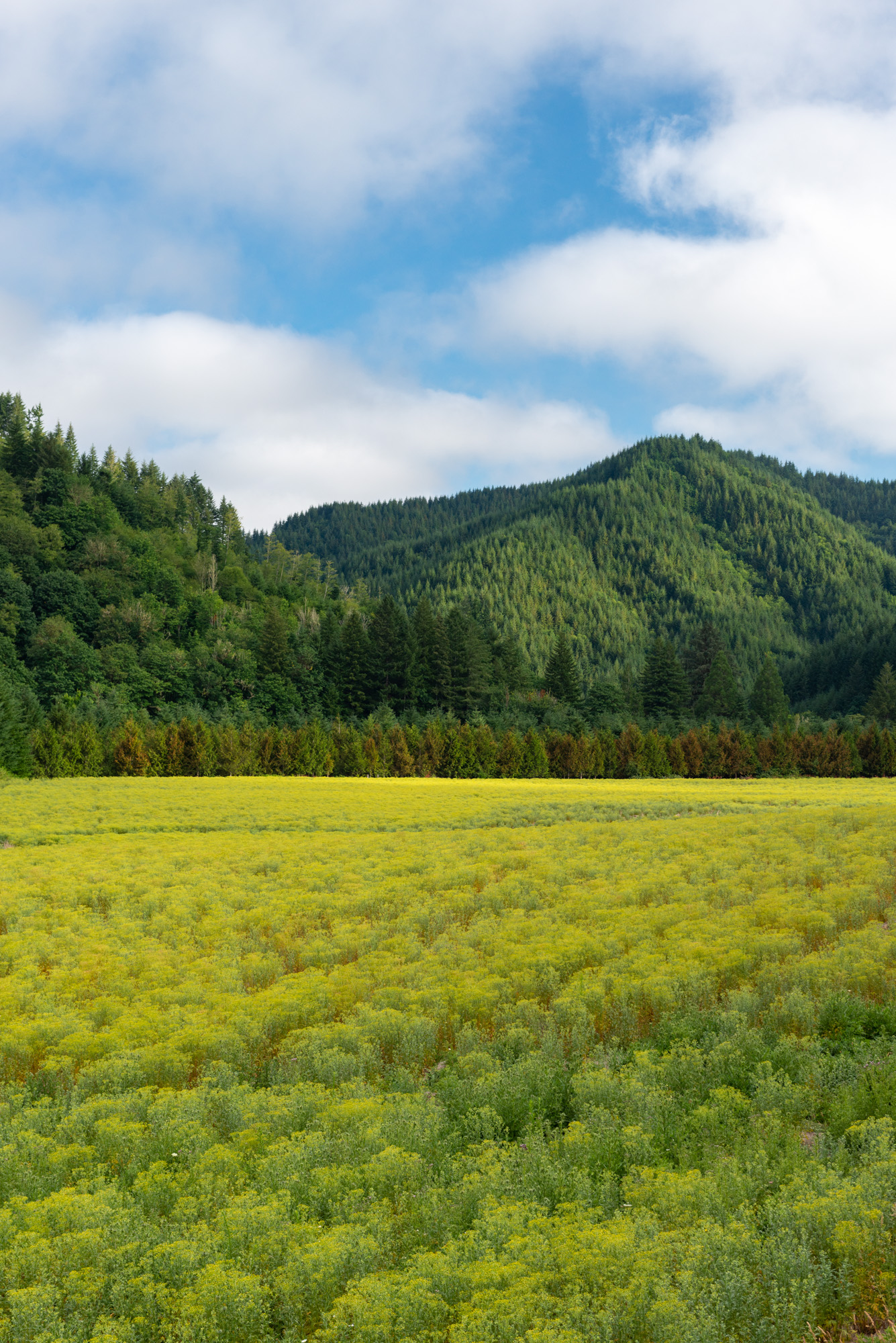
- Agricultural field just off Nashville Road in Nashville

- Location within Oregon Location within the United States
- Coordinates: 44.653°N 123.608°W
- Country: United States
- State: Oregon
- County: Lincoln
- Elevation: 239 ft (73 m)
- Time zone: UTC-8 (Pacific (PST))
  - Summer (DST): UTC-7 (PDT)
- ZIP code: 97326
- Area codes: 458 and 541

Nashville is an unincorporated community in Lincoln County, Oregon, United States. Its post office opened in 1888 and closed in 1978 and is now served by the Blodgett, Oregon, 97326 post office. It was founded by Wallis Nash, who came from England to settle in Oregon in 1879. He died in Nashville in 1926.
