= Blodgett, Oregon =

Unincorporated community in the state of Oregon, United States

- Unincorporated community
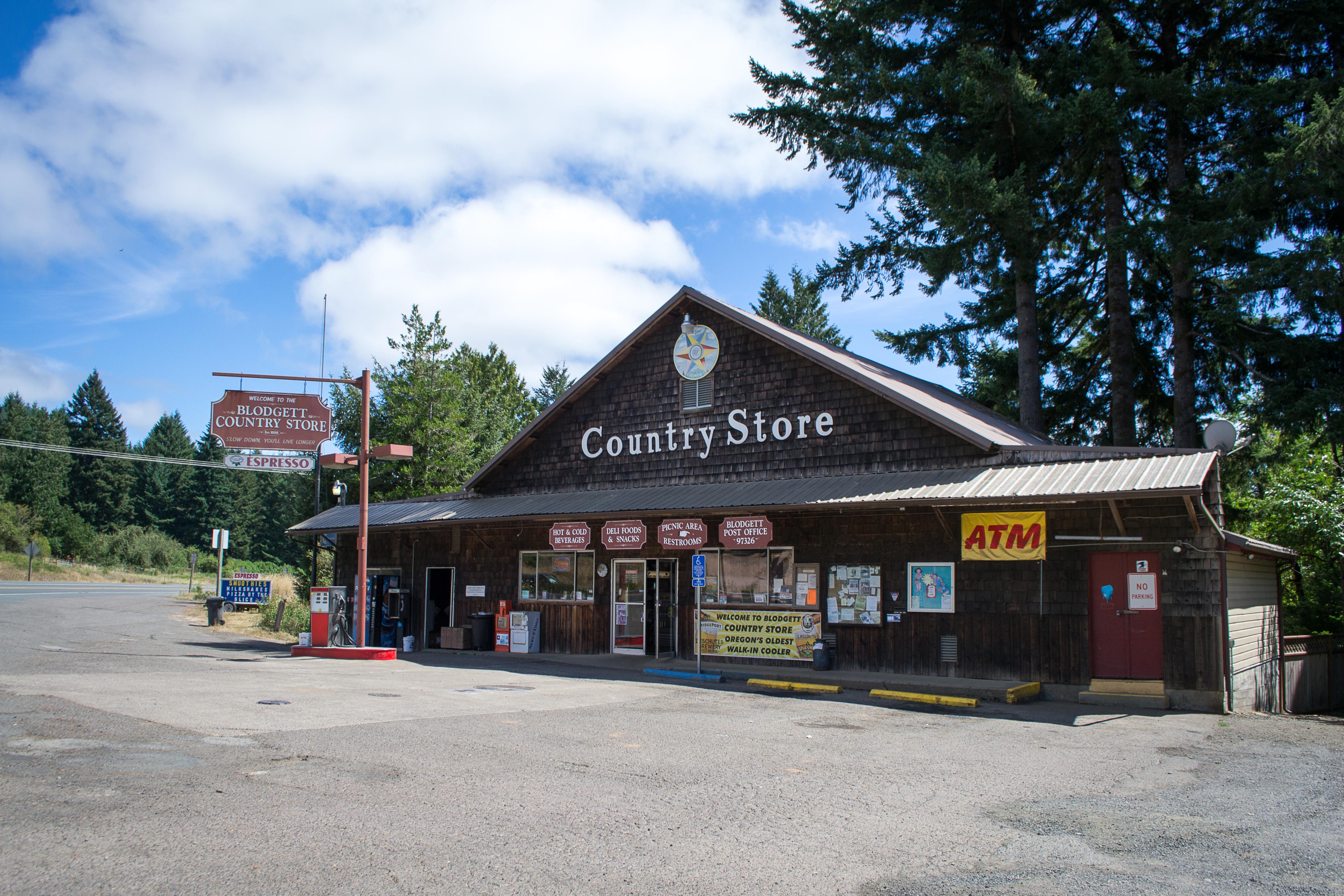
- The Blodgett Country Store

- Location within the state of Oregon Blodgett, Oregon (the United States)
- Coordinates: 44°35′49″N 123°31′10″W
- Country: United States
- State: Oregon
- County: Benton
- Named after: William Blodgett, a pioneer settler

Area
  - Total: 0.56 sq mi (1.44 km^{2})
  - Land: 0.56 sq mi (1.44 km^{2})
  - Water: 0 sq mi (0.00 km^{2})
- Elevation: 640 ft (200 m)

Population (2020)
  - Total: 42
  - Density: 76/sq mi (29.2/km^{2})
- Time zone: UTC-8 (PST)
  - Summer (DST): UTC-7 (PDT)
- ZIP codes: 97326
- Area code: 541
- FIPS code: 41-06950
- GNIS feature ID: 1138266

Blodgett is a census-designated place (CDP) and unincorporated community in Benton County, Oregon, United States, where Oregon Route 180 meets U.S. Route 20 in the Central Oregon Coast Range 15 miles (24 km) west of Corvallis. It is near the confluence of the Tumtum and Marys rivers. As of the 2020 census, the community had a population of 42.

Blodgett was named for pioneer settler William Blodgett. The post office was established in April 1888 with the name "Emrick", for a local family, and was changed to Blodgett shortly thereafter. Its ZIP code is 97326.

Blodgett is part of the Philomath School District. The 38-student Blodgett Elementary School serves kindergarten through fourth grade; older students attend schools in nearby Philomath.

== Climate ==
This region experiences warm (but not hot) and dry summers, with no average monthly temperatures above 71.6 °F (22.0 °C). According to the Köppen Climate Classification system, Blodgett has a warm-summer Mediterranean climate, abbreviated "Csb" on climate maps.

== Demographics ==
Historical population
Census	Pop.	Note	%±
2020	42		—
U.S. Decennial Census
