= Summit, Oregon =

Unincorporated community in Benton County, Oregon, United States

Summit
- Census-designated place
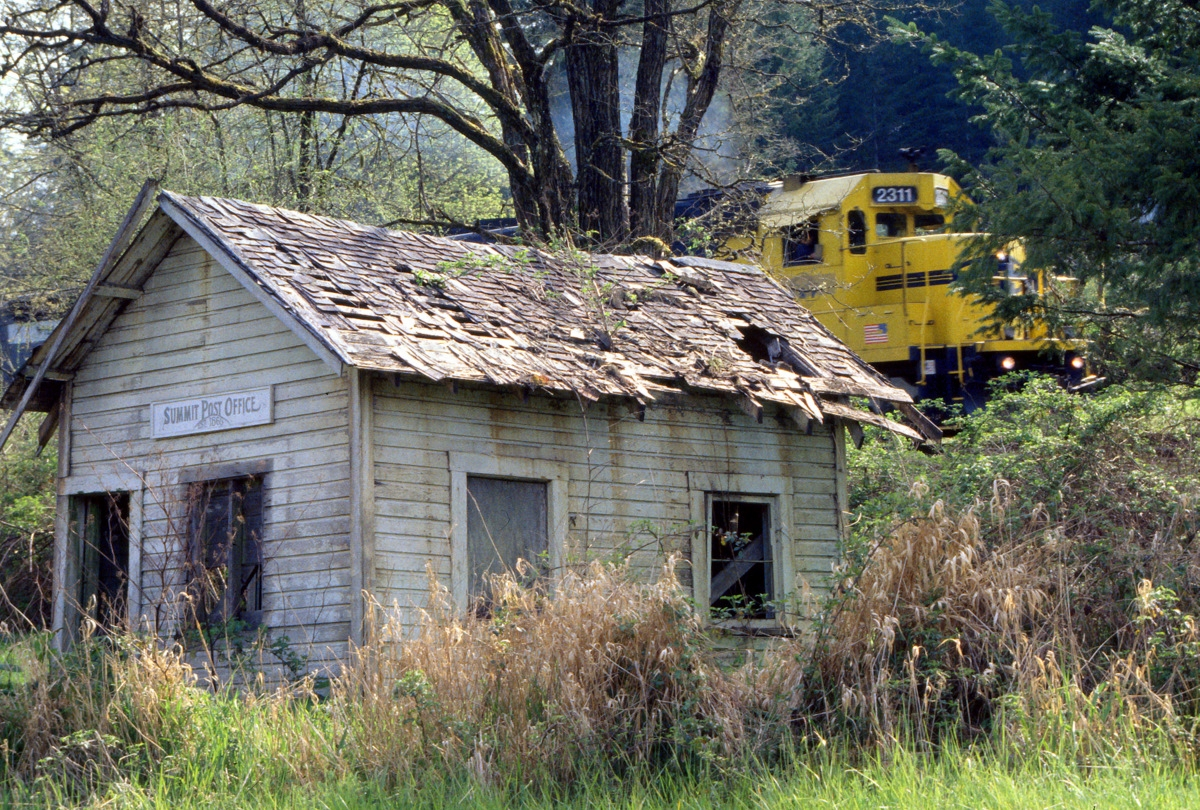
- A train passing by Summit's former post office

- Position in Oregon
- Coordinates: 44.6379°N 123.5787°W
- State: Oregon

Area
  - Total: 0.32 sq mi (0.83 km^{2})
  - Land: 0.32 sq mi (0.83 km^{2})
  - Water: 0 sq mi (0.00 km^{2})
- Elevation: 718 ft (219 m)

Population (2020)
  - Total: 72
  - Estimate (2023): 177
  - Density: 225.6/sq mi (87.12/km^{2})
- Time zone: UTC-8 (Pacific (PST))
  - Summer (DST): UTC-7 (PDT)
- ZIP code: 97326
- Area codes: 458 and 541
- FIPS code: 41-70870

Summit is an unincorporated community and census-designated place in Benton County, Oregon, United States. At the 2023 census population estimates, it had a population of 177. Summit lies on Oregon Route 180 northwest of Blodgett. Summit has an elevation of 718 feet (219 m).

Since 1980 Summit is known locally for its small Summit Summer Festival on the third Saturday in August. At the Hippie-style gathering with food and music artisans offer their products, e.g. hand made knives, quilts; artists make their shows e.g. big soap bubbles and visitors get involved.

== Demographics ==
Historical population
Census	Pop.	Note	%±
2020	72		—
U.S. Decennial Census
