= Alpine, Oregon =

Unincorporated community in the state of Oregon, United States

- City
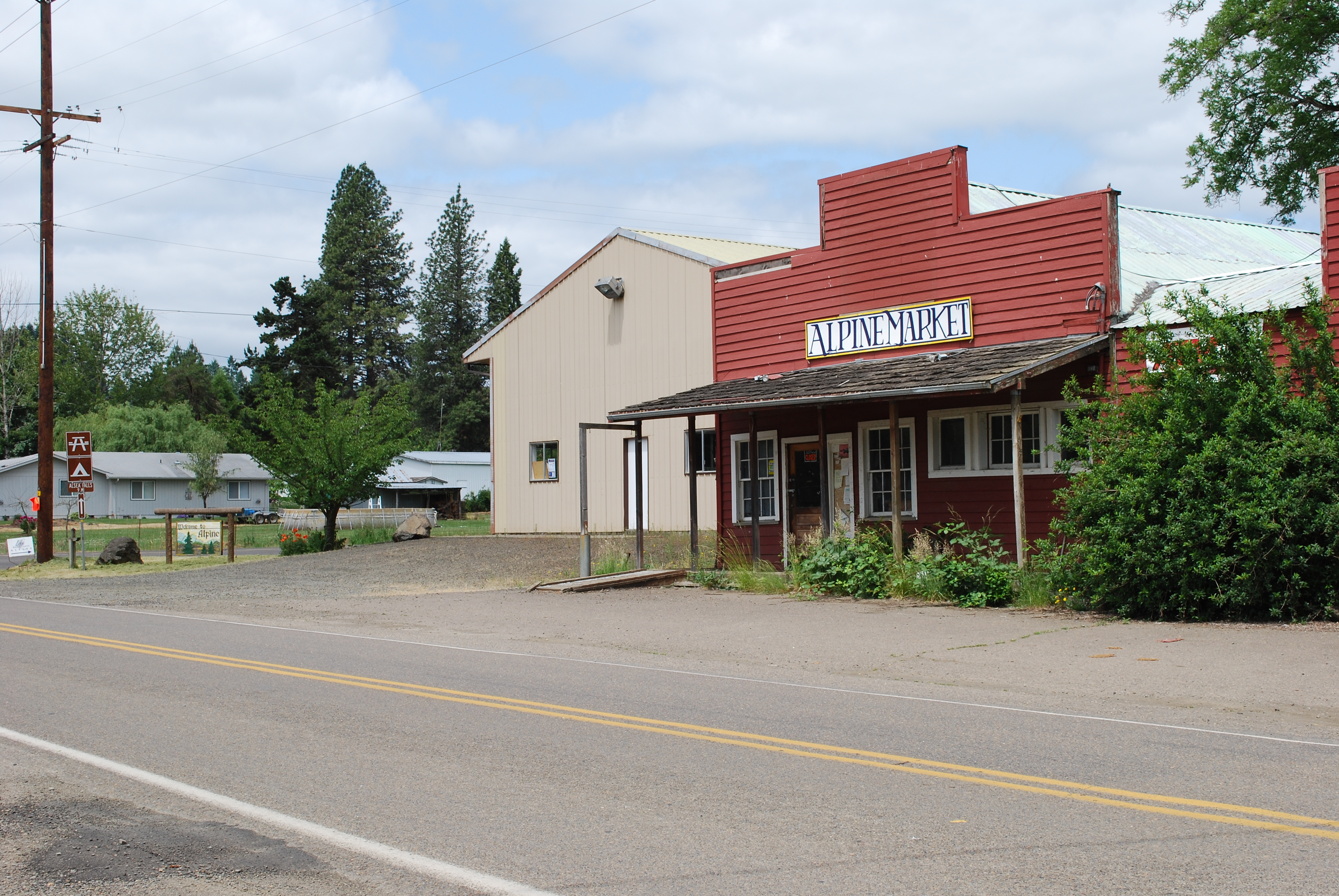
- Alpine Market and fire station

- Location in Oregon
- Coordinates: 44.33028°N 123.35917°W
- Country: United States
- State: Oregon
- County: Benton

Population (2020)
  - Total: 164
  - Estimate (2023): 258
- Time zone: UTC-8 (Pacific)
  - Summer (DST): UTC-7 (Pacific)
- ZIP code: 97456
- Area codes: 458 and 541

Alpine is an unincorporated rural community and census-designated place in Benton County, Oregon, United States. It is west of Monroe off Oregon Route 99W. As of the 2023 Census population estimates, the population was 258.

== History ==
Alpine was so named because it is on the top of one of the foothills of the Central Oregon Coast Range. It is noted that the "situation is not particularly alpine in character". Alpine School operated for several years before there was a settlement in the location, thus the community took its name from the school. In 1908, the Corvallis and Alsea River Railway Company began construction of a line that ended in the settlement of Alpine when funding ran out. The community has burned three times since its heyday in the early 1900s. A post office was established in 1912 and operated until 1976. Alpine now has a Monroe mailing address. Alpine Elementary School closed in 2003. When the Alpine Market closed in 2004, the Alpine Tavern (built in 1936) started selling groceries. In 2005, a vintage photograph of the tavern was featured in a Miller Beer advertisement, and the market was due to be razed.

As of December 2023, the Alpine Tavern was still a thriving business and community hub, preserving area history. The town is often visited by passersby on their way to either Alsea Falls or the Oregon Coast.

== Museums and other points of interest ==
Alpine has a small community park called Alpine Chapel Park. It is an approximately 4-acre area. It has picnic tables, a swing set, and a shelter. It is maintained by volunteers. This is a great place to bring the family and dog.

Alpine is on the Benton County Scenic Loop, a scenic driving route.

To the west of Alpine is the Woodhall Vineyard, a research vineyard operated by Oregon State University.
