= U.S. Route 20 in Oregon =

Section of U.S. Highway in Oregon

U.S. Highway 20
- US 20 highlighted in red

Route information
- Maintained by ODOT
- Length: 451.25 mi (726.22 km)
- Existed: 1940–present

Major junctions
- West end: US 101 in Newport
- OR 34 in Philomath; OR 99W in Corvallis; OR 99E in Albany; I-5 in Albany; OR 126 west of Santiam Pass; US 97 in Bend; US 395 in Riley; US 26 in Vale
- East end: US 20 / US 26 at the Idaho state line in Nyssa

Location
- Country: United States
- State: Oregon
- Counties: Lincoln, Benton, Linn, Jefferson, Deschutes, Lake, Harney, Malheur

Highway system
- United States Numbered Highway System; List; Special; Divided; Oregon Highways; Interstate; US; State; Named; Scenic
← OR 19	→ OR 22

U.S. Route 20 (US 20) is a major west–east cross-state highway in the northern part of the U.S. state of Oregon, especially east of the Cascade Mountains. It connects U.S. Route 101 in Newport on the central Oregon Coast to the Idaho state line east of Nyssa.

== Route description ==
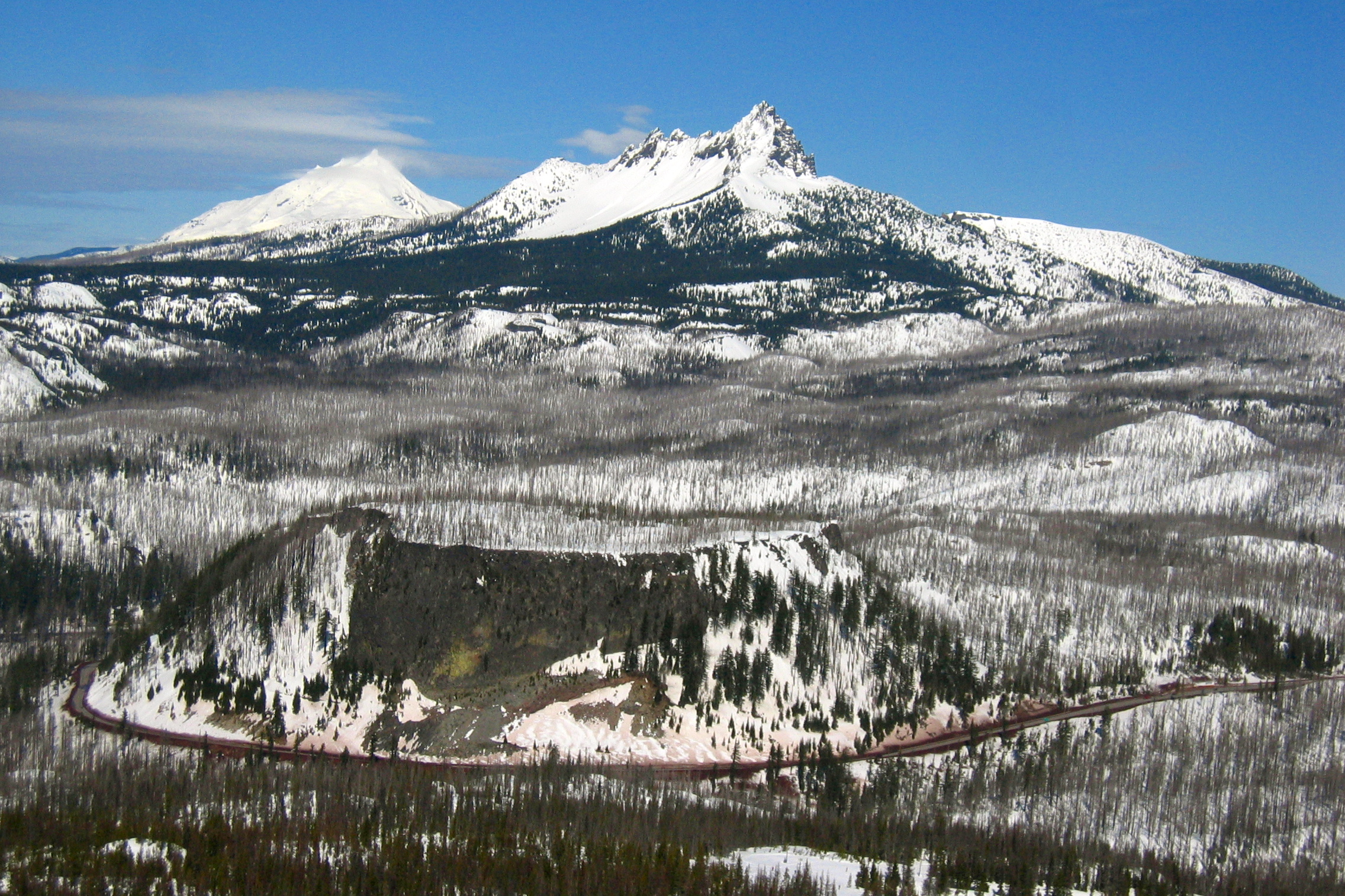
US 20 crossing the Cascade Range at Santiam Pass.

US 20 starts at an intersection with US 101 in Newport, and travels eastward over the Central Oregon Coast Range to Corvallis. In Corvallis, it intersects Oregon Route 99W (OR 99W) and briefly travels concurrent with OR 34 before proceeding northeast to Albany. From Albany, US 20 briefly travels concurrent with OR 99E before turning east through Lebanon and Sweet Home and entering the Cascade Mountains. It intersects OR 126 west of Santiam Pass and the two routes travel concurrent through Sisters. US 20 then continues eastward and southward to Bend, where it travels roughly parallel to US 97 for about 3 miles (4.8 km) before turning east through Brothers and Riley. At Riley, US 20 travels concurrent with US 395 through Hines and Burns to about 2 miles (3.2 km) northeast of Burns. From Burns, US 20 continues east through Juntura and Vale. In Vale, US 20 travels concurrent with US 26, and the two highways continue east to Cairo Junction, south of Ontario, and turn south, where they then also travel concurrently with OR 201 to Nyssa. Eastward from Nyssa, US 20/US 26 continue to the Idaho state line. The route throughout most of Oregon serves as an important link between Central and Southern Oregon and far Northern California to Boise, Idaho.

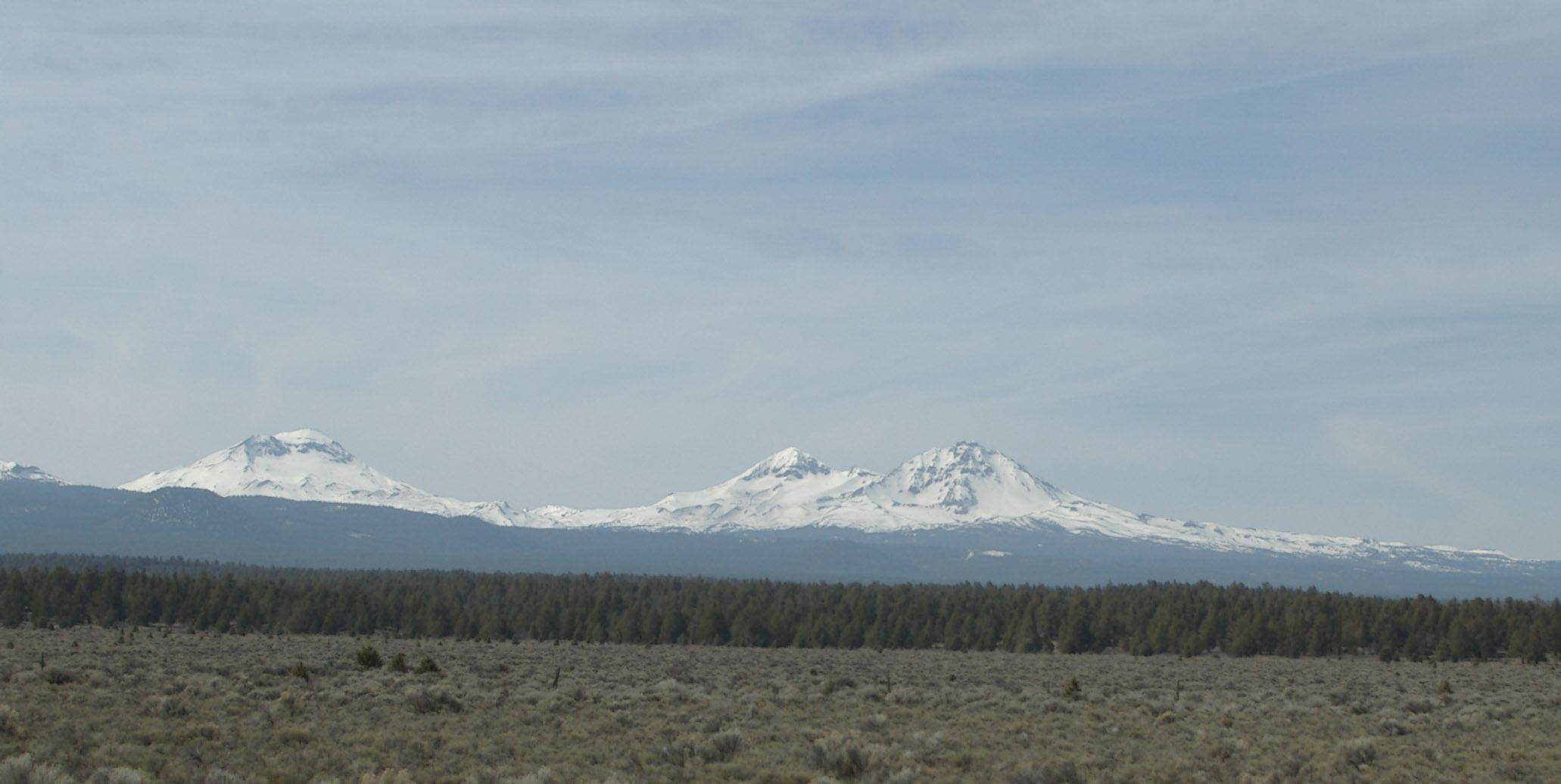
US 20 viewpoint of the Three Sisters mountains just east of the town of Sisters, Oregon

== History ==
Under the initial 1925 plan for the United States Numbered Highway System, US 20 was originally planned to follow the Columbia River from Astoria to Pendleton and continue southeast into Idaho. The Oregon Highway Commission requested that US 30 be assigned to the Columbia River Highway instead and have US 20 truncated at Pocatello, Idaho. The American Association of State Highway Officials ultimately agreed to truncate US 20 further to Yellowstone National Park, but later extended it via central Oregon in 1940.

A 10-mile (16 km) section of the Corvallis–Newport Highway between Chitwood to Eddyville was replaced by the Oregon Department of Transportation (ODOT) in the early 21st century to accommodate higher traffic volumes. The section, originally opened in 1917, was winding and had no shoulder for vehicle breakdowns. Construction on a straighter, 5.5-mile (8.9 km) route began in 2005 and was planned to be completed in 2009, but landslides and other hazards caused delays. In 2012, ODOT took over the project from the original design–build contractor after an agreement was reached in their liability dispute. The project was completed in October 2016 at a cost of $365 million.

In 2017, the Oregon legislature designated Oregon’s 451-mile stretch of U.S. Route 20 as the state’s official Medal of Honor Highway. Twelve roadside signs were placed along the route to honor Oregon’s Medal of Honor recipients. Oregon was the first state to designate a border-to-border route as its official Medal of Honor Highway. Supporters hope other states will extend the Medal of Honor designation from the Oregon border to highway’s eastern terminus in Massachusetts.

== Oregon highway designations ==
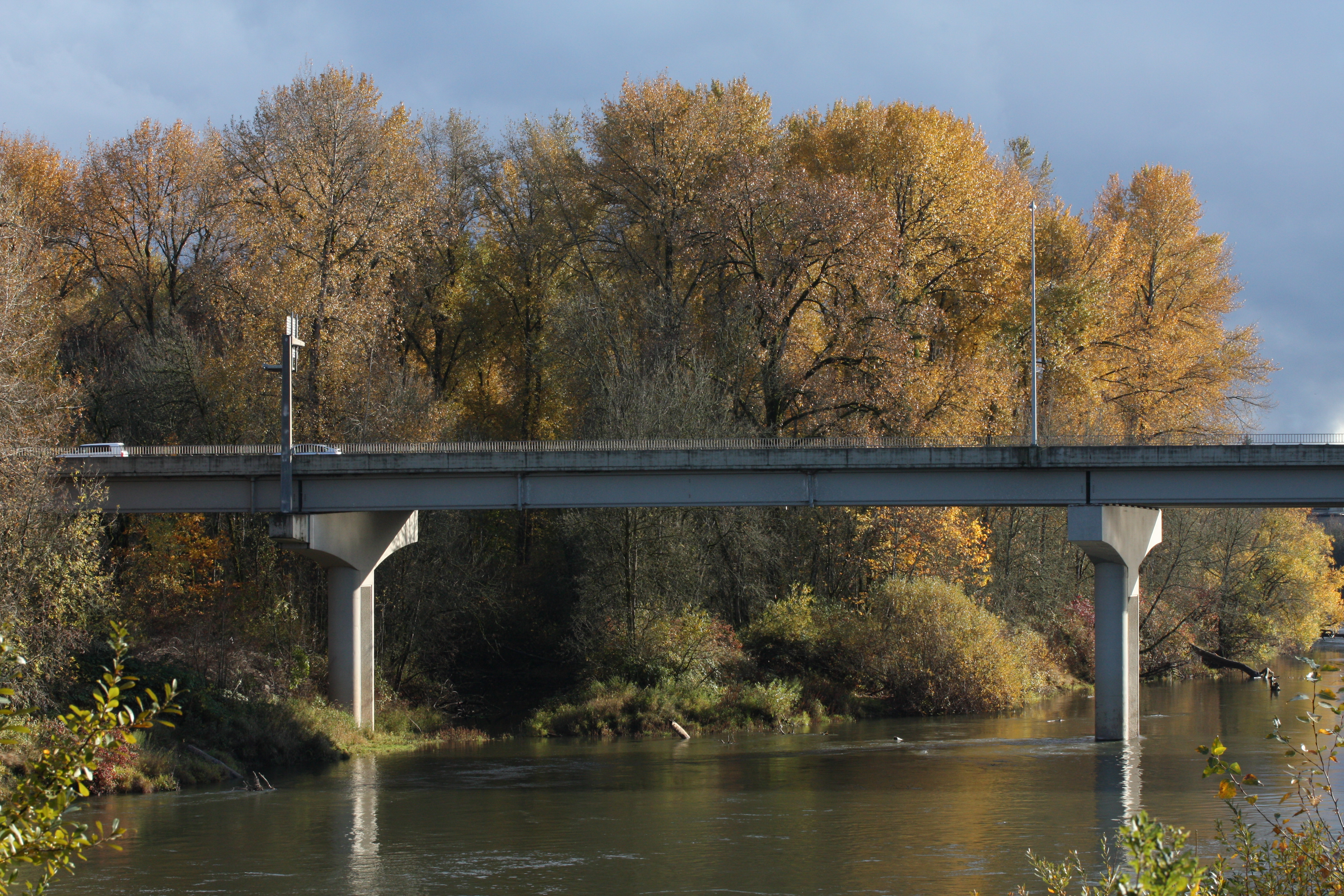
Bridge over the Willamette River in Corvallis, Oregon

The Oregon section of US 20 consists of the following highways numbered using ODOT's internal numbering system (see Oregon highways and routes), from west to east:

- The Corvallis-Newport Highway No. 33;
- Part of the Corvallis-Lebanon Highway No. 210;
- The Albany-Corvallis Highway No. 31;
- The Santiam Highway No. 16;
- Part of the McKenzie Highway No. 15;
- The McKenzie-Bend Highway No. 17;
- The Central Oregon Highway No. 7.

== Major intersections ==
Milepoints are as reported by ODOT and do not necessarily reflect current mileage. Z indicates overlapping mileage due to construction longer than established route, and – indicates negative mileage behind established beginning point. Segments that are locally maintained may be omitted. For routes traversing multiple named state highways, each milepoint is preceded by the corresponding state highway number.

County	Location	Milepoint	Destinations	Notes
Lincoln	Newport	33 0.00	US 101 south – Waldport, Florence US 101 north – Depoe Bay, Lincoln City	Western terminus of US 20
Lincoln		33 5.62	US 20 Bus. east – Toledo	
Lincoln		33 5.74	OR 229 – Siletz, Toledo	
Lincoln		33 7.49	US 20 Bus. west – Toledo	
Lincoln		33 10.34	Pioneer Mountain summit, elevation 377 feet (115 m)	
Lincoln		33 23.18	OR 180 east (Eddyville–Blodgett Road) – Nashville, Summit	
Lincoln		33 31.08	Cline Hill summit, elevation 770 feet (230 m)	
Benton		33 38.28	Dudley Hill summit, elevation 860 feet (260 m)	
Benton		33 39.39	OR 180 west (Eddyville–Blodgett Highway) – Summit, Nashville	
Benton		33 41.78	Gellately Hill summit, elevation 789 feet (240 m)	
Benton		33 44.57	OR 223 north – Wren, Kings Valley	
Benton		33 49.73	OR 34 west – Alsea, Waldport	Western end of concurrency with OR 34
Benton	Corvallis	33 55.67 91 (2)84.07	OR 34 east to I-5	Interchange; eastern end of concurrency with OR 34; eastbound exit and westbound entrance
Benton	Corvallis	33 55.67 91 (2)84.07	OR 99W south – Junction City, Eugene	Interchange; western end of concurrency with OR 99W; westbound exit and eastbound entrance
Benton	Corvallis	91 (2)83.42 210 –0.05	OR 99W north (NW 3rd Street) – Monmouth, McMinnville	Eastern end of concurrency with OR 99W
Benton	Corvallis	210 0.00 31 0.10	To OR 34 east / I-5 – Lebanon	
Benton–Linn county line	Albany	31 10.44	Willamette River	
Linn	Albany	31 11.28 58 2.25	OR 99E south (Pacific Boulevard SW) – Junction City	Western end of concurrency with OR 99E
Linn	Albany	58 (2)1.45 16 –0.03	OR 99E north to I-5 north – Salem, Portland	Eastern end of concurrency with OR 99E; eastbound exit and westbound entrance
Linn	Albany	16 1.04– 16 1.08	I-5 – Eugene, Roseburg, Salem, Portland	Exit 233 on I-5
Linn		16 6.55	OR 226 east – Crabtree, Scio, Lyons	
Linn	Lebanon	16 12.80	OR 34 west – Corvallis	
Linn	Sweet Home	16 27.07	OR 228 west (Holley Road) – Brownsville, Halsey	
Linn	Sweet Home	16 31.19	Viewpoint (Foster Lake)	
Linn		16 46.93	Historical marker (Santiam Wagon Road)	
Linn		16 63.64	Tombstone Pass summit, elevation 4,236 feet (1,291 m)	
Linn		16 71.52	OR 126 west (McKenzie Highway) – Springfield, Eugene	Western end of Route 126 concurrency
Linn		16 74.90	OR 22 west – Detroit, Salem	
Linn–Jefferson county line		16 80.77	Santiam Pass summit, elevation 4,817 feet (1,468 m)	
Jefferson		16 84.57	Viewpoint (Mount Washington)	
Deschutes		16 99.53	Historical marker (Santiam Pass Road)	
Deschutes	Sisters	16 100.12 15 Z92.03	OR 242 west – McKenzie Pass	
Deschutes	Sisters	15 93.07 17 0.00	OR 126 east – Redmond, Prineville	Eastern end of concurrency with OR 126
Deschutes		17 9.09– 17 9.18	Viewpoint	
Deschutes	Bend	17 18.51	US 97 Bus. north (NE 3rd Street)	Interchange; western end of concurrency with US 97 Bus.
Deschutes	Bend	17 19.86	US 97 south – Mt. Bachelor, Klamath Falls	Interchange; eastbound exit only
Deschutes	Bend	17 19.86	US 97 north – Redmond, Portland	Interchange; westbound exit only
Deschutes	Bend	17 20.99 7 0.51	US 97 Bus. south (NE 3rd Street) – Klamath Falls	Eastern end of concurrency with US 97 Bus.
Deschutes		7 19.95	Historical marker (prehistoric river)	
Deschutes		7 20.56	Horse Ridge summit, elevation 4,291 feet (1,308 m)	
Deschutes		7 35.65	OR 27 north – Prineville Reservoir	
Lake	No major junctions			
Harney		7 103.03	Historical marker (Bannock War)	
Harney		7 104.69	US 395 south – Wagontire, Valley Falls, Lakeview	Western end of concurrency with US 395
Harney	Burns	7 131.50	OR 78 east (East Monroe Street) – Crane, Winnemucca	
Harney		7 134.29	US 395 north – John Day, Pendleton	Eastern end of concurrency with US 395
Harney		7 144.25	Historical marker (Fort Harney)	
Harney		7 155.09	Historical marker (Great Basin)	
Harney		7 160.79	Stinkingwater Pass, elevation 4,848 feet (1,478 m)	
Harney		7 177.54	Drinkwater Pass, elevation 4,212 feet (1,284 m)	
Malheur		7 232.99	Vines Hill summit, elevation 2,886 feet (880 m)	
Malheur		7 238.78	Graham Boulevard (Vale–West Highway No. 451) – Bully Creek Reservoir	
Malheur	Vale	7 245.46	Graham Boulevard (Vale–West Highway No. 451)	
Malheur	Vale	7 246.39	US 26 west (Glenn Street North) – Unity, John Day	Western end of concurrency with US 26
Malheur		7 253.48	Viewpoint (Trenkel Hill vista)	
Malheur	Cairo Junction	7 258.20	OR 201 north to I-84 – Ontario	Western end of concurrency with OR 201
Malheur	Nyssa	7 265.97	OR 201 south – Adrian, Lake Owyhee	Eastern end of Route 201 concurrency
Malheur	Nyssa	7 266.82	US 20 east / US 26 east – Nampa, Boise	Continuation into Idaho across Snake River
1.000 mi = 1.609 km; 1.000 km = 0.621 mi: Concurrency terminus; Incomplete access

== Special routes ==
US 20 has 2 business routes in Oregon: one in Toledo, and one in Bend.

== See also ==
- Ghosts of Highway 20

U.S. Route 20
Previous state: Terminus	Oregon	Next state: Idaho
