= Benton County, Oregon =

County in Oregon, United States

- County
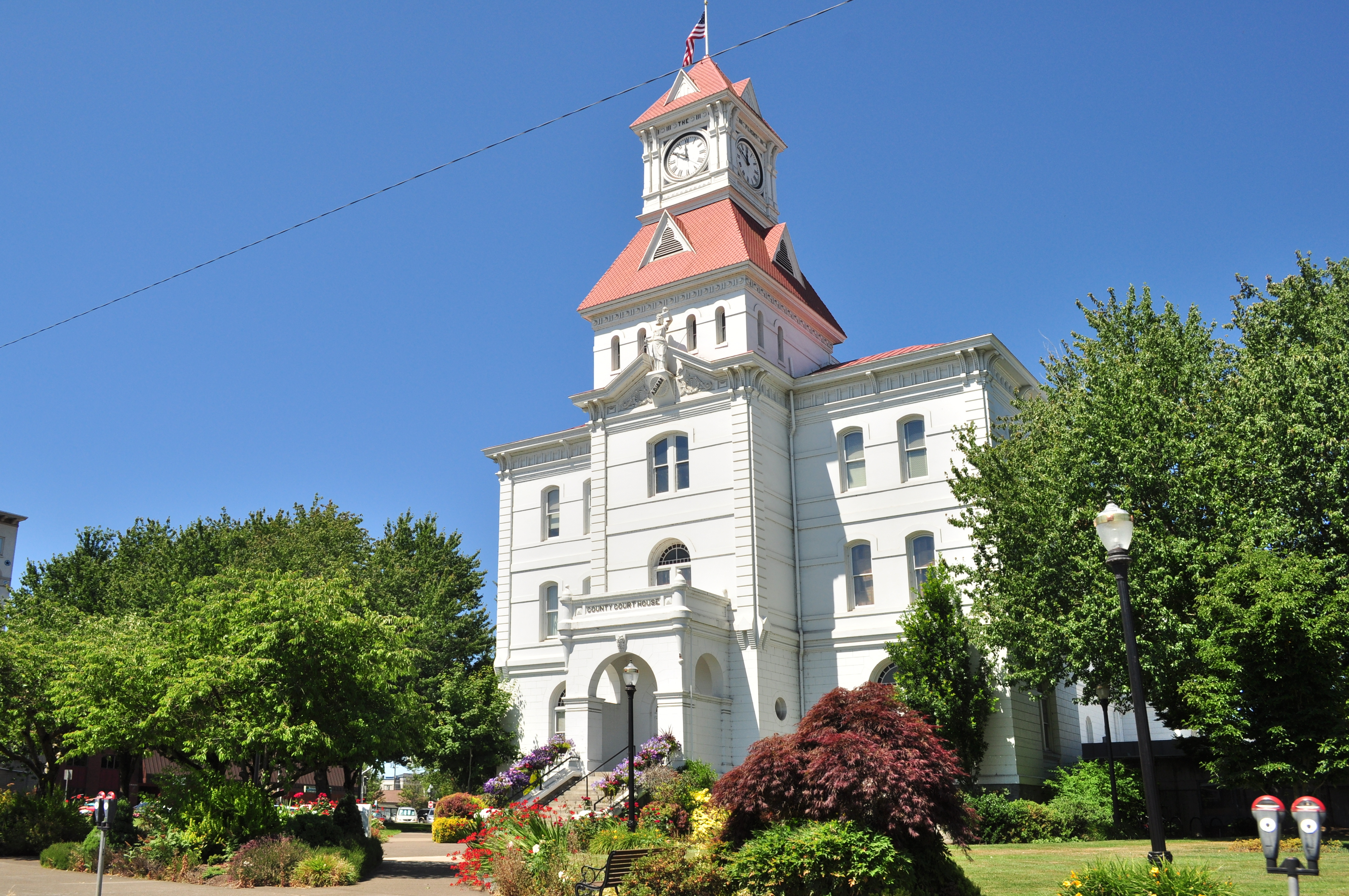
- Benton County Courthouse in Corvallis

- Location within the U.S. state of Oregon
- Coordinates: 44°29′25″N 123°25′57″W
- Country: United States
- State: Oregon
- Founded: December 23, 1847
- Named for: Thomas H. Benton
- Seat: Corvallis
- Largest city: Corvallis

Area
  - Total: 679 sq mi (1,760 km^{2})
  - Land: 676 sq mi (1,750 km^{2})
  - Water: 2.7 sq mi (7.0 km^{2}) 0.4%

Population (2020)
  - Total: 95,184
  - Estimate (2025): 97,728 ▲
  - Density: 127/sq mi (49/km^{2})
- Time zone: UTC−8 (Pacific)
  - Summer (DST): UTC−7 (PDT)
- Congressional district: 4th
- Website: www.bentoncountyor.gov

Map of Benton County

Benton County is one of the 36 counties in the U.S. state of Oregon. As of the 2020 census, the population was 95,184. Its county seat is Corvallis. The county was named after Thomas Hart Benton, a U.S. Senator who advocated American control over the Oregon Country. Benton County is designated as the Corvallis, OR Metropolitan Statistical Area, which is included in the Portland–Vancouver–Salem, OR–WA Combined Statistical Area. It is in the Willamette Valley.

== History ==
Benton County was created on December 23, 1847, by an act of the Provisional Government of Oregon. The county was named after Democratic Senator Thomas Hart Benton of Missouri, an advocate of the doctrine of Manifest Destiny and the belief that the American government should control the whole of the Oregon Country. At the time of its formation the county included all the country west of the Willamette River, south of Polk County and running all the way to the California border in the south and the Pacific Ocean in the west.

The county was created out of lands originally inhabited by the Klickitat, who rented it from the Kalapuyas for use as hunting grounds. All aboriginal claims to land within Benton County were ceded in the Treaty of Dayton in 1855. Portions of Benton County were taken to form Coos, Curry, Douglas, Jackson, Josephine, Lane and Lincoln Counties, leaving Benton County in its present form.

The city of Marysville, later renamed Corvallis, was made the county seat in 1851. The city briefly was the capital of Oregon. In 1862 Corvallis became the site of the Oregon State Agricultural College, known today as Oregon State University.

== Geography ==
According to the United States Census Bureau, the county has a total area of 679 square miles (1,760 km^{2}), of which 676 square miles (1,750 km^{2}) is land and 2.7 square miles (7.0 km^{2}) (0.4%) is water. It is the fourth-smallest county in Oregon by land area and third-smallest by total area.

=== Adjacent counties ===
- Polk County (north)
- Lincoln County (west)
- Linn County (east)
- Lane County (south)

=== National protected areas ===
- Siuslaw National Forest (part)
- William L. Finley National Wildlife Refuge

== Demographics ==
Historical population
Census	Pop.	Note	%±
1850	814		—
1860	3,074		277.6%
1870	4,584		49.1%
1880	6,403		39.7%
1890	8,650		35.1%
1900	6,706		−22.5%
1910	10,663		59.0%
1920	13,744		28.9%
1930	16,555		20.5%
1940	18,629		12.5%
1950	31,570		69.5%
1960	39,165		24.1%
1970	53,776		37.3%
1980	68,211		26.8%
1990	70,811		3.8%
2000	78,153		10.4%
2010	85,579		9.5%
2020	95,184		11.2%
2025 (est.)	97,728	▲	2.7%
U.S. Decennial Census; 1790–1960 1900–1990; 1990–2000 2010–2020

=== 2020 census ===
Benton County, Oregon – Racial and ethnic composition Note: the US Census treats Hispanic/Latino as an ethnic category. This table excludes Latinos from the racial categories and assigns them to a separate category. Hispanics/Latinos may be of any race.
Race / Ethnicity (NH = Non-Hispanic)	Pop 1980	Pop 1990	Pop 2000	Pop 2010	Pop 2020	% 1980	% 1990	% 2000	% 2010	% 2020
White alone (NH)	63,913	64,103	67,816	71,552	72,209	93.70%	90.53%	86.77%	83.61%	75.86%
Black or African American alone (NH)	435	580	637	715	938	0.64%	0.82%	0.82%	0.84%	0.99%
Native American or Alaska Native alone (NH)	380	501	556	493	528	0.56%	0.71%	0.71%	0.58%	0.55%
Asian alone (NH)	1,705	3,845	3,493	4,404	6,375	2.50%	5.43%	4.47%	5.15%	6.70%
Native Hawaiian or Pacific Islander alone (NH)	x	x	175	199	276	x	x	0.22%	0.23%	0.29%
Other race alone (NH)	555	47	173	156	538	0.81%	0.07%	0.22%	0.18%	0.57%
Mixed race or Multiracial (NH)	x	x	1,658	2,593	5,796	x	x	2.12%	3.03%	6.09%
Hispanic or Latino (any race)	1,223	1,735	3,645	5,467	8,524	1.79%	2.45%	4.66%	6.39%	8.96%
Total	68,211	70,811	78,153	85,579	95,184	100.00%	100.00%	100.00%	100.00%	100.00%

=== American Community Survey 2025 data ===
The United States Census Bureau estimated that in 2025, Benton County’s population was 97.728. It was also estimated that the county's population was 76,21% Non-Hispanic White, 10,30% Hispanic or Latino, 1,29% Non-Hispanic Black, 6,36% Asian, 0,57% Native American, 0,32% Pacific Islander, and 4,94% Multiracial.

Total	Population	Percentage
Non-Hispanic White	74.481	76,21%
Hispanic or Latino	10.069	10,30%
Non-Hispanic Black	1.263	1,29%
Asian	6.213	6,36%
Native American	560	0,57%
Pacific Islander	316	0,32%
Non-Hispanic Multiracial	4.826	4,94%

As of the 2020 census, the county had a population of 95,184. Of the residents, 16.3% were under the age of 18 and 17.1% were 65 years of age or older; the median age was 33.2 years. For every 100 females there were 99.9 males, and for every 100 females age 18 and over there were 99.0 males. 80.6% of residents lived in urban areas and 19.4% lived in rural areas.

The racial makeup of the county was 78.4% White, 1.1% Black or African American, 0.9% American Indian and Alaska Native, 6.8% Asian, 0.3% Native Hawaiian and Pacific Islander, 3.3% from some other race, and 9.3% from two or more races. Hispanic or Latino residents of any race comprised 9.0% of the population, and 75.9% were non-Hispanic white according to the same redistricting data.

There were 37,447 households in the county, of which 22.8% had children under the age of 18 living with them and 26.5% had a female householder with no spouse or partner present. About 28.5% of all households were made up of individuals and 10.6% had someone living alone who was 65 years of age or older.

There were 40,150 housing units, of which 6.7% were vacant. Among occupied housing units, 54.0% were owner-occupied and 46.0% were renter-occupied. The homeowner vacancy rate was 0.9% and the rental vacancy rate was 7.0%.

=== 2010 census ===
As of the 2010 census, there were 85,579 people, 34,317 households, and 19,256 families residing in the county. The population density was 126.6 inhabitants per square mile (48.9 inhabitants/km^{2}). There were 36,245 housing units at an average density of 53.6 units per square mile (20.7 units/km^{2}). The racial makeup of the county was 87.1% white, 5.2% Asian, 0.9% black or African American, 0.7% American Indian, 0.2% Pacific islander, 2.3% from other races, and 3.6% from two or more races. Those of Hispanic or Latino origin made up 6.4% of the population. In terms of ethnicity, 22.6% reported German ancestry, 16.1% English, 13.5% Irish, and 3.6% were American heritage.

Of the 34,317 households, 24.2% had children under the age of 18 living with them, 45.3% were married couples living together, 7.3% had a female householder with no husband present, 43.9% were non-families, and 28.2% of all households were made up of individuals. The average household size was 2.35 and the average family size was 2.87. The median age was 32.1 years.

The median income for a household in the county was $48,012 and the median income for a family was $71,763. Males had a median income of $50,282 versus $35,387 for females. The per capita income for the county was $26,177. About 7.7% of families and 19.1% of the population were below the poverty line, including 13.6% of those under age 18 and 5.5% of those age 65 or over.

=== 2000 census ===
As of the 2000 census, there were 78,153 people, 30,145 households, and 18,237 families residing in the county. The population density was 116 people per square mile (45 people/km^{2}). There were 31,980 housing units at an average density of 47 units per square mile (18/km^{2}). The racial makeup of the county was 89.16% White, 0.84% Black or African American, 0.79% Native American, 4.49% Asian, 0.24% Pacific Islander, 1.92% from other races, and 2.56% from two or more races. 4.66% of the population were Hispanic or Latino of any race. 18.2% were of German, 11.6% English, 8.9% Irish and 7.0% American ancestry. 91.1% spoke English, 4.1% Spanish and 1.0% Chinese as their first language.

There were 30,145 households, out of which 28.40% had children under the age of 18 living with them, 50.40% were married couples living together, 7.20% had a female householder with no husband present, and 39.50% were non-families. 26.10% of all households were made up of individuals, and 6.70% had someone living alone who was 65 years of age or older. The average household size was 2.43 and the average family size was 2.95.

In the county, 21.30% of the population was under the age of 18, 20.20% was from 18 to 24, 26.70% from 25 to 44, 21.40% from 45 to 64, and 10.30% was 65 years of age or older. The median age was 31 years. For every 100 females there were 99.10 males. For every 100 females age 18 and over, there were 97.80 males.

The median income for a household in the county was $41,897, and the median income for a family was $56,319. Males had a median income of $42,018 versus $29,795 for females. The per capita income for the county was $21,868. About 6.80% of families and 14.60% of the population were below the poverty line, including 10.60% of those under age 18 and 4.90% of those age 65 or over.

Benton County has the lowest church attendance per capita of any county in the nation (25% attendance).

== Communities ==
=== Cities ===
- Adair Village
- Albany (part)
- Corvallis (county seat)
- Monroe
- Philomath

=== Census-designated places ===
- Alpine
- Alsea
- Bellfountain
- Blodgett
- Kings Valley
- Summit

=== Unincorporated communities ===
- Dawson
- Dry Creek
- Glenbrook
- Greenberry
- Hoskins
- Lewisburg
- Wren

== Politics and government ==
For a long time, Benton County strongly favored the Republican Party due to its significant Yankee influence. In the 1932 presidential election, it was the only county in the state to vote for Herbert Hoover instead of FDR. Along with Riverside County in California, it was one of only two counties in the Pacific States to be held by Hoover that year. As late as 1960, Benton was the most Republican county in the traditionally Republican state of Oregon, which at that point had never supported a Democrat other than FDR for president, except for 1912 when the Republican Party was divided and a very narrow victory in 1868. Up to 1984, Benton County had voted for a Democratic presidential candidate only four times, in the above-mentioned 1868 election plus the national Democratic landslides of 1912, 1936, and 1964. In 1964, Lyndon Johnson became the first Democrat to win an absolute majority of the county's vote since Horatio Seymour.

The Republican edge in the county narrowed from the 1970s onward, culminating when it swung from a five-point victory for Ronald Reagan in 1984 to a nine-point victory for Michael Dukakis in 1988. Since then, Benton County has become a strongly Democratic county, and is usually the second-strongest Democratic bastion in the state, behind only Multnomah County (Portland). This is largely due to the leanings of Oregon State's student body and staff, closely tracking with Democratic gains in other counties influenced by college towns. No Republican has come within nine percentage points of carrying Benton County since 1988, and Barack Obama, Hillary Clinton, Joe Biden, and Kamala Harris have won the county by over thirty percentage points during each of the last five presidential elections. Overall, Benton County is a reliable state bellwether, having voted for Oregon's statewide winner in every presidential election since 1948, along with Hood River County.

Since 1972, Benton County has been a home rule county, meaning that the citizens have full control over the county charter, rather than using a standard charter issued by the state. The voters have chosen to eliminate the traditional elected county offices of Assessor, Treasurer, Surveyor, Justice of the Peace, and Clerk. Currently, they only elect three County Commissioners and a Sheriff.

The three current Benton County Commissioners are Chair Pat Malone, Xanthippe Augerot, and Nancy Wyse. They are all members of the Democratic Party and have served since 2019, 2017, and 2021; respectively. Wyse and Augerot's current terms expire in January 2025, while Malone's is up in January 2023.

The current Benton County Sheriff is Jef Van Arsdall. He was appointed to the office in March 2021 to fill the remainder of the term of retiring sheriff Scott Jackson.

Benton County is currently one of 11 counties in Oregon in which therapeutic psilocybin is legal.

United States presidential election results for Benton County, Oregon
Year	Republican		Democratic		Third party(ies)	
Year	No.	%	No.	%	No.	%
1904	1,107	62.51%	442	24.96%	222	12.54%
1908	1,183	55.99%	773	36.58%	157	7.43%
1912	715	27.43%	986	37.82%	906	34.75%
1916	2,902	50.72%	2,488	43.48%	332	5.80%
1920	3,752	66.25%	1,719	30.35%	192	3.39%
1924	3,417	60.68%	1,579	28.04%	635	11.28%
1928	4,605	75.55%	1,412	23.17%	78	1.28%
1932	4,068	54.73%	3,121	41.99%	244	3.28%
1936	3,390	45.67%	3,547	47.78%	486	6.55%
1940	5,089	62.99%	2,942	36.42%	48	0.59%
1944	5,242	64.39%	2,830	34.76%	69	0.85%
1948	6,839	66.21%	3,135	30.35%	355	3.44%
1952	9,229	75.27%	2,966	24.19%	67	0.55%
1956	9,016	68.15%	4,214	31.85%	0	0.00%
1960	9,734	64.36%	5,391	35.64%	0	0.00%
1964	7,250	43.98%	8,971	54.42%	265	1.61%
1968	11,654	61.29%	6,538	34.38%	824	4.33%
1972	14,906	56.34%	10,842	40.98%	708	2.68%
1976	15,555	53.08%	11,887	40.56%	1,865	6.36%
1980	14,982	43.42%	13,150	38.11%	6,375	18.47%
1984	17,836	52.36%	16,073	47.19%	153	0.45%
1988	14,004	44.30%	16,930	53.56%	676	2.14%
1992	11,550	30.46%	17,966	47.37%	8,407	22.17%
1996	12,450	36.09%	17,211	49.89%	4,839	14.03%
2000	15,825	41.40%	19,444	50.87%	2,957	7.74%
2004	18,460	40.36%	26,515	57.98%	760	1.66%
2008	15,264	32.84%	29,901	64.33%	1,313	2.82%
2012	14,991	33.46%	27,776	62.00%	2,035	4.54%
2016	13,445	27.58%	29,193	59.88%	6,115	12.54%
2020	14,878	28.18%	35,827	67.86%	2,094	3.97%
2024	14,187	28.24%	33,909	67.50%	2,136	4.25%

== Economy ==
Along with Oregon State University, agriculture, lumber, wood products, and some printing technology research and development form the economic base of the county. A substantial portion of the nation's research in forestry, agriculture, engineering, education and the sciences takes place at OSU.

== Education ==
School districts include:

- Alsea School District 7J
- Central School District 13J
- Corvallis School District 509J
- Greater Albany School District 8J
- Harrisburg School District 7J
- Monroe School District 1J
- Philomath School District 17J

Most of Benton County is in the district of the Linn-Benton Community College. A piece to the southwest is in the boundary of Lane Community College.

== See also ==
- National Register of Historic Places listings in Benton County, Oregon
