= Oregon Route 229 =

State highway in Lincoln County, Oregon, US

Oregon Route 229
- Siletz Highway No. 181
- Route 229 highlighted in red

Route information
- Maintained by ODOT
- Length: 31.21 mi (50.23 km)
- Existed: 1935–present

Major junctions
- South end: US 20 in Toledo
- North end: US 101 in Kernville

Location
- Country: United States
- State: Oregon
- County: Lincoln

Highway system
- Oregon Highways; Interstate; US; State; Named; Scenic
← OR 228	→ OR 230

Oregon Route 229 is an Oregon state highway that runs along the lower reaches of the Siletz River, on the central Oregon coast. The highway is also known as the Siletz Highway No. 181 (see Oregon highways and routes).

== Route description ==
Oregon Route 229 begins at a junction with U.S. Route 20 and U.S. Route 20 Business, north of the city of Toledo. It heads north from there, past Olalla Reservoir, meeting the Siletz River in the town of Siletz. From there, it continues north, generally following the course of the river downstream (and crossing it several times), eventually turning west and heading towards the Pacific Ocean. Close to the end of the road is the historic town of Kernville; shortly after, OR 229 ends at an intersection with U.S. Route 101, located between Lincoln City and Gleneden Beach.

The route runs entirely within Lincoln County. Due to its close proximity to the Siletz River certain sections of the roadway have been constantly plagued with erosion problems, and sections of the road are frequently washed out in winter due to flooding. Because of these issues, the State has been trying to turn the Highway over to Lincoln County, however, the county has said they are not interested in taking over maintenance of the route unless the state fixes the problems with the road.

On December 12, 2025, a large landslide occurred on the highway around milepost 14, which is approximately halfway between the towns of Siletz and Kernville. The slide damaged 2 residences and officials said the landslide could keep Oregon Route 229 closed for months. This landslide was a result of a large-scale rain event, known as an atmospheric river, which dropped several inches of rain on an already saturated landscape.

== Major intersections ==
The entire route is in Lincoln County.

Location	mi	km	Destinations	Notes
Toledo	0.00	0.00	US 20 – Newport, Corvallis	
Kernville	31.21	50.23	US 101 – Lincoln City, Depoe Bay, Newport, Tillamook	
1.000 mi = 1.609 km; 1.000 km = 0.621 mi
