= Kernville, Oregon =

Unincorporated community in the state of Oregon, United States

Coordinates: 44.89944°N 124.00333°W

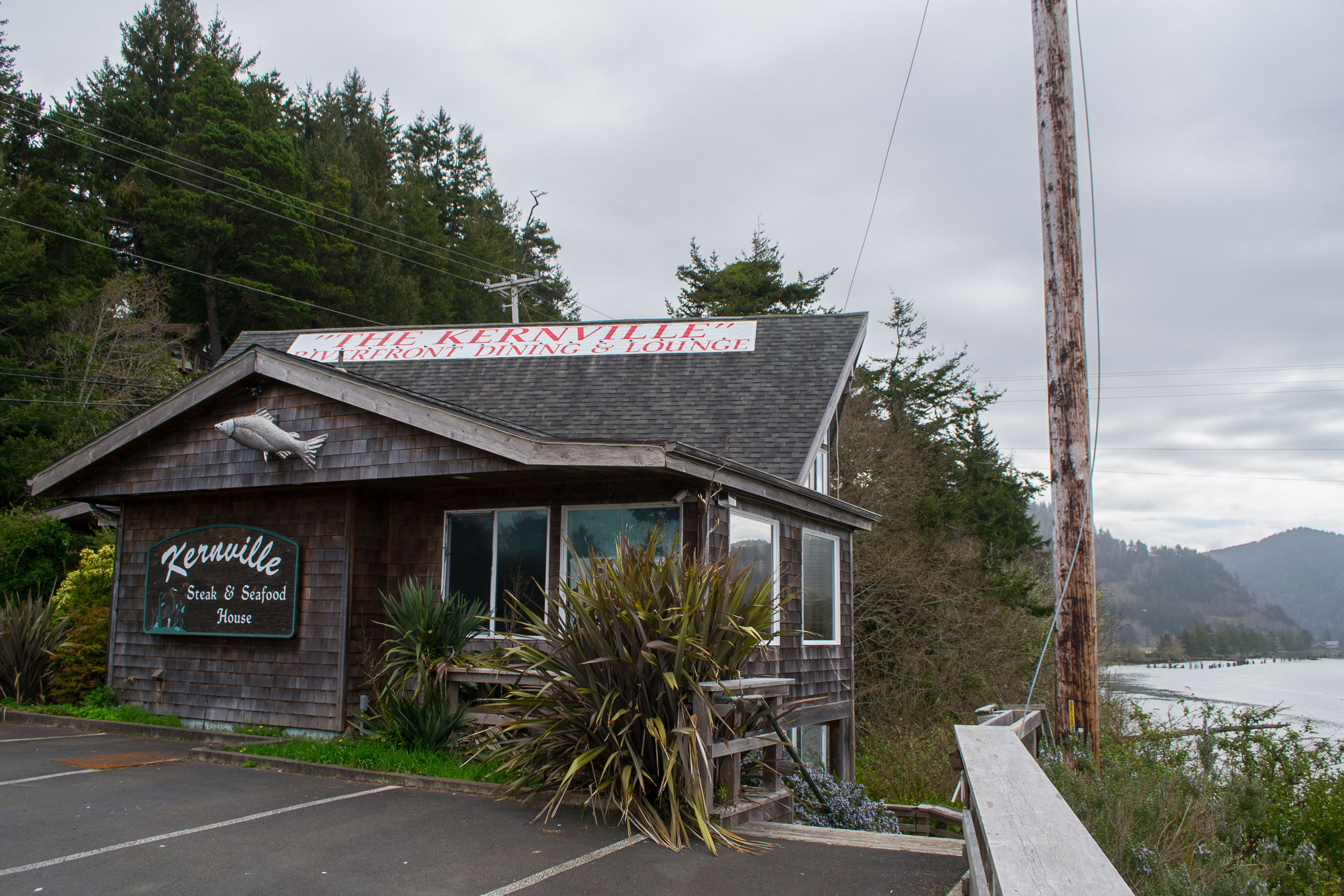
The Kernville Steak and Seafood House before burning down in 2014

Kernville is an unincorporated community in Lincoln County, Oregon, United States. It is located near the intersection of U.S. Route 101 and Oregon Route 229, where the Siletz River enters Siletz Bay. There are two communities, known as "old" and "new" Kernville, in close proximity. Old Kernville is considered a ghost town.

The "old" Kernville was the first European community in the area. It was started in 1896 by Daniel and John H. Kern, who operated a salmon cannery, Kern Brothers Packing Company, on the north bank of the Siletz River. At the time, the isolated location was only accessible by boat. In 1907 the cannery was sold and the new owners dismantled the building and rebuilt it on the south bank of the river. The sawmill, post office and original community of Kernville were also located on the more accessible south bank. Eventually the old town site, including what remained on the north side of the river, was abandoned. As of 1945, "new" Kernville was located about a mile downstream from its original location, near the old Oregon Coast Highway bridge. Since the rerouting of U.S. Route 101 and the completion of a new Siletz River Bridge in the 1980s, new Kernville is no longer on the main highway. Kernville post office ran intermittently from 1896-1968.

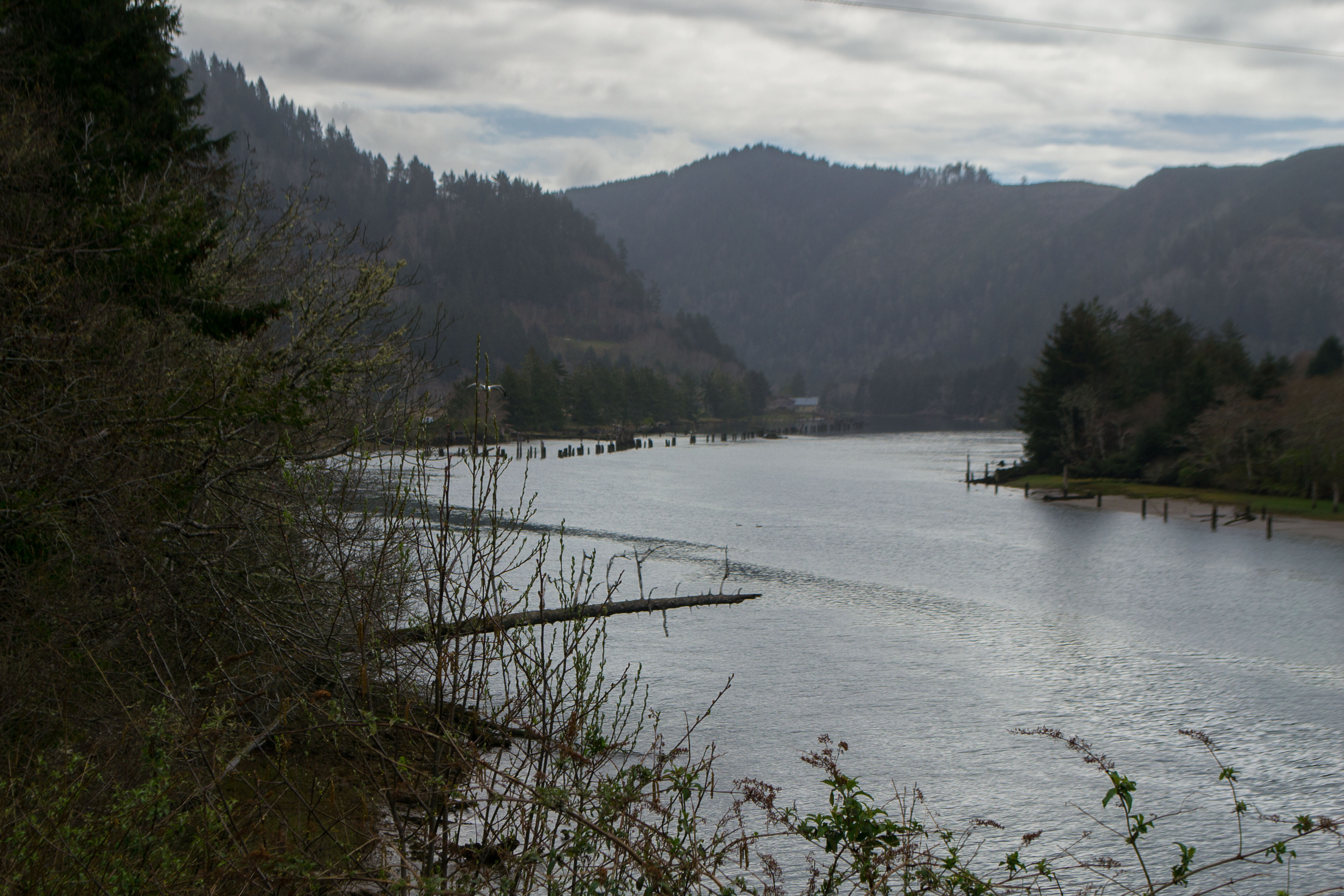
Former site of the Kern Brothers Packing Company in Kernville, Oregon

After the decline in the fishing industry that started in the 1920s, the Kernville economy was increasingly based on logging. For a time, Kernville was the site of an important spruce mill, and during World War I it supplied wood for the airplanes being built by the U.S. Army Spruce Production Division for the war effort. At this time Kernville was known as "Millport".

The 1971 film about a logging family in Oregon, Sometimes a Great Notion, based on the novel by Ken Kesey, was filmed in Kernville. A local Victorian house served as the set for the "Stamper House".

== See also ==
- List of ghost towns in Oregon
