= Lincoln Beach =

Lincoln Beach can refer to:

- Lincoln Beach, Oregon
- Lincoln Beach amusement park, a former amusement park in New Orleans, Louisiana
