= Gleneden Beach State Recreation Site =

State park in the U.S. state of Oregon

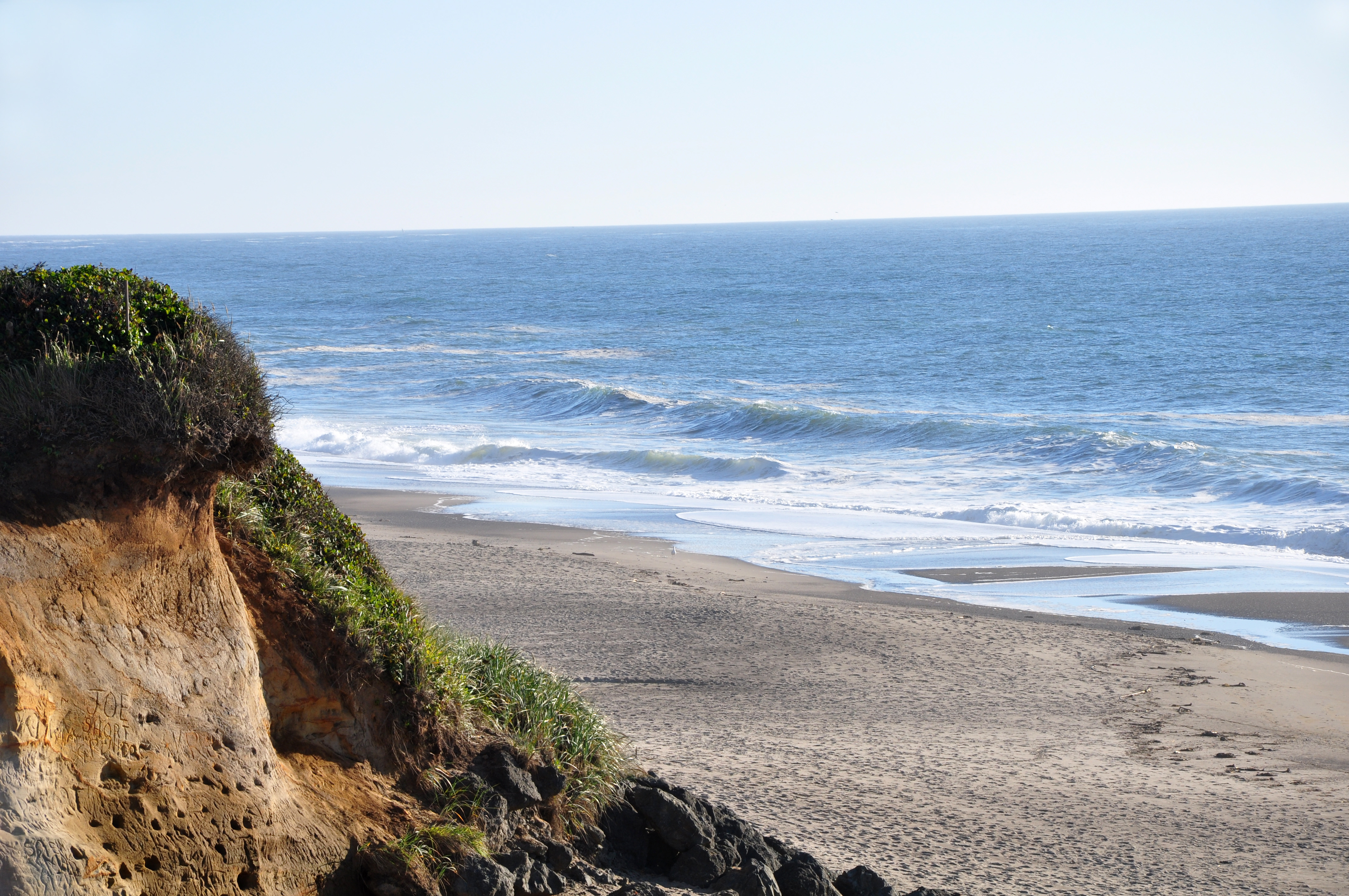
- Sandstone bluff, beach, Pacific Ocean

- Location within Oregon Location within the United States
- Type: Public, state
- Location: Lincoln County, Oregon
- Nearest city: Lincoln City
- Coordinates: 44°52′34″N 124°02′04″W
- Area: 17.5 acres (7.1 ha)
- Operator: Oregon Parks and Recreation Department
- Open: Year-round, Day use

Gleneden Beach State Recreation Site is a state park administered by the Oregon Parks and Recreation Department in the U.S. state of Oregon. Located along the Pacific Ocean 7 miles (11 km) south of Lincoln City, it offers public beach access, picnicking, and fishing in a setting of shore pines, sandstone bluffs, and sand. The park is fee-free.

Open year-round, the 17.5-acre (7.1 ha) park has picnic tables, a group picnic area, and restrooms. Road access is from U.S. Highway 101, which passes through the nearby community of Gleneden Beach. Picnic tables have been set up in the woods near the parking area and in a meadow above an ocean bluff. A path along the edge of the bluff offers views of the ocean; other paths lead down to the beach.

== See also ==
- List of Oregon state parks
