= Lincoln Beach, Oregon =

Unincorporated community in the state of Oregon, United States

- Census-designated place (CDP)
- Location of Lincoln Beach, Oregon
- Coordinates: 44°52′10″N 124°01′57″W
- Country: United States
- State: Oregon
- County: Lincoln

Area
  - Total: 4.12 sq mi (10.68 km^{2})
  - Land: 3.23 sq mi (8.37 km^{2})
  - Water: 0.89 sq mi (2.31 km^{2})
- Elevation: 62 ft (19 m)

Population (2020)
  - Total: 2,343
  - Density: 725.0/sq mi (279.93/km^{2})
- Time zone: UTC-8 (Pacific (PST))
  - Summer (DST): UTC-7 (PDT)
- ZIP code: 97341
- Area codes: 458 and 541
- FIPS code: 41-42550
- GNIS feature ID: 2408609

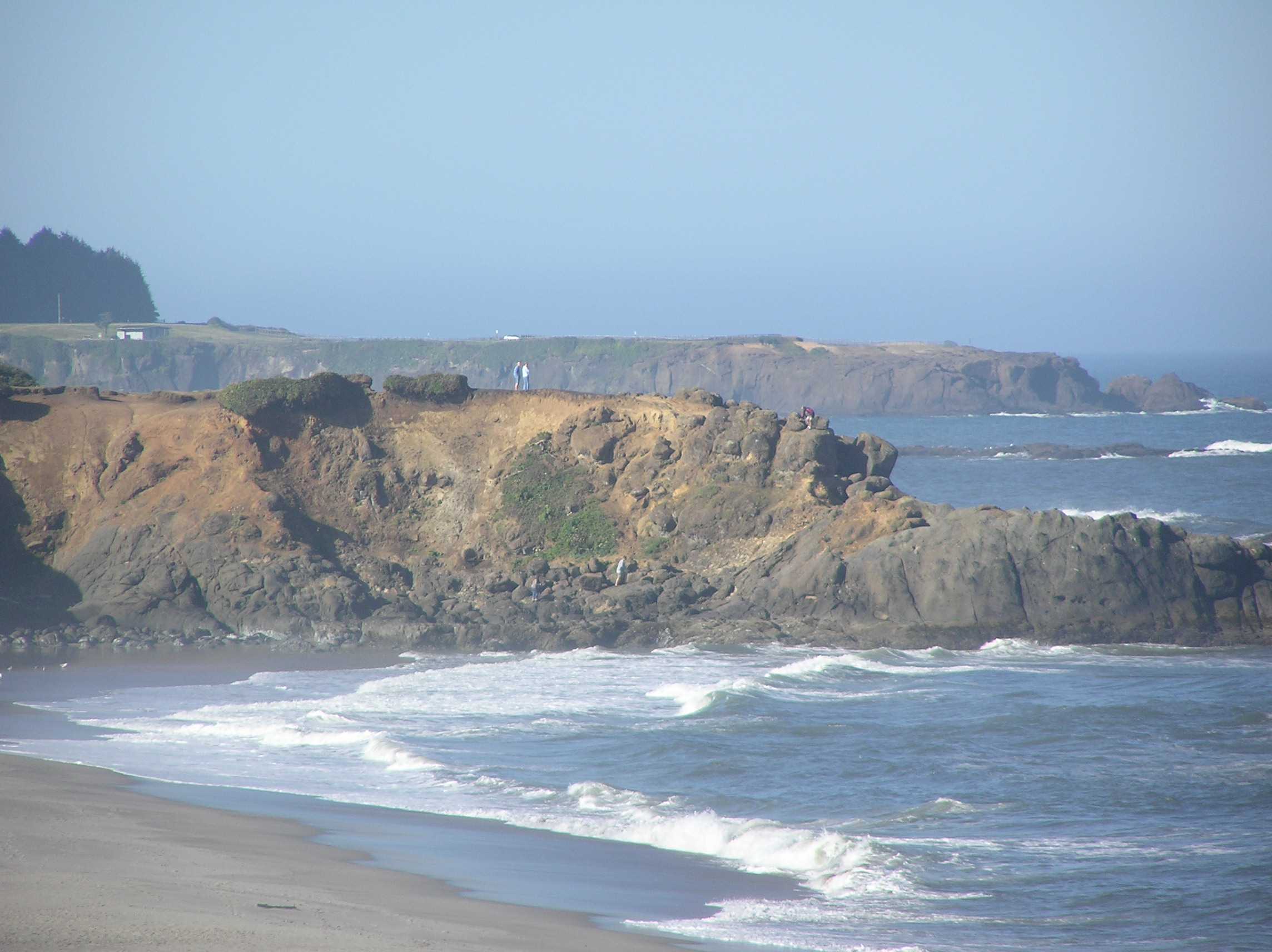
Fishing Rock with Rabbit Rock in background

Lincoln Beach is a census-designated place (CDP) in Lincoln County, Oregon, United States. It includes the unincorporated communities of Lincoln Beach and Gleneden Beach. As of the 2020 census, Lincoln Beach had a population of 2,343.

== Geography ==
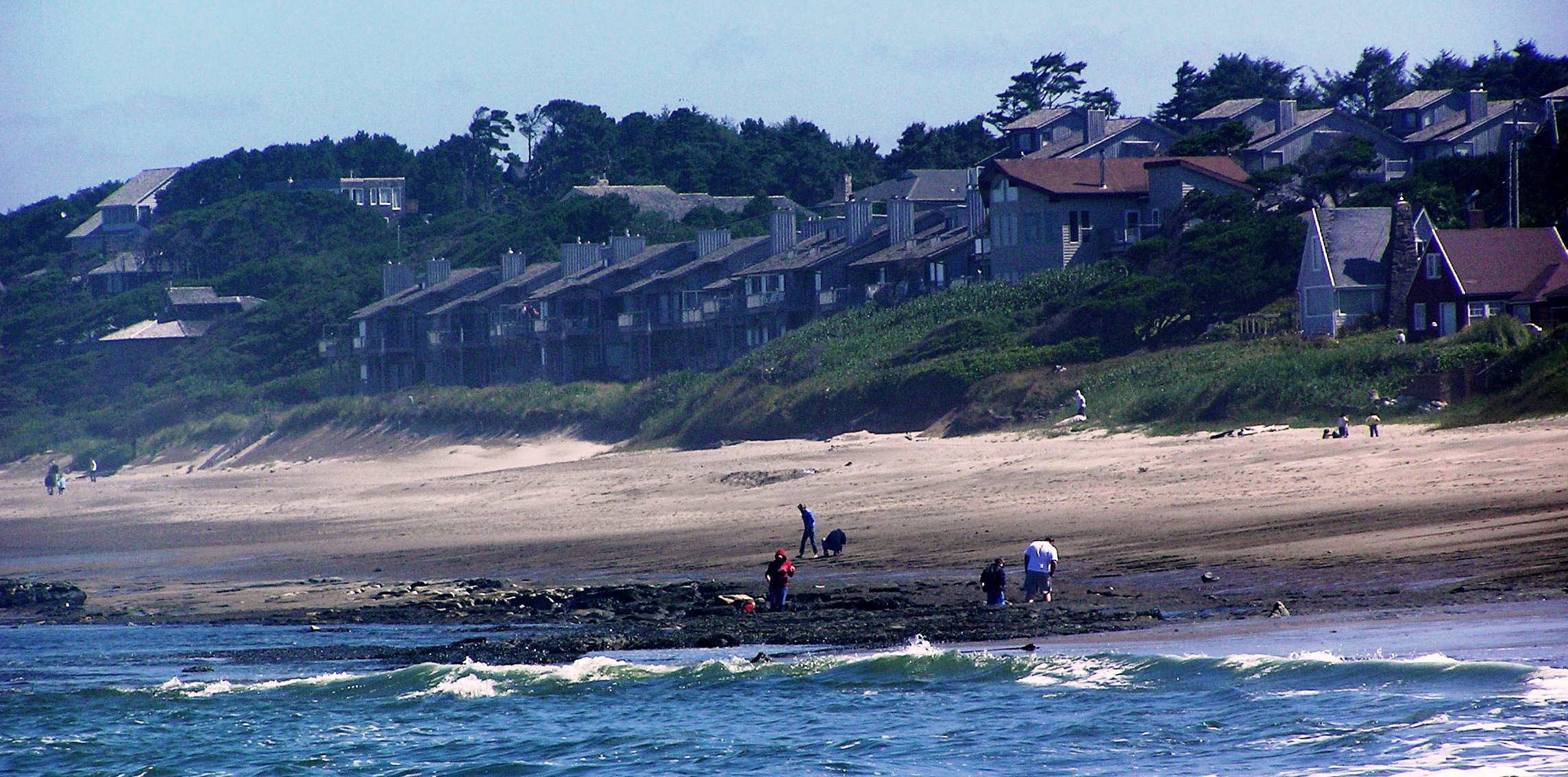
Lincoln Beach, Oregon - beach homes and beachcombers

Lincoln Beach is located in northwestern Lincoln County between Lincoln City to the north and Depoe Bay to the south. It is bordered to the west by the Pacific Ocean. Lincoln Beach proper is in the southern part of the CDP while Gleneden Beach is in the northern part of the CDP. U.S. Route 101 runs through the CDP, leading north 8 miles (13 km) to the center of Lincoln City and south 17 miles (27 km) to Newport, the Lincoln county seat.

According to the United States Census Bureau, the CDP has a total area of 4.1 square miles (10.7 km^{2}), of which 3.2 square miles (8.4 km^{2}) are land and 0.89 square miles (2.3 km^{2}), or 21.6%, are water.

== Demographics ==
Historical population
Census	Pop.	Note	%±
2020	2,343		—
U.S. Decennial Census

As of the census of 2000, there were 2,078 people, 1,073 households, and 657 families residing in the CDP. The population density was 632.5 inhabitants per square mile (244.2/km^{2}). There were 2,198 housing units at an average density of 669.1 per square mile (258.3/km^{2}). The racial makeup of the CDP was 95.52% White, 0.10% African American, 1.40% Native American, 0.77% Asian, 0.05% Pacific Islander, 0.82% from other races, and 1.35% from two or more races. Hispanic or Latino of any race were 2.02% of the population.

There were 1,073 households, out of which 10.9% had children under the age of 18 living with them, 53.0% were married couples living together, 6.1% had a female householder with no husband present, and 38.7% were non-families. 32.1% of all households were made up of individuals, and 16.0% had someone living alone who was 65 years of age or older. The average household size was 1.93 and the average family size was 2.35.

In the CDP, the population was spread out, with 10.9% under the age of 18, 3.3% from 18 to 24, 16.0% from 25 to 44, 33.8% from 45 to 64, and 36.1% who were 65 years of age or older. The median age was 58 years. For every 100 females, there were 85.2 males. For every 100 females age 18 and over, there were 82.5 males.

The median income for a household in the CDP was $33,425, and the median income for a family was $41,415. Males had a median income of $32,557 versus $18,519 for females. The per capita income for the CDP was $21,810. About 4.0% of families and 6.9% of the population were below the poverty line, including 3.0% of those under age 18 and 2.2% of those age 65 or over.

== Education ==
There is one school district in the county, the Lincoln County School District.

The county is in the Oregon Coast Community College district.
