= Bayshore, Oregon =

- Census-designated place
- Location within Oregon Location within the United States
- Coordinates: 44°26′27″N 124°04′51″W
- Country: United States
- State: Oregon
- County: Lincoln

Area
  - Total: 2.47 sq mi (6.39 km^{2})
  - Land: 1.39 sq mi (3.61 km^{2})
  - Water: 1.07 sq mi (2.78 km^{2})
- Elevation: 26 ft (7.9 m)

Population (2020)
  - Total: 952
  - Density: 682.6/sq mi (263.56/km^{2})
- Time zone: UTC-8 (Pacific (PST))
  - Summer (DST): UTC-7 (PDT)
- ZIP Code: 97394 (Waldport)
- Area codes: 541/458
- FIPS code: 41-04850
- GNIS feature ID: 2812889

Bayshore is an unincorporated community and census-designated place (CDP) in Lincoln County, Oregon, United States. It was first listed as a CDP prior to the 2020 census. As of the 2020 census, Bayshore had a population of 952.

The CDP is in southern Lincoln County, bordered to the south by Alsea Bay and to the west by the Pacific Ocean. The city of Waldport is to the south across Alsea Bay. U.S. Route 101 passes through Bayshore, leading north 14 miles (23 km) to Newport, the Lincoln county seat, and south through Waldport 10 miles (16 km) to Yachats.

== Demographics ==
Historical population
Census	Pop.	Note	%±
2020	952		—
U.S. Decennial Census
