= Mo's Restaurants =

US restaurant chain located on the Oregon Coast

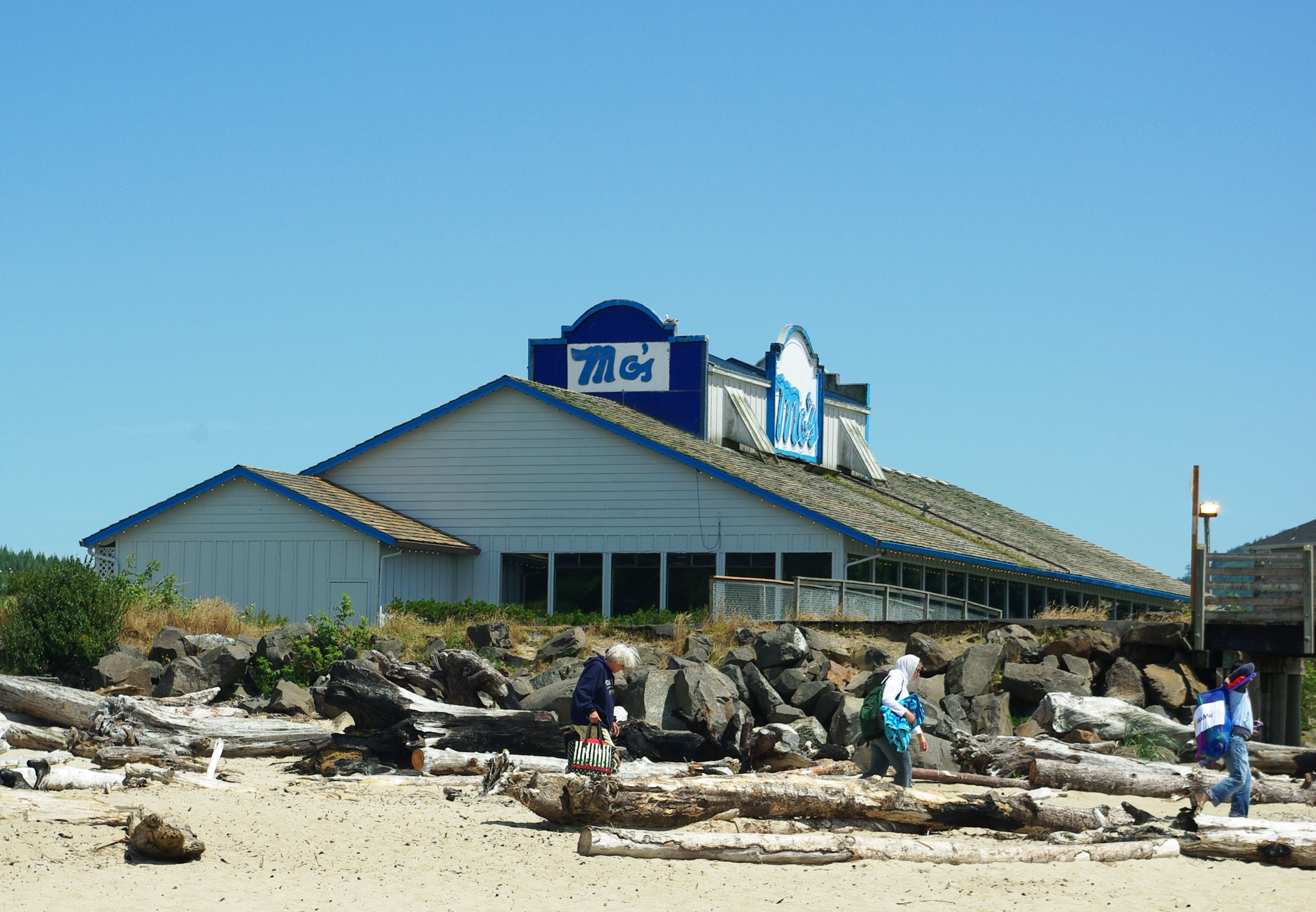
Mo's in Lincoln City, Oregon

Mo's Restaurants is an American restaurant chain located on the Oregon Coast and headquartered in Newport, Oregon. Mo's are named after their original owner Mohava "Mo" Niemi, who was once described as "the stuff of legend in Newport".

Mo's restaurants serve primarily seafood and have long been noted for their New England–style clam chowder, their own locally raised Yaquina Bay oysters and for their casual and friendly atmosphere.

== History ==
Mo's first opened on the Newport bay front in 1946 as "Freddie & Mo's"—a 24-hour restaurant that served the local loggers and fisherman such fare as spaghetti and steaks. Niemi's business partner Freddie Kent became ill a few years later and Niemi bought out her partner's shares of the restaurant. In the following years Mo's served more and more seafood, the clam chowder recipe evolved over time as the cooks would vie with each other to produce a better version.

Over time Mo's would become a favorite, not just of locals, but of tourists and celebrities as well. Mo's second husband, retired fisherman Kaino "Dutch" Niemi along with friends often gathered at a table contributing to the "family" atmosphere of the restaurant.

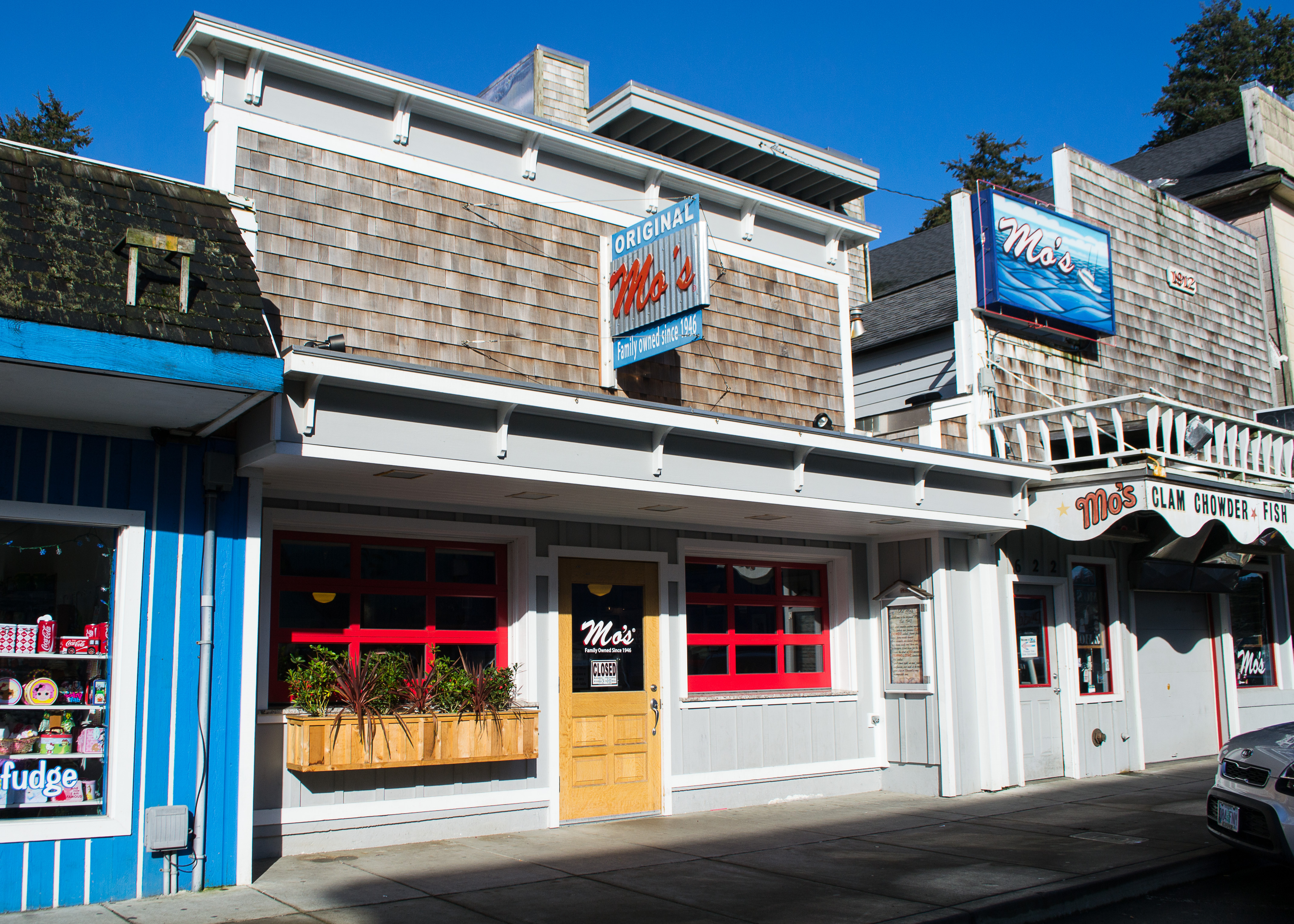
The original Mo's in Newport, Oregon

Great-granddaughter of Mo, Gabrielle McEntee-Wilson recalls in an interview "Granny Mo" saying (in regards to Mo's popularity) "The hippies discovered Mo's" during the 'sixties." According to McEntee-Wilson "It (Mo's) wasn't a concept—it grew on its own and changed over time."

Henry Fonda, Paul Newman and other cast members of the film Sometimes a Great Notion (based on a novel by Ken Kesey about a dysfunctional family of Oregon coast loggers) ate there during location filming. Mo appears in one scene of the film as an extra. The scene was filmed in Newport's Bayhaven Inn, (renamed The Snag in the film). Mo and her father once owned the Inn in the early 1940s.

Mo opening the garage door.

Oregon Governor Tom McCall and Senator Mark Hatfield and other Oregon politicians ate there as well. In 1973 Audrey McCall, wife of the Governor, arranged for the spouses of the Governors attending the Western Governors' Conference to have lunch at Mo's on the waterfront.

Senator Robert F. Kennedy and his wife Ethel also visited the restaurant while he was campaigning for the Democratic Party 1968 Oregon primary election on May 24, 1968.

The original Newport Mo's has an unusual front wall for a restaurant. One day a customer accidentally left her car in forward gear instead of reverse while leaving and crashed through the front wall. Mo saw the humor in the situation, and consoled the distraught woman, saying, "Well, we'll just put in a garage door so we can open it and you can drive in anytime if that's what you want to do". On warm sunny days the door is opened transforming Mo's into a sidewalk cafe. The door itself, pictured at right, remains basically unchanged since its installation and features a picture on its interior showing a woman driving her car through the door, an alarmed look on her face.

== Expansion ==
Over the years Niemi opened additional Mo's restaurants, one across the street from the original in Newport overlooking the bay (Mo's Annex) and Mo's West at Otter Rock. The original Mo's was also remodeled and expanded several times, in addition to the restaurant the building now houses a clam chowder factory which provides the base for the restaurants. It is also sold online and is distributed to grocery stores in 14 states. Over the course of a year, the factory will make over 500,000 pounds of fresh chowder. The factory will process one ton of bacon a week and one ton of potatoes per day.

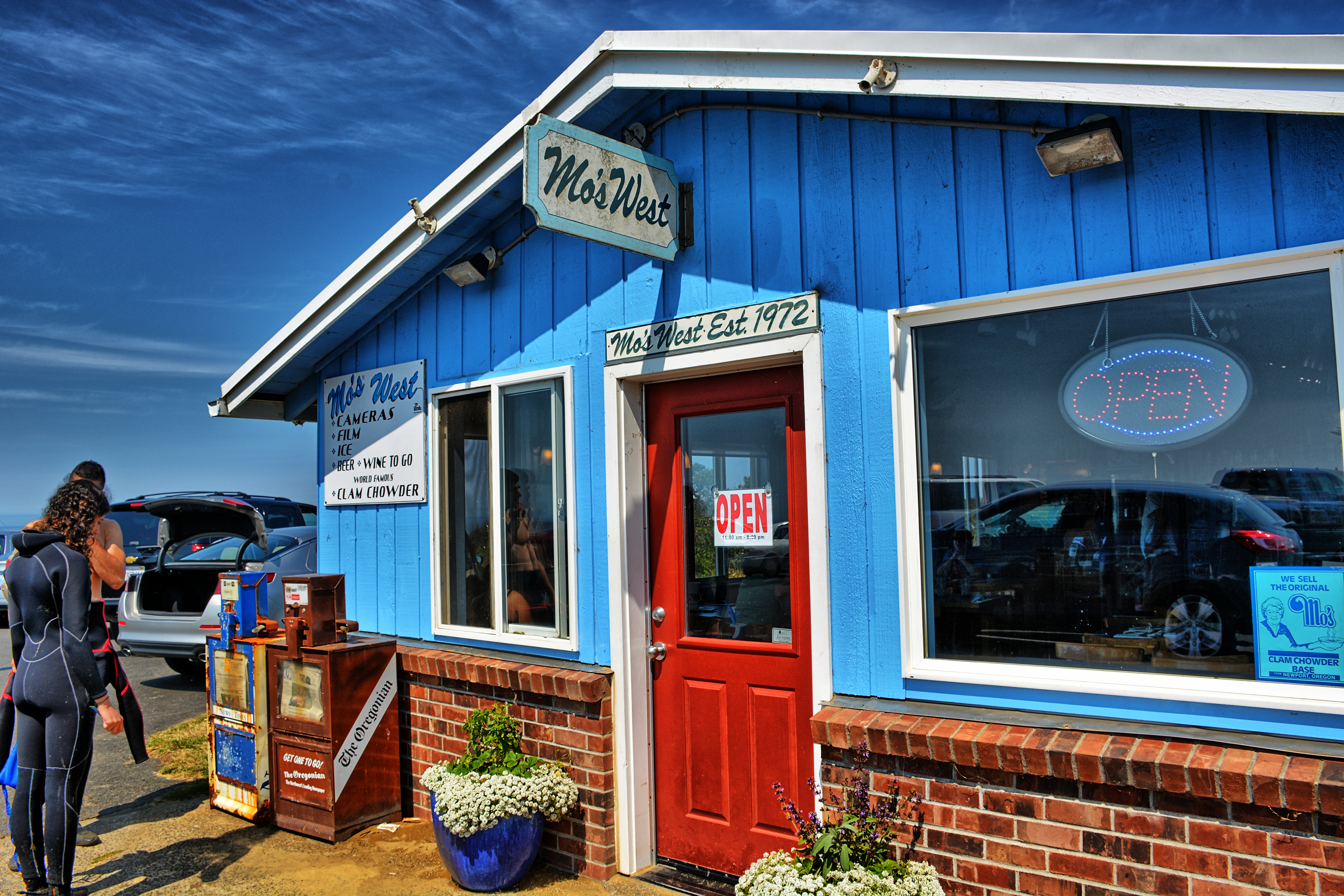
Mo's in Otter Rock, Oregon

The original restaurants in Newport and Otter Rock are family owned and operate as Mo's Enterprises. In 1970 Mo partnered with another Newport business owner, Tom Becker, to purchase an oyster farm and formed a company that would become known as Newport Pacific Corporation. This company now owns and operates additional Mo's in Astoria, Seaside, Florence, Lincoln City, Cannon Beach, and in the Portland International Airport. Mo Niemi died in 1992 at the age of 79. Several of Niemi's surviving family serve on the board of directors of Newport Pacific.

== Recognition ==
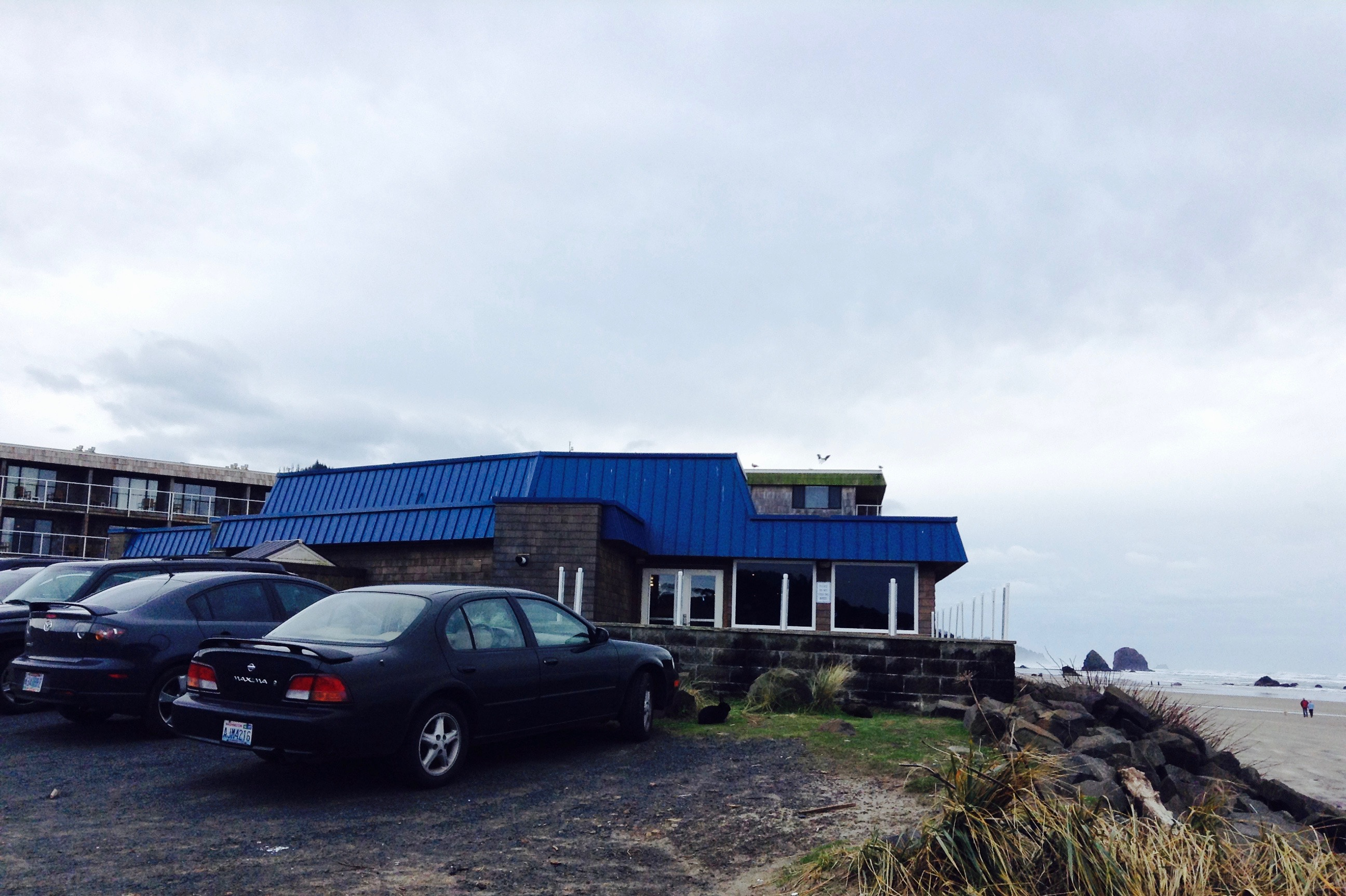
Mo's in Cannon Beach, Oregon

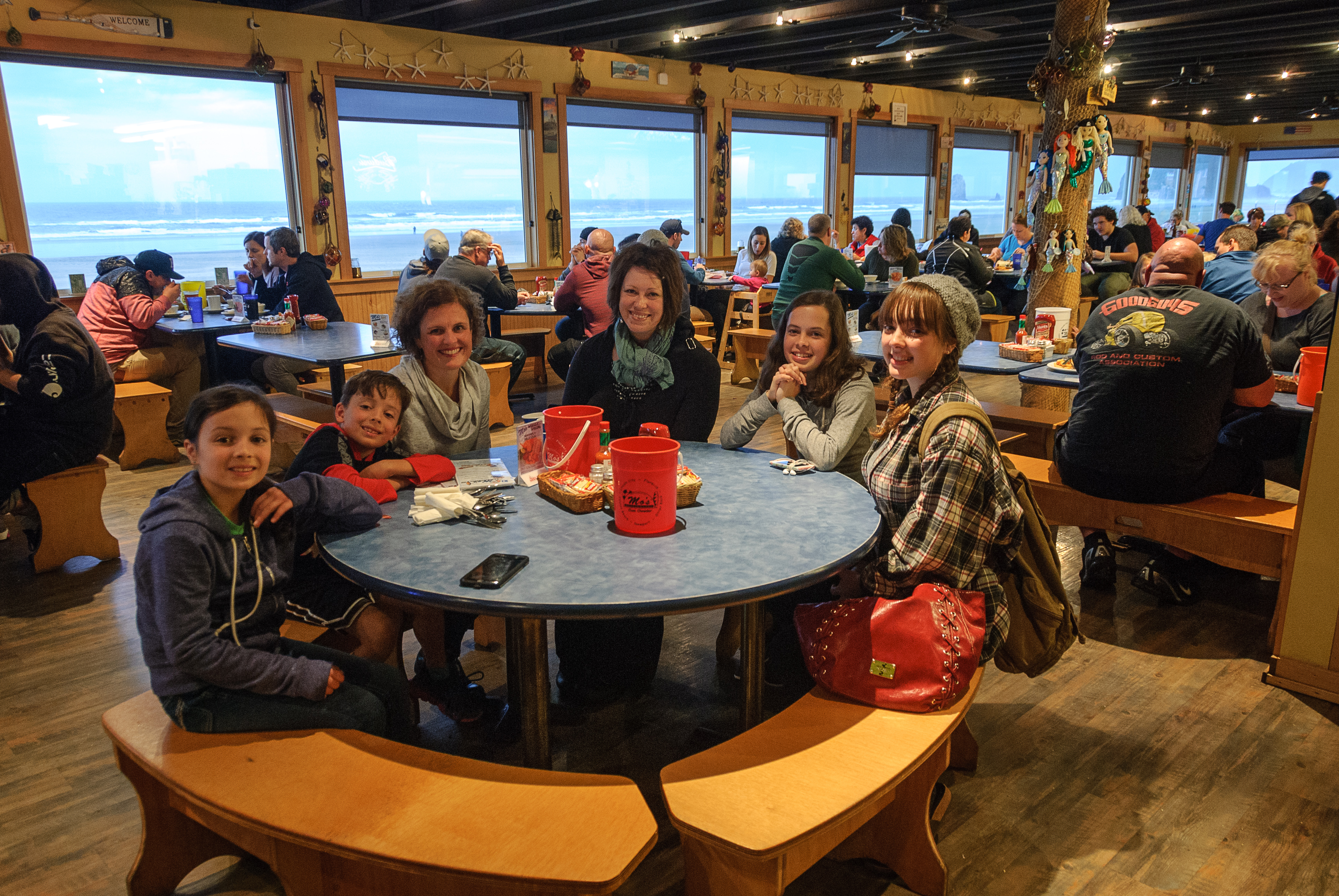
Interior of Mo's in Cannon Beach, Oregon

In 1999 Mo's clam chowder was served at a Smithsonian Institution luncheon honoring "Best American Regional Foods".

In 2001, Cindy McEntee, owner of Mo's Enterprises, was named the Small Business Administration's Small Businessperson of the Year for Oregon and was the first runner-up (of four nationwide nominees) for SBA's National Business Person of the Year. She was lauded during the Oregon presentation "for continuing a tradition of great food and outstanding generosity to employees, customers and community. (McEntee) demonstrates that commitment to serving fellow human beings is the path to business success".

Rogue Ales, an Oregon craft brewery, also headquartered in Newport uses a portrait of Mo on one of its Ale label designs (Half-E-Weizen, originally named Mo Ale) and they include this dedication on each bottle: Brewed in honor of Mo & Dutch Niemi whose spirit indelibly shapes the vibrant daily life of the Newport waterfront and our entire community. Niemi was instrumental in bringing Rogue to Newport."
