= Rose Lodge, Oregon =

Unincorporated community in the state of Oregon, United States

- Census-designated place (CDP)
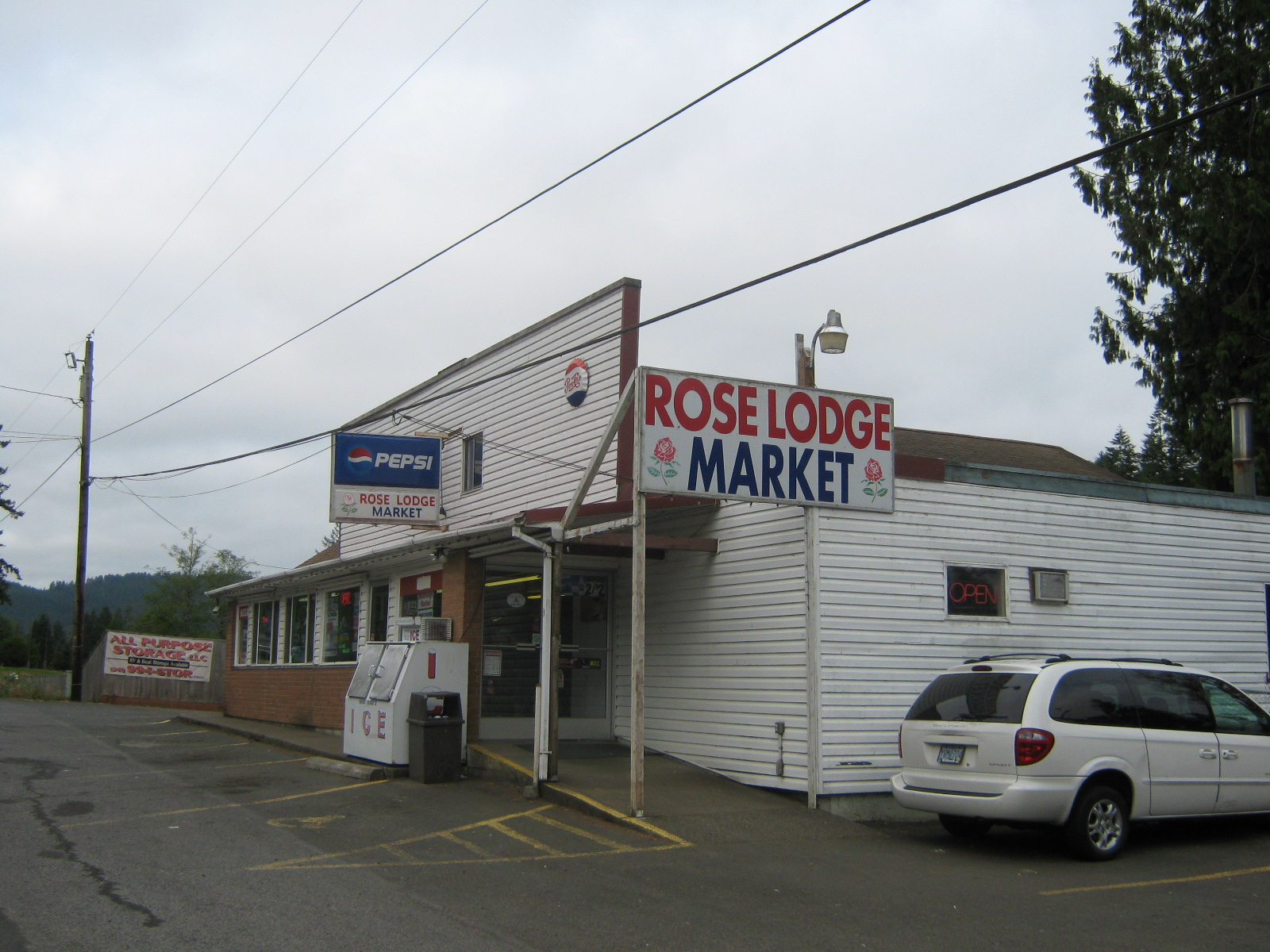
- Store in Rose Lodge

- Location of Rose Lodge, Oregon
- Coordinates: 45°00′25″N 123°51′12″W
- Country: United States
- State: Oregon
- County: Lincoln

Area
  - Total: 9.59 sq mi (24.83 km^{2})
  - Land: 9.59 sq mi (24.83 km^{2})
  - Water: 0 sq mi (0.00 km^{2})
- Elevation: 476 ft (145 m)

Population (2020)
  - Total: 1,933
  - Density: 201.6/sq mi (77.85/km^{2})
- Time zone: UTC-8 (Pacific (PST))
  - Summer (DST): UTC-7 (PDT)
- ZIP code: 97372
- Area code: 541
- FIPS code: 41-63800
- GNIS feature ID: 2409209

Rose Lodge is a census-designated place (CDP) and unincorporated community in Lincoln County, Oregon, United States, along the 45th parallel. As of the 2020 census, Rose Lodge had a population of 1,933.

Rose Lodge was named for a rose bower over the front gate of the post office established in 1908 by postmaster Julia Dodson.

== Geography ==
Rose Lodge is in northern Lincoln County, with its northern border in part following the Tillamook County line. Oregon Route 18 runs through the community, leading west 4 miles (6 km) to U.S. Route 101 and east 40 miles (64 km) to McMinnville. Lincoln City is 10 miles (16 km) southwest of Rose Lodge via Routes 18 and 101.

According to the United States Census Bureau, the CDP has a total area of 9.6 square miles (24.8 km^{2}), all of it land. The center of town is 180 feet (55 m) above sea level, along the Salmon River, which flows west to the Pacific Ocean at Cascade Head.

== Demographics ==
Historical population
Census	Pop.	Note	%±
2020	1,933		—
U.S. Decennial Census

As of the census of 2000, there were 1,708 people, 693 households, and 474 families residing in the CDP. The population density was 178.4 inhabitants per square mile (68.9/km^{2}). There were 826 housing units at an average density of 86.3 per square mile (33.3/km^{2}). The racial makeup of the CDP was 92.45% White, 0.18% African American, 2.81% Native American, 0.29% Asian, 1.35% from other races, and 2.93% from two or more races. Hispanic or Latino of any race were 3.16% of the population.

There were 693 households, out of which 23.5% had children under the age of 18 living with them, 57.6% were married couples living together, 7.6% had a female householder with no husband present, and 31.5% were non-families. 22.9% of all households were made up of individuals, and 11.1% had someone living alone who was 65 years of age or older. The average household size was 2.46 and the average family size was 2.85.

In the CDP, the population was spread out, with 21.0% under the age of 18, 7.9% from 18 to 24, 22.9% from 25 to 44, 29.6% from 45 to 64, and 18.6% who were 65 years of age or older. The median age was 44 years. For every 100 females, there were 97.9 males. For every 100 females age 18 and over, there were 92.9 males.

The median income for a household in the CDP was $39,214, and the median income for a family was $43,250. Males had a median income of $31,759 versus $19,957 for females. The per capita income for the CDP was $18,297. About 8.9% of families and 13.5% of the population were below the poverty line, including 15.2% of those under age 18 and 7.4% of those age 65 or over.
