= Otter Rock, Oregon =

Unincorporated community in the state of Oregon, United States

- Unincorporated community
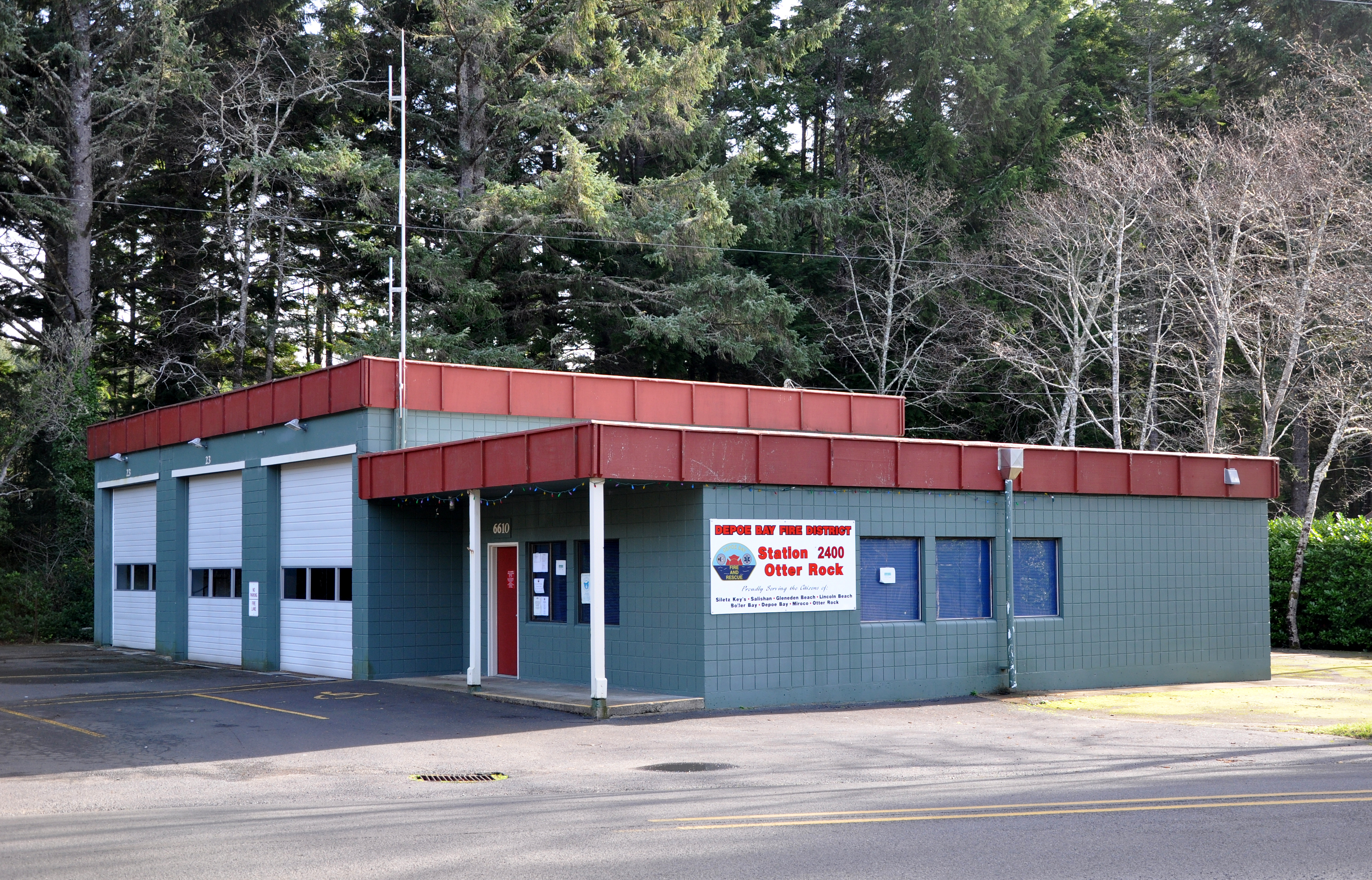
- Otter Rock fire station

- Location within Oregon Location within the United States
- Coordinates: 44°44′49″N 124°03′41″W
- Country: United States
- State: Oregon
- County: Lincoln
- Elevation: 98 ft (30 m)
- Time zone: UTC-8 (PST)
  - Summer (DST): UTC-7 (PDT)
- ZIP codes: 97369
- GNIS feature ID: 1125065

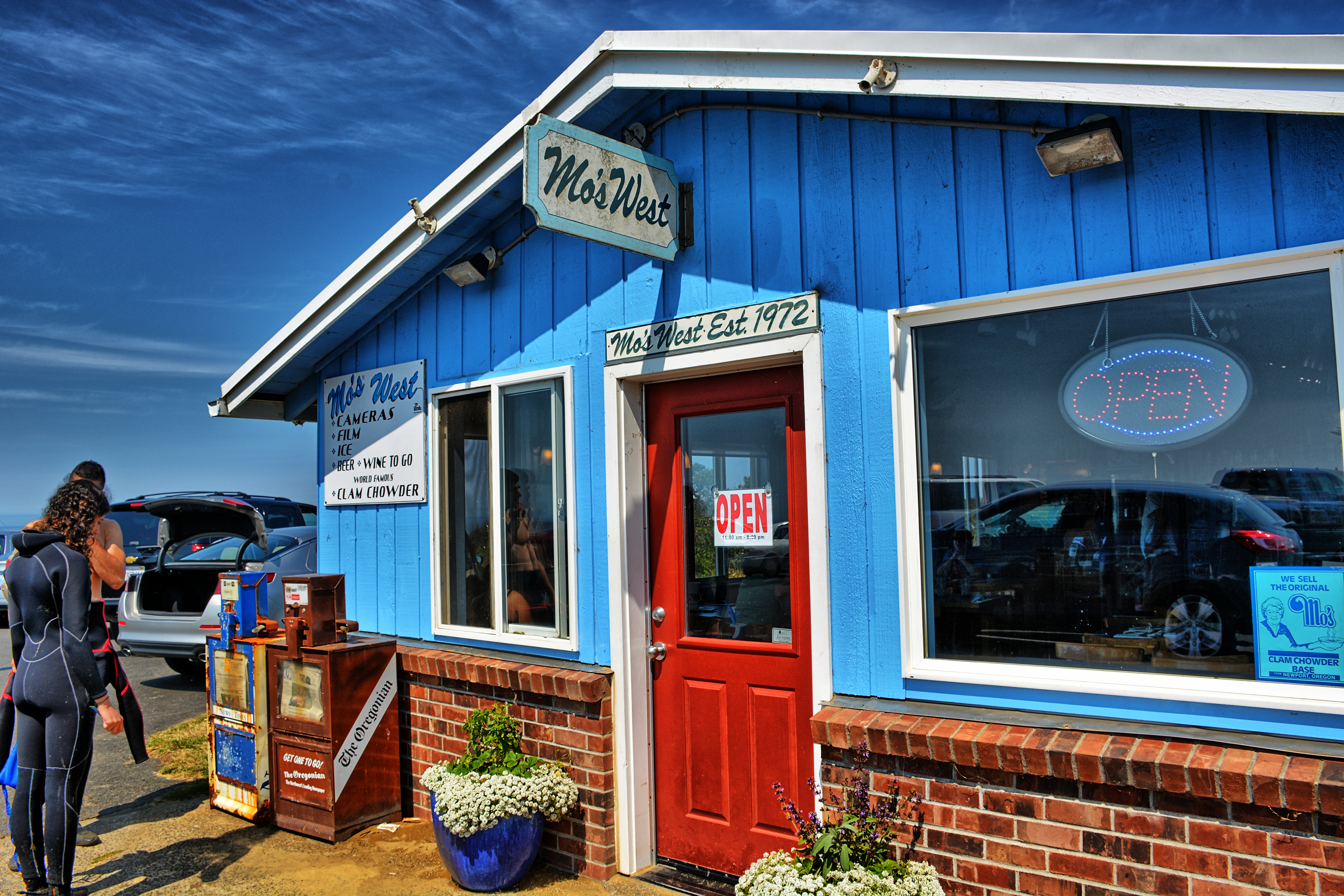
Mo's in Otter Rock

Otter Rock is an unincorporated community in Lincoln County, Oregon, United States. It is located on U.S. Route 101 along the Oregon Coast. Otter Rock is 5.4 miles south of Depoe Bay and 8 miles north of Newport, Oregon. Otter Rock takes its name from a rock located about 1/2 mile (0.8 km) offshore and 3.25 miles (5.23 km) north of Yaquina Head where sea otters formerly lived.

There are various activities to do around Otter Rock throughout the year such as surfing, wine tasting, whale watching, tide pool exploring, and beach combing. The Devils Punch Bowl State Natural Area is located in Otter Rock.

As of 2019 the population of Otter Rock is approximately 225, up from 193 occupants in 2010.

== Climate ==
The Koppen Climate Classification system classifies Otter Rock as having a "dry-summer subtropical" climate, which is also referred to as "Mediterranean." The subtype known for this climate is "csb" or "dry-summer subtropical." The average temperature at Otter Rock is 50.8 °F (10.4 °C). On average the warmest month of the year is August and the coldest is January. The average annual precipitation is 72 inches (1,800 mm) along with 1 inch (25 mm) of snow. The average number of sunny days Otter Rock receives is 157 and the average number of days with precipitation is 110.

== Otter Rock Marine Reserve ==
Otter Rock Marine Reserve is currently the smallest marine reserve along the Oregon coast. It is approximately 1.2 square miles located from Otter Rock down to Beverly State Beach. Near the north end of the reserve, where the town of Otter Rock is located, are tide pools. Monitoring began in 2010 and harvest restrictions were put in place in 2012. A variety of seaweed, mussels, sea stars, fish, seals, sea anemones, octopuses, and chitons live here. Currently, scientists from Oregon State University, the Partnership for Interdisciplinary Studies of Coastal Oceans (PISCO), and UC Santa Cruz conduct studies and survey juvenile fish settlement in the area.
