= Nortons, Oregon =

Unincorporated community in the state of Oregon, United States

- Unincorporated community
- Location within Oregon Location within the United States
- Coordinates: 44.664°N 123.702°W
- Country: United States
- State: Oregon
- County: Lincoln
- Elevation: 187 ft (57 m)
- Time zone: UTC-8 (Pacific (PST))
  - Summer (DST): UTC-7 (PDT)
- ZIP code: 97343
- Area codes: 458 and 541

Nortons is an unincorporated community in Lincoln County, Oregon, United States.
