= Beverly Beach, Oregon =

Unincorporated community in Oregon, United States

Coordinates: 44.721°N 124.057°W

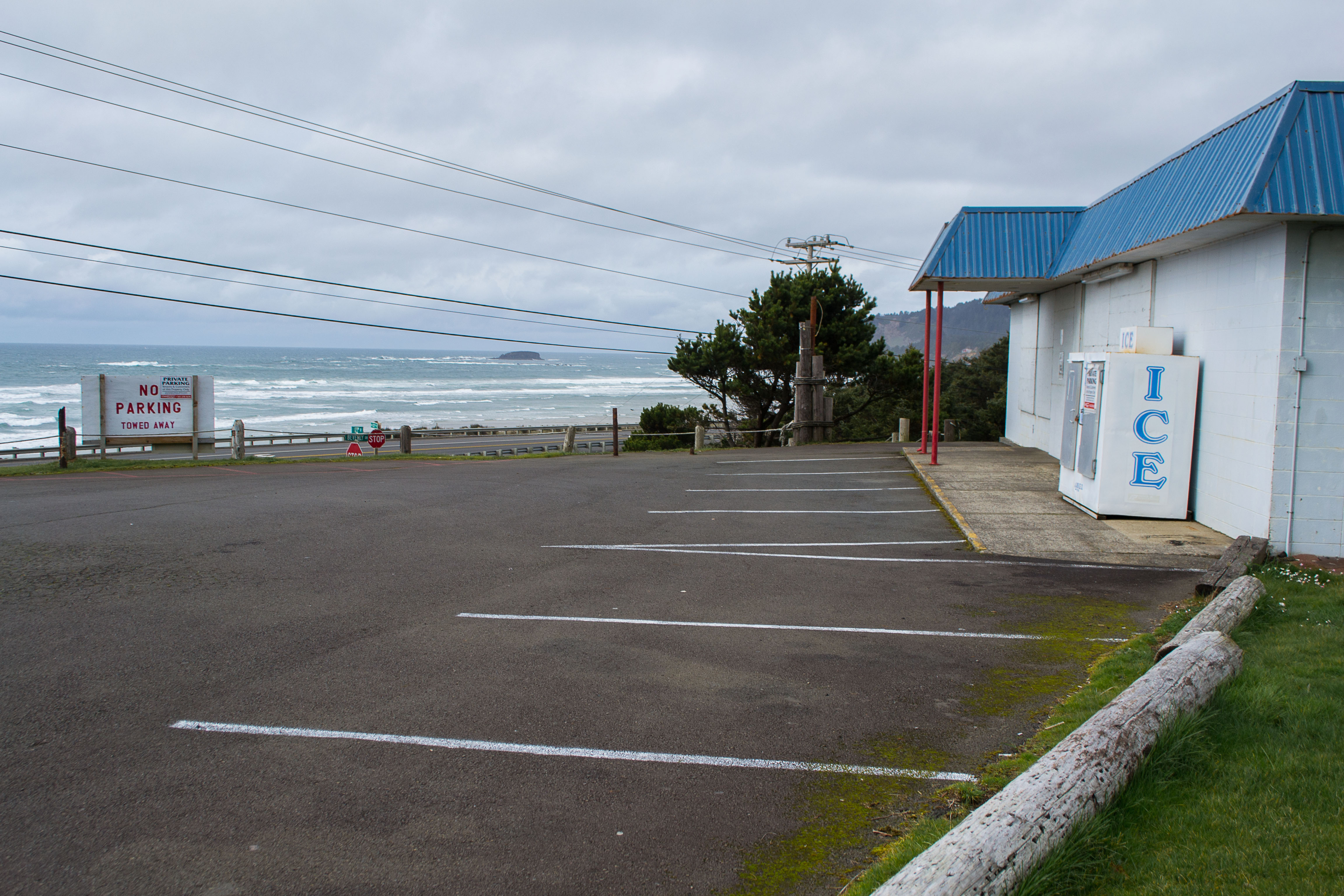
The community of Beverly Beach, Oregon, overlooks a beach of the same name

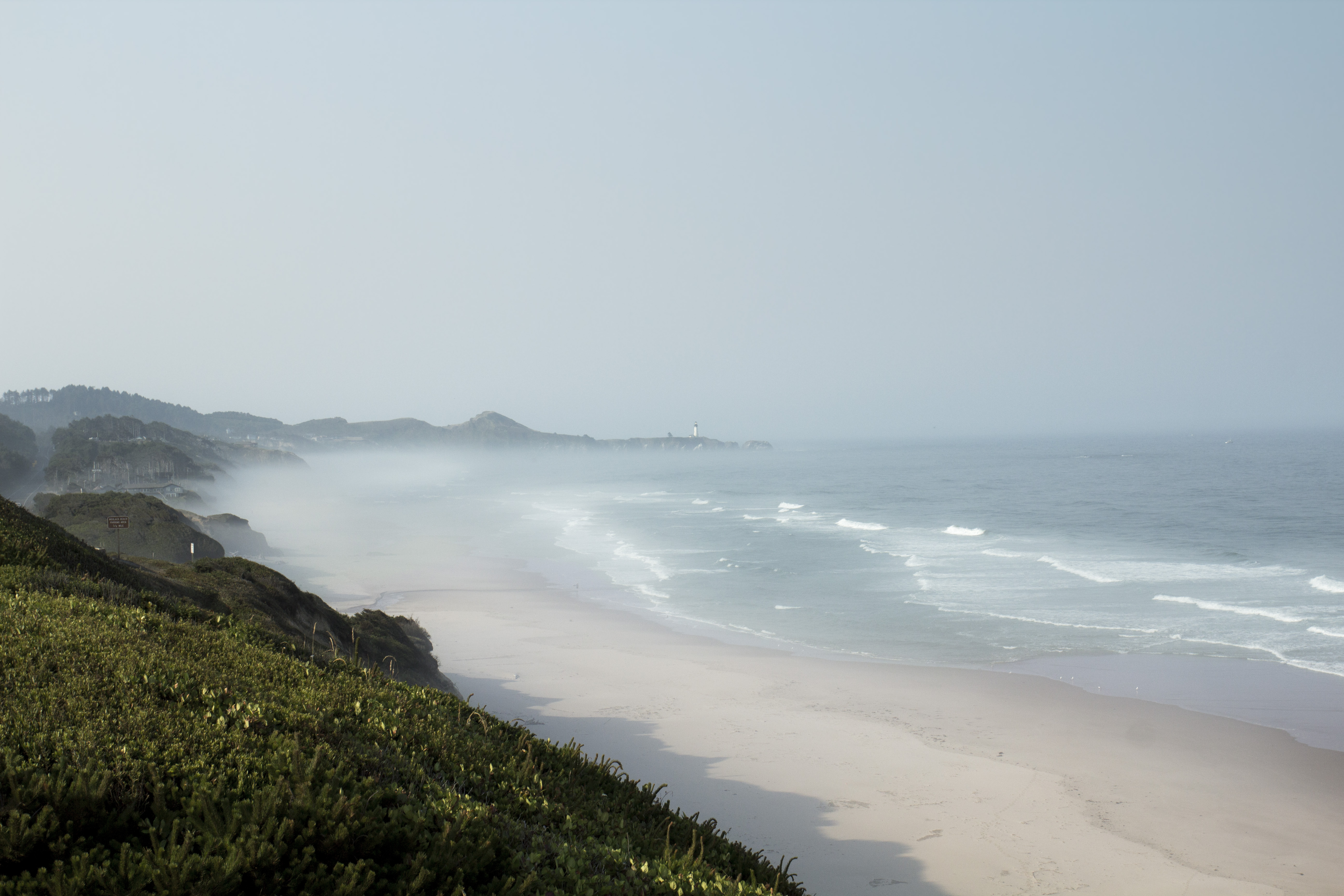
Beverly Beach

Beverly Beach is an unincorporated community in Lincoln County in the U.S. state of Oregon. It is located on U.S. Route 101 on the Oregon Coast, north of Yaquina Head and south of Beverly Beach State Park.

Beverly Beach was named in the early 1930s by Curtis F. and Florence May Christy, who owned the property in this location. They wished to establish a seaside community there, and asked their young daughter, Florence Daneene Christy (Pearson), what it should be named. Her favorite doll was named "Beverly", so that was the name she chose.
