= Newport Heights, Oregon =

Unincorporated community in the state of Oregon, United States

- Unincorporated community
- Location within Oregon Location within the United States
- Coordinates: 44.644°N 124.025°W
- Country: United States
- State: Oregon
- County: Lincoln
- Elevation: 459 ft (140 m)
- Time zone: UTC-8 (Pacific (PST))
  - Summer (DST): UTC-7 (PDT)
- ZIP code: 97365
- Area codes: 458 and 541

Newport Heights is an unincorporated community in Lincoln County, Oregon, United States.
