= San Marine, Oregon =

- Census-designated place
- Location within Oregon Location within the United States
- Coordinates: 44°21′17″N 124°05′40″W
- Country: United States
- State: Oregon
- County: Lincoln

Area
  - Total: 1.99 sq mi (5.15 km^{2})
  - Land: 1.13 sq mi (2.92 km^{2})
  - Water: 0.86 sq mi (2.23 km^{2})
- Elevation: 26 ft (7.9 m)

Population (2020)
  - Total: 553
  - Density: 490.5/sq mi (189.37/km^{2})
- Time zone: UTC-8 (Pacific (PST))
  - Summer (DST): UTC-7 (PDT)
- ZIP Code: 97498 (Yachats)
- Area codes: 541/458
- FIPS code: 41-65300
- GNIS feature ID: 2812890

San Marine is an unincorporated community and census-designated place (CDP) in Lincoln County, Oregon, United States. It was first listed as a CDP prior to the 2020 census. As of the 2020 census, San Marine had a population of 553.

The CDP is in southern Lincoln County, along the Pacific Ocean. U.S. Route 101 passes through the CDP, leading north 5 miles (8 km) to Waldport and south 3 miles (5 km) to Yachats.

== Demographics ==
Historical population
Census	Pop.	Note	%±
2020	553		—
U.S. Decennial Census
