= Logsden, Oregon =

Unincorporated community in the state of Oregon, United States

- Unincorporated community
- Location within Oregon Location within the United States
- Coordinates: 44°44′35″N 123°47′39″W
- Country: United States
- State: Oregon
- County: Lincoln
- Elevation: 217 ft (66 m)
- Time zone: UTC-8 (Pacific (PST))
  - Summer (DST): UTC-7 (PDT)
- ZIP code: 97357
- Area code: 541
- GNIS feature ID: 1136494

Logsden is an unincorporated community in Lincoln County, Oregon, United States. Logsden is 7 miles (11 km) east of Siletz. Logsden has a post office with ZIP code 97357.
