= Siletz Bay National Wildlife Refuge =

American wildlife refuge in Oregon

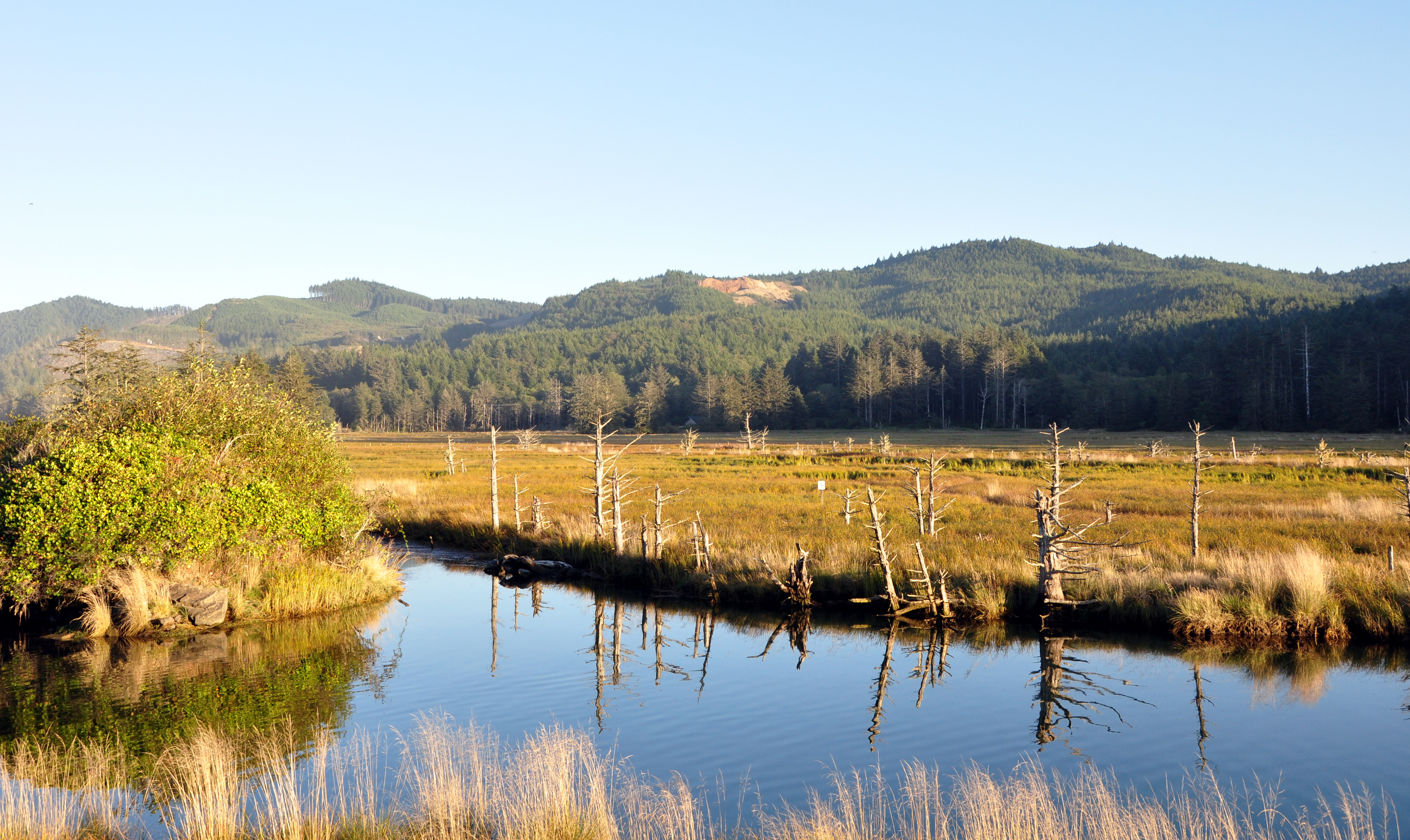
- View from U.S. Route 101 near Millport Slough

- Location within Oregon
- Location: Lincoln City, Lincoln County, Oregon, United States
- Coordinates: 44°54′12″N 124°01′11″W
- Elevation: 0 ft (0 m)
- Established: in 1991
- Operator: United States Fish and Wildlife Service
- Website: Siletz Bay NWR

Siletz Bay National Wildlife Refuge is a U.S. National Wildlife Refuge on Oregon's coast. It is one of six National Wildlife Refuges (NWRs) comprising the Oregon Coast National Wildlife Refuge Complex. The refuge consists of several discontinuous tracts north and south of the Siletz River where it enters Siletz Bay south of Lincoln City. Previously closed to public use, excluding viewing from outside the refuge boundaries and during special events, the refuge now has a boat launch offering access to non-motorized boats. Alder Island Nature Trail caters to visitors on foot, opened in 2017, and is 0.85 miles (1.37 km) round trip.

Siletz Bay NWR was established in 1991 primarily to return salt marsh to its natural state. Formerly it had been diked and ditched to create pasture for dairy cows. One segment of the refuge near Millport Slough, an arm of the lower Siletz River, consists of a 100-acre (40 ha) tidal marsh restored by the United States Fish and Wildlife Service, Ducks Unlimited, and the Confederated Tribes of Siletz. Together they breached 220 feet (67 m) of dikes, removed dikes totaling 9,300 feet (2,800 m), filled 1,200 feet (370 m) of ditches, and added woody debris to improve fish habitat. Salt-starched skeleton trees are visible along both sides of U.S. Route 101 (which runs through the refuge) from the time when the salt marsh was diked. Red-tailed hawks and bald eagles are often visible roosting on these snags. Abundant great blue herons and great egrets live nearby.

== See also ==
- List of National Wildlife Refuges
- Siletz Reef
