= Gleneden Beach, Oregon =

Unincorporated community in Lincoln County, coastal Oregon, United States

- Unincorporated community
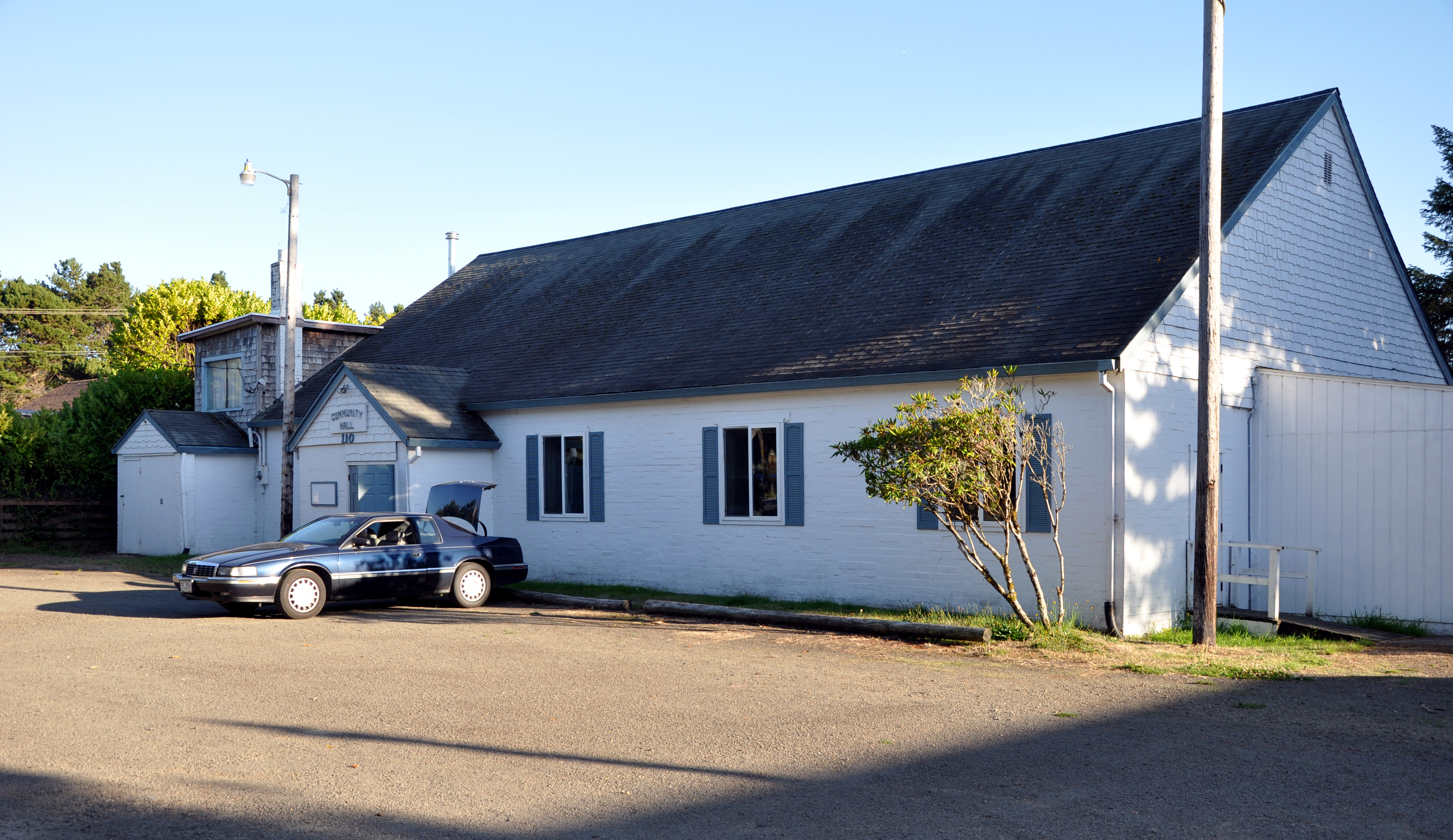
- Gleneden Beach Community Hall

- Location within Oregon Location within the United States
- Coordinates: 44°52′52″N 124°02′03″W
- Country: United States
- State: Oregon
- County: Lincoln
- Elevation: 46 ft (14 m)
- Time zone: UTC-8 (PST)
  - Summer (DST): UTC-7 (PDT)
- ZIP codes: 97388
- Area code: 541
- Coordinates and elevation from United States Geological Survey

Gleneden Beach /ɡlɛnˈɪdɪn/ is an unincorporated community in Lincoln County, Oregon, United States. The area was originally platted in 1927 and was named after its founding family members. It is located on the Oregon Coast five miles south of Lincoln City off the Gleneden Beach Loop exit on U.S. Route 101.

== Climate ==
This region experiences warm (but not hot) and dry summers, with no average monthly temperatures above 71.6 °F (22.0 °C). According to the Köppen Climate Classification system, Gleneden Beach has a warm-summer Mediterranean climate, abbreviated "Csb" on climate maps.

== Demographics ==
- There are 1,270 housing units in Gleneden Beach, and the median year in which these properties were built is 1977. Of the 537 occupied housing units in Gleneden Beach, 67.97% are owner-occupied, while 32.03% have renters living in them.
- There are 1,088 residents in Gleneden Beach, with a median age of 60. Of this, 45.96% are males and 54.04% are females. US-born citizens make up 94.39% of the resident pool in Gleneden Beach, while non-US-born citizens account for 1.38%. Additionally, 4.23% of the population is represented by non-citizens. A total of 853 people in Gleneden Beach currently live in the same house as they did last year.

== See also ==
- Gleneden Beach State Recreation Site
- Siletz Reef
