= Lincoln County, Oregon =

County in Oregon, United States

- County
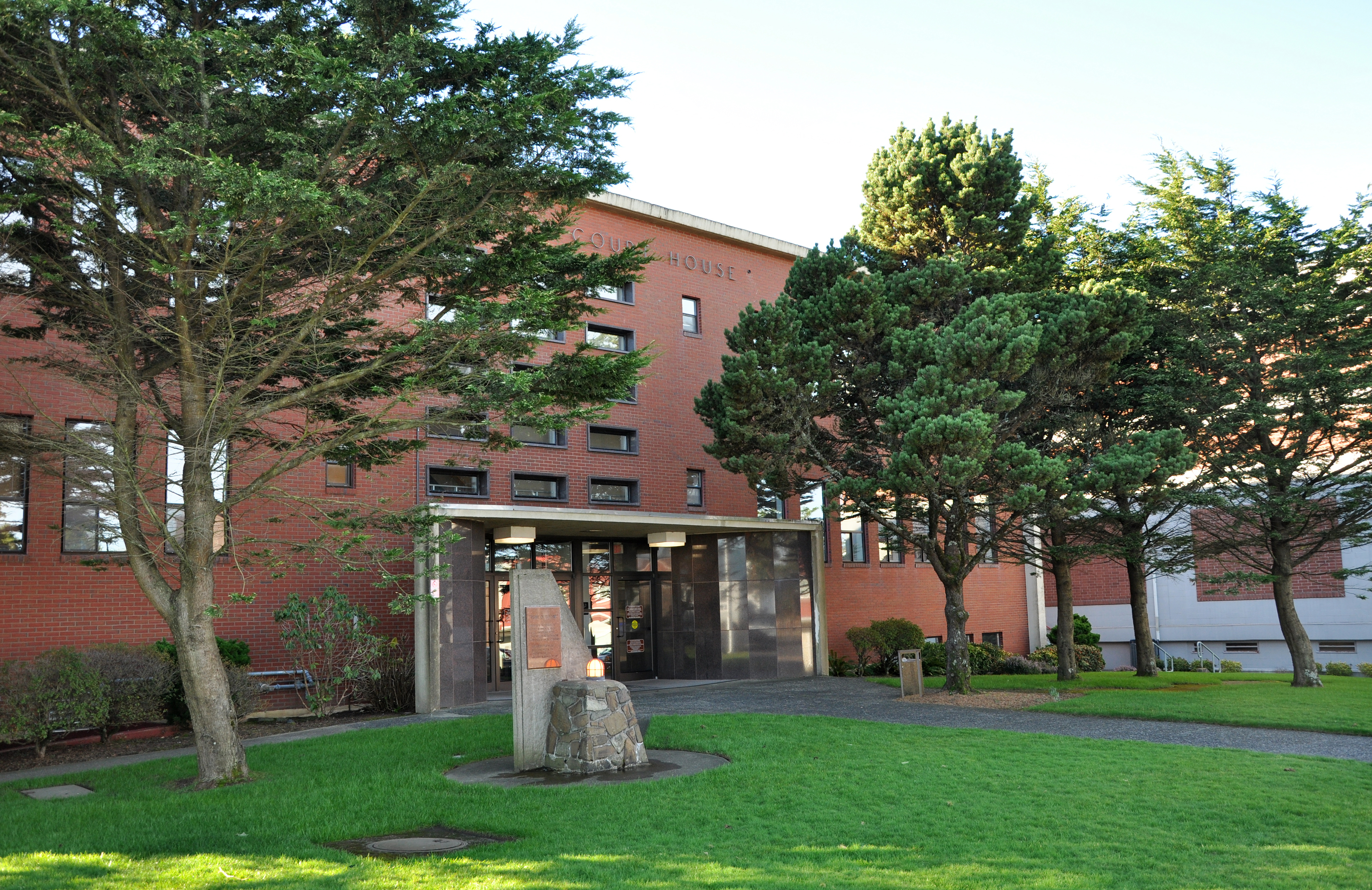
- Lincoln County Courthouse in Newport

- Flag

- Location within the U.S. state of Oregon
- Coordinates: 44°38′N 123°55′W
- Country: United States
- State: Oregon
- Founded: February 20, 1893
- Named for: Abraham Lincoln
- Seat: Newport
- Largest city: Newport

Area
  - Total: 1,194 sq mi (3,090 km^{2})
  - Land: 980 sq mi (2,500 km^{2})
  - Water: 214 sq mi (550 km^{2}) 18%

Population (2020)
  - Total: 50,395
  - Estimate (2025): 50,636 ▲
  - Density: 47/sq mi (18/km^{2})
- Time zone: UTC−8 (Pacific)
  - Summer (DST): UTC−7 (PDT)
- Congressional district: 4th
- Website: www.co.lincoln.or.us

Map of Lincoln County

Lincoln County is one of the 36 counties in the U.S. state of Oregon. As of the 2020 census, its population was 50,395. The county seat is Newport. The county is named for Abraham Lincoln, 16th president of the United States.

Lincoln County includes the Newport, Oregon Micropolitan Statistical Area.

== History ==
Lincoln County was created by the Oregon Legislative Assembly on February 20, 1893, from the western portion of Benton and Polk counties. The county adjusted its boundaries in 1923, 1925, 1927, 1931, and 1949.

At the time of the county's creation, Toledo was picked as the temporary county seat. In 1896 it was chosen as the permanent county seat. Three elections were held to determine if the county seat should be moved from Toledo to Newport. Twice these votes failed—in 1928 and 1938. In 1954, however, the vote went in Newport's favor. While Toledo has remained the industrial hub of Lincoln County, the city has never regained the position it once had.

Like Tillamook County to the north, for the first decades of its existence Lincoln County was isolated from the rest of the state. This was solved with the construction of U.S. Route 101 (completed in 1925), and the Salmon River Highway (completed in 1930). In 1936, as some of many federally funded construction projects during the Great Depression, bridges were constructed across the bays at Waldport, Newport, and Siletz, eliminating the ferries needed to cross these bays.

The northern part of Lincoln County includes the Siletz Reservation, created by treaty in 1855. The reservation was open to non-Indian settlement between 1895 and 1925. The Siletz's tribal status was terminated by the federal government in 1954, but in 1977 it became the first Oregon tribe to have its tribal status reinstated. The current reservation totals 3,666 acres (14.84 km^{2}).

In 2020, during the COVID-19 pandemic, Lincoln County issued a face mask directive which exempted "people of color". After county officials were overwhelmed with criticism, the exemption was rescinded.

== Economy ==
Principal industries of the county are travel (primarily tourism), trade, health services and construction. Paper manufacturing and fishing are still important although they contribute proportionally less to the county's employment than they used to. Newport is one of the two major fishing ports of Oregon (along with Astoria) that ranks in the top twenty of fishing ports in the U.S. Its port averaged 105 million pounds (48,000 t) of fish landed in 1997–2000. Newport is home of Oregon State University's Hatfield Marine Science Center, as well as the Oregon Coast Aquarium, and their fleet of ocean-going vessels.

Many of the other communities in Lincoln county depend on tourism as their principal source of income. The county's average nonfarm employment was 18,820 in 2007.

== Geography ==
According to the United States Census Bureau, the county has a total area of 1,194 square miles (3,090 km^{2}), of which 980 square miles (2,500 km^{2}) is land and 214 square miles (550 km^{2}) (18%) is water.

=== Adjacent counties ===
- Tillamook County (north)
- Polk County (east)
- Benton County (east)
- Lane County (south)

=== National protected areas ===
- Oregon Islands National Wildlife Refuge (part)
- Siletz Bay National Wildlife Refuge
- Siuslaw National Forest (part)

== Demographics ==
Historical population
Census	Pop.	Note	%±
1900	3,575		—
1910	5,587		56.3%
1920	6,084		8.9%
1930	9,903		62.8%
1940	14,549		46.9%
1950	21,308		46.5%
1960	24,635		15.6%
1970	25,755		4.5%
1980	35,264		36.9%
1990	38,889		10.3%
2000	44,479		14.4%
2010	46,034		3.5%
2020	50,395		9.5%
2025 (est.)	50,636	▲	0.5%
U.S. Decennial Census; 1790–1960 1900–1990; 1990–2000 2010–2020

=== 2020 census ===
As of the 2020 census, the county had a population of 50,395. Of the residents, 15.9% were under the age of 18 and 30.6% were 65 years of age or older; the median age was 52.9 years. For every 100 females there were 92.8 males, and for every 100 females age 18 and over there were 90.6 males. Sixty-two percent of residents lived in urban areas and 38.0% lived in rural areas.

The racial makeup of the county was 80.6% White, 0.4% Black or African American, 3.6% American Indian and Alaska Native, 1.3% Asian, 0.2% Native Hawaiian and Pacific Islander, 4.2% from some other race, and 9.7% from two or more races. Hispanic or Latino residents of any race comprised 9.6% of the population.

Lincoln County, Oregon – Racial and ethnic composition Note: the US Census treats Hispanic/Latino as an ethnic category. This table excludes Latinos from the racial categories and assigns them to a separate category. Hispanics/Latinos may be of any race.
Race / Ethnicity (NH = Non-Hispanic)	Pop 1980	Pop 1990	Pop 2000	Pop 2010	Pop 2020	% 1980	% 1990	% 2000	% 2010	% 2020
White alone (NH)	34,014	36,962	39,260	38,863	39,498	96.46%	95.04%	88.27%	84.42%	78.38%
Black or African American alone (NH)	43	63	113	159	189	0.12%	0.16%	0.25%	0.35%	0.38%
Native American or Alaska Native alone (NH)	538	926	1,296	1,433	1,521	1.53%	2.38%	2.91%	3.11%	3.02%
Asian alone (NH)	159	329	412	482	646	0.45%	0.85%	0.93%	1.05%	1.28%
Native Hawaiian or Pacific Islander alone (NH)	x	x	66	52	93	x	x	0.15%	0.11%	0.18%
Other race alone (NH)	113	11	31	36	276	0.32%	0.03%	0.07%	0.08%	0.55%
Mixed race or Multiracial (NH)	x	x	1,182	1,354	3,321	x	x	2.66%	2.94%	6.59%
Hispanic or Latino (any race)	397	598	2,119	3,655	4,851	1.13%	1.54%	4.76%	7.94%	9.63%
Total	35,264	38,889	44,479	46,034	50,395	100.00%	100.00%	100.00%	100.00%	100.00%

=== American Community Survey 2025 data ===
The United States Census Bureau estimated that in 2025, Lincoln County’s population was 50.842. It was also estimated that the county's population was 77,00% Non-Hispanic White, 12,20% Hispanic or Latino, 1,00% Non-Hispanic Black, 1,70% Asian, 2,50% Native American, 0,40% Pacific Islander, and 5,20% Multiracial.

Total	Population	Percentage
Non-Hispanic White	39.148	77,00%
Hispanic or Latino	6.203	12,20%
Non-Hispanic Black	508	1,00%
Asian	864	1,70%
Native American	1.271	2,50%
Pacific Islander	203	0,40%
Non-Hispanic Multiracial	2.644	5,20%

There were 22,707 households in the county, of which 19.4% had children under the age of 18 living with them and 29.1% had a female householder with no spouse or partner present. About 32.0% of all households were made up of individuals and 18.2% had someone living alone who was 65 years of age or older.

There were 32,066 housing units, of which 29.2% were vacant. Among occupied housing units, 66.6% were owner-occupied and 33.4% were renter-occupied. The homeowner vacancy rate was 2.3% and the rental vacancy rate was 8.5%.

=== 2010 census ===
As of the 2010 census, there were 46,034 people, 20,550 households, and 12,372 families living in the county. The population density was 47.0 inhabitants per square mile (18.1/km^{2}). There were 30,610 housing units at an average density of 31.2 units per square mile (12.0 units/km^{2}). The racial makeup of the county was 87.7% white, 3.5% American Indian, 1.1% Asian, 0.4% black or African American, 0.1% Pacific islander, 3.4% from other races, and 3.7% from two or more races. Those of Hispanic or Latino origin made up 7.9% of the population. In terms of ancestry, 23.5% were German, 22.0% were English, 14.6% were Irish, and 4.6% were American.

Of the 20,550 households, 21.2% had children under the age of 18 living with them, 46.3% were married couples living together, 9.6% had a female householder with no husband present, 39.8% were non-families, and 31.2% of all households were made up of individuals. The average household size was 2.20 and the average family size was 2.70. The median age was 49.6 years.

The median income for a household in the county was $39,738 and the median income for a family was $52,730. Males had a median income of $42,416 versus $31,690 for females. The per capita income for the county was $24,354. About 11.7% of families and 16.2% of the population were below the poverty line, including 21.7% of those under age 18 and 8.8% of those age 65 or over.

=== 2000 census ===
As of the 2000 census, there were 44,479 people, 19,296 households, and 12,252 families living in the county. The population density was 45 people per square mile (17 people/km^{2}). There were 26,889 housing units at an average density of 27 units per square mile (10/km^{2}). The racial makeup of the county was 90.59% White, 0.30% Black or African American, 3.14% Native American, 0.93% Asian, 0.16% Pacific Islander, 1.66% from other races, and 3.23% from two or more races. 4.76% of the population were Hispanic or Latino of any race. 16.8% were of German, 13.5% English, 10.8% Irish and 8.5% American ancestry.

There were 19,296 households, out of which 24.40% had children under the age of 18 living with them, 49.50% were married couples living together, 10.00% had a female householder with no husband present, and 36.50% were non-families. 29.30% of all households were made up of individuals, and 12.70% had someone living alone who was 65 years of age or older. The average household size was 2.27 and the average family size was 2.75.

In the county, the population was spread out, with 21.40% under the age of 18, 6.50% from 18 to 24, 23.50% from 25 to 44, 29.00% from 45 to 64, and 19.50% who were 65 years of age or older. The median age was 44 years. For every 100 females there were 94.00 males. For every 100 females age 18 and over, there were 90.10 males.

The median income for a household in the county was $32,769, and the median income for a family was $39,403. Males had a median income of $32,407 versus $22,622 for females. The per capita income for the county was $18,692. About 9.80% of families and 13.90% of the population were below the poverty line, including 19.50% of those under age 18 and 7.20% of those age 65 or over.

== Politics ==
In its early history, Lincoln County, like almost all of Western Oregon during the era, was very solidly Republican. It was won by the Republican presidential nominee in every election from its creation up to and including 1928, even voting for William Howard Taft in 1912 when his party was divided. Since Franklin Delano Roosevelt became the first Democrat to carry the county in 1932, Lincoln has become a strongly Democratic-leaning county. The only Republicans to win Lincoln County since the Great Depression transformed its politics have been Dwight D. Eisenhower, Richard Nixon and Ronald Reagan, who each carried the county twice. With the exception of 1968 (in which the county only backed Nixon by 22 votes), all of these post-Depression Republican wins in Lincoln County occurred during landslide victories for Republicans across the nation. Starting in 1988, Lincoln County has since remained reliably Democratic, backing Democratic candidates for president often by double digit margins.

In the United States House of Representatives, Lincoln County lies within Oregon's 4th congressional district, represented by Democrat Val Hoyle. In the Oregon House of Representatives, Lincoln County is in the 10th District, which is represented by Democrat David Gomberg. In the Oregon State Senate, Lincoln County is in the 5th District, represented by Republican Dick Anderson.

Lincoln County elected the first (and to date, only) trans woman to elected office in Oregon history in 2020, when County Commissioner Claire Hall was re-elected to her seat after coming out as transgender in 2018. Hall was re-elected in 2024 and died in office on January 4, 2026 after a short illness while battling a recall campaign.

Lincoln County is currently one of 11 counties in Oregon in which therapeutic psilocybin is legal.

United States presidential election results for Lincoln County, Oregon
Year	Republican		Democratic		Third party(ies)	
Year	No.	%	No.	%	No.	%
1904	581	64.84%	179	19.98%	136	15.18%
1908	595	58.51%	282	27.73%	140	13.77%
1912	410	31.08%	375	28.43%	534	40.49%
1916	1,167	50.87%	915	39.89%	212	9.24%
1920	1,229	59.09%	669	32.16%	182	8.75%
1924	1,328	52.20%	641	25.20%	575	22.60%
1928	2,100	57.33%	1,464	39.97%	99	2.70%
1932	1,415	35.39%	2,376	59.43%	207	5.18%
1936	1,585	31.44%	3,024	59.98%	433	8.59%
1940	2,962	45.12%	3,510	53.47%	93	1.42%
1944	2,801	48.19%	2,947	50.70%	65	1.12%
1948	3,587	46.85%	3,720	48.59%	349	4.56%
1952	5,559	60.08%	3,632	39.26%	61	0.66%
1956	5,346	53.62%	4,624	46.38%	0	0.00%
1960	5,231	49.90%	5,243	50.01%	9	0.09%
1964	3,200	31.00%	7,101	68.79%	22	0.21%
1968	5,031	47.02%	5,009	46.82%	659	6.16%
1972	6,112	51.56%	5,117	43.17%	625	5.27%
1976	5,755	43.60%	6,685	50.65%	759	5.75%
1980	7,637	44.59%	7,009	40.92%	2,481	14.49%
1984	9,110	51.17%	8,637	48.51%	57	0.32%
1988	7,364	42.22%	9,598	55.02%	481	2.76%
1992	5,716	26.43%	9,603	44.41%	6,304	29.15%
1996	6,717	32.60%	10,552	51.21%	3,338	16.20%
2000	8,446	39.99%	10,861	51.43%	1,811	8.58%
2004	10,160	41.77%	13,753	56.54%	412	1.69%
2008	8,791	36.80%	14,258	59.68%	840	3.52%
2012	8,686	37.79%	13,401	58.31%	897	3.90%
2016	10,039	39.75%	12,501	49.50%	2,716	10.75%
2020	12,460	40.55%	17,385	56.58%	881	2.87%
2024	11,645	39.07%	17,112	57.42%	1,047	3.51%

== Communities ==
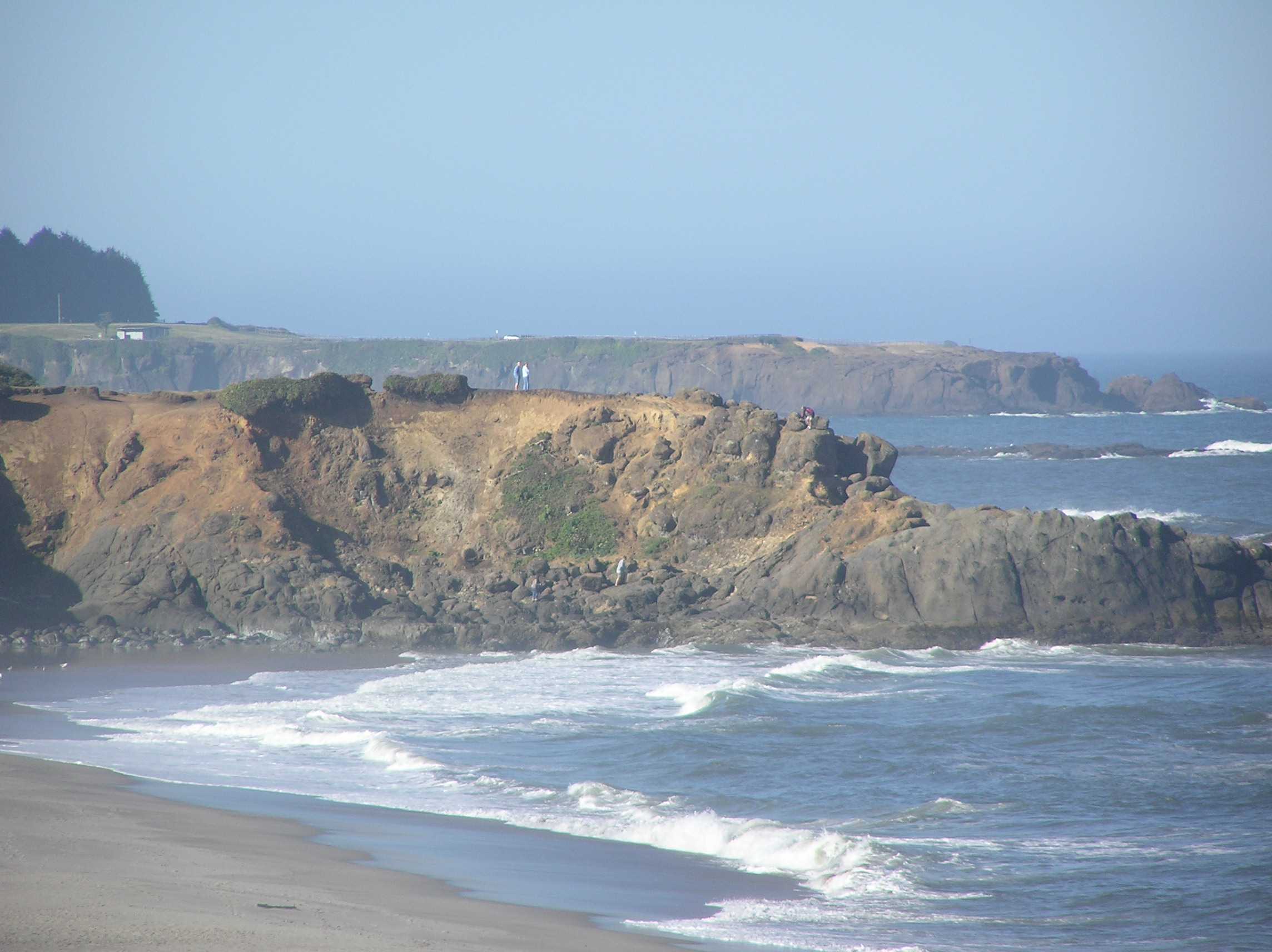
Lincoln Beach, Oregon, Fishing Rock with Rabbit Rock in background

=== Cities ===
- Depoe Bay
- Lincoln City
- Newport (county seat)
- Siletz
- Toledo
- Waldport
- Yachats

=== Census-designated places ===
- Bayshore
- Lincoln Beach
- Neotsu
- Rose Lodge
- San Marine

=== Unincorporated communities ===
- Agate Beach
- Bayview
- Beverly Beach
- Burnt Woods
- Chitwood
- Eddyville
- Elk City
- Fisher
- Gleneden Beach
- Harlan
- Kernville
- Little Albany
- Logsden
- Nashville
- Newport Heights
- Nortons
- Ocean Park
- Otis
- Otis Junction
- Otter Rock
- Roads End
- Seal Rock
- South Beach
- Tidewater
- Yaquina

== Education ==
There is one school district in the county, the Lincoln County School District.

The county is in the Oregon Coast Community College district.

== See also ==
- List of bridges on the National Register of Historic Places in Oregon
- National Register of Historic Places listings in Lincoln County, Oregon
