= Oregon Route 250 =

State highway in Curry County, Oregon, US

Oregon Route 250
- Route 250 highlighted in red

Route information
- Maintained by ODOT
- Length: 5.41 mi (8.71 km)
- Existed: 2002–present

Major junctions
- West end: Cape Blanco State Park
- East end: US 101 near Sixes

Location
- Country: United States
- State: Oregon
- County: Curry

Highway system
- Oregon Highways; Interstate; US; State; Named; Scenic
← OR 245	→ OR 251

Oregon Route 250 (OR 250) is an Oregon state highway running from Cape Blanco State Park to OR 101 near Sixes. OR 250 is known as the Cape Blanco Highway No. 250 (see Oregon highways and routes). It is 5.41 miles (8.71 km) long and runs east–west, entirely within Curry County.

OR 250 was established in 2002 as part of Oregon's project to assign route numbers to highways that previously were not assigned, and, as of August 2008, was unsigned.

== Route description ==
OR 250 begins at the west boundary of Cape Blanco State Park and heads east to an intersection with US 101 one mile (1.6 km) south of Sixes, where it ends.

== History ==
OR 250 was assigned to the Cape Blanco Highway in 2002.

== Major intersections ==
The entire route is in Curry County.

Location	mi	km	Destinations	Notes
	0.18	0.29	Cape Blanco State Park	Western terminus
Sixes	5.57	8.96	US 101	Eastern terminus
1.000 mi = 1.609 km; 1.000 km = 0.621 mi
