= Oregon Route 528 =

State highway in Lane County, Oregon, US

Oregon Route 528
- Route 528 highlighted in red

Route information
- Maintained by ODOT
- Length: 1.40 mi (2.25 km)
- Existed: November 13, 2002–present

Major junctions
- South end: OR 126 Bus. in Springfield
- North end: OR 126 in Springfield

Location
- Country: United States
- State: Oregon
- County: Lane

Highway system
- Oregon Highways; Interstate; US; State; Named; Scenic
← OR 501	→ OR 540

Oregon Route 528 (OR 528) is an Oregon state highway running from OR 126 Business to OR 126. The entire route is within the city of Springfield. OR 528 is also known as the Springfield Highway No. 228 (see Oregon highways and routes). It is just 1.40 miles (2.25 km) long and runs north–south.

OR 528 was established on November 13, 2002 as part of Oregon's project to assign route numbers to highways that previously were not assigned. It is currently the shortest signed route in the State of Oregon.

== Route description ==
OR 528 begins as a one-way pair in downtown Springfield on Pioneer Parkway East (northbound direction) and Pioneer Parkway West (southbound). The route begins at South A Street which also carries eastbound OR 126 Business. One block north, the route intersects Main Street, OR 126 Business westbound. The two directions of travel are separated by a city block and head due north until F Street where the route curves to the north-northwest and move closer together, separated by a small park. OR 528 ends at an interchange with OR 126 though the Pioneer Parkway continues north as a municipally-maintained street.

The entire route carries two lanes in each direction. The route also has an additional lane in the center of the right of way each way dedicated to the Emerald Express Gateway Line for bus rapid transit. South of F Street, the bus lanes can also be used by cars to make left turns.

== History ==
OR 528 was assigned to the Springfield Highway in 2002. No changes have occurred to the designation since then.

== Major intersections ==
The entire route is in Springfield, Lane County.

mi	km	Destinations	Notes
0.00	0.00	OR 126 Bus. east (South A Street) – Bend	
0.03	0.048	OR 126 Bus. west (Main Street) – Eugene	
1.04– 1.40	1.67– 2.25	OR 126 (McKenzie Highway) to I-5 / Pioneer Parkway / Q Street – Bend, Eugene	Interchange
1.000 mi = 1.609 km; 1.000 km = 0.621 mi
