= Oregon Route 429 =

State highway in Klamath County, Oregon, US

Oregon Route 429
- Route 429 highlighted in red

Route information
- Maintained by ODOT
- Length: 2.39 mi (3.85 km)
- Existed: 2002–present

Major junctions
- South end: Lava Odell Road in Crescent Lake
- North end: OR 58 in Crescent Lake Junction

Location
- Country: United States
- State: Oregon
- County: Klamath

Highway system
- Oregon Highways; Interstate; US; State; Named; Scenic
← OR 422	→ OR 451

Oregon Route 429 (OR 429) is an Oregon state highway running from OR 58 at Crescent Lake Junction to Lava Odell Road in Crescent Lake. OR 429 is known as the Crescent Lake Highway No. 429 (see Oregon highways and routes). It is 2.39 miles (3.85 km) long and runs northeast to southwest, entirely within Klamath County.

OR 429 was established in 2002 as part of Oregon's project to assign route numbers to highways that previously were not assigned, and, as of July 2020, was unsigned.

== Route description ==
OR 429 begins at an intersection with OR 58 at Crescent Lake Junction and heads southwest to Crescent Lake, where it ends at an intersection with Lava Odell Road.

== History ==
OR 429 was assigned to the Crescent Lake Highway in 2002.

== Major intersections ==
The entire route is in Klamath County.

Location	mi	km	Destinations	Notes
Crescent Lake	0.00	0.00	Lava Odell Road	
Crescent Lake Junction	2.39	3.85	OR 58	
1.000 mi = 1.609 km; 1.000 km = 0.621 mi
