= Oregon Route 251 =

State highway in Curry County, Oregon, US

Oregon Route 251
- Route 251 highlighted in red

Route information
- Maintained by ODOT
- Length: 0.76 mi (1,220 m)
- Existed: 2002–present

Major junctions
- West end: Port Orford Heads State Park
- East end: US 101 in Port Orford

Location
- Country: United States
- State: Oregon
- County: Curry

Highway system
- Oregon Highways; Interstate; US; State; Named; Scenic
← OR 250	→ OR 255

Oregon Route 251 is an Oregon state highway running from Port Orford Heads State Park to Port Orford. OR 251 is known as the Port Orford Highway No. 251 (see Oregon highways and routes). It is 0.76 miles (1.22 km) long and runs east–west, entirely within Curry County and mostly within the Port Orford city limits.

OR 251 was established in 2002 as part of Oregon's project to assign route numbers to highways that previously were not assigned, and, as of August 2024, was unsigned.

== Route description ==
OR 251 begins at the eastern boundary of Port Orford Heads State Park and heads east to Port Orford, ending at an intersection with US 101.

== History ==
OR 251 was assigned to the Port Orford Highway in 2002.

== Major intersections ==
The entire route is in Curry County.

Location	mi	km	Destinations	Notes
	0.00	0.00	Port Orford Heads State Park	Western terminus
Port Orford	0.76	1.22	US 101	Eastern terminus
1.000 mi = 1.609 km; 1.000 km = 0.621 mi
