= Oregon Route 104 =

State highway in Clatsop County, Oregon, United States

Oregon Route 104
- Fort Stevens Highway No. 104
- Route 104; mainline in red, spur route in blue

Route information
- Maintained by ODOT
- Length: 6.03 mi (9.70 km)
- Existed: 2002–present

Major junctions
- South end: US 101 near Warrenton
- OR 104S in Warrenton
- North end: Fort Stevens State Park in Warrenton

Location
- Country: United States
- State: Oregon
- Counties: Clatsop

Highway system
- Oregon Highways; Interstate; US; State; Named; Scenic
← OR 103	→ OR 104S

Oregon Route 104 (OR 104) is a state highway in Clatsop County, Oregon, United States. It is 6.03 miles (9.70 km) long and connects US Route 101 (US 101) south of Warrenton with Fort Stevens State Park in Warrenton. OR 104 is known as the Fort Stevens Highway No. 104 (see Oregon highways and routes).

The OR 104 designation was applied to the Fort Stevens Highway in 2002 as part of Oregon's project to assign route numbers to highways that did not have route numbers.

== Route description ==
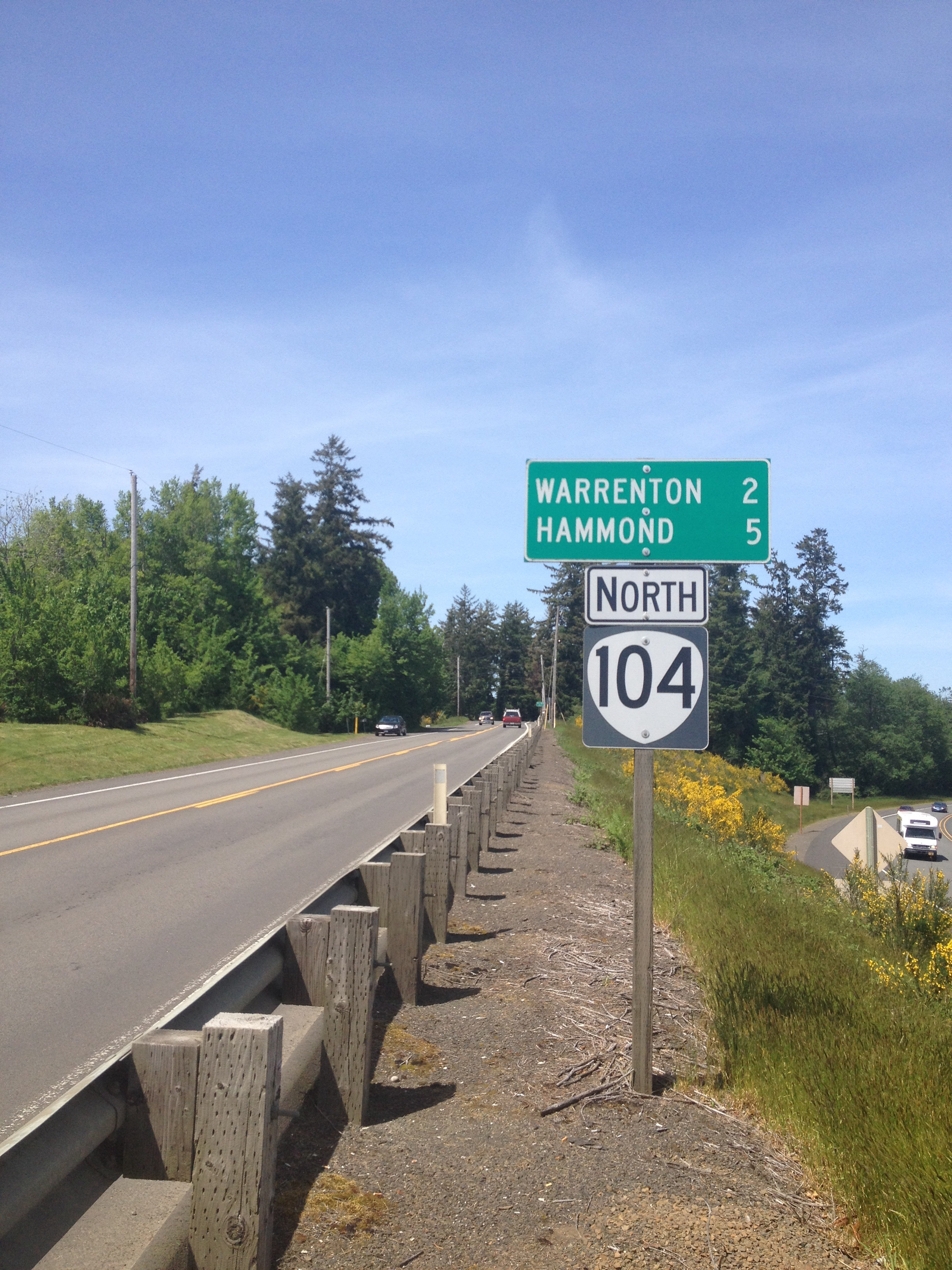
North along OR 104 from its southern terminus, May 2014

The southern terminus of OR 104 is at a junction with US 101 near south of Warrenton. It heads due north for 6 miles (9.7 km), ending at the entrance to Fort Stevens State Park near Hammond. The southern portion of the route constitutes an old portion of US 101. The spur, known as the Fort Stevens Spur No. 485, also constitutes an old portion of US 101.

== History ==
The Fort Stevens Highway No. 104 was established as a secondary highway on December 30, 1946. On February 19, 1981, OR 104 was extended southward to an old alignment of US 101, while US 101 was moved to a new alignment. On September 19, 2002, OR 104 was assigned to the Fort Stevens Highway.

== Major intersections ==
The entire route is in Clatsop County.

Location	mi	km	Destinations	Notes
	6.03	9.70	Perkins Lane east	Continuation east from southern terminus
	6.03	9.70	US 101 (Oregon Coast Highway) – Warrenton, Astoria, Gearhart, Seaside	Southern terminus
Warrenton	4.43	7.13	OR 104S east (Fort Stevens Highway Spur)	
Warrenton	3.32	5.34	East Harbor Street (Warrenton-Astoria Highway)	
Warrenton	0.00	0.00	Fort Stevens State Park	Northern terminus
1.000 mi = 1.609 km; 1.000 km = 0.621 mi

== Spur route ==
Oregon Route 104S
- Location: Warrenton
- Length: 0.95 mi (1,530 m)
- Existed: 2002–present

Oregon Route 104S (OR 104S), also known as Fort Stevens Spur No. 485, is a 0.95-mile (1.53 km) spur route of OR 104 in Warrenton, that connects OR 104 with US 101.

== See also ==
- List of numbered state routes in Oregon
