= List of named state highways in Oregon =

Named Highways of the Oregon Highway System

System information
- Maintained by ODOT
- Formed: 1917

Highway names
- Interstates: Interstate nn (I-nn)
- US Highways: U.S. Route nn (US nn)
- State: Oregon Route nn (OR nn)
- Named highways: xx Highway No. nn

System links
- Oregon Highways; Interstate; US; State; Named; Scenic

In the U.S. state of Oregon, there are two systems for categorizing roads in the state highway system: named state highways and numbered state routes. Named highways, such as the Pacific Highway No. 1 or the North Umpqua Highway East No. 138, are primarily used internally by the Oregon Department of Transportation (ODOT) whereas numbered routes, such as Interstate 5 (I-5), U.S. Highway 20 (US 20), or Oregon Route 140 (OR 140), are posted on road signs and route markers. The two systems overlap significantly, but the route numbers are not necessarily coterminous with highway names and some routes may comprise several highways. For example, OR 47 is overlaid on the Mist–Clatskanie Highway No. 110, Nehalem Highway No. 102, and Tualatin Valley Highway No. 29. In addition to OR 47, the Tualatin Valley Highway No. 29 also comprises part of OR 8.

The primary state highway system was designated in 1917 with 36 highways, some of which were designated by the Oregon State Legislature and the rest were added by the Oregon State Highway Commission. Starting in 1931, the highway commission took over maintenance of several county "market roads" that became the secondary state highway system. State highways have a route number that is used internally by ODOT; primary highways have a one- or two-digit route number (i.e., the Columbia River Highway No. 2 or the Pendleton–John Day Highway No. 28) and secondary highways have a three digit route number (i.e., the Jefferson Highway No. 164). Secondary highways are numbered by county; each county has a range of ten numbers. For instance, Highways 330 to 339 are in Umatilla County.

== List of state highways ==
Highway	Length (mi)	Length (km)	Southern or western terminus	Northern or eastern terminus	Associated numbered routes	Formed	Removed	Notes
Pacific Highway No. 1	308.37	496.27	I-5 near Ashland	I-5 at Portland	I-5, US 30, OR 99E, OR 138	1917	current	
Columbia River Highway No. 2	200.95	323.40	I-5 in Portland	US 730 near Umatilla	I-84, US 30, US 395, US 730	1917	current	
Oswego Highway No. 3	11.49	18.49	US 26 in Portland	OR 99E in Oregon City	OR 43	1937	current	
The Dalles–California Highway No. 4	281.36	452.81	US 97 near Dorris, California	US 197 at The Dalles	US 26, US 30, US 97, US 197, OR 216	1917	current	
John Day Highway No. 5	273.32	439.87	I-84 / US 30 in Arlington	US 20 in Vale	US 26, US 395, OR 19, OR 206, OR 207	1917	current	Formerly known as the John Day River Hwy. No. 5 from 1917 to 1921.
Old Oregon Trail Highway No. 6	210.43	338.65	US 730 near Boardman	I-84 at Ontario	I-84, US 30, US 395, OR 203	1917	current	
Central Oregon Highway No. 7	263.85	424.63	US 97 Bus. in Bend	US 20 / US 26 at Nyssa	US 20, US 26, US 395, OR 201	1917	current	
Oregon–Washington Highway No. 8	34.06	54.81	I-84 near Pendleton	SR 125 near Walla Walla, Washington	US 30, OR 11	1917	current	
Oregon Coast Highway No. 9	346.80	558.12	US 101 near Brookings	US 101 near Astoria	US 101, OR 255	1921	current	Formerly known as the Coast Hwy. No. 3 from 1917-1921, and the Roosevelt Coast Hwy. No. 9 from 1921-1932.
Wallowa Lake Highway No. 10	70.74	113.84	US 30 in La Grande	OR 350 / OR 351 in Joseph	OR 82	1917	current	Formerly known as the La Grande-Enterprise Hwy. No. 10 from 1917-1922, the La Grande-Joseph Hwy. No. 10 from 1917-1923, and the La Grande-Wallowa Lake Hwy. No. 10 from 1922-1930.
Enterprise–Lewiston Highway No. 11	43.13	69.41	OR 82 in Enterprise	SR 129 near Paradise	OR 3	1917	current	Formerly known as the Enterprise-Flora Hwy. No. 11 from 1917-1936.
Baker–Copperfield Highway No. 12	69.13	111.25	US 30 in Baker City	Oregon–Idaho state line at Oxbow	OR 7, OR 86	1917	current	Formerly known as the Baker-Cornucopia Hwy. No. 12 from 1917-1934, and the Baker-Homestead Hwy. No. 12 from 1934-1937.
Baker–Unity Highway No. 13	45.73	73.60	US 26 near Unity	US 30 in Baker City	OR 7, OR 245	1917	1980	
Crooked River Highway No. 14	42.89	69.02	US 26 in Prineville	US 20 near Brothers	OR 27	1927	current	Formerly known as the Prineville-Bear Creek Hwy. No. 14 from 1928-1930
Shaniko–Mitchell Highway No. 14	—	—	Highway No. 41 at Mitchell	Highway No. 42 at Shaniko	—	1917	1927	
McKenzie Highway No. 15	110.15	177.27	I-5 / OR 99 in Eugene	US 97 in Redmond	US 20, OR 126, OR 126 Bus., OR 242	1917	current	Formerly known as the McKenzie River Hwy. No. 15 from 1917 from 1922.
Santiam Highway No. 16	100.15	161.18	OR 99E at Goshen	OR 242 in Sisters	US 20, OR 126	1917	current	Formerly known as the Albany-Sisters Hwy. No. 16 from 1917-1921.
McKenzie–Bend Highway No. 17	20.99	33.78	OR 126 in Sisters	US 20 / US 97 Bus. in Bend	US 20, US 97 Bus.	1917	current	Formerly known as the Bend-Sisters Hwy. No. 17 from 1917-1921.
Willamette Highway No. 18	86.85	139.77	I-5 / OR 99 at Goshen	US 97 near Chemult	OR 58, OR 99	1922	current	
Lakeview–Burns Highway No. 18	—	—	Highway No. 19 at Lakeview	Highway No. 7 at Burns	—	1917	1922	
Fremont Highway No. 19	157.73	253.84	US 395 at New Pine Creek	US 97 near La Pine	US 395, OR 31, OR 140	1917	current	Formerly known as the La Pine-Lakeview Hwy. No. 19 from 1917-1922, and the Prineville-Lakeview Hwy. No. 19 from 1922-1927.
Klamath Falls–Lakeview Highway No. 20	93.61	150.65	US 97 in Klamath Falls	US 395 in Lakeview	OR 39, OR 140	1917	current	
Green Springs Highway No. 21	58.82	94.66	OR 99 in Ashland	US 97 near Klamath Falls	OR 66, OR 140	1917	current	Formerly known as the Ashland-Klamath falls Hwy. No. 21 from 1917 to 1929
Crater Lake Highway No. 22	83.58	134.51	OR 99 / OR 238 in Medford	US 97 near Chiloquin	OR 62	1917	current	Formerly known as the Medford-Crater Lake Hwy. No. 22 from 1917-1924.
Dairy–Bonanza Highway No. 23	6.97	11.22	OR 140 at Dairy	Bonanza	OR 70	c. 1926	current	
Klamath–Crater Lake Highway No. 23	18	29	Highway No. 4 at Fort Klamath	Highway No. 22 near Crater Lake	OR 62	1917	1924	
Burns–Crane Highway No. 24	29	47	US 20 in Burns	Crane	OR 78	c. 1926	1965	
The Rim Highway No. 24	32	51	Ring road around Crater Lake		—	1917	1926	
Redwood Highway No. 25	43.88	70.62	I-5 in Grants Pass	US 199 near O'Brien	US 199, OR 99	1917	current	Formerly known as the Grants Pass-Crescent City Hwy. No. 25 before 1924.
Mount Hood Highway No. 26	89.58	144.17	OR 10 / OR 99W in Portland	US 30 at Hood River	US 26, OR 35	1917	current	Formerly known as the Mt. Hood Loop before 1931.
Alsea Highway No. 27	56.61	91.10	US 101 in Waldport	US 20 near Philomath	OR 34	1921	current	
Clackamas Highway No. 27	21	34	Highway No. 1 at Oregon City	Highway No. 26 at Pleasant Home	—	1917	c. 1920	
Pendleton–John Day Highway No. 28	118.47	190.66	US 26 in Mount Vernon	OR 37 in Pendleton	US 395, OR 37	1917	current	Formerly known as the Pendleton–John Day Highway No. 9 in 1917
Tualatin Valley Highway No. 29	40.94	65.89	OR 99W in McMinnville	US 26 near Beaverton	OR 8, OR 47	1917	current	Formerly known as the Forest Grove-McMinnville Hwy. No. 29 from 1917-1920
Willamina–Salem Highway No. 30	25.92	41.71	OR 18 near Willamina	OR 99E in Salem	OR 22	1917	current	Formerly known as the Salem-Independence Hwy. No. 30 from 1917-1919, and the Salem-Dallas Hwy. No. 30 from 1919-1953
Albany–Corvallis Highway No. 31	11.18	17.99	US 20 in Corvallis	OR 99E in Albany	US 20	1917	current	
Mount Hood–Clear Lake Highway No. 31	8	13	Clear Lake	Highway No. 26 near Government Camp	US 26	1917	1922	
Three Rivers Highway No. 32	24.97	40.19	US 101 at Hebo	OR 18 at Valley Junction	OR 22	1917	current	Formerly known as the Yamhill-Nestucca Hwy. No. 32 from 1917-1920 and the McMinnville-Tillamook Hwy. No. 32 from 1920-1939.
Corvallis–Newport Highway No. 33	49.30	79.34	US 101 in Newport	OR 99W in Corvallis	US 20, OR 34	1917	current	
Siuslaw Highway No. 34	65.98	106.18	US 101 in Florence	OR 99 at Junction City	OR 126, OR 36	1917	1966	Formerly known as the Eugene-Florence Hwy. No. 34 from 1917-1920, and the Willamette Valley-Florence Hwy. No. 34 from 1920-1928
Coos Bay–Roseburg Highway No. 35	73.32	118.00	US 101 near Coquille	I-5 near Roseburg	OR 42, OR 99	1917	current	
Pendleton–Cold Springs Highway No. 36	30.44	48.99	Columbia River near Cold Springs Junction	US 30 near Pendleton	OR 37	1917	current	
Wilson River Highway No. 37	51.25	82.48	US 101 / OR 131 in Tillamook	US 26 near North Plains	OR 6	1931	current	
Crooked River Highway No. 37	55	89	US 26 in Prineville	Paulina	OR 380	1920	1922	
Umatilla Cutoff Highway No. 37	20	32	US 30 at Umatilla	US 730 near Umatilla	US 730	1922	1932	
Oregon Caves Highway No. 38	19.33	31.11	US 199 in Cave Junction	Oregon Caves National Monument and Preserve	OR 46	1922	current	
Tiller–Summit Forest Road Highway No. 38	25	40	Jackson–Douglas County county line	Tiller	OR 227	c. 1920	1922	
Salmon River Highway No. 39	57.94	93.25	US 101 near Otis Junction	OR 99W near Dayton	OR 18, OR 22, OR 233	1930	current	
Deschutes Highway No. 39	0.5	0.80	US 30 at the Deschutes River bridge	Oregon Trunk Railway crossing	—	1920	1952	Formerly known as the Deschutes River Hwy. from 1920-1922.
Beaverton–Hillsdale Highway No. 40	2.44	3.93	OR 217 in Beaverton	Washington–Multnomah county line at Portland	OR 10	c. 1920	current	Formerly known as Canyon road in 1920 and the Bertha-Beaverton Hwy. from 1920-1936.
Ochoco Highway No. 41	97.06	156.20	US 97 in Redmond	OR 19 near Dayville	US 26, OR 126	1921	current	
Sherman Highway No. 42	68.39	110.06	US 197 near Cow Canyon	US 97 near Biggs Junction	US 97	1921	current	
Monmouth–Independence Highway No. 43	2.35	3.78	OR 99W / OR 194 in Monmouth	OR 51 in Independence	OR 51	c. 1922	current	
Wapinitia Highway No. 44	25.85	41.60	US 26 near Bear Springs Group Campground	US 197 near Maupin	OR 216	c. 1924	current	
Umpqua Highway No. 45	56.89	91.56	US 101 in Reedsport	I-5 / OR 99 at Anlauf	OR 38, OR 99	1931	current	
Necanicum Highway No. 46	18.91	30.43	US 101 near Wheeler	US 26 at Necanicum	OR 53	1931	current	
East Portland–Oregon City Highway No. 46	12	19	US 99E in Oregon City	US 99E in Portland	OR 99E	1931	1937	
Sunset Highway No. 47	74.07	119.20	US 101 near Seaside	I-405 in Portland	US 26, OR 47	1932	current	Formerly known as the Wolf Creek Hwy. from 1932-1946.
John Day–Burns Highway No. 48	67.33	108.36	US 20 near Burns	US 26 in John Day	US 395	1933	current	
Lakeview–Burns Highway No. 49	88.85	142.99	OR 31 at Valley Falls	US 20 near Riley	US 395	1933	current	
Klamath Falls–Malin Highway No. 50	31.73	51.06	CR 114 near Malin	US 97 in Klamath Falls	US 97 Bus., OR 39, OR 140	1939	current	
Klamath Falls–Weed Highway No. 50	16	26	US 97 near Dorris, California	Main Street in Klamath Falls	US 97	1933	1939	
Wilsonville–Hubbard Highway No. 51	5.94	9.56	I-5 at Wilsonville	OR 99E near Aurora	OR 551	1937	current	Formerly known as the West Portland-Hubbard Hwy. from 1937-1954
Heppner Highway No. 52	83.09	133.72	I-84 / US 30 near Arlington	US 395 at Nye	OR 74, OR 207	1939	current	
Warm Springs Highway No. 53	60.11	96.74	US 97 at Madras	OR 35 near Government Camp	US 26	1940	current	
Umatilla–Stanfield Highway No. 54	12.86	20.70	I-84 / US 30 near Stanfield	US 730 at Umatilla	US 395	c. 1954	current	
Boardman–Stanfield Highway No. 54	23	37	US 730 near Boardman	US 395 near Echo	US 30	1940	1954	
Halfway Highway No. 55	11.68	18.80	OR 86 near Richland	Halfway	OR 86	1941	1959	
T.H. Banfield Expressway No. 56	12	19	Burnside Bridge in Portland	US 30 Byp. in Portland	I-84	1948	1957	Formerly known as the Sullivan Gulch Highway from 1948-1952
Portland–Salem Expressway No. 57	33	53	US 99E near Salem	US 99E near Portland	I-5	1952	1957	
Albany–Junction City Highway No. 58	32.37	52.09	OR 99 / OR 99W in Junction City	I-5 in Albany	US 20, OR 99E	1958	current	
Sandy Boulevard Highway No. 59	5.51	8.87	OR 99E in Portland	I-205 / US 30 Byp. in Portland	US 30 Bus.	1958	2003	
Rogue River Highway No. 60	14.95	24.06	US 199 in Grants Pass	I-5 / OR 234 at Rock Point	OR 99	1959	current	
Stadium Freeway No. 61	4.25	6.84	I-5 in Portland	I-5 / US 30 in Portland	I-405, US 26, US 30	1961	current	
Florence–Eugene Highway No. 62	52.65	84.73	US 101 in Florence	OR 99 in Eugene	OR 126	1966	current	
Rogue Valley Highway No. 63	17.45	28.08	I-5 at Ashland	I-5 at Seven Oaks	OR 99	1962	current	
East Portland Freeway No. 64	26.56	42.74	I-5 in Tualatin	I-205 at Vancouver, Washington	I-205, OR 213	1966	current	
Salem Freeway No. 65	—	—	Salem	I-5 at Salem	I-305	1968	1976	
La Grande–Baker Highway No. 66	54.50	87.71	I-84 near Baker City	I-84 near La Grande	US 30, OR 7, OR 203, OR 237	1968	current	
Pendleton Highway No. 67	5.93	9.54	I-84 / US 395 near Pendleton	I-84 near Pendleton	US 30, OR 37	1969	current	
Cascade Highway North No. 68	10.32	16.61	I-205 / OR 214 / OR 224 near Milwaukie	Portland International Airport	OR 213	1971	current	
Beltline Highway No. 69	13.00	20.92	OR 126 at Eugene	I-5 in Springfield	OR 126, OR 569	1978	current	
McNary Highway No. 70	11.21	18.04	I-84 / US 30 near Hermiston	I-82 near Umatilla	I-82, US 395	1979	current	
Whitney Highway No. 71	50.96	82.01	US 26 near Austin	US 30 in Baker City	OR 7	1980	current	
Salem Highway No. 72	8.48	13.65	I-5 at Salem	I-5 at Salem	OR 22, OR 99E	1985	current	
North Umpqua Highway No. 73	81.30	130.84	I-5 at Roseburg	OR 138 near Crater Lake National Park	OR 138	1985	2003	
Sunrise Expressway No. 75	2.15	3.46	I-205 / OR 214 / OR 224 near Milwaukie	OR 212 in Happy Valley	OR 224	—	—	
Pacific Highway East No. 81	47.35	76.20	I-5 in Salem	I-5 / OR 120 in North Portland	OR 99E, OR 214	1937	current	
Pacific Highway West No. 91	118.58	190.84	I-5 / OR 126 in Eugene	I-5 in North Portland	US 20, OR 10, OR 34, OR 99, OR 99W, OR 219	1917	current	Formerly known as West Side Highway No. 28 from 1917-1922, and West Side Pacific Highway No. 3 from 1922-1937
Lower Columbia River Highway No. 92	94.91	152.74	US 101 in Astoria	I-405 in Portland	US 30	1974	current	Formerly known as the Columbia River West Hwy. from 1958-1961, and the Lower Columbia River West Hwy. from 1961 to an unknown date.
Historic Columbia River Highway No. 100	42.79	68.86	I-84 at Troutdale	US 30 in The Dalles	US 30, OR 35	1993	current	
Nehalem Highway No. 102	86.47	139.16	OR 8 in Forest Grove	US 101 in Astoria	US 101 Bus., OR 47, OR 202	1931	current	
Fishhawk Falls Highway No. 103	9.02	14.52	US 26 near Elsie	OR 202 at Jewell	OR 103	1941	current	
Fort Stevens Highway No. 104	6.03	9.70	US 101 near Warrenton	Fort Stevens State Park	OR 104	1946	current	
Warrenton–Astoria Highway No. 105	7.25	11.67	OR 104 in Warrenton	US 101 / OR 202 in Astoria	US 101 Bus.	1946	current	Formerly known as the Warrenton Hwy. from 1946-1964
Mist–Clatskanie Highway No. 110	11.89	19.14	OR 202 at Mist	US 30 in Clatskanie	OR 47	1932	current	
Swift Highway No. 120	0.28	0.45	Columbia Slough in Portland	I-5 / OR 99E in Portland	OR 120	1931	current	
Lombard Street Highway No. 121	0.71	1.14	OR 99E in Portland	Columbia Boulevard in Portland	—	1934	1942	
Vancouver Highway No. 122	0.56	0.90	Columbia Boulevard in Portland	OR 99E in Portland	—	—	1986	
Northeast Portland Highway No. 123	14.76	23.75	US 30 in Portland	I-84 / US 30 in Gresham	US 30 Byp.	1937	current	
Sun Dial Highway No. 124	1.3	2.1	US 30 near Troutdale	Sundial Beach	—	1941	1965	
Crown Point Highway No. 125	23.96	38.56	I-84 / US 30 at Troutdale	I-84 / US 30 near Dodson	US 30	1949	1993	
Cornelius Pass Highway No. 127	7.95	12.79	US 26 in Hillsboro	US 30 near Burlington	OR 127	2021	current	
Little Nestucca Highway No. 130	9.40	15.13	US 101 near Oretown	OR 22 at Dolph	OR 130	1932	current	
Netarts Highway No. 131	9.08	14.61	Oceanside	US 101 / OR 6 in Tillamook	OR 131	1940	current	
Delta Highway No. 132	1.6	2.6	OR 569 in Eugene	I-105 in Eugene	OR 132	1964	current	
North Umpqua Highway East No. 138	101.89	163.98	I-5 in Roseburg	US 97 near Chemult	OR 99, OR 138	2003	current	
Hillsboro–Silverton Highway No. 140	50.13	80.68	OR 213 in Silverton	I-5 in Woodburn	OR 214, OR 219	1931	current	Formerly known as the Hillsboro-Woodburn Hwy. from 1931-1948
Beaverton–Tualatin Highway No. 141	6.35	10.22	I-5 in Wilsonville	OR 217 in Beaverton	OR 141	1931	current	Formerly known as the Beaverton-Aroura Hwy. from 1931-1955
Farmington Highway No. 142	1.50	2.41	SW 197th Avenue near Beaverton	OR 10 near Beaverton	OR 10	1932	current	
Scholls Highway No. 143	0.57	0.92	OR 219 at Scholls	OR 10 near Hillsdale	OR 210	1932	current	
Beaverton–Tigard Highway No. 144	7.52	12.10	I-5 near Tigard	US 26 at Cedar Hills	OR 217	1960	current	
Salem–Dayton Highway No. 150	20.74	33.38	OR 22 in Salem	OR 18 near Dayton	OR 221	1931	current	
Yamhill–Newberg Highway No. 151	11.50	18.51	OR 47 in Yamhill	OR 99W at Newberg	OR 240	1931	current	
Three Mile Lane Highway No. 152	7.45	11.99	OR 99W in McMinnville	OR 99W near Dayton	OR 18	1931	1967	
Bellevue–Hopewell Highway No. 153	14.29	23.00	OR 18 at Bellevue	OR 221 near Hopewell	OR 153	1931	current	
Lafayette Highway No. 154	6.26	10.07	OR 153 near Hopewell	OR 18 near Dayton	OR 154, OR 233	1931	current	
Amity–Dayton Highway No. 155	9.19	14.79	OR 99W near Amity	OR 221 in Dayton	OR 233	1936	current	
McMinnville Highway No. 156	1.80	2.90	OR 99W in McMinnville	OR 99W near McMinnville	OR 99W	1941	1999	
Willamina–Sheridan Highway No. 157	8.56	13.78	OR 18 / OR 22 near Willamina	OR 18 near Willamina	OR 18 Bus.	1959	current	
Cascade Highway South No. 160	29.93	48.17	OR 214 in Silverton	I-205 in Oregon City	OR 213	1931	current	Formerly known as the Cascade Hwy. from 1931-1971
Woodburn–Estacada Highway No. 161	33.28	53.56	OR 99E near Woodburn	OR 224 in Estacada	OR 211	1931	current	Formerly known as the Woodburn-Mt. Hood Loop Hwy. from 1931-1940 and the Woodburn-Sandy Hwy. from 1940-1947.
North Santiam Highway No. 162	80.64	129.78	I-5 / OR 99E in Salem	US 20 / OR 126 near Suttle Lake	OR 22	1931	current	
Silver Creek Falls Highway No. 163	32.06	51.60	OR 22 near Shaw	OR 213 in Silverton	OR 214	1931	current	
Jefferson Highway No. 164	8.54	13.74	I-5 / OR 99E near Jefferson	I-5 / OR 99E near Millersburg	OR 164	1945	current	
Butteville Road–Hubbard Highway No. 164	4	6.4	Near Aurora	Marion–Clakamas county line near Aurora	—	1936	—	
Aumsville–Mehama Highway No. 165	16.43	26.44	OR 22 near Aumsville	OR 22 near Mehama	OR 22	1961	1967	
Canby–Marquam Highway No. 170	8.1	13.0	OR 211 near Molalla	OR 99E in Canby	—	1941	1994	
Clackamas Highway No. 171	48.54	78.12	Rainbow Campground near Ripplebrook	OR 99E in Milwaukie	OR 211, OR 212, OR 213, OR 224	1947	current	
Eagle Creek–Sandy Highway No. 172	6.17	9.93	OR 211 / OR 244 at Eagle Creek	US 26 in Sandy	OR 211	1947	current	
Timberline Highway No. 173	5.32	8.56	US 26 near Government Camp	Timberline Lodge	OR 173	1950	current	
Clackamas–Boring Highway No. 174	8.84	14.23	OR 224 at Damascus	US 26 near Boring	OR 212	1977	current	
Eddyville–Blodgett Highway No. 180	19.18	30.87	US 20 in Eddyville	US 20 in Blodgett	OR 180	1931	current	
Siletz Highway No. 181	31.00	49.89	US 20 near Toledo	US 101 at Kernville	OR 229	1931	current	
Otter Rock Highway No. 182	0.75	1.21	Devils Punch Bowl State Park at Otter Rock	US 101 at Otter Rock	US 101	1947	2005	
Dallas–Rickreall Highway No. 189	4.32	6.95	OR 223 in Dallas	OR 22 at Rickreall	OR 223S	1953	current	
Kings Valley Highway No. 190	25.4	40.9	US 20 near Wren	US 99W near Monmouth	OR 223, OR 224	—	1944	
Kings Valley Highway No. 191	31.40	50.53	US 20 near Wren	OR 22 near Dallas	OR 223	1931	current	Formerly known as the Dallas-Kings Valley Hwy. from 1931-1946.
Dallas–Dolph Corner Highway No. 192	2.82	4.54	OR 22 / OR 223 in Dallas	OR 22 near Dallas	OR 223	1931	1963	Formerly known as the Dallas-Coast Hwy. from 1931-1954.
Independence Highway No. 193	6.34	10.20	OR 51 in Independence	OR 22 near Salem	OR 51	1931	current	Formerly known as the Brunks Corner-Independence Hwy. from 1931-1935
Monmouth Highway No. 194	7.56	12.17	OR 223 near Bridgeport	OR 99W in Independence	OR 194	1944	current	
Territorial Highway No. 200	2.06	3.32	Lane–Douglas county line near Mill Camp	OR 99W in Monroe	OR 200	1931	current	
Alsea–Deadwood Highway No. 201	9.49	15.27	Lobster Valley Road near Alsea	OR 34 at Alsea	OR 501	1931	current	
Tampico–Lewisville Highway No. 202	3.2	5.1	US 99W near Corvallis	Benton–Polk county line near Lewisville	—	1936	1951	
Corvallis–Lebanon Highway No. 210	18.09	29.11	OR 99W in Corvallis	US 20 in Lebanon	US 20, OR 34	1931	current	
Albany–Lyons Highway No. 211	25.28	40.68	US 26 near Crabtree	OR 22 at Mehama	OR 226	1931	current	
Halsey–Sweet Home Highway No. 212	21.40	34.44	OR 99E in Halsey	US 20 in Sweet Home	OR 228	1931	current	
Mehama–Mill City Highway No. 213	8.9	14.3	OR 22 in Mehama	OR 22 in Mill City	OR 226	1943	1961	
Albany Airport Highway No. 214	1.05	1.69	US 20 in Albany	US 99E in Albany	—	1941	1958	
Clear Lake–Belknap Springs Highway No. 215	19.81	31.88	OR 242 near Belknap Springs	US 20 near Santiam Junction	OR 126	1955	current	
Mapleton–Eugene Highway No. 220	45.14	72.65	OR 36 in Mapleton	US 99 in Eugene	OR 126	1931	1966	Formerly known as the Eugene-Maplehome Hwy. from 1931-1941, and the Richardson-Eugene Hwy. from 1941-1960.
Fox Hollow Highway No. 221	15.5	24.9	US 99 near Walker	Eugene city limits	—	1931	1955	
Springfield–Creswell Highway No. 222	6.14	9.88	OR 99 at Creswell	Jasper–Lowell Road and Lowell Road at Jasper	OR 222	1931	current	Formerly known as the Springfield-Cottage Grove Hwy. from 1931-1938.
Junction City–Eugene Highway No. 223	13.1	21.1	OR 99 / OR 126 in Eugene	OR 99 in Junction City	OR 99	1935	1994	
W. 7th Street–W. 11th Street Highway No. 224	0.82	1.32	W. 11th Street in Eugene	US 99 in Eugene	OR 126	1940	1955	
McVay Highway No. 225	1.97	3.17	I-5 / OR 99 near Springfield	Franklin Boulevard in Springfield	OR 225	1951	current	
Goshen–Divide Highway No. 226	19.87	31.98	I-5 near Cottage Grove	I-5 / OR 58 at Goshen	OR 99	1957	current	
Eugene–Springfield Highway No. 227	9.97	16.05	OR 99 / OR 126B in Eugene	OR 126B in Springfield	I-105, OR 126	1955	current	
Springfield Highway No. 228	1.40	2.25	OR 126B in Springfield	OR 126 in Springfield	OR 528	1960	current	
Mapleton–Junction City Highway No. 229	51.58	83.01	OR 126 in Mapleton	OR 99 near Junction City	OR 36	1966	current	
Tiller–Trail Highway No. 230	51.5	82.9	I-5 / OR 99 at Canyonville	OR 62 at Trail	OR 42	1931	current	
Elkton–Sutherlin Highway No. 231	24.48	39.40	OR 99 in Sutherlin	OR 38 in Elkton	OR 138	1931	current	
Crater Lake North Highway No. 232	4.45	7.16	Douglas–Klamath county line at Crater Lake National Park	OR 230 near Diamond Lake	OR 138	1937	1984	
West Diamond Lake Highway No. 233	23.80	38.30	OR 62 near Union Creek	OR 138 near Diamond Lake	OR 230	1937	current	
Oakland–Shady Highway No. 234	22.26	35.82	OR 42 near Winston	I-5 at Oakland	OR 99	1956	2006	
Dillard Highway No. 235	8.10	13.04	I-5 / OR 99 near Myrtle Creek	OR 42 at Winston	OR 99	1957	1985	
Drain–Yoncalla Highway No. 236	7.65	12.31	I-5 / OR 99 near Yoncalla	OR 38 at Drain	OR 99	1956	1985	
Myrtle Creek Highway No. 237	5.03	8.10	I-5 / OR 99 near Riddle	I-5 / OR 99 at Myrtle Creek	OR 99	1959	1985	
Cape Arago Highway No. 240	8.74	14.07	Cape Arago State Park	US 101 in North Bend	OR 540	1931	current	
Coos River Highway No. 241	17.57	28.28	US 101 near Coos Bay	Millcoma Road near Coos Bay	OR 241	1931	current	
Powers Highway No. 242	18.68	30.06	CR 219 near Powers	OR 42 near Myrtle Point	OR 542	1931	current	
Empire–Coos Bay Highway No. 243	3.58	5.76	OR 540 in Empire	US 101 in Coos Bay	—	1936	2001	Formerly known as the Empire Marshfield Hwy. from 1936-1952
Coquille–Bandon Highway No. 244	16.93	27.25	US 101 in Bandon	OR 42 in Coquille	OR 42S	1957	current	
Cape Blanco Highway No. 250	2.42	3.89	Cape Blanco State Park	US 101 near Port Orford	OR 250	1932	current	
Port Orford Highway No. 251	0.76	1.22	Port Orford Heads State Park	US 101 in Port Orford	OR 251	1933	current	
Carpenterville Highway No. 255	25.86	41.62	US 101 in Brookings	US 101 near Gold Beach	OR 255	1999	current	
Rogue River Loop Highway No. 260	9.31	14.98	US 199 near Grants Pass	Upper River Road in Grants Pass	OR 260	1931	current	
Williams Highway No. 261	23.10	37.18	West Fork Road near Williams	US 99 / US 199 in Grants Pass	OR 238	1931	1969	
Lake of the Woods Highway No. 270	76.91	123.77	OR 62 in White City	OR 66 near Klamath Falls	OR 140	1931	current	Formerly known as the Little Butte Hwy. from 1931-1958.
Sams Valley Highway No. 271	17.78	28.61	OR 99 at Rock Point	OR 62 near Eagle Point	OR 99, OR 234	1931	current	
Jacksonville Highway No. 272	38.67	62.23	US 199 / OR 99 in Grants Pass	OR 62 / OR 99 in Medford	OR 238	1931	current	Formerly known as the Medford Provolt Highway from 1931-1969.
Siskiyou Highway No. 273	12.42	19.99	I-5 near the California–Oregon state line	OR 66 near Ashland	OR 273	1938	current	
Interstate Bridge Highway No. 280	0.5	0.80	US 30 at Hood River	Hood River Bridge	—	1931	1937	
Hood River Highway No. 281	19.02	30.61	OR 35 in Mount Hood	US 30 in Hood River	OR 281	1931	current	
Odell Highway No. 282	3.45	5.55	OR 35 at Odell	OR 281 near Odell	OR 282	1940	current	
Cascade Locks Highway No. 283	1.27	2.04	I-84 / US 30 at Cascade Locks	I-84 / US 30 at Cascade Locks	US 30	1964	1993	
Old Columbia River Drive Highway No. 284	1.46	2.35	US 30 / OR 35 at Hood River	Historic Columbia River Highway State Trail	US 30	1986	1993	
Sherars Bridge Highway No. 290	28.47	45.82	US 197 near Tygh Valley	US 97 in Grass Valley	OR 216	1931	current	
Shaniko–Fossil Highway No. 291	42.08	67.72	US 97 at Shaniko	OR 19 in Fossil	OR 218	1931	current	
Mosier–The Dalles Highway No. 292	1.50	2.41	US 30 in The Dalles	US 197 at The Dalles	US 30	1955	current	
Antelope Highway No. 293	13.58	21.85	US 97 in Jefferson County	OR 218 in Antelope	OR 293	1971	current	
Wasco–Heppner Highway No. 300	85.82	138.11	US 97 at Wasco	OR 74 in Heppner	OR 206, OR 207	1931	current	
Celilo–Wasco Highway No. 301	15.57	25.06	I-84 / US 30 at Celilo Village	OR 206 in Wasco	OR 206	1936	current	Formerly known as the Fulton Canyon-Wasco Hwy. from 1936-1966.
Lexington–Echo Highway No. 320	37.03	59.59	OR 74 in Lexington	I-84 / US 30 / US 395 near Echo	OR 207	1931	current	
Heppner–Spray Highway No. 321	40.87	65.77	OR 19 near Spray	OR 206 at Ruggs	OR 207	1931	current	
Weston–Elgin Highway No. 330	41.71	67.13	OR 11 near Weston	I-82 in Elgin	OR 204	1931	current	
Umatilla Mission Highway No. 331	4.84	7.79	I-84 / US 30 at Mission	OR 11 near Mission	OR 331	1957	current	
Bingham Springs Highway No. 331	25.30	40.72	US 30 at Pendleton	Bingham Springs	—	1931	1939	
Sunnyside–Umapine Highway No. 332	7.93	12.76	Oregon–Washington state line near Umapine	OR 11 near Milton-Freewater	OR 332	1931	current	
Hermiston Highway No. 333	18.12	29.16	OR 207 near Echo	US 730 near Cold Springs	OR 207	1932	current	
Athena–Holdman Highway No. 334	16.99	27.34	OR 37 near Pendleton	OR 11 near Athena	OR 334	1936	current	formerly known as the Athena-Cold Springs Hwy. from 1936-1938
Havana–Helix Highway No. 335	9.73	15.66	OR 11 near Mission	Helix	OR 335	1936	current	
Pendleton Airport Highway No. 336	1.18	1.90	US 30 at Pendleton	Eastern Oregon Regional Airport	—	1936	1950	
Stanfield–Pendleton Highway No. 337	24.5	39.4	US 30 near Stanfield	US 30 at Pendleton	—	1938	1957	
Ordnance Depot Highway No. 338	0.41	0.66	I-84 / US 30 near Hermiston	Umatilla Army Depot	—	1942	1972	
Freewater Highway No. 339	3.43	5.52	Milton-Freewater city limits	Oregon–Washington state line near Milton-Freewater	OR 339	1946	current	
Medical Springs Highway No. 340	38.65	62.20	I-84 near Baker City	OR 237 in Union	OR 203	1931	current	
Ukiah–Hilgard Highway No. 341	47.22	75.99	US 395 near Ukiah	I-84 / US 30 at Hilgard	OR 244	1931	current	formerly known as the Starkey Hwy. from 1931-1954.
Cove Highway No. 342	22.07	35.52	OR 82 in Island City	OR 203 in Union	OR 237	1931	current	
La Grande–North Powder Highway No. 343	26.81	43.15	US 30 at North Powder	I-84 / US 30 near La Grande	—	1950	1973	
Little Sheep Creek Highway No. 350	29.36	47.25	OR 82 / OR 351 in Joseph	Imnaha	OR 350	1931	current	
Joseph–Wallowa Lake Highway No. 351	6.67	10.73	Wallowa Lake State Park	OR 82 / OR 350 in Joseph	OR 351	1937	current	
Madras–Prineville Highway No. 360	26.19	42.15	OR 126 in Prineville	US 97 near Madras	US 26	1931	current	formerly known as the warm springs Hwy. from 1931-1942.
Culver Highway No. 361	11.62	18.70	US 97 near Culver	US 26 / US 97 in Madras	OR 361	1947	current	
O'Neil Highway No. 370	17.67	28.44	US 97 near Redmond	OR 126 in Prineville	OR 370	1931	current	
Powell Butte Highway No. 371	7.57	12.18	Deschutes–Crook county line near Powell Butte	OR 126 near Powell Butte	—	1931	2005	
Century Drive Highway No. 372	17.35	27.92	Mount Bachelor ski area	Bend city limits	—	1931	current	
Cline Falls Highway No. 373	10.46	16.83	US 20 in Tumalo	OR 126 at Cline Falls	—	1933	1978	
Tumalo–Deschutes Highway No. 374	3.87	6.23	US 20 in Tumalo	US 97 in Deschutes	—	1933	1978	
Redmond–Bend Highway No. 375	13.26	21.34	US 20 near Tumalo	US 97 at Redmond	—	1937	1978	
Paulina Highway No. 380	55.49	89.30	US 26 in Prineville	Paulina	OR 380	1931	current	Formerly known as the Crooked River Hwy. from 1931-1936, and as the Crooked River-Paulina Hwy. From 1936-1944
Service Creek–Mitchell Highway No. 390	23.79	38.29	US 26 in Mitchell	OR 19 at Service Creek	OR 207	1931	current	
Canyon City–Burns Highway No. 400	67.33	108.36	US 20 near Burns	US 26 in John Day	US 395	1931	1933	
Beech Creek Highway No. 401	5.35	8.61	US 26 in Mount Vernon	US 395 near Mount Vernon	US 395	1931	1966	
Kimberly–Long Creek Highway No. 402	34.88	56.13	OR 19 at Kimberly	US 395 in Long Creek	OR 402	1933	current	Formerly known as the Monument Hwy. from 1933-1939.
Sumpter Highway No. 410	3.71	5.97	OR 7 near Sumpter	Sumpter	OR 410	1931	current	formerly known as the Sumpter Valley Hwy. from 1931-1980.
Haines–Anthony Highway No. 411	15.32	24.66	Wallowa–Whitman National Forest	US 30 in Haines	—	1931	1980	
Robinette–Homestead Highway No. 412	26.0	41.8	OR 86 near Robinette	OR 86 near Homestead	—	1936	1941	
Halfway–Cornucopia Highway No. 413	11.28	18.15	OR 86S / OR 414 in Halfway	Cornucopia	OR 413	1941	current	
Pine Creek Highway No. 414	0.91	1.46	OR 86S / OR 413 in Halfway	OR 86 near Halfway	OR 414	1941	current	
Dooley Mountain Highway No. 415	36.62	58.93	US 26 near Unity	OR 7 near Salisbury	OR 245	1980	current	
Midland Highway No. 420	4.30	6.92	US 97 near Klamath Falls	Washburn Way in Klamath Falls	—	1931	current	
Klamath Lake Highway No. 421	23.37	37.61	OR 236 near Rocky Point	OR 62 at Fort Klamath	—	1931	1958	
Chiloquin Highway No. 422	5.19	8.35	US 97 at Chiloquin	Modoc Point Road near Klamath Agency	OR 422	1931	current	
Lower Klamath Highway No. 423	7.02	11.30	US 97 at Midland	OR 39 near Henley	—	1937	1987	
South Klamath Falls Highway No. 424	5.91	9.51	US 97 / OR 66 near Klamath Falls	OR 39 near Altamont	OR 140	1987	current	
Sand Creek Highway No. 424	4.2	6.8	US 97 near Crater Lake	Crater Lake National Park	—	1937	1952	
East Diamond Lake Highway No. 425	14.82	23.85	OR 138 near Crater Lake National Park	US 97 near Crater Lake	OR 138	1937	2003	
Hatfield Highway No. 426	2.42	3.89	SR 139 / SR 161 at Hatfield, California	OR 39 near Merrill	OR 39	1937	current	Formerly known as the Merrill-Hatfield Hwy. in 1937
Modoc Point Highway No. 427	12.89	20.74	US 97 at Modoc Point	OR 62 at Klamath Agency	—	1940	1987	Formerly known as the Klamath Agency-Modoc Point Hwy. from 1940-1944.
Sun Mountain Highway No. 428	26.9	43.3	OR 62 at Fort Klamath	US 97 near Crater Lake	—	1948	1984	
Crescent Lake Highway No. 429	2.39	3.85	Crescent Lake	OR 58 at Crescent Lake Junction	OR 429	1951	current	
Yellowstone Cutoff Highway No. 430	88.85	142.99	OR 31 at Valley Falls	US 20 near Riley	US 395	1931	1933	
Warner Highway No. 431	64.90	104.45	US 395 near Lakeview	SR 140 in Humboldt County, Nevada	OR 140	1931	current	
Frenchglen Highway No. 440	72.95	117.40	Catlow Valley Road near Frenchglen	OR 78 near Burns	OR 205	1931	current	
Diamond Highway No. 441	26.66	42.91	Diamond	OR 78 near Crane	—	1931	1966	Formerly known as the Diamond Valley Hwy. from 1931-1954.
Steens Highway No. 442	91.55	147.34	US 20 / US 395 in Burns	US 95 at Burns Junction	OR 78	1939	current	Formerly known as the Rome-Princeton Hwy from 1939-1954, and the Cranes-Scotts Butte Hwy. from 1954-1965.
Huntington Highway No. 449	11.09	17.85	I-84 near Huntington	I-84 near Lime	US 30	1968	current	
Succor Creek Highway No. 450	20.09	32.33	OR 201 near Adrian	US 20 / US 26 at Nyssa	OR 201	1931	current	Formerly known as the Jordan Valley Hwy. from 1931-1938, and as the Nyssa-Adrian Hwy. from 1938-1971.
Vale–West Highway No. 451	10.36	16.67	US 20 near Vale	US 20 in Vale	OR 451	1931	current	
Adrian–Parma Highway No. 452	2.75	4.43	OR 201 near Adrian	Oregon–Idaho state line near Adrian	OR 452	1931	1971	
Adrian–Arena Valley Highway No. 453	3.19	5.13	OR 454 near Adrian	Oregon–Idaho state line near Adrian	OR 453	1931	current	
Adrian–Caldwell Highway No. 454	5.09	8.19	Oregon–Idaho state line near Wilder	OR 452 near Adrian	OR 454	1931	current	
Olds Ferry–Ontario Highway No. 455	30.31	48.78	US 20 / US 26 at Cairo	I-84 / US 30 near Huntington	US 30 Bus., OR 201	1956	current	
Homedale Spur Highway No. 455	1.95	3.14	OR 201 near Adrian	SH-19 near Homedale	OR 201	1931	1947	
I.O.N. Highway No. 456	121.30	195.21	US 95 at McDermitt, Nevada	US 95 near Jordan Valley	US 95	1931	current	Formerly known as the McDermitt North Hwy. from 1931-1937
Snake River Correctional Institution Highway No. 457	2.09	3.36	Snake River Correctional Institution	I-84 / US 30 near Ontario	—	—	—	
Malloy Ranch–Idaho Line Highway No. 457	2.4	3.9	Malloy's Ranch	Oregon–Idaho state line near Jordan Valley	US 95	1934	1937	
Jordan Valley Highway No. 458	5.2	8.4	US 95 near Jordan Valley	US 95 near Jordan Valley	US 95	1937	1966	
Baker–Copperfield Spur Highway No. 481	1.15	1.85	OR 86 near Halfway	OR 413 / OR 414 in Halfway	OR 86S	2010	current	
Redwood Spur Highway No. 482	2.68	4.31	OR 99 / OR 238 in Grants Pass	I-5 in Grants Pass	US 199	2010	current	
McMinnville Spur Highway No. 483	0.59	0.95	OR 18 near McMinnville	McMinnville	—	2010	current	
Esplanade Spur Highway No. 484	0.13	0.21	Spring Street in Klamath Falls	OR 39 in Klamath Falls	US 97 Bus.	2010	current	
Fort Stevens Spur Highway No. 485	0.95	1.53	OR 104 in Warrenton	US 101 in Warrenton	OR 104S	2010	current	
Gold Hill Spur Highway No. 486	0.96	1.54	OR 234 in Gold Hil	I-5 at Gold Hill	OR 99, OR 234	2010	current	
Celilo–Wasco Spur Highway No. 487	2.82	4.54	OR 206 near Celilo Village	US 97 at Biggs Junction	—	2010	current	
Chiloquin Spur Highway No. 488	0.19	0.31	Chocktoot Street in Chiloquin	OR 422 at Chiloquin	OR 422S	2010	current	
Parma Spur Highway No. 489	2.75	4.43	OR 201 near Adrian	Oregon–Idaho state line near Adrian	OR 452	2010	current	
Homedale Spur Highway No. 490	2.13	3.43	OR 201 near Adrian	SH-19 near Homedale	OR 201	2010	current	
Weiser Spur Highway No. 491	2.01	3.23	OR 201 near Annex	Weiser Bridge at the Oregon–Idaho state line	US 95 Spur	2011	current	
Payette Spur Highway No. 492	0.07	0.11	SH-52 at Payette, Idaho	OR 52 near Payette, Idaho	OR 52	2011	current	
Ontario Spur Highway No. 493	1.02	1.64	E. Fourth Street in Ontario	US 30 at Ontario	US 30, US 30 Bus.	2011	current	
Former

== Former named state highways ==
This list contains former names used by the Oregon Department of Transportation and predecessors for state highways. It includes former names for current state highways and roads that are no longer state highways.

- Adrian-Parma Highway
- Albany-Sisters Highway
- Alsea River Forest Road
- Ashland-Klamath Falls Highway
- Athena-Cold Springs Highway
- Baker-Cornucopia Highway
- Baker-Homestead Highway
- Baker-Unity Highway
- Banfield Expressway
- Beaverton-Aurora Highway
- Beech Creek Highway
- Bend-Sisters Highway
- Bertha-Beaverton Highway
- Boardman-Stanfield Highway
- Burns-Crane Highway
- Butteville Road-Hubbard Highway
- Canyon City-Burns Highway
- Canyon Road
- Cascade Highway (Oregon)
- Cascade Locks Highway
- Coast Highway (Oregon)
- Columbia River Highway West
- Corvallis-East Side Highway
- Crane-Scotts Butte Highway
- Crooked River-Paulina Highway
- Crown Point Highway
- Dallas-Coast Highway
- Dallas-Dolph Corner Highway
- Dallas-Kings Valley Highway
- Dillard Highway
- Drain-Yoncalla Highway
- East Diamond Lake Highway
- East Portland-Oregon City Highway
- Enterprise-Flora Highway
- Eugene-Florence Highway
- Eugene-Swisshome Highway
- Forest Grove-McMinnville Highway
- Fulton Canyon-Wasco Highway
- Grants Pass-Crescent City Highway
- Halfway Highway
- Hillsboro-Woodburn Highway
- Homedale Spur Highway
- Jordan Valley Highway
- Klamath Falls-Weed Highway
- Klamath-Crater Lake Highway
- La Grande-Enterprise Highway
- La Grande-Joseph Highway
- La Grande-North Powder Highway
- La Grande-Wallowa Lake Highway
- La Pine-Lakeview Highway
- Little Butte Highway
- Mapleton-Eugene Highway
- McDermitt-North Highway
- McKenzie River Highway
- McMinnville-Tillamook Highway
- Medford-Crater Lake Highway
- Medford-Provolt Highway
- Monument Highway
- Mount Hood Loop Highway
- Mount Hood-Clear Lake Highway
- Myrtle Creek Highway
- Nyssa-Adrian Highway
- Oakland-Shady Highway
- Old Columbia River Drive Highway
- Otter Rock Highway
- Portland-Salem Expressway
- Prineville-Bear Creek Highway
- Prineville-Lakeview Highway
- Richardson-Eugene Highway
- Rim Drive
- Robinette-Homestead Highway
- Rome-Princeton Highway
- Roosevelt Coast Highway
- Salem Freeway
- Salem-Dallas Highway
- Salem-Independence Highway
- Sandy Boulevard Highway
- Siuslaw Highway
- Springfield-Cottage Grove Highway
- Starkey Highway
- Sullivan Gulch Highway
- Sumpter Valley Highway
- Three Mile Lane Highway
- Tiller-Summit Forest Road
- Tiller-Trail Highway
- Umatilla Cutoff Highway
- West Portland-Hubbard Highway
- West Side Pacific Highway
- Willamette Valley-Florence Highway
- Williams Highway
- Wolf Creek Highway
- Woodburn-Mount Hood Loop Highway
- Woodburn-Sandy Highway
- Yamhill-Nestucca Highway
- Yellowstone Cut-off Highway

== See also ==
- List of former named state highways in Oregon
