= Oregon Route 380 =

State highway in Crook County, Oregon, US

Oregon Route 380
- Route 380 highlighted in red

Route information
- Maintained by ODOT
- Length: 55.49 mi (89.30 km)
- Existed: 2002–present

Major junctions
- West end: US 26 in Prineville
- East end: Beaver Creek Bridge in Paulina

Location
- Country: United States
- State: Oregon
- County: Crook

Highway system
- Oregon Highways; Interstate; US; State; Named; Scenic
← OR 370	→ US 395

Oregon Route 380 (OR 380) is an Oregon state highway running from Prineville to Paulina. OR 380 is known as the Paulina Highway No. 380 (see Oregon highways and routes). It is 55.49 miles (89.30 km) long and runs east–west, entirely within Crook County. OR 380 was assigned to the Paulina Highway in 2002.

== Route description ==
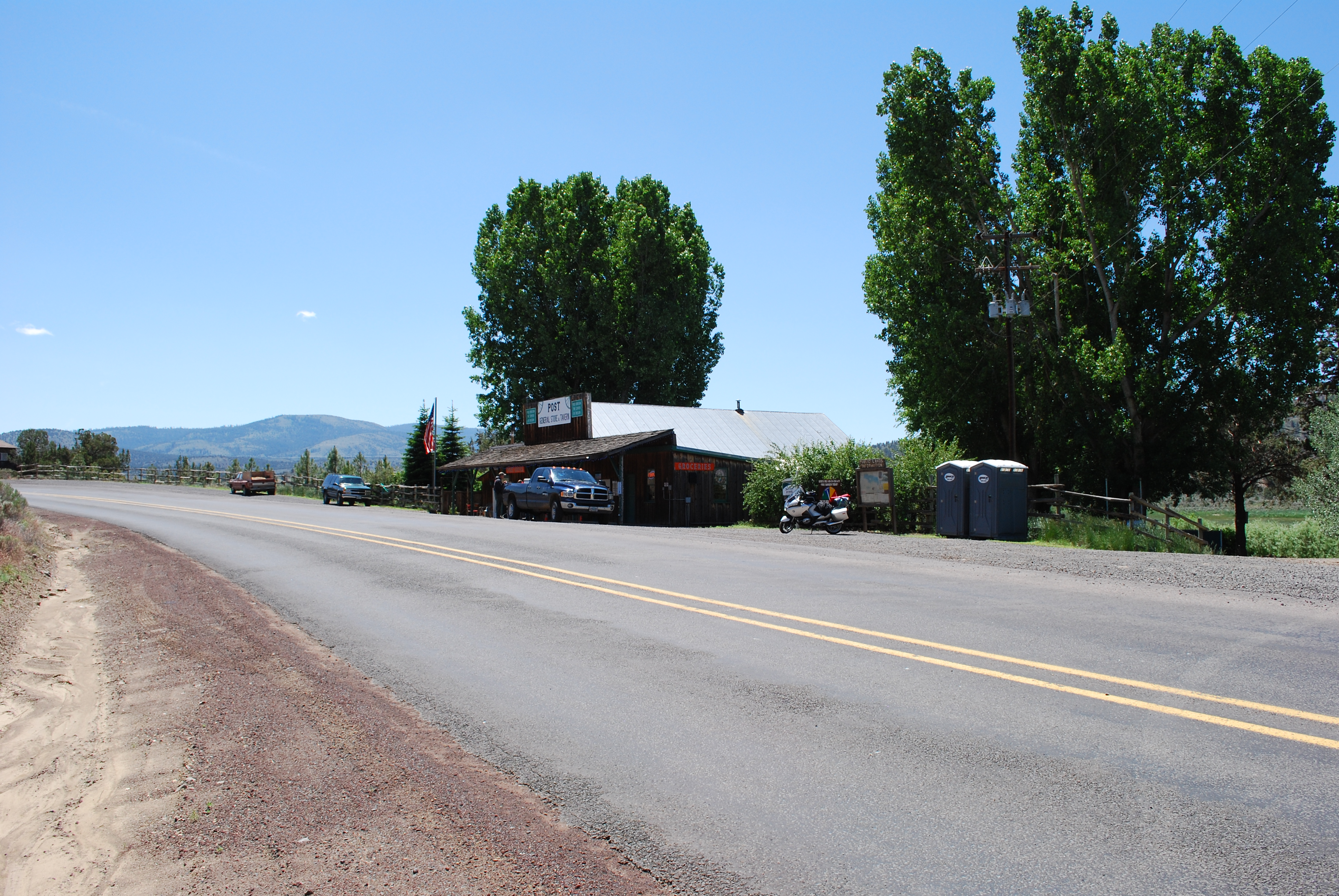
OR 380 in Post, OR

OR 380 begins at an intersection with U.S. Route 26 (US 26) at Prineville and heads east through Post to Paulina, where it ends at the Beaver Creek Bridge.

== History ==
OR 380 was established in 2002 as part of Oregon's project to assign route numbers to highways that previously were not assigned.

== Major intersections ==
The entire route is in Crook County.

Location	mi	km	Destinations	Notes
Prineville	0.00	0.00	US 26 – Prineville, Redmond, Mitchell, John Day	Western terminus
Paulina	55.49	89.30	Paulina Suplee Highway	Continuation beyond eastern terminus at Beaver Creek Bridge
1.000 mi = 1.609 km; 1.000 km = 0.621 mi
