= Oregon Route 53 =

State highway in northwestern Oregon, US

Oregon Route 53
- Route 53 highlighted in red

Route information
- Maintained by ODOT
- Length: 18.91 mi (30.43 km)
- Existed: 1939–present
- Component highways: Necanicum Highway No. 46

Major junctions
- South end: US 101 near Nehalem
- North end: US 26 at Necanicum Junction

Location
- Country: United States
- State: Oregon

Highway system
- Oregon Highways; Interstate; US; State; Named; Scenic
← OR 52	→ OR 58

Oregon Route 53 is an Oregon state highway that runs through a pair of river valleys in the Oregon Coast range; those of the Necanicum River and the Nehalem River. OR 53 traverses the Necanicum Highway No. 46 of the Oregon state highway system.

== Route description ==
Oregon Route 53 begins (at its southern terminus) at a junction with U.S. Route 101 in the city of Nehalem. Soon after leaving the city, the highway begins to follow the North Fork of the Nehalem River (and several minor tributaries). Eventually, the highway and the river diverge; and the highway crosses through a pass to enter the basin of the Necanicum River. It follows this river for a distance, until the highway ends at an intersection with U.S. Route 26 at Necanicum Junction.

OR 53 is a narrow, winding roadway for most of its length, and primarily serves local and recreational traffic. Occasionally, however, closures of US 101 to the west (in particular, in or around the Arch Cape Tunnel, an area very prone to mudslides) will result in heavy commercial use of this roadway, as OR 53 and US 101 are the only viable routes between the Nehalem/Manzanita area and the Cannon Beach/Seaside area.

This route and highway are the former alignment of the Oregon Coast Highway, US 101. Service to Cannon Beach, Arch Cape, and Manzanita were previously by discontinuous local roads.

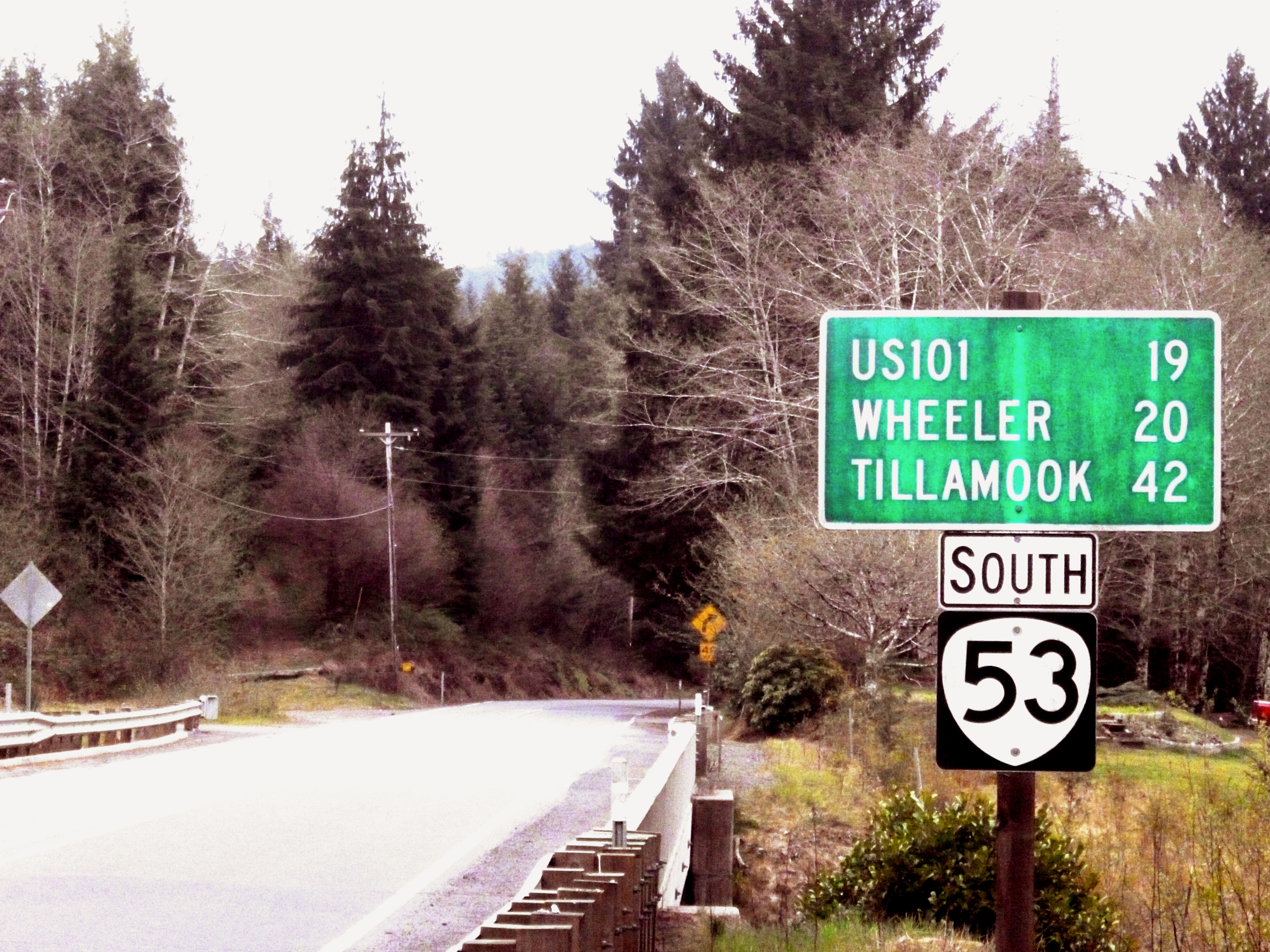
North End of Oregon 53

== Major intersections ==
Milepoints are as reported by ODOT and do not necessarily reflect current mileage. Z indicates overlapping mileage due to construction longer than established route, and – indicates negative mileage behind established beginning point. Segments that are locally maintained may be omitted. For routes traversing multiple named state highways, each milepoint is preceded by the corresponding state highway number.

County	Location	Milepoint	Destinations	Notes
Tillamook	Nehalem Junction	46 19.03	US 101 – Wheeler, Tillamook, Nehalem, Astoria	
Clatsop		46 2.98	Summit, elevation 784 feet (239 m)	
Clatsop	Necanicum Junction	46 0.04	US 26 – Portland, Seaside	
1.000 mi = 1.609 km; 1.000 km = 0.621 mi
