= Oregon Route 501 =

State highway in Benton County, Oregon, US

Oregon Route 501
- Route 501 highlighted in red

Route information
- Maintained by ODOT
- Length: 9.49 mi (15.27 km)
- Existed: 1931–present

Major junctions
- South end: Lobster Valley Road and Hazel Glen Road near Alsea
- North end: OR 34 in Alsea

Location
- Country: United States
- State: Oregon
- County: Benton

Highway system
- Oregon Highways; Interstate; US; State; Named; Scenic
← OR 454	→ OR 528

Oregon Route 501 (OR 501) is an Oregon state highway running from the town of Alsea south 9.49 miles where it ends and turns into Lobster Valley Road at the intersection of Hazel Glen Road near the Benton-Lane County line. OR 501 is known as the Alsea-Deadwood Highway No. 201 (see Oregon highways and routes). It is 9.49 miles (15.27 km) long and runs north–south, entirely within Benton County.

OR 501 was established in 2002 as part of Oregon's project to assign route numbers to highways that previously were not assigned. In 2009, ODOT posted route shield signs at both termini and another intersection.

== Route description ==
OR 501 begins at the intersection of OR 34 in the small rural town of Alsea, from there, it heads south through mostly forested, rural land, following the route of the original logging roads making it extremely curvy at its southern end where it ends and turns into county maintained Lobster Valley Road.

== History ==
OR 501 (The Alsea-Deadwood Highway) was originally planned to start in the small logging town of Alsea, travel south through Lobster Valley, continuing to the small logging community of Paris and south to end at OR 36 in Deadwood. The Highway was never completed south to Paris from Lobster Valley and it was later decided by the Oregon Highway Commission to abandoned any future plans to complete the Highway as originally planned.

The original route of OR 501 was to connect OR 34 in Alsea to OR 36 in Deadwood, hence the name "Alsea-Deadwood Highway". However, only 16 miles were ever completed on the north end from OR 34 to Preacher Creek Road with approximately 13 miles on the south end from OR 36 leaving an area in the middle unfinished. (Approximately 6 of the original 16 miles of the north side were turned over to Benton County, while the approximate 13 mile section running North from OR 36 was turned over to Lane County. Thus, leaving the current 9.49 miles from the small community of Alsea going south as the only section still part of the Oregon state highway system, still maintained by ODOT currentley.

There was a covered bridge built on the Lane County section of the Highway, which was bypassed when it was straightened and turned over to Lane County in the 1960s. This covered bridge is on the list of historic covered bridges within the state.

ODOT has attempted to turn the Highway over to Benton County for several years, however the Highway is in such poor condition with several locations on active slide areas, Benton County has not been interested in taking over control of the Highway without ODOT bringing it up to meet current Highway standards which would cost several millions of dollars. The potential of having a major slide on the Highway is high due to the fact almost half of the Highway is built on steep unstable ground. The Highway is also located in the coast range and receives a very high amount of rain.

Because of the low traffic volume on the Highway, ODOT has never attempted to straighten, widen or upgrade it, they have also never completely resurfaced it causing it to fall somewhat in disrepair over the years.

According to ODOT statistics and sources, OR 501 is in the poorest condition of any state highway in the state.

In 2019, ODOT designated a one-mile section of OR 501 traveling from the town of Alsea south one mile as part of the "Marys Peak to Pacific" Scenic Byway to Alsea Falls..

== Major intersections ==
The entire route is in Benton County.

Location	mi	km	Destinations	Notes
	9.49	15.27	Lobster Valley Road	Southern terminus; road continues as Lobster Valley Road
Alsea	0.00	0.00	OR 34 – Waldport, Corvallis	Northern terminus
1.000 mi = 1.609 km; 1.000 km = 0.621 mi
