= Oregon Route 201 =

North-south state highway in Oregon, US

Oregon Route 201
- Route 201 highlighted in red

Route information
- Maintained by ODOT
- Length: 60.21 mi (96.90 km)

Major junctions
- South end: SH-19 near Adrian
- OR 452 in Adrian; I-84 / US 30 in Ontario; OR 52 in Payette Junction US 95 Spur in Weiser Junction
- North end: I-84 / US 30 in Olds Ferry

Location
- Country: United States
- State: Oregon

Highway system
- Oregon Highways; Interstate; US; State; Named; Scenic
← OR 200	→ OR 202

Oregon Route 201 is a north–south state highway in eastern Oregon. It currently runs from the Idaho state line just south of Adrian to Interstate 84 south of Huntington. Between the state line and Succor Creek Road, it is known the Homedale Spur No. 490. Between Succor Creek Road and Nyssa, it is known as the Succor Creek Highway No. 450 (see Oregon highways and routes), including the Homedale Spur of the same highway. Between Nyssa and Cairo Junction, it is part of the Central Oregon Highway No. 7 as a concurrency with U.S. Route 20 and U.S. Route 26, and north of Cairo Junction, it is the Olds Ferry-Ontario Highway No. 455. At the Idaho state line, Oregon Route 201 becomes State Highway 19.

An unbuilt extension of the Succor Creek Highway is designated southward from the start of the Homedale Spur to US 95.

== History ==
Oregon Route 201 originally existed only as the Succor Creek Highway. It continued south of Adrian via Jordan Valley to McDermitt, where it continued as Nevada State Route 8. The route was completely decommissioned in 1940 with the extension of U.S. Route 95 through Oregon. It would not see new life until U.S. Route 30 was rerouted around Farewell Bend on roughly its current route.

Nearly all of the route north of Nyssa was once part of the historical route of U.S. Route 30 or an associated route. In fact, until 1980, Oregon Route 201's north terminus was at its current junction with U.S. Route 95 Spur, which was at the time U.S. Route 30N.

A bypass of Ontario, the Yturri Beltine, was completed in 2003.

== Major intersections ==
Note: mileposts do not reflect actual mileage due to realignments.

The entire route is in Malheur County.

Location	mi	km	Destinations	Notes
	22.24	35.79	SH-19	Idaho state line
	20.11	32.36	Succor Creek Road – Succor Creek State Park	Proposed Succor Creek Highway
	12.51	20.13	Parma, Caldwell (OR 452)	
Nyssa	0.02 265.97	0.032 428.04	US 20 east / US 26 east – Parma, Nampa, Boise	Southern end of US 20/US 26 overlap
Cairo Junction	258.20 31.81	415.53 51.19	US 20 west / US 26 west – Bend, Burns	Northern end of US 20/US 26 overlap
Ontario	27.77	44.69	Southwest 4th Avenue – Ontario Municipal Airport, Ontario City Center	Former OR 201 north
Ontario	25.44	40.94	US 30 Bus. east – Ontario City Center	Southern end of US 30 Bus. overlap; former OR 201 south
Ontario	25.20	40.56	I-84 / US 30 – Baker, Portland, Boise	Interchange; northern end of US 30 Bus. overlap
	19.65	31.62	OR 52 – Payette	
	11.65	18.75	US 95 Spur – Weiser, Lewiston	
	0.00	0.00	I-84 / US 30 – Baker, Ontario	Interchange
1.000 mi = 1.609 km; 1.000 km = 0.621 mi: Concurrency terminus
