= Roba Ranch =

- U.S. National Register of Historic Places
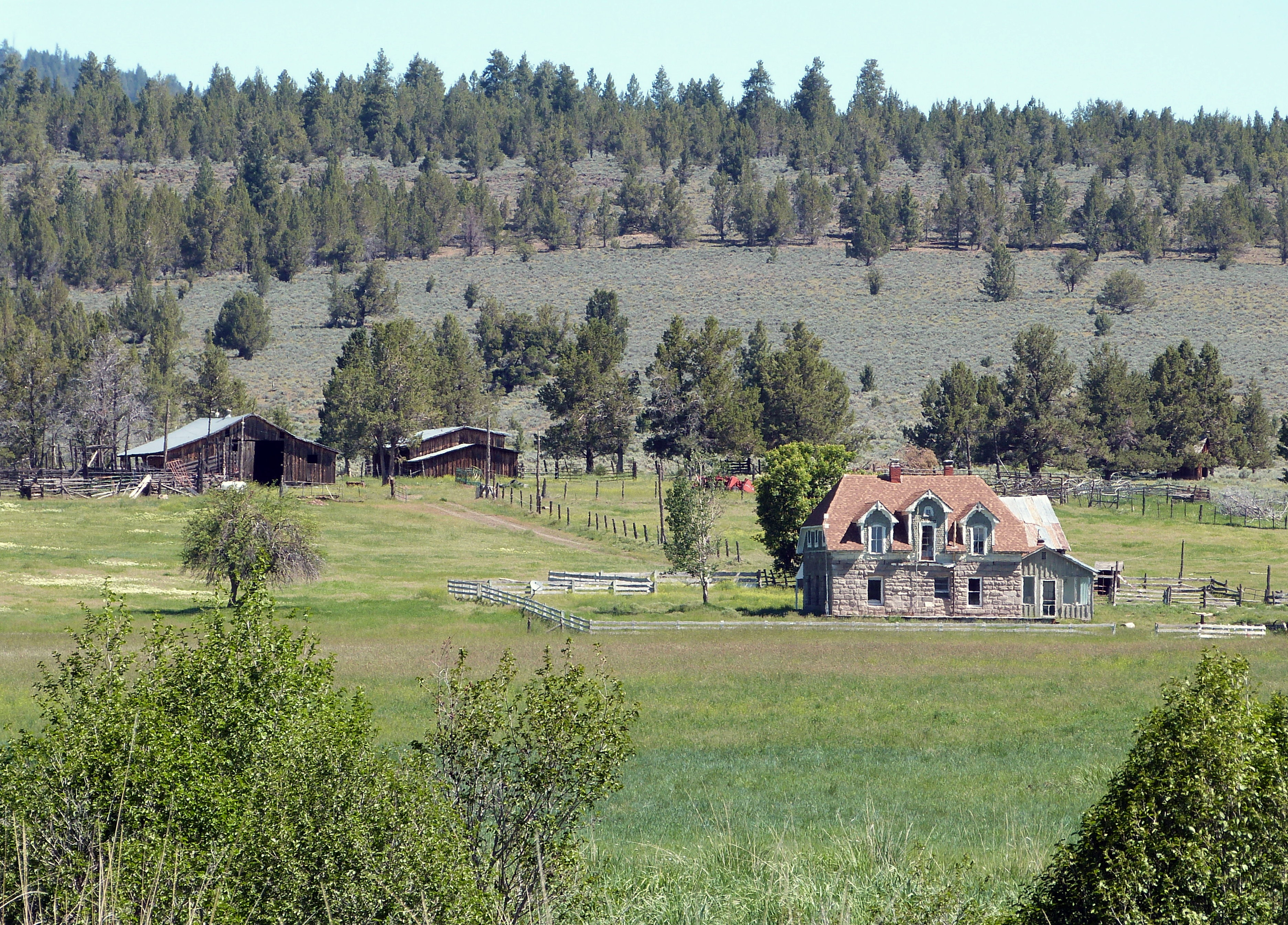
- Historic buildings on Roba Ranch, 2013

- Location within Oregon Location within the United States
- Location: Crook County, Oregon
- Nearest city: Paulina, Oregon
- Coordinates: 44°13′37″N 120°0′6″W
- Built: ca. 1888 to 1910
- Architect: George Roba Sr. and Joseph Roba
- Architectural style: Rustic Victorian
- NRHP reference No.: 07001159
- Added to NRHP: 2007

The Roba Ranch is a pioneer ranch located near the small unincorporated community of Paulina in Crook County, Oregon. The ranch is named for George and Mary Roba, sheep ranchers who acquired the property in 1892. Most of the important ranch buildings were constructed by the Roba family between about 1892 and 1910. Today, the ranch covers 1,480 acres (6.0 km^{2}) and is privately owned. The ranch was listed on the National Register of Historic Places in 2007.

== Early history ==
Native Americans lived in Central Oregon for thousands of years before the arrival of Euro-American settlers. The high desert animals, birds, and plants provided food for these early inhabitants. While there are no records of the earliest people to inhabit the area, by the time Euro-Americans began to explore Central Oregon in the middle of the 19th century, the Northern Paiutes and various Sahaptin speaking peoples were using the area around what is now the Roba Ranch.

Euro-Americans settlers began arriving in Crook County in the 1860s. The first town in the area was Prineville, Oregon. It was established 1868 as a combined store, saloon, and blacksmith shop. While low annual rainfall limited farming, the area's open grasslands were ideal for grazing cattle and sheep. Cattle were brought into area by the first settlers. Sheep were introduced a short time later. Most ranches in the area were small parcels granted under the 1862 Homestead Act. However, ranchers let their livestock graze freely across unoccupied public lands. Typically, livestock was left on the open range year around. During the spring and summer, cattle and sheep herds used high elevation pastures in the Ochoco and Blue mountains. Then the herds were driven to lower elevations pastures for the winter. By 1890, there were approximately 300,000 sheep and 40,000 cattle grazing on Central Oregon range land.

== Roba family ==
George Roba was born in Jernye, Czechoslovakia in 1862. He immigrated to the United States in 1882. After arriving in the United States, he worked as a miner in Pennsylvania. While mining, Roba met three Czechoslovak brothers who introduced him to their sister. He married Maria (“Mary”) Sojka in 1886. Lured by the opportunity to acquire a Homestead Act land grant, Roba moved to Central Oregon in 1888. His wife and young family remained in Pennsylvania while he looked for work in Oregon. Roba found a job as a sheepherder at a ranch near Paulina, Oregon. He herded sheep through the Paulina Valley and along the north fork of the Crooked River. By 1889, George had accumulated a small herd of sheep and earned enough money to send for his family.

In 1892, Roba found a ranch near Paulina Creek. The owner wanted to move to the Willamette Valley so Roba was able to purchase the property. The original owner had already built a small ranch house and a barn on the property. This allowed Roba to begin sheep ranching as soon as his family moved to the ranch. By 1895, Roba had built a successful ranch operation with 1,400 sheep. He also had a few head of cattle plus some horses and mules.

From 1896 to 1905, there was a range war between cattlemen and sheepherders across much of eastern Oregon. In the Paulina area, the conflict was driven by the Crook County Sheep Shooter Association, a group of cattlemen dedicated to keeping sheep from grazing on public range land. During the worst years of the conflict, as many as 10,000 sheep were slaughtered. The conflict ended in 1906, when the United States Government began issuing grazing permit to control the use of Oregon's public lands.

For the most part, Roba stayed clear of the conflict despite the fact that he had over 2,000 sheep. However, in the fall of 1899 one of his sheep camps was burned. Instead of risking the loss of his sheep to gunmen, Roba began selling his herd. Because livestock prices were high, he made a significant profit which he used to buy a store in Paulina. During this period, he also began to establish a small cattle herd. In 1910, Roba and his sons, Joseph and George Jr. constructed a new ranch house from stone they cut from a quarry on their property. George and Mary lived together on the ranch for another twenty-three years, until Mary died in 1933. When George died in 1939, the Roba's daughter, Ruby Rose, inherited the ranch.

A one-story utility room was added to the northeast corner of the main house in the 1950s. In the 1980s, a new barn, machine shop, and a vehicle and equipment storage building were constructed at the ranch. In 2004, the ranch was sold to Doug and Sue Stocks.

Today, there are four original ranch buildings plus one other historic structure remaining at the site. This makes the Roba Ranch one of the few surviving pioneer-era sheep ranches in Central Oregon. Because the remaining ranch complex is typical of late 19th and early 20th century family-run ranching operations, the Roba Ranch was listed on the National Register of Historic Places on 7 November 2007.

== Ranch environment ==
The Roba Ranch covers 1,480 acres (6.0 km^{2}). It is mostly grasslands surrounded by rim rocks and gently rolling hills covered in Western juniper and Ponderosa pine trees. There are two year-round streams, Paulina Creek and Roba Creek, that flow south through the property into the Paulina Valley. Both streams are shallow and are less than 30 feet (9.1 m) wide at their widest point. The elevation at the historic ranch area is approximately 3,830 feet (1,170 m) above sea level.

The undeveloped parts of the Roba Ranch are dominated by native vegetation, predominately sagebrush and desert grasses. Common shrubs and wild flowers include bitterbrush, bitterroot, larkspur, and Indian Paintbrush. Western juniper and Ponderosa pine are common on upland slopes.

The ranch supports a wide variety of wildlife including mule deer, pronghorn antelope, coyote, American badger, jackrabbits, squirrels, and chipmunks. Bird species native to the area include sage grouse, mountain quail, mountain chickadees, pygmy nuthatch, great horned owls, hawks, and golden eagles.

== Structures ==
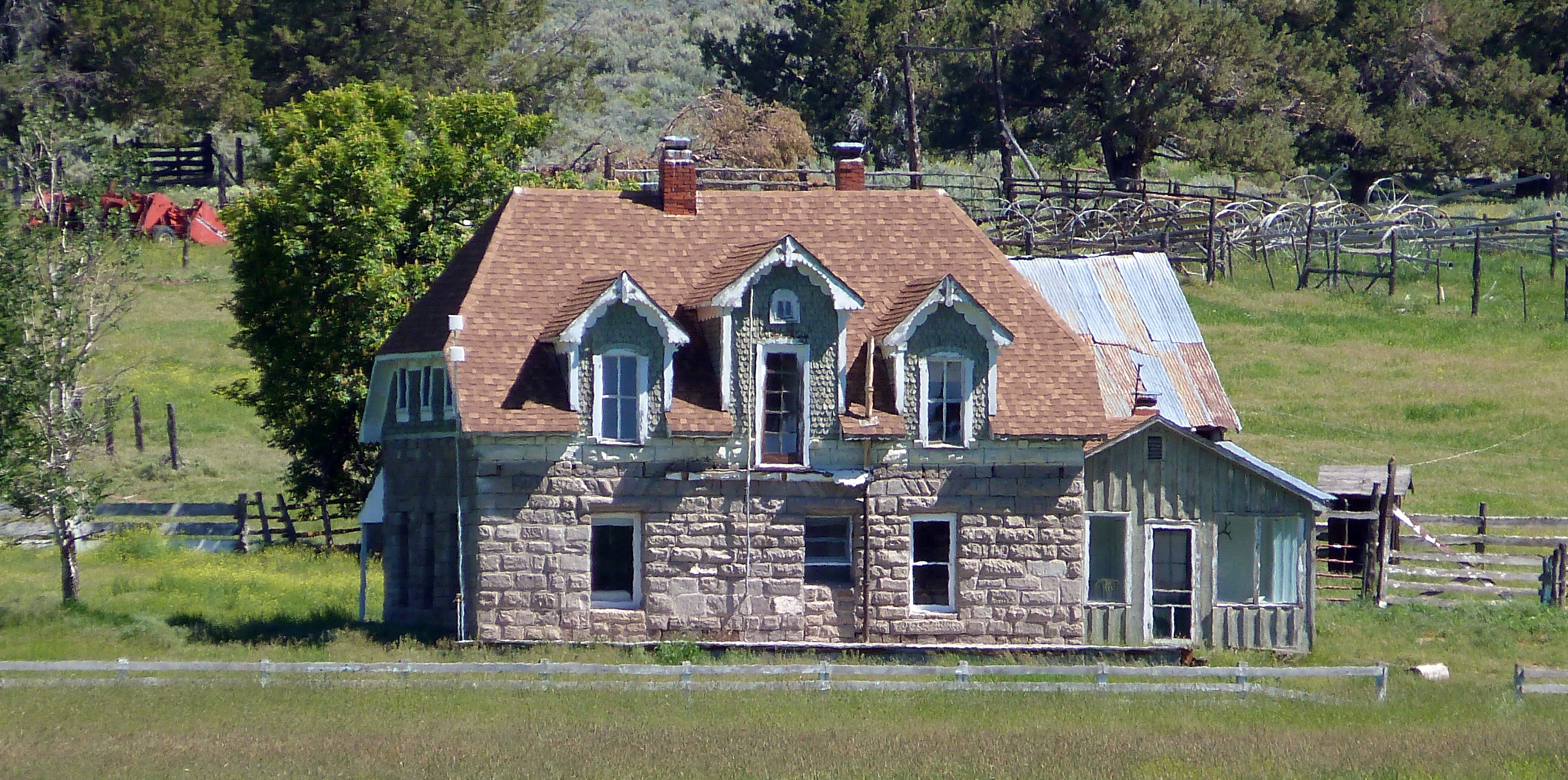
Main house at the Roba Ranch, completed in 1910

There are four historic buildings plus one other historic structure located in the property. The historic buildings are located on a 5.6-acre (0.023 km^{2}) parcel within the larger ranch property. The historic ranch complex includes a house, barn, pump house, privy, and corrals. All of the structures on the ranch except the original barn were built by the Roba family using logs, lumber, hand-cut shingles, bricks, and locally quarried tuff stone.

- The ranch house was built in 1910. It is a 1 1/2-story rustic Victorian style building. The building's foundation is tuff-stone. The same stone was used to construct the first story structure. The upper level and roof are wood framed. The house has a high gabled roof with two brick chimneys and six gable dormers, three on the front and three on the back. The center dormers on the front and back of the house are larger than the outer dormers. The front porch runs the length of the building and is supported by square wooden posts. There is a second-story balcony above the porch. The dormers and the top portions of the main gable ends of the house are finished with fishscale wood shingles. There are Victorian style details on the second-story frieze, fascia boards, and support brackets around the dormers. The windows on the main level of the house are double-hung wood windows. The front dormers have tall, double-hung, two-over-two wood sash windows, while the rear dormers have simple casement windows. In the 1950s, a one-story addition was built onto northeast corner of the house. The addition has a gabled roof with board-and-batten siding. The main entrance to the ranch house is at the north end of the addition. Inside, on the first floor of the original house, there is a large living room, kitchen, dining room, and bathroom. The one-story addition houses a sun porch, walk-in cooler, mud-room, and a small bathroom. Upstairs there are four bedrooms and a bathroom.
- The original barn, built sometime around 1888–1889, is the oldest structure on the ranch. The barn's footprint is 52 feet (16 m) by 26 feet (7.9 m). It has a log-frame with a gable roof. The roof was originally covered with wood shingles, but at some point the shingles were replaced with corrugated metal. The structure has vertical siding made up of random-width boards. The south side of the barn has a lean-to shed attached. The barn interior is open space with a dirt floor. The building is supported by 14 inches (360 mm) by 14 inches (360 mm) timber posts, resting on tuff-stone blocks. There are built-in chicken coops and a storage area at the north end of the barn. The south end has a feed troughs and area for saddles and tack.
- The pump house was built next to Roba Creek about 1900. The footprint of the pump house is 5 feet (1.5 m) by 10 feet (3.0 m). It is a simple wooden structure with wood framing, wood-plank floor, vertical wooden siding, and a gable roof covered with wooden shingles.
- The privy is located in the corral area, near the barn. It was built sometime around 1900. It is a simple 4 feet (1.2 m) by 4 feet (1.2 m) wooden structure with 1 inch (25 mm) by 11 inches (280 mm) rough-sawn vertical siding. It has a gable roof with a south facing door.
- The historic corrals and fences are located at the top of a hill, north of the ranch house and barn. The corral area includes wooden fences and cattle chutes built in the late 1890s. Most fence posts are peeled juniper logs, approximately 8 inches (200 mm) in diameter. The fences have four rough-sawn pine cross-rails, each 8 inches (200 mm) wide. Rock cribs made of rough-cut logs filled with rocks are used to anchor and support fence lines.

The ranch complex also includes three non-historic buildings: a vehicle and equipment storage building, a machine shop, and a new barn. All of these buildings were constructed in the 1980s. The vehicle and equipment storage building has a wood-frame sheathed in board-and-batten siding. It has a shallow gable roof covered wooden shingle. The machine shop is a wood-frame building with corrugated metal walls and sheet metal roof. Half of the front side of the building is open while the other half is enclosed with a roll-up door. The new barn is a long, gable-roof building with a wood-frame, vertical wooden siding, and corrugated metal roof. One of the barn's gable ends has large doors for easy access.

== Location ==
The Roba Ranch is located off Oregon Route 380 in a remote area of Central Oregon in the eastern part of Crook County. The nearest town is the small unincorporated community of Paulina, Oregon, 10 miles (16 km) south of the ranch property. The city of Prineville, the county seat of Crook County, is 64 miles (103 km) west of the ranch via Paulina.
