= Oregon Route 540 =

State highway in Coos County, Oregon, US

Oregon Route 540
- Route 540 highlighted in red

Route information
- Maintained by ODOT
- Length: 14.20 mi (22.85 km)
- Existed: 2003–present

Major junctions
- West end: Cape Arago State Park
- East end: US 101 in North Bend

Location
- Country: United States
- State: Oregon
- County: Coos

Highway system
- Oregon Highways; Interstate; US; State; Named; Scenic
← OR 528	→ OR 542

Oregon Route 540 (OR 540) is an Oregon state highway running from North Bend to Cape Arago State Park. OR 540 is known as the Cape Arago Highway No. 240 (see Oregon highways and routes). It is 14.20 miles (22.85 km) long and runs northeast to southwest, entirely within Coos County.

OR 540 was established in 2003 as part of Oregon's project to assign route numbers to highways that previously were not assigned. It was signed at its intersection with US 101 in 2013.

== Route description ==
Though not a "Highway" in the traditional sense, OR 540 begins at the intersection of Sheridan Avenue and Virginia Avenue in North Bend. Sheridan Avenue carries the northbound traffic of US 101. It travels west along Virginia Avenue, turning south onto Broadway Street, then west again on Newmark Avenue where it enters the city of Coos Bay. At the western edge of Coos Bay, OR 540 turns southwest, traveling through the towns of Barview and Charleston. For its remaining length, the highway skirts the coastline to Cape Arago State Park, where it ends, becoming Cape Arago Road.

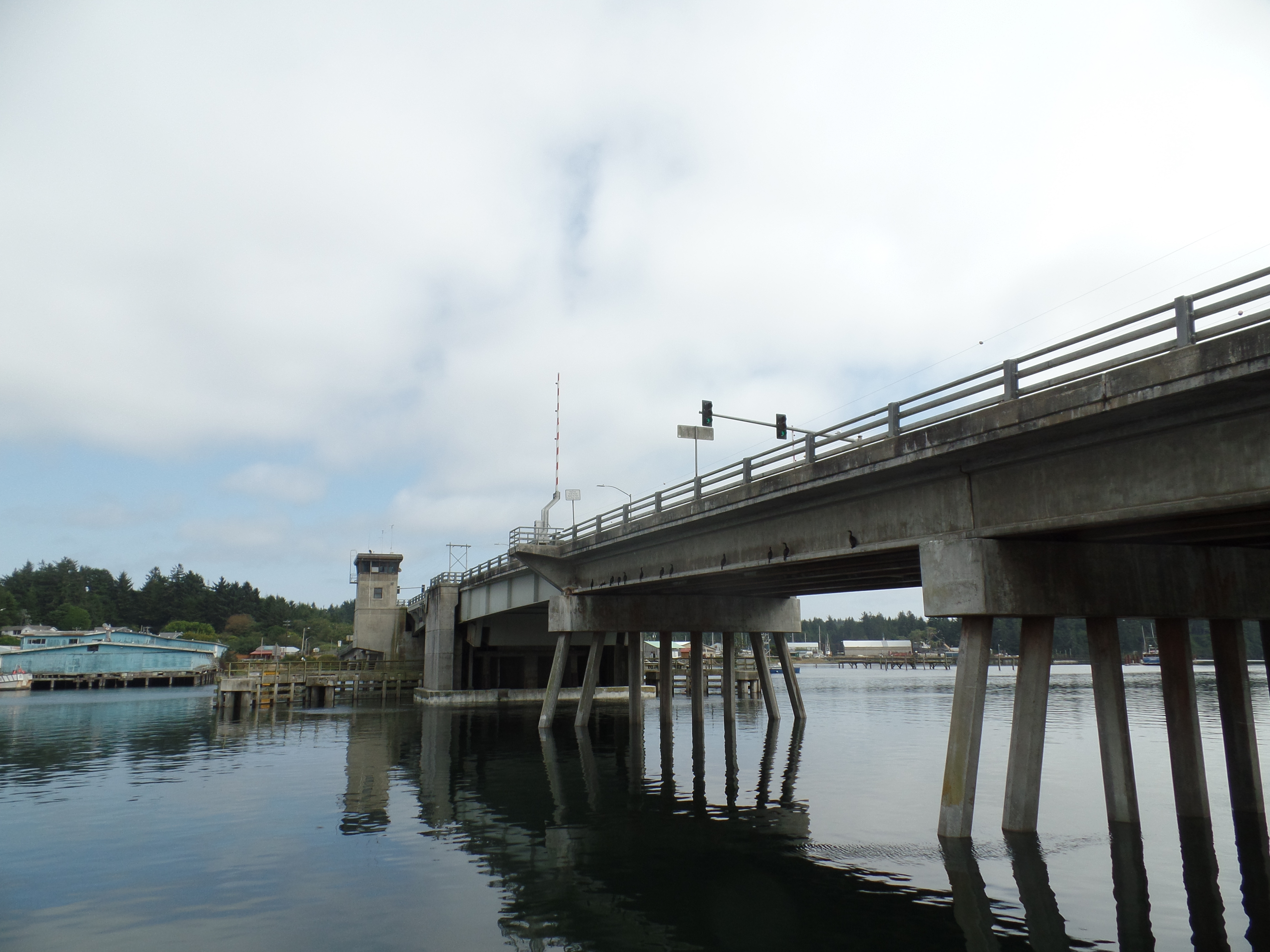
Drawbridge in Charleston

== History ==
OR 540 was assigned to the Cape Arago Highway in 2003.

== Major intersections ==
The entire route is in Coos County.

Location	mi	km	Destinations	Notes
North Bend	0.00	0.00	US 101 – Reedsport, Florence, Coos Bay, Bandon	
Coos Bay	2.74	4.41	City limits (begin city maintenance)	
Coos Bay	4.49	7.23	City limits (end city maintenance)	
Cape Arago State Park	14.15	22.77	End state maintenance	
1.000 mi = 1.609 km; 1.000 km = 0.621 mi
