= Roosevelt Freeway =

Roosevelt Freeway may refer to the following roads in the United States:

- FDR Drive in New York City
- Roosevelt Freeway (Oregon), a project in Eugene, Oregon, which was cancelled in 1978
