= Oregon Route 126 =

State highway in Oregon

Oregon Route 126
- OR 126 highlighted in red; business route highlighted in green

Route information
- Maintained by ODOT
- Length: 204.63 mi (329.32 km)
- Existed: 1964–present
- History: Preceded by US 126 (est. 1926)

Major junctions
- West end: US 101 in Florence
- I-5 in Eugene; US 20 in Sisters; US 97 in Redmond
- East end: US 26 in Prineville

Location
- Country: United States
- State: Oregon
- Counties: Lane, Linn, Deschutes, Crook

Highway system
- Oregon Highways; Interstate; US; State; Named; Scenic
← OR 120	→ OR 127
← OR 104	→ OR 120

Oregon OR 126 (OR 126) is a 204.63-mile-long (329.32 km) state highway that connects coastal, western, and central parts of the U.S. state of Oregon. A short freeway section of OR 126 in Eugene and Springfield is concurrent with Interstate 105 (I-105).

== Route description ==
=== Florence to Eugene ===
The western terminus of OR 126 is in Florence at a junction with US 101, the main north–south route along the Oregon Coast. The junction is located north of downtown Florence near the municipal airport and the mouth of the Siuslaw River, which empties into the nearby Pacific Ocean. OR 126 travels east on the Florence-Eugene Highway No. 62 (see Oregon highways and routes), which follows the Siuslaw River and the Coos Bay Rail Line out of Florence and into the Siuslaw National Forest and the foothills of the Coast Range. The highway turns north along a bend in the river to reach Mapleton, where it intersects OR 36 and leaves the river and railroad for Knowles Creek. OR 126 continues east along the creek to the Ralph A. Petersen Tunnel, a 1,450-foot (440 m) long tunnel that opened in 1957.

The Petersen Tunnel, heading east

From the tunnel, the highway descends from the mountains along Turner Creek to briefly rejoin the Siuslaw River and the Coos Bay Rail Line. OR 126 and the railroad split from the river to follow Wildcat Creek northeast to Cougar Pass, which marks the boundary between the Siuslaw and Willamette river basins. The highway descends into the Willamette Valley and passes through the town of Veneta and along the south shore of the Fern Ridge Reservoir. It also joins a section of the Coos Bay Rail Line as it approaches Eugene.

In the western outskirts of Eugene, OR 126 intersects OR 569, which forms a northern bypass of Eugene. The highway follows Amazon Creek on West 11th Avenue towards downtown Eugene, turning north onto Garfield Street for five blocks. It then becomes concurrent with OR 99, which travels through downtown Eugene on a pair of one-way streets: West 7th Avenue for eastbound traffic and West 6th Avenue for westbound traffic. At a junction with Washington and Jefferson streets, OR 126 turns north onto a freeway, which is designated as Interstate 105 (I-105).

In January 2016, the Oregon Legislature passed SB 5, designating OR 126 between Florence and Eugene as "William Tebeau Memorial Highway," named after a pioneering ODOT engineer.

=== Freeway section ===
Interstate 105
- Location: Eugene, Oregon
- Length: 3.49 mi (5.62 km)

At the junction with Washington and Jefferson streets in downtown Eugene lies the western terminus of Eugene-Springfield Highway No. 227, an east-west freeway through the Eugene-Springfield metropolitan area. OR 126 is routed along this freeway for its entire length, and I-105 is routed along the first 3.5 miles (5.6 km) until the interchange with I-5.

The bridge and viaduct carrying the first 1.5 miles (2.4 km) of I-105 are sometimes known as the Washington-Jefferson Street Bridge. After crossing the Willamette River, passing two exits, and entering Springfield, I-105 ends at an interchange with I-5, and OR 126 continues east then turning south, with the freeway terminating at Main Street (OR 126 Business) in the Thurston neighborhood of the city's east end.

In December 2011 the section of highway from the Washington-Jefferson Street Bridge to Springfield was renamed Officer Chris Kilcullen Memorial Highway to commemorate the fallen Eugene Police Department officer who was fatally wounded while conducting a traffic stop on the highway in April 2011.

=== Springfield to Prineville ===
OR 126 continues east as McKenzie Highway No. 15 and the McKenzie River Scenic Byway, flanking the McKenzie River for most of its length from Springfield into the Cascade Range. It turns north at Belknap Springs and follows the Clear Lake–Belknap Springs Highway No. 215, passing the eponymous Clear Lake. The highway merges with US 20 near Crescent Mountain and begins a concurrency that continues through Santiam Junction (the terminus of OR 22) and Sisters as Santiam Highway No. 16. OR 242 is an alternative route between Belknap Springs and Sisters that travels between Mount Washington and the Three Sisters.

East of Sisters, OR 126 splits from US 20 (which turns southeast towards Bend) and continues east onto the Sisters-Redmond Highway and resumes its designation as McKenzie Highway No. 15. The highway crosses Deschutes River and travels through Redmond, where it is briefly concurrent with US 97's bypass of the city. OR 126 travels southeast on Ochoco Highway No. 41 from Redmond, passing its commercial airport, to reach its eastern terminus at U.S. Route 26 (US 26) in Prineville.

== History ==
(1926–February 1, 1952)

(February 1, 1952–1972)

In 1926, the route between Florence and Ontario was designated as US 28. The Junction City-Florence section of the highway ran roughly along what are now OR 36 and OR 126.

In 1937, the same year a new US 99 alignment between Eugene and Junction City opened, US 28 was truncated and its western terminus moved to Glenwood (between Eugene and Springfield).

On February 1, 1952, US 28 was eliminated from the United States Numbered Highway System. The highway was redesignated US 26 between the Oregon-Idaho border and Prineville (and then continuing north and west through Portland to Astoria). The former US 28 section between Prineville and Eugene was then designated U.S. Route 126.

In 1957 the long-awaited direct route between Eugene and the coast, known as "Route F", was completed. It was primarily funded by the Lane County government with assistance from the federal government, with the goal of bypassing the longer Stagecoach Road. It was proposed as early as the 1930s. The Knowles Creek tunnel was opened to traffic on June 4, 1957, and was later renamed for Ralph A. Petersen, a Lane County commissioner who had lobbied for the highway's construction. The state of Oregon formally named the new route the Eugene-Mapleton Highway, but did not assign it a route number until 1964, when it became OR 126. Highway authorities agreed to the duplication as a temporary one, as US 126 would soon disappear under the ongoing elimination of three-digit U.S. Routes lying entirely within one state.

A freeway bypass of OR 126 in Downtown Eugene, named the Q Street Freeway, was planned in the late 1950s and incorporated into the Interstate Highway System as I-105. Initial plans called for its route to follow Q Street from Coburg Road in Eugene (near the Delta Highway) to Mill Street in northern Springfield, with further extensions at both ends. The freeway would reach Downtown Eugene by following the Washington and Jefferson Street Bridge over the Willamette River, which had already been planned by the city government. An eastern extension to Highway 126 near Springfield was also planned by the state government, but Lane County officials requested a longer route to avoid more of Springfield. The completed Eugene section of I-105 was dedicated by Governor Tom McCall on October 25, 1967, along with improvements to US 126 in Springfield.

In 1972, the American Association of State Highway Officials dropped US 126 from its highway system. The state of Oregon promptly redesignated the Prineville-Eugene section of the former U.S. Route, and the Mapleton-Florence section of OR 36, as OR 126.

=== Prior routes ===
The routes of OR 126 and its predecessors have changed numerous times over the years. The original route of US 28 from Florence to Eugene ran through Junction City, and overlapped US 99 (now OR 99) from there south to Eugene. The route between Junction City and Brickerville is now OR 36; the original route of US 28 west of Brickerville is no longer on the state highway system.

In 1972, US 126 was eliminated and OR 126 through the Eugene-Springfield area was routed onto a newly constructed freeway through north and east Springfield, and then the older I-105 at Eugene. The portions of the former US 126 rolling through downtown Springfield and Eugene were designated as the OR 126 business route.

The place where OR 126 and its predecessors cross the Cascades has changed over the years. Originally, the highway was routed over McKenzie Pass, a high mountainous route that frequently was closed in winter due to poor road conditions. In 1962, the Clear Lake Cutoff was constructed between Clear Lake and Belknap Springs, connecting the McKenzie Highway to the Santiam Highway (US 20) to the north. US 126 was re-routed over the cutoff and ran concurrently with US 20 east over the Cascades to Sisters, where it resumes its original course. The stretch of the McKenzie Highway between Belknap Springs and Sisters is now designated as OR 242. OR 242 is primarily a scenic route and is not plowed in wintertime.

=== Proposed expansions ===
Currently, the route of Oregon OR 126 through western Eugene runs along several surface streets, most notably including West 11th Avenue. This route is well known in the Eugene area for traffic problems. Several projects have been proposed to deal with this; however, none has met with community approval.

A new proposed alignment of OR 126, the West Eugene Parkway is being planned by transportation authorities (but is facing fierce opposition from activists opposed to the parkway). The proposed parkway, a limited-access expressway with some at-grade intersections and some interchanges, would run north of the current West 11th alignment. Transportation planners have argued that the new route is necessary to fight congestion in Eugene and its western suburbs and that the highway would facilitate traffic and growth in the year 2025. Highway opponents note that world petroleum supplies will likely be in decline long before the road would be completed, and therefore modest fixes to existing roads would be sufficient.

The Roosevelt Freeway was a freeway proposed in the 1960s and planned in the 1970s, which would serve as a new alignment of OR 126 through west Eugene. It was cancelled in 1978 due to community opposition.

Construction on the parkway was set to begin in 2006 though land-use appeals and lack of funding delayed and ultimately prevented groundbreaking on the project.

==== Roosevelt Freeway ====
The Roosevelt Freeway was a proposed freeway alignment of OR 126 through Eugene, Oregon and its western suburbs. The project was canceled in 1972, largely due to the Oregon freeway revolts.

The freeway was proposed to go north of the current OR 126 alignment along West 11th Avenue, Roosevelt Boulevard and the Willamette River near the Whitaker neighborhood, and connect to the current I-105 just south of the Washington-Jefferson Street Bridge. (A proposed eastward extension of the project, the Skinner Butte Freeway, never made it off the drawing board).

The freeway was designed to solve a longstanding traffic issue in Eugene, the inadequacy of West 11th Avenue (a neighborhood arterial) to handle long-haul and commuter traffic. Many commuters, as well as state transportation officials, strongly desired to build the freeway. Plans for the freeway were completed in the mid-1970s, and the state of Oregon had begun buying up property for the right-of-way. A ramp stub currently exists on I-105, where the interchange with the Roosevelt Freeway would have been.

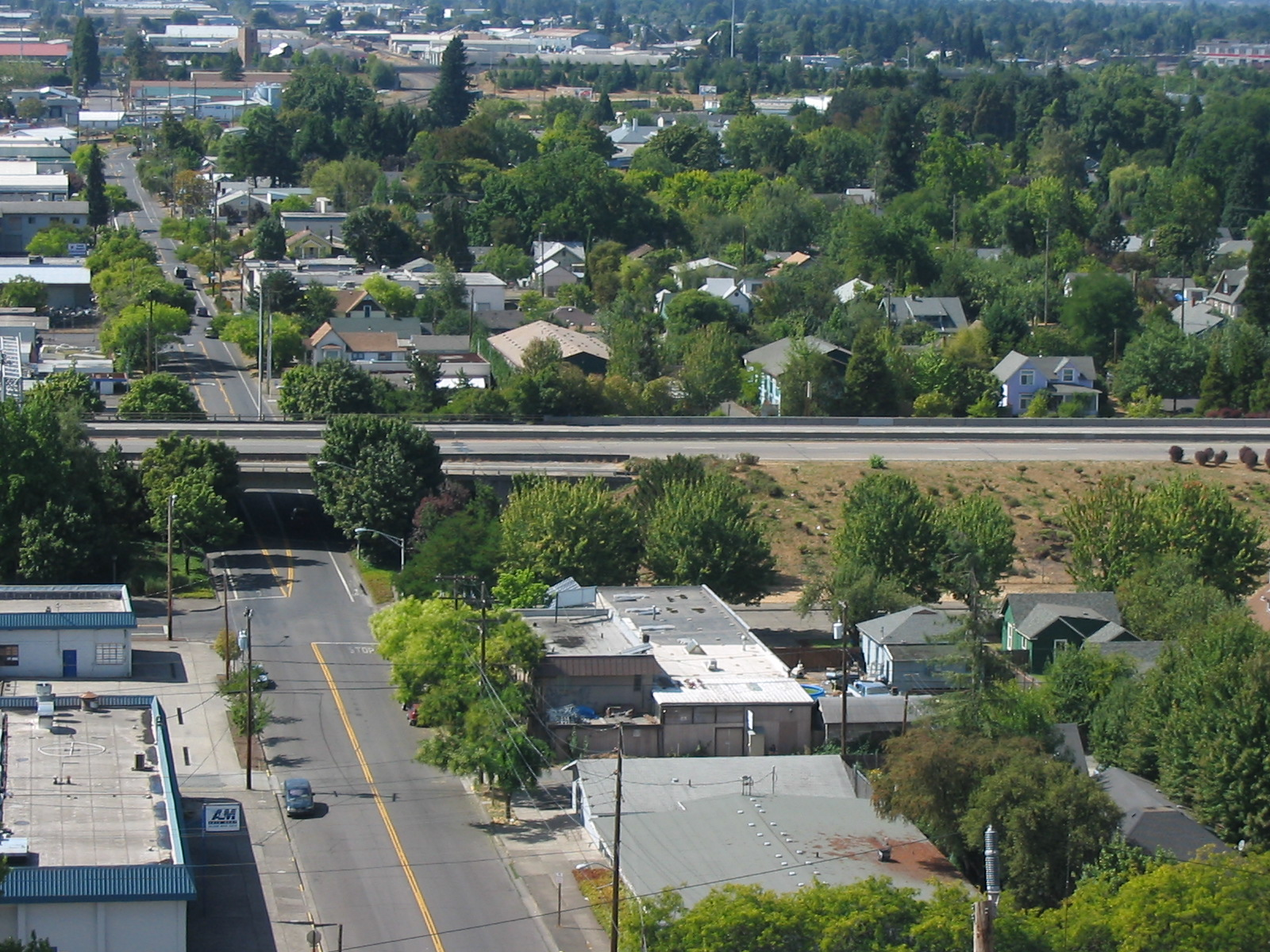
This ramp stub, as seen from the west side of Skinner Butte, was supposed to provide access to the canceled Roosevelt Freeway from Interstate 105.

However, the freeway proved to be unpopular with Eugene residents, due to its impact on existing neighborhoods and riverfront access. In 1978, the so-called "T-2000" transportation plan was adopted, which effectively killed the Roosevelt Freeway by removing it from the plan's list of transportation projects. The plan did call for an east–west corridor through west Eugene, but for a scaled-down version. The mothballed West Eugene Parkway, a non-freeway route on a similar alignment, was seen by supporters and critics alike as an implementation of these plans.

==== West Eugene Parkway ====
The West Eugene Parkway, or WEP, was a proposed re-alignment of OR 126 through the western parts of Eugene and its suburbs. OR 126 runs through west Eugene along several surface streets, including West 11th Avenue, which is well known for its traffic problems. The proposed route, a limited-access expressway with some at-grade intersections and one interchange, would have run north of the current West 11th alignment, terminating at the western terminus of the Sixth-Seventh Avenue couplet carrying OR 99 through west Eugene. The project proved to be highly controversial. In July 2006, ODOT suspended work on it, and recommended a no-build alternative to the Federal Highway Administration.

Transportation planners argued that the new route is necessary to fight traffic congestion in Eugene and its western suburbs and that the highway would facilitate traffic and growth in the year 2025.

Opponents to the parkway have several reasons for their objection:

- The route is not needed; further road construction is a symptom of urban sprawl and better land use planning is the solution
- The route will encourage further development and urban sprawl in west Eugene
- World petroleum supplies will likely be in decline long before the road would be completed, and therefore modest fixes to existing roads would be sufficient
- The proposed route will disrupt environmentally-sensitive areas, including wetlands near the proposed alignment
- The parkway is just a resurrection of the old Roosevelt Freeway proposal (canceled in 1972), and calling the proposed project a "parkway" is deceptive
- The proposed route will just dump more traffic in Eugene's downtown core. The project fails the federally mandated "independent utility" test, and is thus illegal, because public transportation projects must be self-standing, according to federal law. It is alleged that construction of the parkway will raise traffic on Sixth and Seventh Avenues to unacceptable levels, requiring construction of a new highway through downtown. If such a design element was included in the current plan, such inclusion would likely lead to its cancellation.
- Funds spent on the project (officially $169 million) would be better spent on other improvements to the area transportation network.
- Over the past 20 years Eugene City Planning required businesses build along the West 11th corridor to place their parking lots behind their buildings, resulting in many buildings erected close to the existing street. Construction of the proposed parkway would require widening of the current road, forcing many of these businesses to close or relocate. Consequently, the project was opposed by many business owners along the route.

On June 18 and 19, 2001, the City of Eugene, Lane County, the Oregon Department of Transportation (ODOT), the Federal Highway Administration (FHWA) and the Bureau of Land Management (BLM), among others, held a two-day "West Eugene Charrette" to discuss the future of the project. Most participants were supporters of the highway, but at the end of the conference agreed to select the "no-build" option. This consensus was not implemented, although ODOT and FHWA continued to spend millions, for a time, on the environmental impact statement.

Supporters, and the government agencies involved in the planning of the project, pointed to the fact that the parkway proposal has been approved by city voters in two referendum elections, most recently in 2001. Opponents note that the election was 51 to 49, and that proponents claimed "The Money Is There" when selling the project. The official price tag for the WEP was $88 million in 2001, but a 2004 estimate by local and state governments predicts the cost is really $169 million. Few WEP proponents support tax increases to pay for the highway.

On October 26, 2005, the Eugene City Council voted 5-4 to withdraw the city's support for the project, although the City of Eugene has continued its agreement with ODOT to assume responsibility for maintaining part of the road. The city also owns the property for the parkway that has not yet been transferred to the BLM nature preserve for conservation and restoration.

In July 2006, ODOT withdrew its support of the project, effectively stopping further progress.

== Major intersections ==
Note: mileposts do not reflect actual mileage due to realignments.

County	Location	mi	km	Exit	Destinations	Notes
Lane	Florence	0.02	0.032		US 101 – Yachats, Newport, Reedsport, Coos Bay	
Lane	Mapleton	14.40	23.17		OR 36 east – Swisshome, Junction City	
Lane	Veneta	46.92	75.51		OR 200 (Territorial Highway) – Elmira, Veneta	
Lane		52.69 0.00	84.80 0.00	West end of formerly proposed West Eugene Parkway		
Lane	Eugene	3.10	4.99		OR 569 north (Beltline Highway) to I-5 / OR 99 – Santa Clara, Springfield	
Lane	Eugene	122.26	196.76		OR 99 north – Eugene Airport, Junction City	West end of OR 99 overlap
Lane	Eugene	123.10	198.11		Blair Boulevard	Former Junction City-Eugene Highway
Lane	Eugene	123.30	198.43		Jefferson Street – Lane County Fairgrounds	
Lane	Eugene	123.37 0.00	198.54 0.00		OR 99 south / OR 126 Bus. east – Downtown Eugene, Springfield I-105 begins	East end of OR 99 overlap; west end of freeway and I-105 overlap
Lane	Eugene	0.89	1.43	1	Delta Highway to OR 569 (Beltline Highway)	
Lane	Eugene	1.96	3.15	2	Country Club Road, Coburg Road – Downtown Eugene	
Lane	Springfield	3.50	5.63	4	I-5 – Roseburg, Salem I-105 ends	East end of I-105 overlap; signed as exits 4A (south) and 4B (north); I-5 exits 194A-B
Lane	Springfield	4.67	7.52	—	OR 528 south – Springfield City Center	
Lane	Springfield	6.09	9.80	—	Mohawk Boulevard	
Lane	Springfield	7.51	12.09	—	42nd Street – Marcola	Western access to Weyerhaeuser Complex
Lane	Springfield	9.05	14.56		52nd Street	Eastern access to Weyerhaeuser Complex
Lane	Springfield	9.05	14.56	East end of freeway		
Lane		9.97 6.23	16.05 10.03		OR 126 Bus. west – Springfield City Center	
Lane		54.97 19.81	88.47 31.88		OR 242 east (Scenic Route) – McKenzie Pass	
Linn		0.00 71.69	0.00 115.37		US 20 west – Sweet Home, Lebanon, Albany	West end of US 20 overlap
Linn	Santiam Junction	74.90	120.54		OR 22 west – Detroit, Salem	
Deschutes	Sisters	100.12 92.03	161.13 148.11		OR 242 west (Scenic Route) – McKenzie Pass	
Deschutes	Sisters	93.07	149.78		US 20 east – Bend, Burns	East end of US 20 overlap
Deschutes		107.43	172.89	—	Cline Falls Highway	Interchange
Deschutes	Redmond	111.94 −0.06	180.15 −0.097		US 97 – Madras, Portland, Bend, Klamath Falls	
Crook	Powell Butte	6.84	11.01		Bozarth Road	Former Powell Butte Highway
Crook	Prineville	17.92	28.84		OR 370 west (O'Neil Highway) – O'Neil, Terrebonne	
Crook	Prineville	18.16	29.23		US 26 – Madras, Portland, Prineville City Center, John Day	
1.000 mi = 1.609 km; 1.000 km = 0.621 mi: Concurrency terminus

== Business route ==
Oregon Route 126 Business
- Location: Eugene – Springfield
- Length: 6.64 mi (10.69 km)

OR 126 Business is a state business route of OR 126 that travels for 6.64 miles (10.69 km) through the central districts of Eugene and Springfield. It also forms the westernmost part of McKenzie Highway No. 15 under Oregon's named highways system. At the western terminus of I-105, OR 126 heads west on Sixth Avenue (cosigned with OR 99). From that same terminus, Business OR 126 heads east, also cosigned with OR 99, along Seventh Avenue. This route then proceeds through Eugene's downtown core and turns south at an interchange near the Ferry Street Bridge.

After two blocks, Business OR 126/OR 99 turns east again on East Broadway, which becomes Franklin Boulevard at Alder Street. Franklin Boulevard separates the south shore of the Willamette River from the northern edge of the University of Oregon campus.

Past the university campus and surrounding business district, Business OR 126 and OR 99 split. OR 99 joins southbound I-5, while OR 126 continues eastbound through the community of Glenwood. It then crosses the Willamette River and enters the city of Springfield. Business OR 126 continues east through downtown Springfield, eventually rejoining the main stem of OR 126 in the Thurston neighborhood of the city's east end.
