= Cairo, Oregon =

Unincorporated community in the state of Oregon, United States

- Unincorporated community
- Location within Oregon Location within the United States
- Coordinates: 43°59′46″N 117°00′33″W
- Country: United States
- State: Oregon
- County: Malheur
- Elevation: 2,192 ft (668 m)
- Time zone: UTC-7 (Mountain)
  - Summer (DST): UTC-6 (Mountain)
- Area code: 541
- GNIS feature ID: 1118451

Cairo is an unincorporated community in Malheur County, Oregon, United States. Its elevation is 2,192 feet (668 m) above sea level. It is about 4 miles (6 km) southwest of Ontario and a half mile north of Cairo Junction, where U.S. Route 20 and U.S. Route 26, running concurrently with Oregon Route 201, turn south towards Nyssa. Route 201 also continues north from Cairo Junction through Cairo and towards Ontario.

Cairo was a station on the Oregon Short Line Railroad (OSL) to Vale. The OSL line is now part of the Union Pacific mainline. Cairo Elementary School in Cairo Junction is part of the Ontario School District; the school was built in 1957.
