= Necanicum, Oregon =

Unincorporated community in the state of Oregon, United States

Coordinates: 45.906777°N 123.784855°W

Necanicum is an unincorporated community in Clatsop County, Oregon, United States. It is located approximately 13 miles southeast of Seaside on U.S. Route 26 in the Northern Oregon Coast Range, next to the Necanicum River. Necanicum Junction is about a mile east of the site of the former post office, at the intersection of U.S. 26 and Oregon Route 53. It is served by the Seaside post office.

The post office at this locale was originally named "Ahlers" after Herman Ahlers, a local resident and the first postmaster. Ahlers changed the name of the office to "Push" in 1899, because he expected the place to become an enterprising community. The name was changed to Necanicum in 1907, after the Necanicum River, and the office closed in 1916, with Ahlers still postmaster. "Necanicum" is one of many names in northwest Oregon beginning with ne, which is a Native American prefix indicating a place. Necanicum is derived from Ne-hay-ne-hum, the name of a Native American lodge upstream. The journal of the Oregon Pioneer Association gave the name as "Nekonikon" in 1887. Herman Ahlers said the name meant "a gap in the mountains". The current spelling was adopted by a decision of the United States Board on Geographic Names in 1915, as the most common local usage over "Necanacum" and "Nekanakum".

In 1915, Necanicum had a population of 50. As of 1990, there was a store and a café at Necanicum Junction.
