= Paulina, Oregon =

Unincorporated community in the state of Oregon, United States

- Unincorporated community
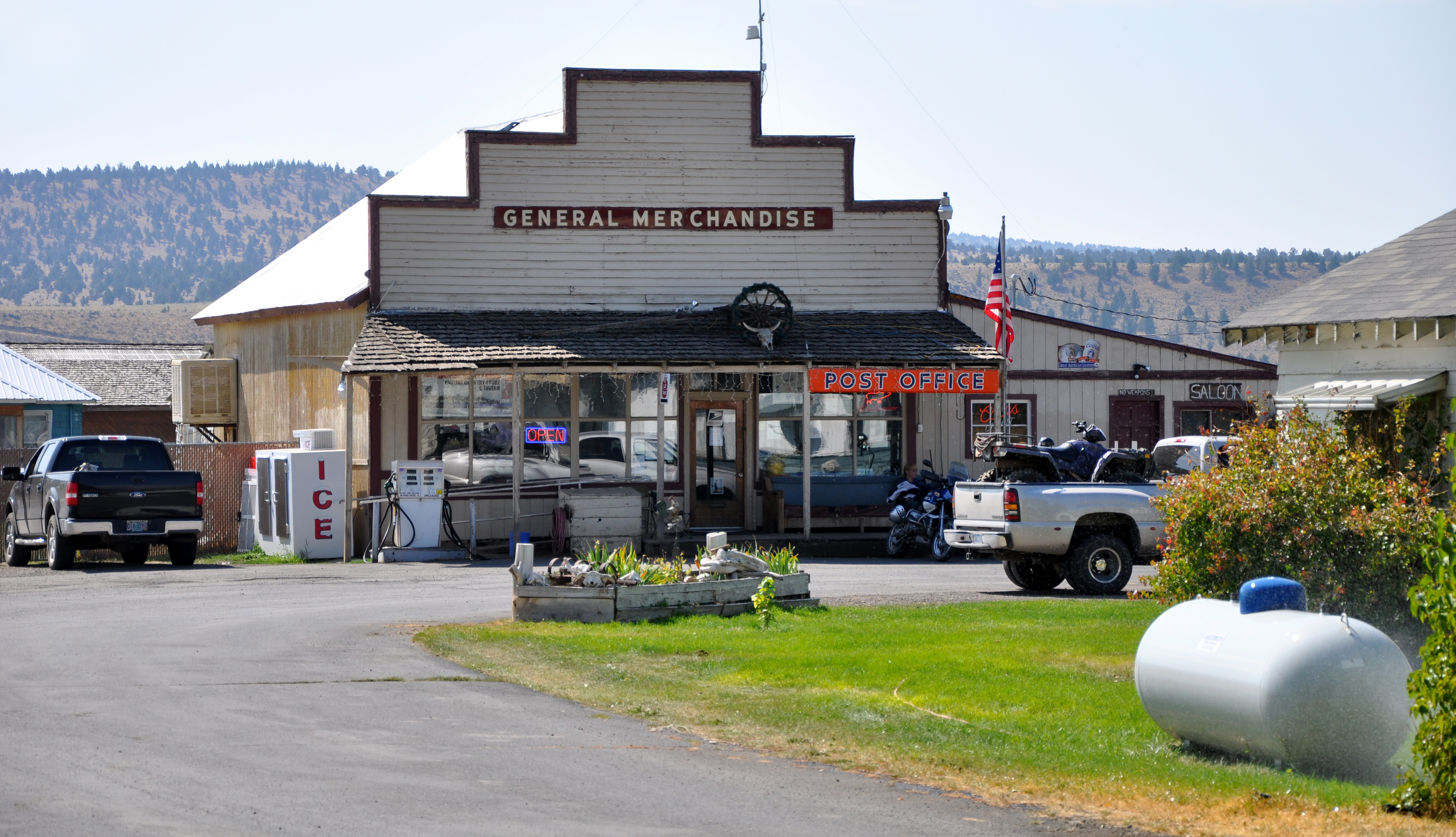
- Paulina general store and post office

- Location in Oregon Paulina (the United States)
- Coordinates: 44.13375°N 119.96276°W
- Country: United States
- State: Oregon
- County: Crook
- Established: Post office opened in 1882
- Elevation: 3,688 ft (1,124 m)
- Time zone: UTC-8 (Pacific)
  - Summer (DST): UTC-7 (Pacific)
- ZIP code: 97751

Paulina (/pɔːˈlaɪ.nə/ paw-LY-nə) is an unincorporated community in Crook County, Oregon, United States. It is about 55 miles (89 km) east of Prineville on Oregon Route 380. It was named after Paiute Chief Paulina. Paulina post office was established in 1882. Paulina has one K-8 grade school. The community is the home of the Paulina Rodeo, which was the subject of a Kim Stafford poem, and the Paulina Ranger District of the Ochoco National Forest.

== Climate ==
According to the Köppen Climate Classification system, Paulina has a semi-arid climate, abbreviated "BSk" on climate maps.

Climate data for Paulina
Month	Jan	Feb	Mar	Apr	May	Jun	Jul	Aug	Sep	Oct	Nov	Dec	Year
Record high °F (°C)	59 (15)	71 (22)	78 (26)	87 (31)	98 (37)	99 (37)	106 (41)	105 (41)	101 (38)	92 (33)	74 (23)	65 (18)	106 (41)
Mean daily maximum °F (°C)	38.9 (3.8)	45.4 (7.4)	52.5 (11.4)	59.7 (15.4)	68.5 (20.3)	77.2 (25.1)	86.7 (30.4)	86.2 (30.1)	78.6 (25.9)	66.1 (18.9)	48.2 (9.0)	39.6 (4.2)	62.3 (16.8)
Mean daily minimum °F (°C)	17.6 (−8.0)	22.1 (−5.5)	25.2 (−3.8)	27.8 (−2.3)	34 (1)	40 (4)	43.4 (6.3)	41.5 (5.3)	33.6 (0.9)	26.5 (−3.1)	23.9 (−4.5)	18.3 (−7.6)	29.5 (−1.4)
Record low °F (°C)	−36 (−38)	−33 (−36)	1 (−17)	7 (−14)	8 (−13)	18 (−8)	26 (−3)	21 (−6)	11 (−12)	−9 (−23)	−20 (−29)	−38 (−39)	−38 (−39)
Average precipitation inches (mm)	1.31 (33)	0.77 (20)	0.98 (25)	0.97 (25)	1.23 (31)	1 (25)	0.6 (15)	0.6 (15)	0.47 (12)	0.84 (21)	1.29 (33)	1.22 (31)	11.27 (286)
Average snowfall inches (cm)	6.9 (18)	2.8 (7.1)	1.7 (4.3)	0.6 (1.5)	0.1 (0.25)	0 (0)	0 (0)	0 (0)	0 (0)	0.2 (0.51)	2.6 (6.6)	7.4 (19)	22.3 (57)
Average precipitation days	7	6	8	7	6	5	3	3	3	5	8	8	69

== Education ==
There is one school district in the county: Crook County School District. Residents attend Paulina Elementary School, a K-8 school. What became the school's main building opened in 1949.

After Paulina elementary, they attend Crook County High School in Prineville. The bus ride to Crook County High each way is two hours.

Crook County is in the boundary of Central Oregon Community College.
