= State highways in Oregon =

Highway system of Oregon in the United States

- Standard route signage in Oregon

Highway names
- Interstates: Interstate nn (I-nn)
- US Highways: U.S. Route nn (US nn)
- State: Oregon Route nn (OR nn)
- Named highways: xx Highway No. nn

System links
- Oregon Highways; Interstate; US; State; Named; Scenic

The state highway system of the U.S. state of Oregon is a network of highways that are owned and maintained by the Highway Division of the Oregon Department of Transportation (ODOT).

== Highways and routes ==
The state highway system consists of about 8,000 miles (13,000 km) of state highways, that is, roadways owned and maintained by ODOT. When minor connections and frontage roads are removed, that number drops to approximately 7,400 miles (11,900 km) or around 9% of the total road mileage in the state. Oregon's portion of the Interstate Highway System totals 729.57 miles (1,174.13 km). Transfers of highways between the state and county or local maintenance require the approval of the Oregon Transportation Commission (OTC), a five-member governor-appointed authority that meets monthly. These transfers often result in discontinuous highways, where a local government maintains part or all of a main road within its boundaries.

Two separate numbering systems are used: routes (e.g. Interstate 84, U.S. Route 26, and Oregon Route 140) are those used by the general public, and their shields are posted on guide signs and maps. These comprise the Interstate Highways, U.S. Highways, and Oregon state routes (e.g. OR 201). Highways, on the other hand, are used internally by ODOT; they are named and numbered (e.g. Pacific Highway No. 1, Willamette Highway No. 18). The two systems, while largely overlapping, are not congruent. Many routes are signed on streets which are maintained by counties and cities, and thus are not part of the state highway system at all, e.g. OR 8, whose eastern- and westernmost portions, Canyon Road and Gales Creek Road, are not actually state highways. On the other hand, some state highways are not signed as routes at all; the Beaverton–Tualatin Highway No. 141 has an official route designation (OR 141), but remains entirely unsigned. Signed routes may comprise several highways; for instance, OR 47 is overlaid on the Mist–Clatskanie Highway No. 110, Nehalem Highway No. 102, and Tualatin Valley Highway No. 29. Likewise, highways may consist of several routes; Tualatin Valley Highway No. 29 comprises parts of OR 8 and OR 47. Every highway is fully state-maintained, and every route is at least partially state-maintained.

The OTC designates the paths of these routes as they follow state highways and local roads; any U.S. Route or Interstate numbers must also be approved by the American Association of State Highway and Transportation Officials (AASHTO). Route signs are maintained by the same agency as the roads they are posted along. If a local government maintains a numbered route, it signs an agreement with the state to keep the signs posted, thus keeping a continuous route for the benefit of travelers.

== History ==
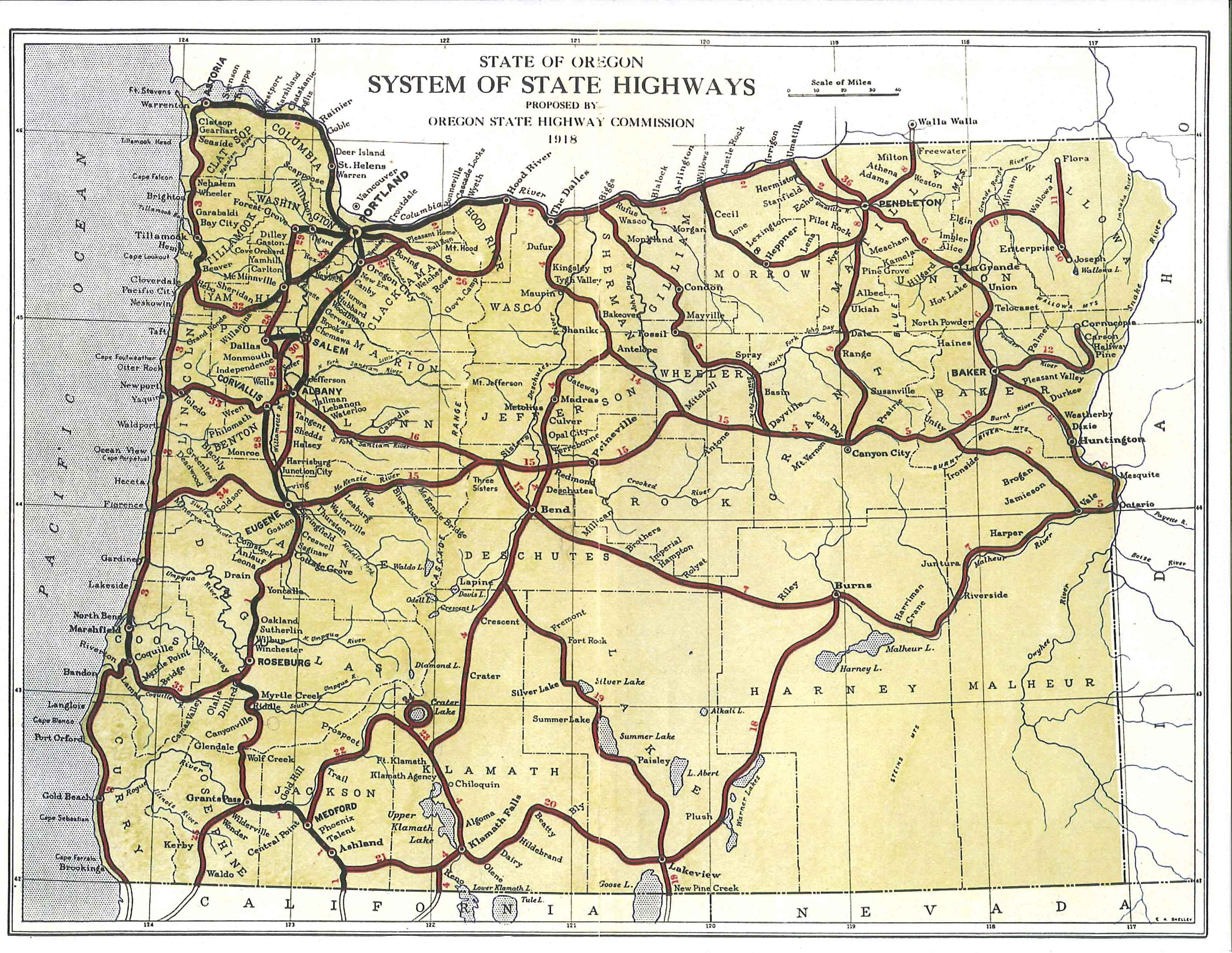
1918 state highway map

The initial primary state highway system was designated in 1917, initially consisting of 36 named and numbered highways, including some designated earlier that year by the Oregon State Legislature and others added to the network by the Oregon State Highway Commission, the predecessor to the OTC. The first signed routes were the U.S. Routes, in 1926. It was not until 1932 that Oregon Routes were numbered by the OTC and marked by the Oregon State Highway Department; every primary state highway that was not already part of a U.S. Route received a route number at that time. Starting in late 1931, the state took over maintenance of many county "market roads", which became secondary state highways with three-digit numbers; some of these were assigned route numbers in 1935, but many others remained unsigned.

1940s-style sign for Oregon Route 50, incorporating the Seal of Oregon

The primary, two-digit route numbers were laid out in a grid system, similar to the Interstate Highway System. Odd-numbered routes were north–south and increased in number bearing west, ranging from OR 3 in Wallowa County to OR 53 in Clatsop and Tillamook counties. Even-numbered routes were east–west and increased in number bearing south, ranging from OR 6 in Tillamook and Washington counties to OR 70 in Klamath County. East–west highways in eastern Oregon were given route numbers between OR 74 and OR 86, again increasing in number to the south. Despite this pattern, the internally used highway numbers for primary highways remained ad-hoc. A few route numbers were added after the 1930s, and broke these patterns for continuity reasons: OR 99, OR 126, OR 138, and OR 140.

Secondary route numbers, three digits starting with 2, were laid out to generally increase bearing west. They ranged from OR 201 in Malheur County to OR 240 in Yamhill County. The internally used highway numbers for secondary highways were also three digit numbers, but were designated by county, from No. 10X in Clatsop County, No. 11X in Columbia County, No. 12X in Multnomah County, etc., until No. 45X in Malheur County. In 2002 and 2003, ODOT decided to assign route numbers to most of the previously unsigned secondary highways. Typically, these new route numbers were identical to the old highway numbers, and range from OR 103 to OR 454. In cases where the highway number was already in use by a different route, the first digit of the new route number was changed to 5 (e.g. Cape Arago Hwy No. 240, designated OR 540 in 2003). Most of these new route numbers are unsigned as of 2015.

Two state highways lack route numbers: Century Drive Hwy No. 372 and Midland Hwy No. 420.

== Cancelled or demolished highways ==
The following highways were constructed and/or planned, and then subsequently demolished or cancelled. In some cases, the cancellation resulted from freeway revolts.

- Mount Hood Freeway (Approaches built, project cancelled in 1974)
- Rose City Freeway (Project cancelled in 1974)
- Harbor Drive (Built in 1950, demolished in 1974)
- Roosevelt Freeway (Project cancelled in 1978)
- West Eugene Parkway (Project cancelled in 2006)
- Interstate 305 (Partially built as an expressway in 1986)
- Interstate 505 (Partially built, main segment cancelled in 1979)
- Alsea-Deadwood Highway (OR 501) (Partially built, never finished, partial route still in use; complete route cancelled 1936).
