= List of U.S. Highways in Oregon =

United States Numbered Highways of the Oregon Highway System
- Highway markers for US 20 and US 101

System information
- Maintained by ODOT
- Formed: November 11, 1926

Highway names
- Interstates: Interstate nn (I-nn)
- US Highways: U.S. Route nn (US nn)
- State: Oregon Route nn (OR nn)
- Named highways: xx Highway No. nn

System links
- Oregon Highways; Interstate; US; State; Named; Scenic

The United States Numbered Highways in Oregon are the segments of the national United States Numbered Highways System that are owned and maintained by the U.S. state of Oregon. On a national level, the standards and numbering for the system are handled by the American Association of State Highway and Transportation Officials (AASHTO), while the highways in Oregon are maintained by the Oregon Department of Transportation (ODOT).

== Mainline highways ==
Number	Length (mi)	Length (km)	Southern or western terminus	Northern or eastern terminus	Formed	Removed	Notes
US 20	451.25	726.22	US 101 in Newport	US 20/US 26 towards Boise, ID	1940	current	
US 26	471.56	758.90	US 101 south of Seaside	US 20/US 26 towards Boise, ID	1952	current	
US 28	462	744	OR 99 in Eugene	Former US 30 in Ontario	1926	1952	Now US 26 and OR 126
US 30	477.02	767.69	US 101 in Astoria	US 30 in Fruitland, ID	1926	current	
US 30N	—	—	Former US 30 south of Huntington	Weiser, ID	1927	1980	
US 30S	—	—	US 30 in Ontario	Towards Parma, ID	1938	1940	
US 95	121.30	195.21	US 95 towards Winnemucca, NV	US 95 towards Homedale, ID	1939	current	
US 97	289.31	465.60	US 97 towards Weed, CA	US 97 towards Yakima, WA	1926	current	
US 99	570.75	918.53	Towards Weed, CA	Vancouver, WA	1926	1972	Replaced by I-5 and OR 99
US 99E	—	—	OR 99/OR 99W in Junction City	OR 99/OR 99W in Portland	1928	1972	Now OR 99E
US 99W	—	—	OR 99/OR 99E in Junction City	OR 99/OR 99E in Portland	1928	1972	Now OR 99W
US 101	363.11	584.37	US 101 towards Crescent City, CA	US 101 towards Aberdeen, WA	1926	current	
US 126	—	—	OR 99 in Eugene	US 26 in Prineville	1952	1972	Now OR 126
US 197	67.17	108.10	US 97 at Shaniko Junction	US 197 towards Dallesport, WA	1952	current	
US 199	43.57	70.12	US 199 towards Crescent City, CA	I-5/OR 99 in Grants Pass	1926	current	
US 395	325.36	523.62	US 395 towards Alturas, CA	I-82/US 395 towards Tri-Cities, WA	1934	current	
US 630	—	—	Former US 30 south of Huntington	Weiser, ID	1926	1927	
US 730	35.70	57.45	I-84/US 30 east of Boardman	US 730 towards Walla Walla, WA	1926	current	
Former

== Auxiliary highways ==
Number	Length (mi)	Length (km)	Southern or western terminus	Northern or eastern terminus	Formed	Removed	Notes
US 20 Bus.	—	—	US 20 northwest of Toledo	US 20 northeast of Toledo	1980	current	
US 20 Bus.	—	—	US 20/US 97B in Bend	US 20/US 97B in Bend	1980	current	
US 30 Bus.	—	—	I-84/US 30/OR 201 north of Ontario	I-84/US 30 in Ontario	1980	current	
US 30 Bus.	—	—	US 30 south of Saint Helens	South first street in Saint Helens	—	—	
US 30 Bus.	—	—	OR 99E in Portland	US 30BY in Portland	1967	2007	
US 30 Byp.	—	—	US 30 in Portland	I-84/US 30 in Fairview	1936	current	
US 95 Spur	—	—	OR 201 south of Huntington	US 95S in Weiser, ID	1980	current	
US 97 Bus.	—	—	US 97 in Klamath Falls	US 97 in Klamath Falls	1980	current	
US 97 Bus.	—	—	US 97 in Bend	US 20/US 97 in Bend	1980	current	
US 101 Bus.	—	—	US 101 in Warrenton	US 101 in Astoria	1967	current	
Former
