= Oregon State Scenic Byways =

Highway names
- US Highways: U.S. Route nn (US nn)
- State: Oregon Route nn (OR nn)
- Named highways: xx Highway No. nn
- Forest Routes: Forest Route xx

System links
- Oregon Highways; Interstate; US; State; Named; Scenic

State scenic byways in Oregon are roads classified as scenic by the state of Oregon. These byways may also be classified as Back Country Byways or National Scenic Byways in addition to being State Scenic Byways and touring routes. In addition to the other byway classifications, Oregon has four designated All-American Roads in the National Scenic Byway program and six National Scenic Byways.

== Scenic byways ==
Name	Length (mi)	Length (km)	Notes
Blue Mountain	145	233	
Cascade Lakes	66	106	Also a National Scenic Byway
Elkhorn Drive	106	171	
Hells Canyon	208	335	Also an All-American Road
High Desert Discovery	127	204	
Historic Columbia River Highway	70	110	Also an All-American Road
Journey Through Time	286	460	
Marys Peak To Pacific	72	116	
McKenzie Pass-Santiam Pass	82	132	Also a National Scenic Byway
McKenzie River	34	55	
Mount Hood	100	160	Also a National Scenic Byway
Oregon Outback	171	275	Also a National Scenic Byway
Over The Rivers And Through The Woods	66	106	
Pacific Coast	363	584	Also an All-American Road
Rogue-Umpqua	172	277	Also a National Scenic Byway
Trees To Sea	68	109	
Umpqua River	66	106	
Volcanic Legacy	140 (Note: Extends outside of Oregon into California. Total route length is 500 miles (Federal Highway Administration).)	230	Also an All-American Road
West Cascades	215	346	Also a National Scenic Byway

== Tour routes ==
Name	Length (mi)	Length (km)	Notes
Charleston to Bandon	41	66	This route follows OR 540 and other connector roads to Bandon from Charleston .
Cottage Grove Covered Bridge	20	32	This route passes through several covered bridges, stretching from Cottage Grove to Dorena.
Cow Creek	45	72	Also a back country byway, this route follows Cow creek from Riddle to Azalea.
Diamond Loop	69	111	Forming a loop road around Diamond Valley, along with the Diamond Craters.
East Steens	143	230	This route travels along the east slopes of Steens Mountain, starting from Burns and ending in Fields.
Grande Tour	80	130	Traveling through La Grande, Cove, Union and Medical Springs, this double-loop style route travels along the Grande Ronde Valley and the accompanying Wallowa Mountains.
Myrtle Creek-Canyonville	68	109	This loop off of Interstate 5 connects Myrtle Creek and Canyonville, passing through parts of the Umpqua National Forest, the Tiller Ranger Station, and Milo Academy Bridge.
Silver Falls	55	89	Mainly running along Oregon Route 214, this route travels through Silver Falls State Park.
Steens Loop	59	95	This route passes by Frenchglen Hotel State Heritage Site, travelling through the Steens Mountain Wilderness north of Steens Mountain. This loop connects to Oregon Route 205.
Vineyard and Valley	57	92	This route travels along country roads through Sherwood, Forest Grove and North Plains, along various vineyards and farmland.
