= List of Interstate Highways in Oregon =

Interstate Highways of the Oregon Highway System
- Highway markers for Interstates in Oregon
- Interstate Highways highlighted in red

System information
- Maintained by ODOT
- Formed: June 29, 1956

Highway names
- Interstates: Interstate nn (I-nn)
- US Highways: U.S. Route nn (US nn)
- State: Oregon Route nn (OR nn)
- Named highways: xx Highway No. nn

System links
- Oregon Highways; Interstate; US; State; Named; Scenic

The Interstate Highways in Oregon are the segments of the national Dwight D. Eisenhower System of Interstate and Defense Highways that are owned and maintained by the U.S. state of Oregon. On a national level, the standards and numbering for the system are handled by the Federal Highway Administration (FHWA) and the American Association of State Highway and Transportation Officials (AASHTO), while the highways in Oregon are maintained by the Oregon Department of Transportation (ODOT).

These highways are built to Interstate Highway standards, meaning they are all freeways with minimum requirements for full control of access, design speeds of 50 to 70 miles per hour (80 to 115 km/h) depending on type of terrain, a minimum of two travel lanes in each direction, and specific widths of lanes or shoulders; exceptions from these standards have to be approved by the FHWA. The numbering scheme used to designate the Interstates was developed by AASHTO, an organization composed of the various state departments of transportation in the United States.

The Oregon state government initially proposed numbering the auxiliary Interstates using lettered suffixes, but were denied in 1958 by the American Association of State Highway Officials (forerunner to the AASHTO). The last section of the Interstate Highway system to be built in Oregon, on I-82 near Hermiston, opened on September 20, 1988.

== Primary Interstate Highways ==
Number	Length (mi)	Length (km)	Southern or western terminus	Northern or eastern terminus	Formed	Removed	Notes
I-5	308.14	495.90	I-5 at the California state line	I-5 at the Washington state line	1957	current	
I-80N	375.17	603.78	I-5 / US 30 in Portland	I-80N at the Idaho state line	1957	1980	Renumbered to I-84
I-82	11.01	17.72	I-82 at the Washington state line	I-84 / US 30 in Umatilla County	1957	current	
I-84	375.17	603.78	I-5 / US 30 in Portland	I-84 at the Idaho state line	1980	current	
Former

== Auxiliary Interstate Highways ==
Number	Length (mi)	Length (km)	Southern or western terminus	Northern or eastern terminus	Formed	Removed
I-105	3.49	5.62	OR 99 / OR 126 / OR 126 Bus. in Eugene	I-5 / OR 126 in Springfield	c. 1957	current
I-205	26.07	41.96	I-5 in Tualatin	I-205 at the Washington state line	1958	current
I-305	—	—	Salem	I-5 in Salem	c. 1957	1967
I-405	3.53	5.68	I-5 in Portland	I-5 / US 30 in Portland	1958	current
I-505	—	—	US 30 in Portland	I-405 / US 30 in Portland	c. 1957	1988
Former
