= Ritner Creek =

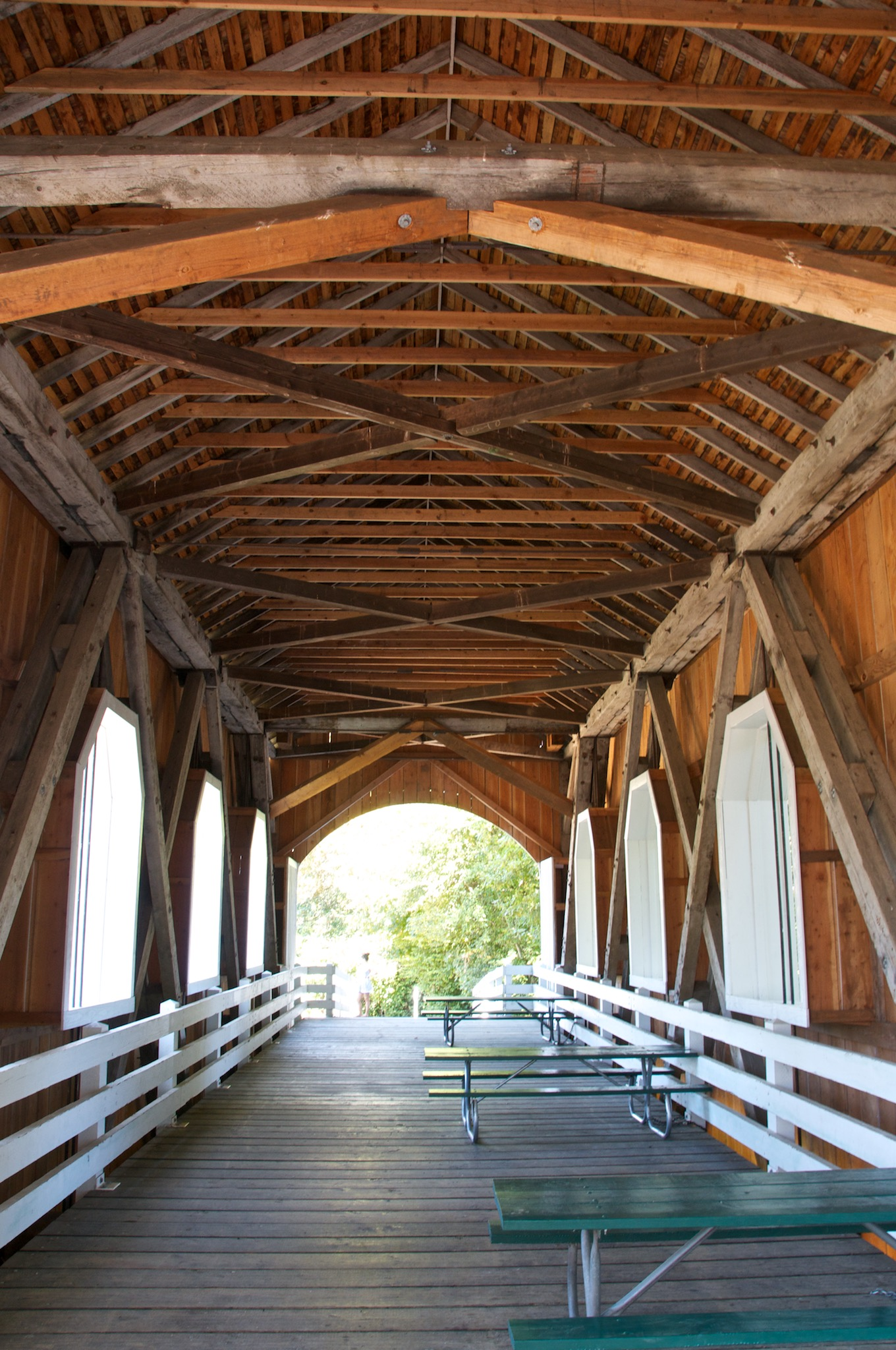
- Ritner Creek Bridge interior in 2011

- Location of the mouth of Ritner Creek in Oregon
- Etymology: For Sebastian Ritner, a settler whose donation land claim was along the creek

Location
- Country: United States
- State: Oregon
- County: Polk

Physical characteristics
- Source: Central Oregon Coast Range
  - location: near Bald Mountain
  - coordinates: 44°46′27″N 123°32′29″W
  - elevation: 1,292 ft (394 m)
- Mouth: Luckiamute River
  - location: south of Pedee
  - coordinates: 44°43′43″N 123°26′36″W
  - elevation: 279 ft (85 m)

Ritner Creek is a tributary of the Luckiamute River in Polk County in the U.S. state of Oregon. The creek begins near Bald Mountain in the Central Oregon Coast Range and flows generally southeast to meet the Luckiamute southwest of Pedee and north of Kings Valley. The confluence is 31 miles (50 km) upstream of the Luckiamute's mouth on the Willamette River. Named tributaries of Ritner Creek from source to mouth are Sheythe, Love, Clayton, and Kinsey creeks.

Ritner Creek passes under Oregon Route 223 just before entering the river. The Ritner Creek Bridge, a 75-foot (23 m) covered bridge, carried the highway over the creek until 1976. Replaced by a concrete span, it was the last covered bridge on an Oregon state highway.

== Name ==
The creek was named for Sebastian Ritner, who emigrated to Oregon in 1845. His donation land claim included part of the creek. A railroad station named Ritner was part of the Valley and Siletz Railroad. It was along the line about 2 miles (3 km) north of Kings Valley.

== Parks ==
The covered bridge was saved and moved to an adjacent site that doubles as a small county park, the Minnie Ritner Ruiter Wayside. The park, open all year during daylight hours, has picnic tables and a portable restroom.

Further upstream along Gage Road and Ritner Creek is Ritner Creek Park, another county recreation site. Amenities include fire pits, picnic tables, walking trails, and a restroom. This park is also open all year between sunrise and a half-hour after sunset.

== See also ==
- List of rivers of Oregon
