= Fort Hoskins =

Former military post in Oregon, United States

- Benton County, Oregon
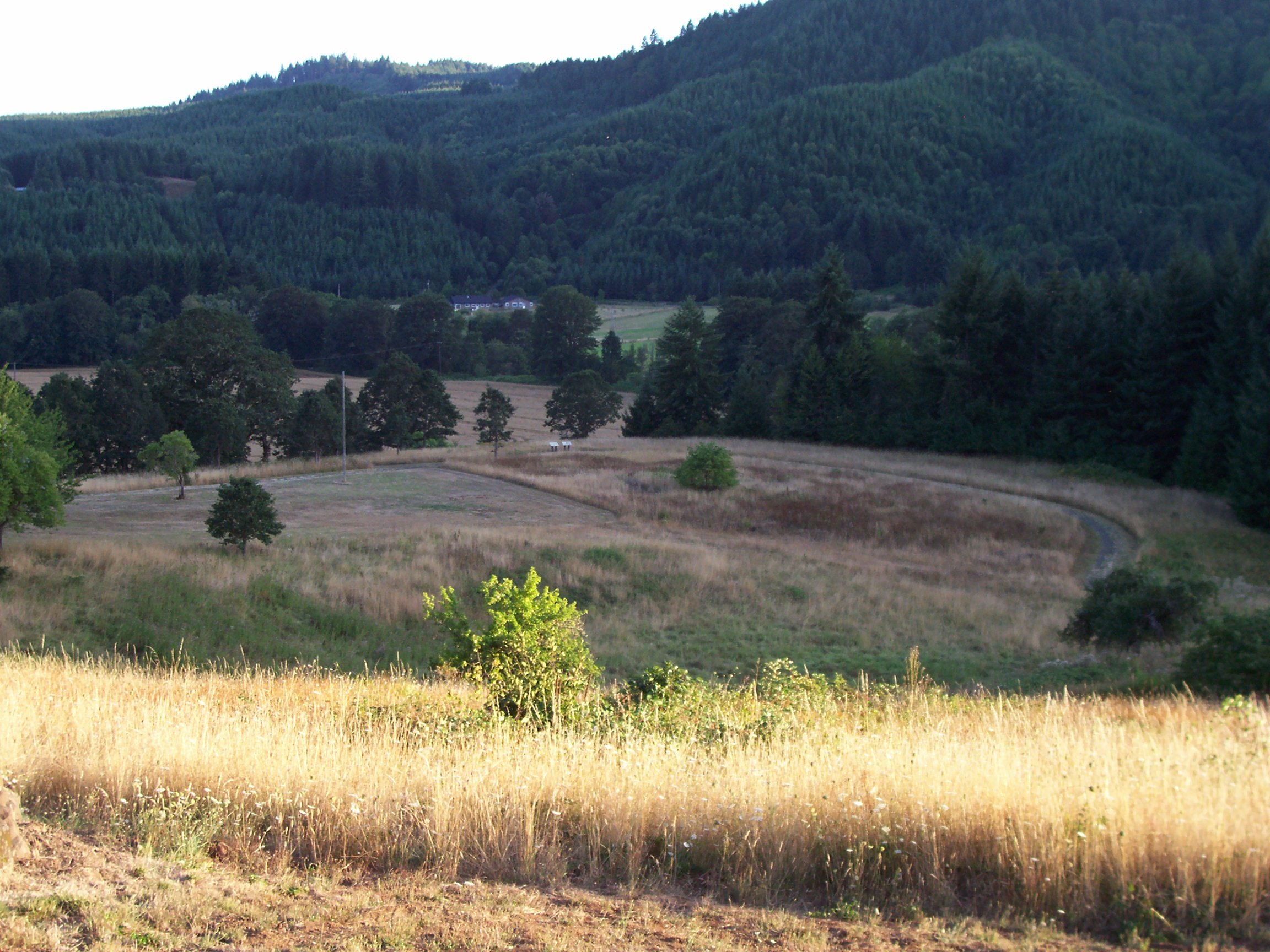
- Grounds of the former Fort Hoskins

Site information
- Type: Military base
- Controlled by: United States Army

Site history
- Materials: Wood
- Events
- Fort Hoskins Site
- U.S. National Register of Historic Places
- Location within Oregon
- Location: 38150 Ft. Hoskins Road Philomath, Oregon
- Nearest city: Kings Valley, Oregon
- Coordinates: 44.677°N 123.462°W
- Area: 130 acres (53 ha)
- Built: 1856
- Architect: Christopher Columbus Augur
- Website: nape.bentoncountyor.gov/parks/fort-hoskins-historical-park/
- NRHP reference No.: 74001672
- Added to NRHP: May 1, 1974

Garrison information
- Garrison: 4th Regiment of California Infantry
- Occupants: 2nd Lt.Philip Sheridan, Capt.Christopher C. Augur

Fort Hoskins was one of three "forts" (which were actually unfortified posts) built by the U.S. Army to monitor the Coastal Indian Reservation in Oregon Territory (later the U.S. State of Oregon) in the mid-19th century. The Fort Hoskins Site is listed on the National Register of Historic Places. Fort Hoskins was garrisoned by a number of companies of soldiers throughout its short existence, and future Union Civil War generals Christopher Columbus Augur and Phil Sheridan were stationed there.

== History ==
Construction on the post began in 1856 on the Luckiamute River under the supervision of then Captain Christopher C. Augur. Fort Hoskins was finished in 1857, with then-lieutenant Philip Sheridan in charge, and was named after Lt. Charles Hoskins, who had died in the Mexican–American War. The fort was located about 19 miles northwest of Corvallis.

Captain Augur was assigned to Fort Hoskins as its first post commander from 25 July 1856 to 2 July 1861. He and his growing family became the first occupants of their newly constructed residence on Fort Hoskin's "Officer's Row." 2nd Lt. Phil Sheridan oversaw the construction of Fort Hoskins during this period. Two soldiers who were stationed at the fort during the American Civil War kept journals of their experiences: Royal A. Bensell and William M. Hilleary. Their accounts are of unmitigated boredom and dampness, but they provide a good picture of 19th-century life in the area.

Fort Hoskins played an indirectly important role in local and state history because of the leadership of several out-of-state soldiers who decided to stay in the area after they were mustered out of the army. Several placenames in the area, such as Kings Valley, are connected with these soldiers. The fort never saw any action, though a bloodless insurrection by Native Americans at Yaquina Bay was put down by the soldiers. After the Civil War ended, it was discovered that Fort Hoskins had been an outpost of interest to the former Confederate government. Fort Hoskins was abandoned in 1865.

== Archeological site ==
The site of the fort was listed on the National Register of Historic Places in 1974.

In 2002, Benton County opened the site as Fort Hoskins Historical Park. In 2012, the fort commander's house was moved back to its original site at Fort Hoskins from nearby Pedee, where it had been moved after the fort was closed. In 2015, Benton County approved funds for an exterior restoration of the house.

== Community and post office ==
The community of Hoskins was located at 44°40′36″N 123°28′07″W, west of Oregon Route 223's intersection with Hoskins Road, northwest of Wren and southwest of Kings Valley. Hoskins post office, named for the long-abandoned fort, was established in 1891 and ran until 1965. Hoskins was a station on and the headquarters of the Valley and Siletz Railroad, and a mercantile community, including a tavern and a store, grew up around the railroad. Railroad infrastructure at Hoskins included a yard and a roundhouse, as well a shop building constructed around 1914. In 1915, the population of Hoskins was 150, and the community had a school. At one time there was a covered bridge across the Luckiamute at this location. According to author Ralph Friedman, the yards, roundhouse, and covered bridge were all gone by 1990, and the only business remaining by 1972 was the tavern. The James Watson House, part of the National Register of Historic Places–listed Watson–Price Farmstead in Hoskins, was built in the 1850s and is thought to be the first plastered house in the state. The Samuel Frantz (Dunn-Frantz) House was converted to a residence after serving as the fort's infirmary; it is now part of the county park.

== See also ==
- 4th Regiment of California Infantry
- Fort Dalles
- Fort Yamhill
