= Shaw, Oregon =

Unincorporated community in Oregon, United States

Coordinates: 44°52′22″N 122°52′19″W

Shaw is an unincorporated community in Marion County, Oregon, United States, on Oregon Route 214 near its intersection with Oregon Route 22. It is about 10 miles southeast of Salem, and was annexed into the city of Aumsville.

The Shaw area was settled by pioneer Daniel Waldo in the 1840s.

Shaw was a station in the Waldo Hills between Macleay and Aumsville on the Oregonian Railway (later the Southern Pacific Railroad and today the Willamette Valley Railway). In 1881, the station was named "Waldo Hills". Shaw post office was established in 1887 and named for Angus Shaw, the town's first postmaster. Shaw was from Ontario, Canada and settled in the area 1876. In 1891, the name of the town was changed to "Shaw" after Angus.

In 1915, Shaw had two grain mills; these no longer exist. The post office closed in 1937. As of 2005, Shaw had 18 dwellings, a machine shop, a general store building, a warehouse, and a church.
