= Bridgeport, Oregon =

Bridgeport, Oregon may refer to:

- Bridgeport, Baker County, Oregon
- Bridgeport, Polk County, Oregon
