= Salem Parkway =

Salem Parkway may refer to:

- Oregon Route 99E Business
- Salem Parkway (North Carolina)
