= Salem Public Library (Oregon) =

Public library in Salem, Oregon, U.S.

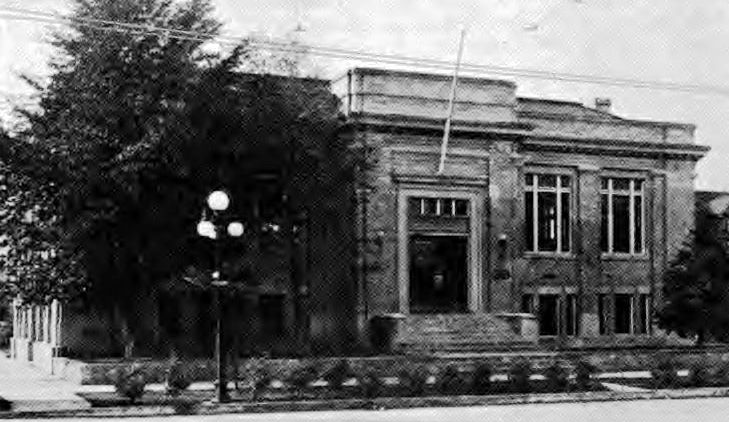
- Old Salem library, ca. 1920
- 44°56′07″N 123°02′32″W
- Location: Salem, Oregon, United States
- Type: Public library
- Established: 1904; 122 years ago
- Branches: 2

Collection
- Size: 398,869 items

Access and use
- Circulation: 1,148,570
- Population served: 177,694
- Members: 51,953

Other information
- Budget: $7,170,479
- Employees: 56
- Website: cityofsalem.net/library
- References: Oregon Public Library Statistics, 2021–2022

The Salem Public Library is a public library system serving Salem, Oregon, United States. The system includes two branches and is a member of the Chemeketa Cooperative Regional Library Service, which serves the Salem metropolitan area.

== History ==
The Salem Public Library was established by the Salem Woman's Club in May 1904, with 50 donated books, and located in the city council chamber beginning later that year. The library board appealed to industrialist Andrew Carnegie to fund the construction of a permanent library, and was granted $27,500. The library, located at the corner of State and Winter streets, opened on September 12, 1912.

The Salem Public Library was a founding member of the Chemeketa Cooperative Regional Library Service, a regional reference and catalogue system serving the Mid-Willamette Valley area, when it began in 1974. In 2004, library supporters attempted to create a consolidated library district for Salem, to be funded by a permanent property tax, but were rejected by voters in the November 2004 election.

=== Main Library ===
The downtown library was relocated to a larger building in the new civic center on July 6, 1972. The library was closed in December 1989 to begin a $5 million renovation, which was completed on January 26, 1991, and added 35,000 square feet (3,300 m^{2}) of space. A $18.6 million seismic and safety upgrade was completed in 2021.

=== West Salem Branch ===
The Salem Public Library opened a branch in West Salem on October 17, 1957, in the former West Salem city hall. The library moved to a larger, 5,400-square-foot (500 m^{2}) facility at the Oak Hills Shopping Center on April 5, 1987.
