= Oregon Highway 32 =

There is no present signed highway numbered 32 in the U.S. state of Oregon. Oregon Highway 32 may refer to:

- U.S. Route 395, known in Oregon as Oregon Route 32 from 1945 to 1973
- Oregon Route 22, which includes a section known as Three Rivers Highway No. 32
