= Oregon Route 51 =

State highway in northwestern Oregon, US

Oregon Route 51
- Route 51 highlighted in red

Route information
- Maintained by ODOT
- Length: 8.69 mi (13.99 km)
- Component highways: Monmouth–Independence Highway No. 43; Independence Highway No. 193

Major junctions
- South end: OR 99W / OR 194 in Monmouth
- North end: OR 22 near Rickreall

Location
- Country: United States
- State: Oregon

Highway system
- Oregon Highways; Interstate; US; State; Named; Scenic
← OR 47	→ OR 52

Oregon Route 51 is an Oregon state highway running between Monmouth, Oregon and an intersection with Oregon Route 22 west of Salem. OR 51 traverses several highways of the Oregon state highway system: the Monmouth–Independence Highway No. 43 and the Independence Highway No. 193. The route lies completely within Polk County. The Independence Highway previously continued south to US 20.

== Route description ==
OR 51 starts, at its southern terminus, in the city of Monmouth, at an intersection with Oregon Route 99W and Oregon Route 194. It heads due east from there for approximately 2 1/2 miles, reaching the neighboring city of Independence. In Independence, it turns north, running parallel to the Willamette River, and continues for 6 miles (9.7 km). OR 51 terminates at an intersection with OR 22 near Brunks Corner.

While no significant improvements are planned to OR 51 itself; a proposed project to improve OR 22 includes conversion of the (notoriously dangerous) intersection between OR 51 and OR 22 into a grade-separated interchange.

== Major intersections ==
Milepoints are as reported by ODOT and do not necessarily reflect current mileage. Z indicates overlapping mileage due to construction longer than established route, and – indicates negative mileage behind established beginning point. Segments that are locally maintained may be omitted. For routes traversing multiple named state highways, each milepoint is preceded by the corresponding state highway number. The entire route is in Polk County.

Location	Milepoint	Destinations	Notes
Monmouth	43 0.00	OR 194 – Monmouth City Center, Kings Valley	Continuation beyond southern terminus
Monmouth	43 0.00	OR 99W – Corvallis, McMinnville	
Independence	43 2.35 193 6.34	South Main Street – Buena Vista, Albany	
	193 0.00	OR 22 – Salem, Dallas	
1.000 mi = 1.609 km; 1.000 km = 0.621 mi
