= Luckiamute =

Luckiamute may refer to:

- The Luckiamute band of the Kalapuya people of what is now the U.S. state of Oregon
- The Luckiamute River, named for the Kalapuya band
