= Oregon Route 99E Business =

State highway business loop in Oregon, United States

Oregon Route 99E Business
- Salem Highway No. 72
- OR 99E highlighted in red

Route information
- Auxiliary route of OR 99E
- Maintained by Oregon Department of Transportation and City of Salem (Chemawa Road portion)
- Length: 9.77 mi (15.72 km)

Major junctions
- South end: I-5 / OR 22 / OR 99E in Salem
- OR 22 in Salem
- North end: OR 99E in Salem

Location
- Country: United States
- State: Oregon

Highway system
- Oregon Highways; Interstate; US; State; Named; Scenic

Oregon Route 99E Business (OR 99E Business) is a business route through Salem, Oregon for Oregon Route 99E, which bypasses downtown via Interstate 5 (I-5). A portion of this highway was originally planned to be a freeway, signed as Interstate 305; however the proposed freeway was cancelled after community opposition.

== Route description ==
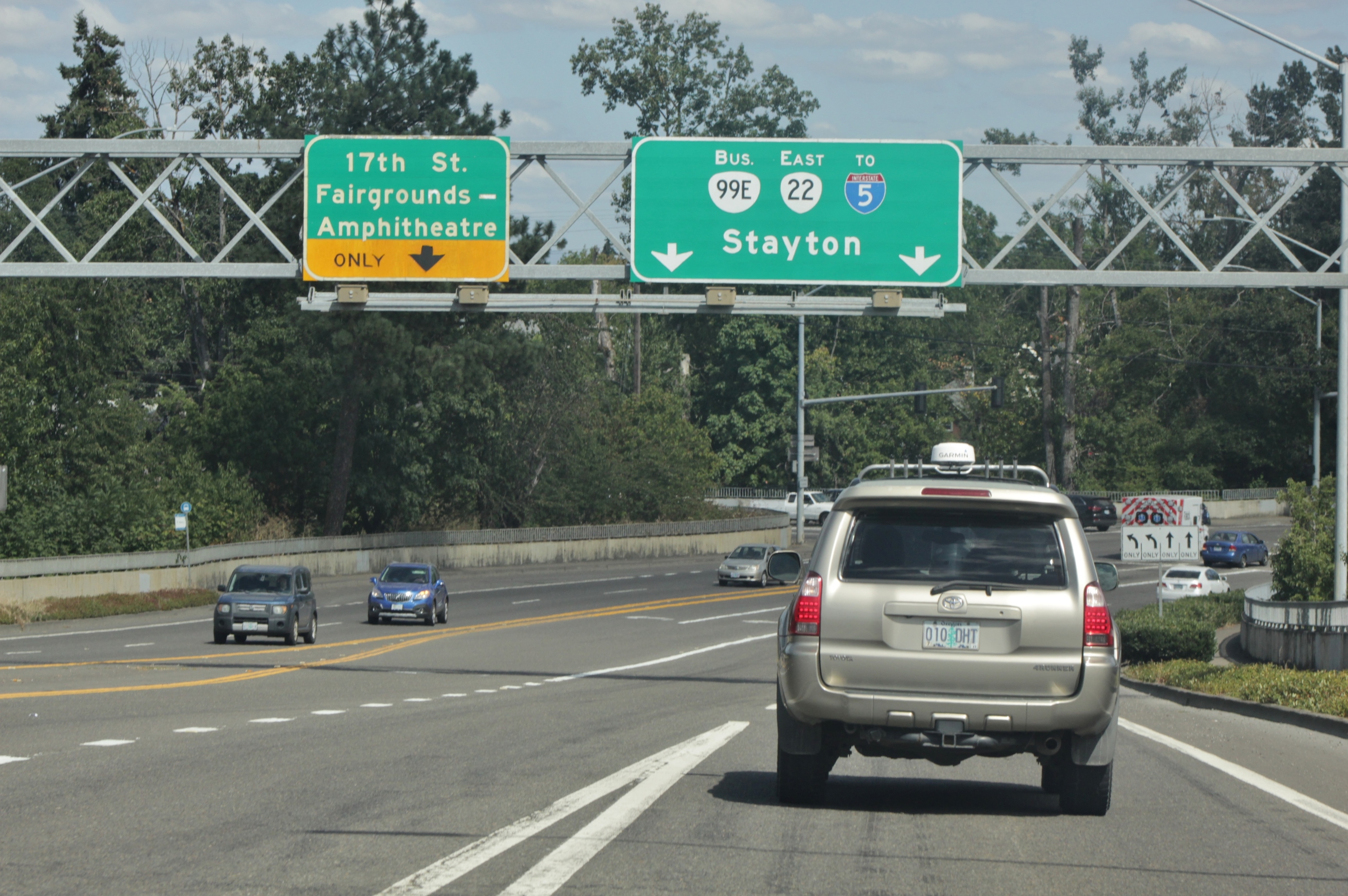
OR 99E and OR 22 in southeastern Salem

The northern end of OR 99E business is at an intersection with OR 99E north of the Salem area. It runs west for approximately 1 mile (1.6 km) along Salem-maintained Chemawa Road to an interchange with I-5 and Dr. Martin Luther King, Jr. Parkway (designated by ODOT as Salem Highway #72 and formerly named Salem Parkway) near Keizer. The highway then runs southwest along the parkway for approximately 3 miles (4.8 km), then turns south along the Commercial Street/Liberty Street couplet for another 2 miles (3.2 km). In downtown Salem, the highway skirts downtown along Front Street, where it interchanges with and shares an alignment with Oregon Route 22. OR 22/OR 99E then leave downtown via Pringle Parkway, skirting the southern edge of the Willamette University campus, then, via a pair of ramps, interchange with Mission Street. The highways then head southeast for 2.4 miles (3.9 km) until an interchange with I-5 and OR 99E. This interchange marks the end of OR 99E Business; OR 22 continues to the east along North Santiam Highway.

== History ==
Interstate 305
- Location: Salem, Oregon

The section which is now Dr Martin Luther King Jr. Parkway was originally planned to be a freeway (Salem Freeway #65), which was to be signed as Interstate 305. After originally being conceived only as a four-mile (6 km) spur of I-5 into downtown Salem, the I-305 project was modified and expanded by about 2.34 miles (3.77 km) to include a new bridge across the Willamette River to meet OR 22, providing increased access to Polk County. It was designated as Salem Freeway Highway No. 65 by the state government in 1968. Local opposition cancelled the freeway in 1976 and the state government requested its withdrawal from the Interstate System in 1977. Despite the cancellation of I-305, the parkway was later built as an undivided expressway. It was renamed by the Salem City Council from Salem Parkway to Dr. Martin Luther King, Jr. Parkway (signed as Dr. MLK Jr Pkwy) in 2022.

The original alignment of OR 99E through Salem came from the south off I-5 onto Commercial Street and left to the north on Portland Road to cross I-5. In May 1986, due to Salem Parkway opening north of downtown, OR 99E was rerouted onto I-5 around Salem, and its old route south of downtown, along with the Salem Parkway and Chemawa Road north of downtown, became OR 99E Business. In March 1992, OR 99E Business was moved onto OR 22 southeast from downtown.

A section of OR 219 served part of this corridor, traveling on Broadway and River Road, until it was truncated.

== Future ==
The Oregon Department of Transportation (ODOT) and the City of Salem are considering building an additional bridge across the Willamette River, north of the current Marion and Center Street bridges (which carry OR 22 across the river, and are the only river crossings for motor vehicles in the city). The exact location and alignment of this proposed new bridge and its connecting routes is presently under study, but generally, the routes being considered would connect to OR 99E Business at or near the southern end of Dr. Martin Luther King, Jr. Parkway on the river's eastern shore, and provide access to both OR 22 and OR 221 on the western side. Such a route would be similar to that proposed for I-305.

== Major intersections ==
The entire route is in Salem, Marion County.

mi	km	Destinations	Notes
0.00	0.00	I-5 / OR 99E – Portland, Eugene OR 22 east – Stayton, Detroit Lake	Southern end of OR 22 overlap
3.72– 3.80	5.99– 6.12	OR 22 west (Marion Street Bridge) / Center Street Bridge	Northern end of OR 22 overlap; no access to westbound OR 22 from southbound OR 99E Business
4.00	6.44	Commercial Street to OR 22 west / OR 221	
8.73	14.05	I-5 / Salem Parkway – Salem, Portland; Chemawa Road NE – Keizer	
9.65	15.53	OR 99E (Portland Road) – Salem, Oregon City, Portland, Eugene	
1.000 mi = 1.609 km; 1.000 km = 0.621 mi: Concurrency terminus
