= Ritner Creek Bridge =

Covered bridge in Oregon, US

- U.S. National Register of Historic Places
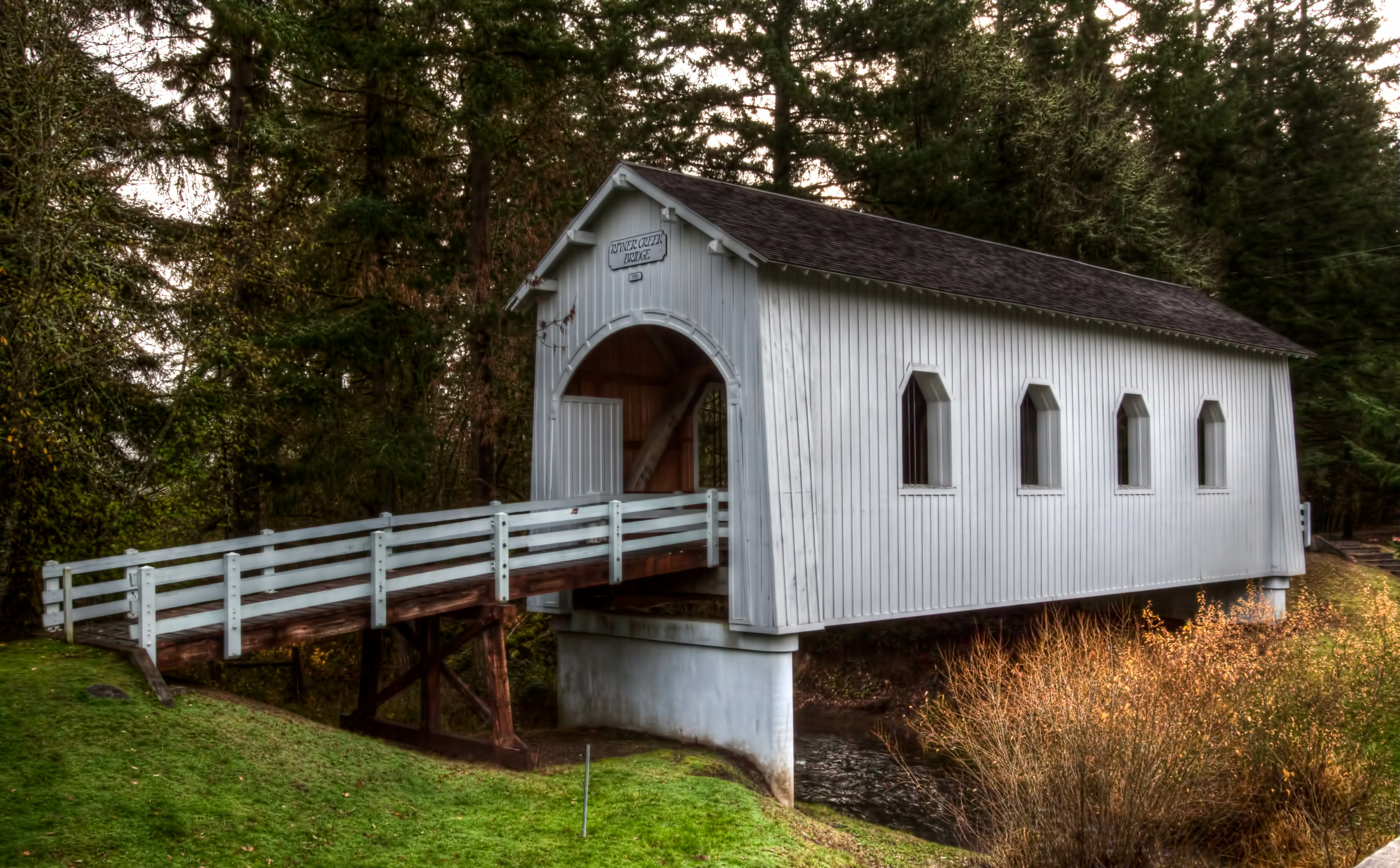
- Location: near junction of Kerber Road and Oregon Route 223, Pedee, Oregon, United States
- Coordinates: 44°43′41.33″N 123°26′30.85″W
- Built: 1927
- Architect: Charles Otis Hamar, Hamar and Curry Contractors
- NRHP reference No.: 79002147
- Added to NRHP: November 29, 1979

The Ritner Creek Bridge was the last covered bridge on a state highway in Oregon. It carried Oregon Route 223 (OR 223) over Ritner Creek between Pedee and Kings Valley, about 15 miles (24 km) south of Dallas, or 10 miles (16 km) north of the junction with U.S. Route 20 (US 20) in Wren. Built in 1927, in 1976 the bridge was lifted from its foundation and relocated just downstream of its original site and replaced by a concrete bridge. The bridge was constructed in 1927 by Hamer and Curry Contractors to Oregon State Highway Commission plans. The initial construction cost was $6,964. The original portal design was rounded at the edges but was changed to a square design in the early 1960s to accommodate larger loads to pass.

The 73-foot-long (22 m) bridge was named for pioneer Sebastian Ritner, who arrived in the area in 1845. In 1974 the bridge was declared structurally unsafe and scheduled for removal. Local residents started a petition to keep the bridge, which became a ballot measure in May 1974. The measure passed and it was moved, replaced by a new highway bridge. The bridge was the last of its kind to serve on a state highway in Oregon. It was added to the National Register of Historic Places in 1979, following nomination by the State Historic Preservation Office due to the fact that while nearly 450 covered bridges existed in Oregon at the time of the bridge's construction, by the mid-1970s fewer than 60 were left in the state.

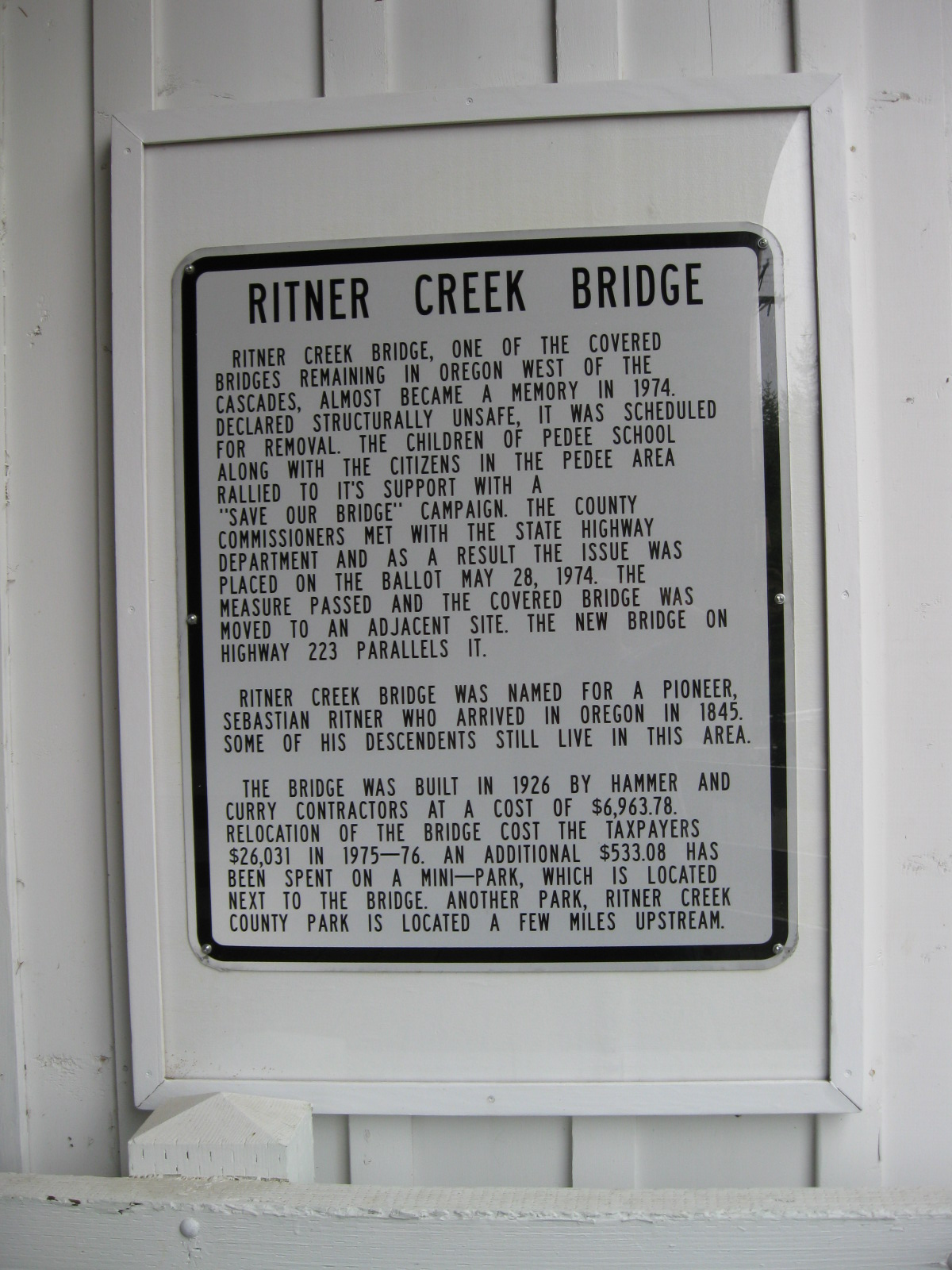
Sign detailing the history of the bridge

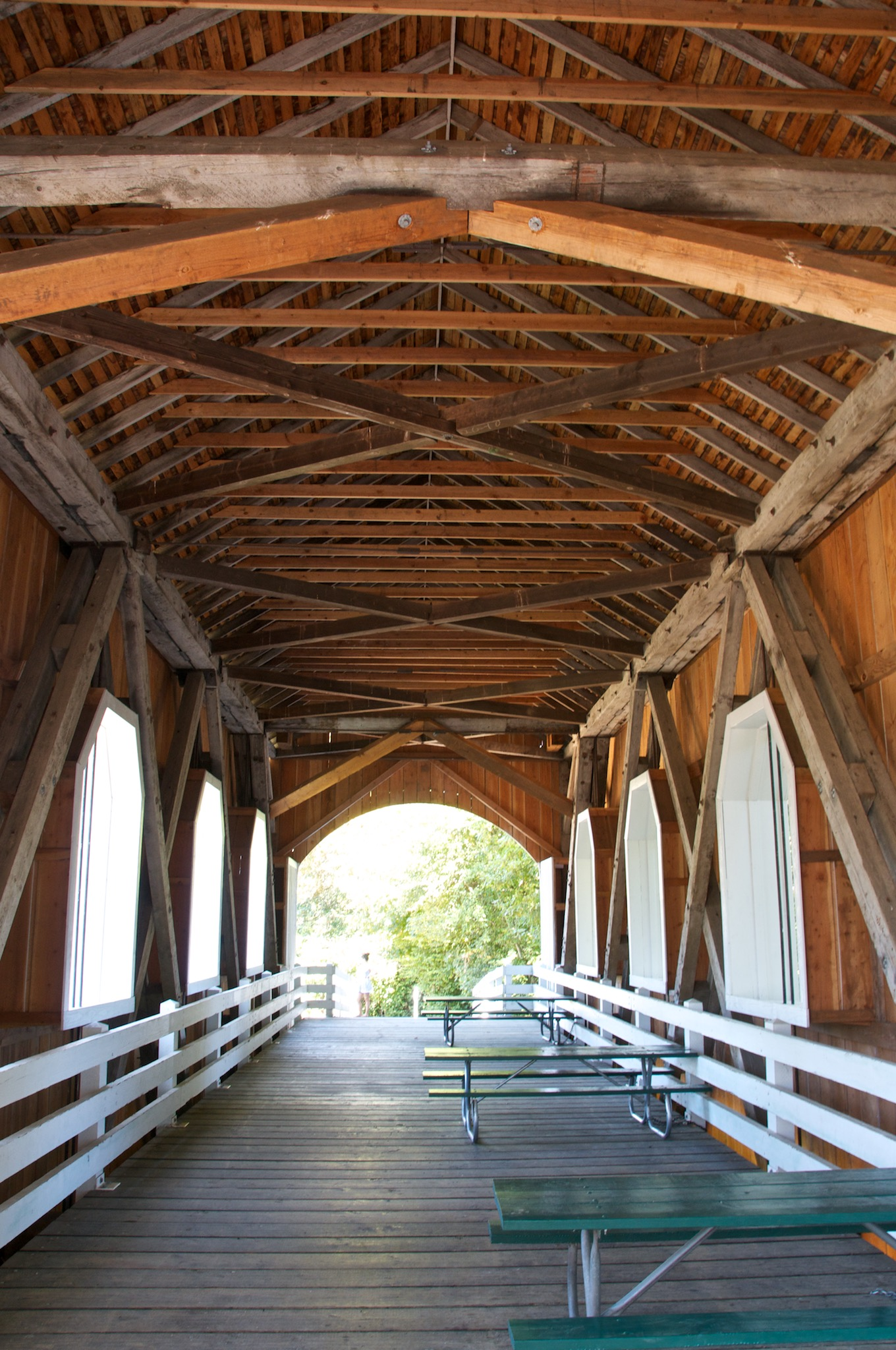
Interior of the bridge

== See also ==
- List of covered bridges in Oregon
