= Oregon Route 182 =

State highway in Lincoln County, Oregon, US

Oregon Route 182

Route information
- Maintained by ODOT
- Length: 0.75 mi (1,210 m)
- Existed: 2002–2005

Major junctions
- West end: Devils Punch Bowl State Park
- East end: US 101 near Newport

Location
- Country: United States
- State: Oregon
- County: Lincoln

Highway system
- Oregon Highways; Interstate; US; State; Named; Scenic
| ← OR 180 | → OR 194 |

Oregon Route 182 was an Oregon state highway running from Devils Punch Bowl State Park in Lincoln County to U.S. Route 101 (US 101) near Newport, Oregon. OR 182, also known as the Otter Rock Highway No. 182 (see Oregon highways and routes). was 0.75 miles (1.21 km) long and ran east–west, entirely within Lincoln County.

OR 182 was established in 2002 as part of Oregon's project to assign route numbers to highways that previously were not assigned. The Otter Rock Highway had been designated by the state government in 1947 and primarily functioned as a spur route to the state park. OR 182 was transferred from ODOT jurisdiction in 2005 and is no longer part of the Oregon state highway system, though it may be maintained as a highway class roadway by either county or local government.

== Route description ==
OR 182 began at the parking lot for Devils Punch Bowl State Natural Area, a small rock feature on the Pacific Coast in western Oregon. It traveled east along 1st Street through the unincorporated community of Otter Rock and turned northeast onto Otter Crest Loop. OR 182 then followed Otter Crest Loop to its terminus, a junction with US 101 north of Newport.

== History ==
The Otter Rock Highway was designated as a secondary state highway in 1947 and was extended in 1954 after the Oregon Coast Highway was relocated near the state park. OR 182 was assigned to the Otter Rock Highway on November 13, 2002. It was decommissioned and transferred to Lincoln County in 2005, following a repaving project completed by the state government.

== Major intersections ==
The entire route is in Lincoln County.

| Location | mi | km | Destinations | Notes |
|---|---|---|---|---|
| | 0.00 | 0.00 | Devils Punch Bowl State Park | |
| | 0.75 | 1.21 | US 101 | |
1.000 mi = 1.609 km; 1.000 km = 0.621 mi
