= Kings Valley, Oregon =

Unincorporated community in the state of Oregon, United States

Coordinates: 44°42′25″N 123°26′00″W

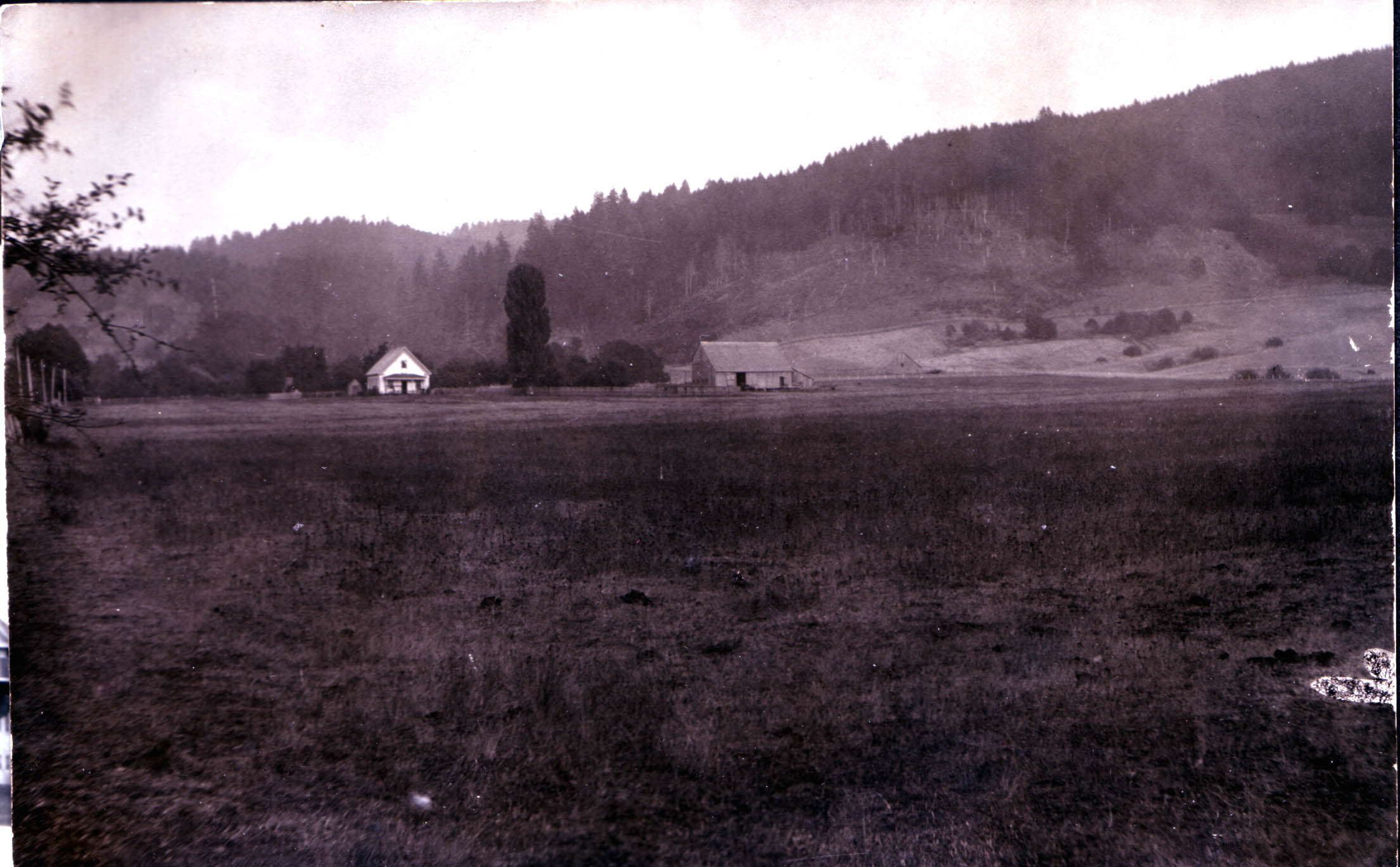
Isaac King's farm at Kings Valley

Kings Valley is an unincorporated community and census-designated place in Benton County, Oregon, United States. It is located on the Luckiamute River and Oregon Route 223, the Kings Valley Highway. As of the 2023 census population estimates it had a population of 147.

Kings Valley was named after its first settler, Nahum King, who took out a land claim there in 1846. A flour mill was built in the community in 1853. Kings Valley post office ran from 1855 to 1974.

Fort Hoskins Historic Park is nearby, in the former community of Hoskins.

The Valley and Siletz Railroad formerly ran through Kings Valley.

The K-12 Kings Valley Charter School is located in Kings Valley.

The Shrewsbury Renaissance Faire, originally located in nearby Philomath, now takes place in Kings Valley every September.

== See also ==
- Kings Valley Charter School
