= Brunks Corner, Oregon =

Unincorporated community in Oregon, United States

Coordinates: 44°55′58″N 123°08′51″W

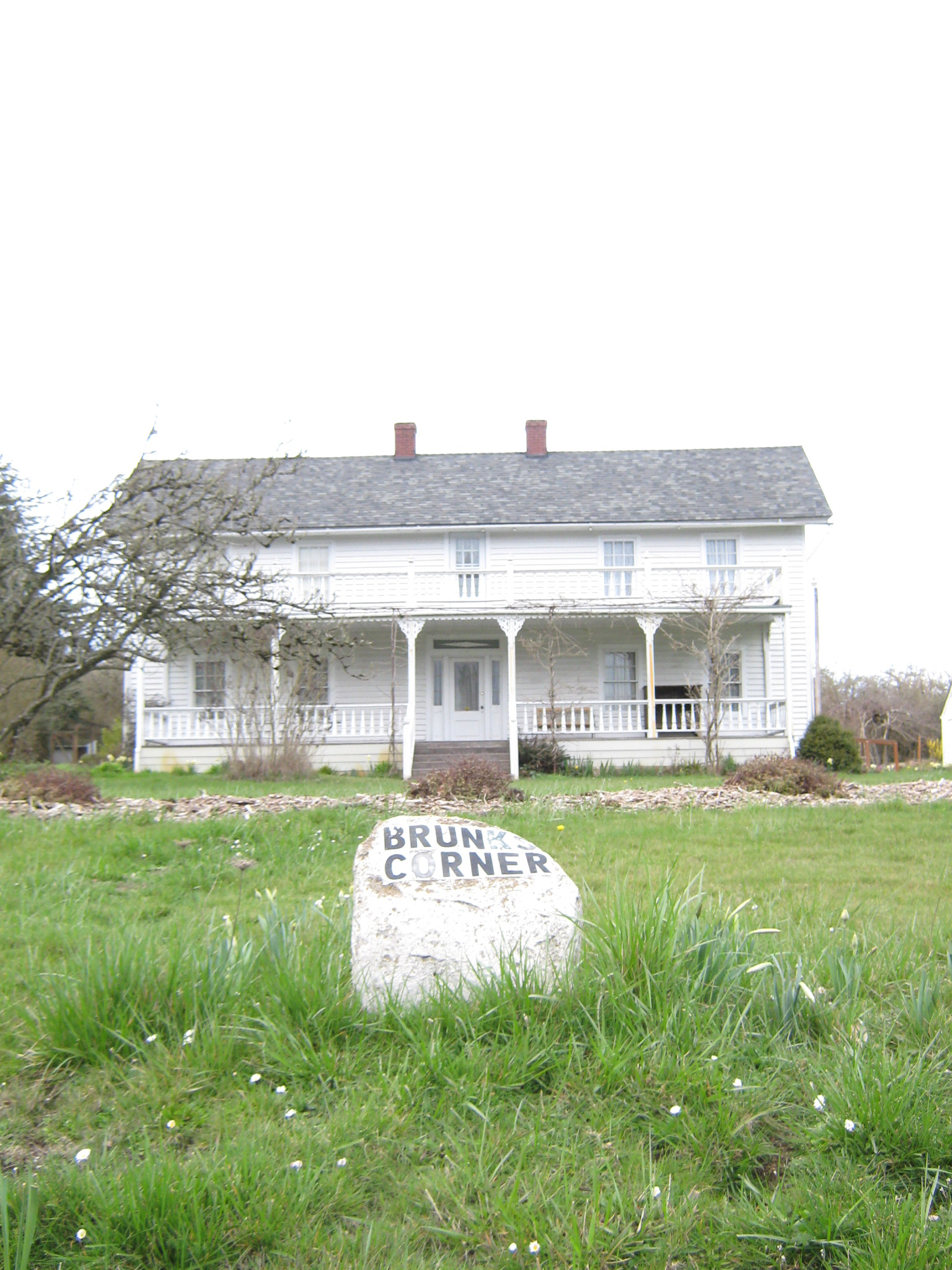
Harrison Brunk House at Brunks Corner

Brunks Corner is an unincorporated community in Polk County, Oregon, United States, at the junction of Oregon Route 22 and Oak Grove Road, near the terminus of Oregon Route 51.

The 1861 Harrison Brunk House at Brunks Corner was built by an early Oregon pioneer and is now a historic house museum run by the Polk County Historical Society. The site was designated a Century Farm in 1959. The house was listed on the National Register of Historic Places in 1975.
