= Oregon Route 22 =

State highway in western Oregon, US

Oregon Route 22
- Route 22 highlighted in red

Route information
- Maintained by ODOT
- Length: 139.01 mi (223.71 km)
- Existed: 1932–present
- Component highways: Three Rivers Highway No. 32; Salmon River Highway No. 39; Willamina–Salem Highway No. 30; Salem Highway No. 72; North Santiam Highway No. 162

Major junctions
- West end: US 101 in Hebo
- OR 18 in Valley Junction; OR 18 near Willamina; OR 99W in Rickreall; I-5 in Salem
- East end: US 20 / OR 126 in Santiam Junction

Location
- Country: United States
- State: Oregon

Highway system
- Oregon Highways; Interstate; US; State; Named; Scenic
← US 20	→ US 26

Oregon Route 22 is an Oregon state highway that runs between the Oregon Coast community of Hebo, to a junction with U.S. Route 20 near Santiam Pass in the Cascade Mountains. OR 22 traverses several highways of the Oregon state highway system, including the Three Rivers Highway No. 32, part of the Salmon River Highway No. 39, the Willamina–Salem Highway No. 30, part of the Salem Highway No. 72, and the North Santiam Highway No. 162.

== Route description ==
=== Three Rivers Highway ===
Oregon Route 22 begins (at its western terminus) at a junction with U.S. Route 101 in the coastal town of Hebo. The first section, known as the Three Rivers Highway No. 32, is a mostly scenic route; however, it is narrow and winding, and not well-suited for high-volume traffic. Little or no shoulder with an abrupt dropoff, few guardrails, no lighting, lack of adequate warning signs, and neglected paint lines in some areas, contribute to the treacherous conditions. Drivers may encounter logging trucks in the narrow two-lane road as well After passing Dolph Junction, OR 22 winds eastward though the coast range along Sourgrass Creek, a tributary of the Little Nestucca River, until it reaches the community of Grand Ronde. There, it joins with Oregon Route 18 at a location known as Valley Junction, and overlaps OR 18 along part of the Salmon River Highway No. 39 in an approximately four-mile (6.4 km) stretch between Grand Ronde and Willamina, at which point OR 22 heads southeast towards Salem, while OR 18 goes northeast towards the Portland area. The portion from Hebo to Grand Ronde was formerly signed as OR 14.

=== Willamina-Salem Highway ===
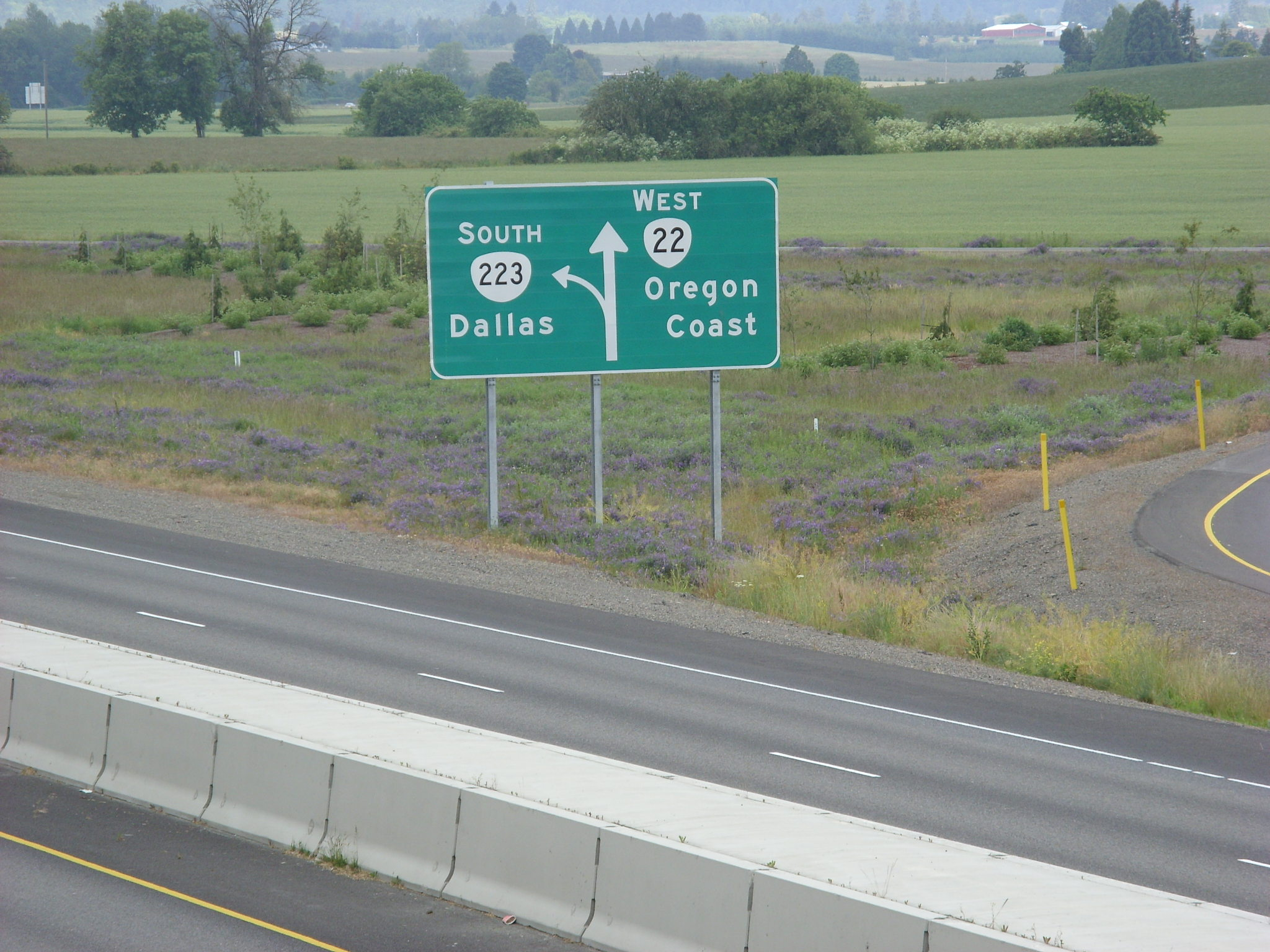
Sign at OR 22's interchange with OR 223

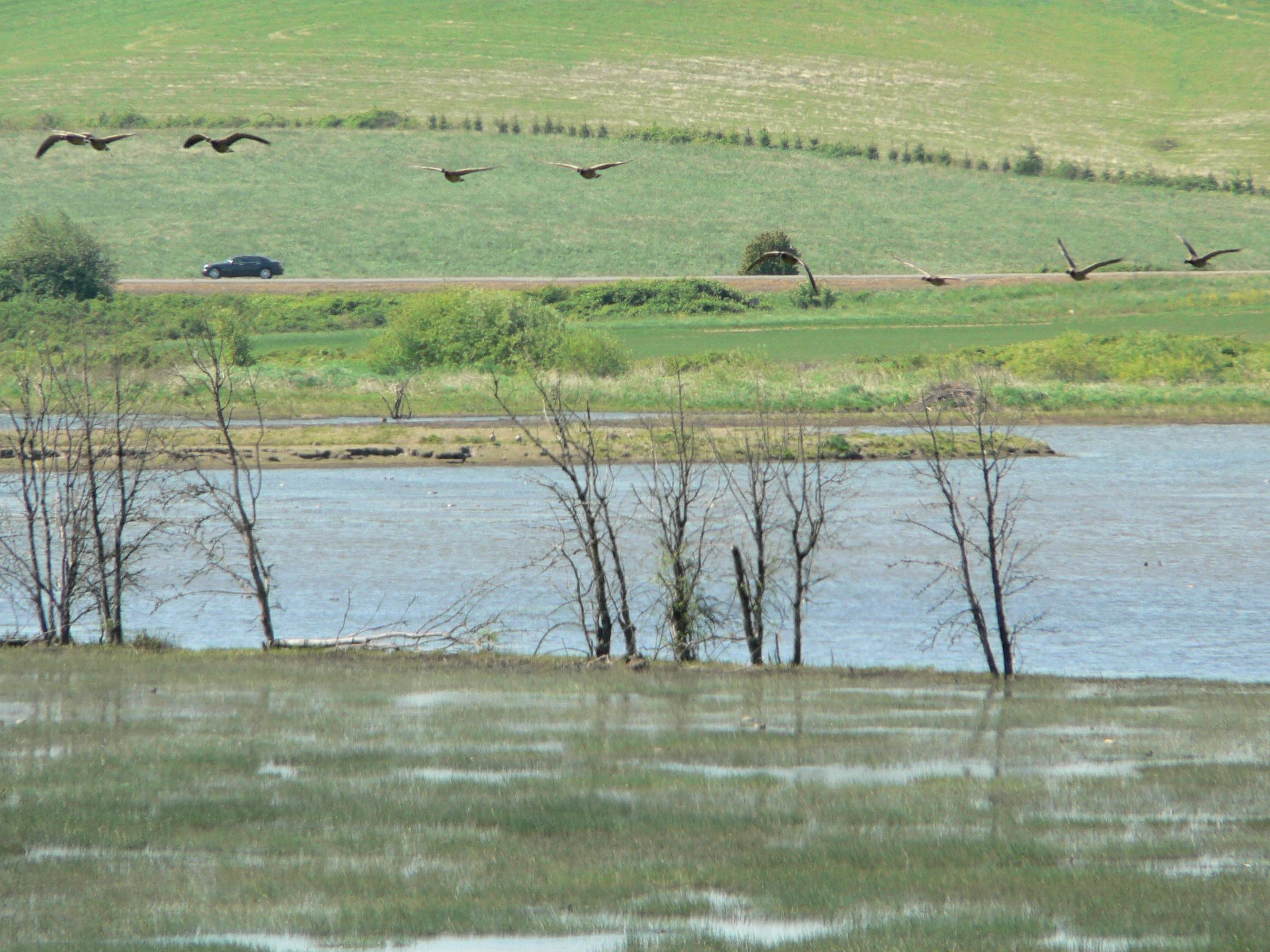
Canada Geese (Branta canadensis) flying over Baskett Slough National Wildlife Refuge with Route 22 beyond

The stretch between Willamina and Salem is known as the Willamina-Salem Highway No. 30. Between Willamina and Dallas, it is a mostly two-lane highway; unlike the stretch between Hebo and Grand Ronde, this part of OR 22 is a major freight corridor. In the Dallas/Rickreall area are intersections with Oregon Route 223 and Oregon Route 99W, along with a spur route of OR 223 further to the west. East of the OR 223 interchange, OR 22 is an expressway into Salem; there is a project being planned to upgrade much of this stretch of OR 22 to freeway standards. Between Dallas and Salem, OR 22 intersects two other highways: Oregon Route 51 and Oregon Route 221. Immediately beyond the interchange with OR 221 is the Marion Street Bridge across the Willamette River, and downtown Salem.

=== Salem area ===
After crossing the bridge, OR 22 (along with OR 99E Business, which it joins) heads south along Front Street for a few blocks, then east past Willamette University. At the eastern edge of the Willamette campus, an interchange carries the highway to Mission Street; OR 22 and OR 99E Business continue east on Mission Street (which is really an urban expressway), past the Salem airport to an interchange with Interstate 5 and Oregon Route 99E. OR 99E Business ends here; OR 22 continues to the east. This portion of OR 22 is part of the Salem Highway No. 72.

=== North Santiam Highway ===
East of the I-5 interchange, OR 22 is known as the North Santiam Highway No. 162. This section of OR 22 is a major transportation corridor; and is a primary route between Salem and the central Willamette Valley, and Central Oregon. Between I-5 and Stayton; OR 22 is a freeway: a four-lane undivided freeway between I-5 and Aumsville; a traditional divided freeway between Aumsville and Stayton, and a two-lane freeway in the Stayton/Sublimity area. The highway continues east, along the northern bank of the Santiam River, through the community of Mehama and the cities of Mill City, Gates, and Detroit. The highway passes numerous hydroelectric dams, including the ruins of an early 20th-century dam at Niagara County Park and the mid-20th century Detroit Dam which forms much-visited Detroit Lake. Beyond the Detroit on the east end of the reservoir, the highway passes Idanha, and turns south, west of Mount Jefferson, passes Marion Forks, and reaches its terminus at a junction with U.S. Route 20 and Oregon Route 126 at Santiam Junction. US 20 and OR 126 continue east over Santiam Pass into central Oregon; US 20 heads to Bend and OR 126 to Prineville (the seat of Crook County) via Redmond.

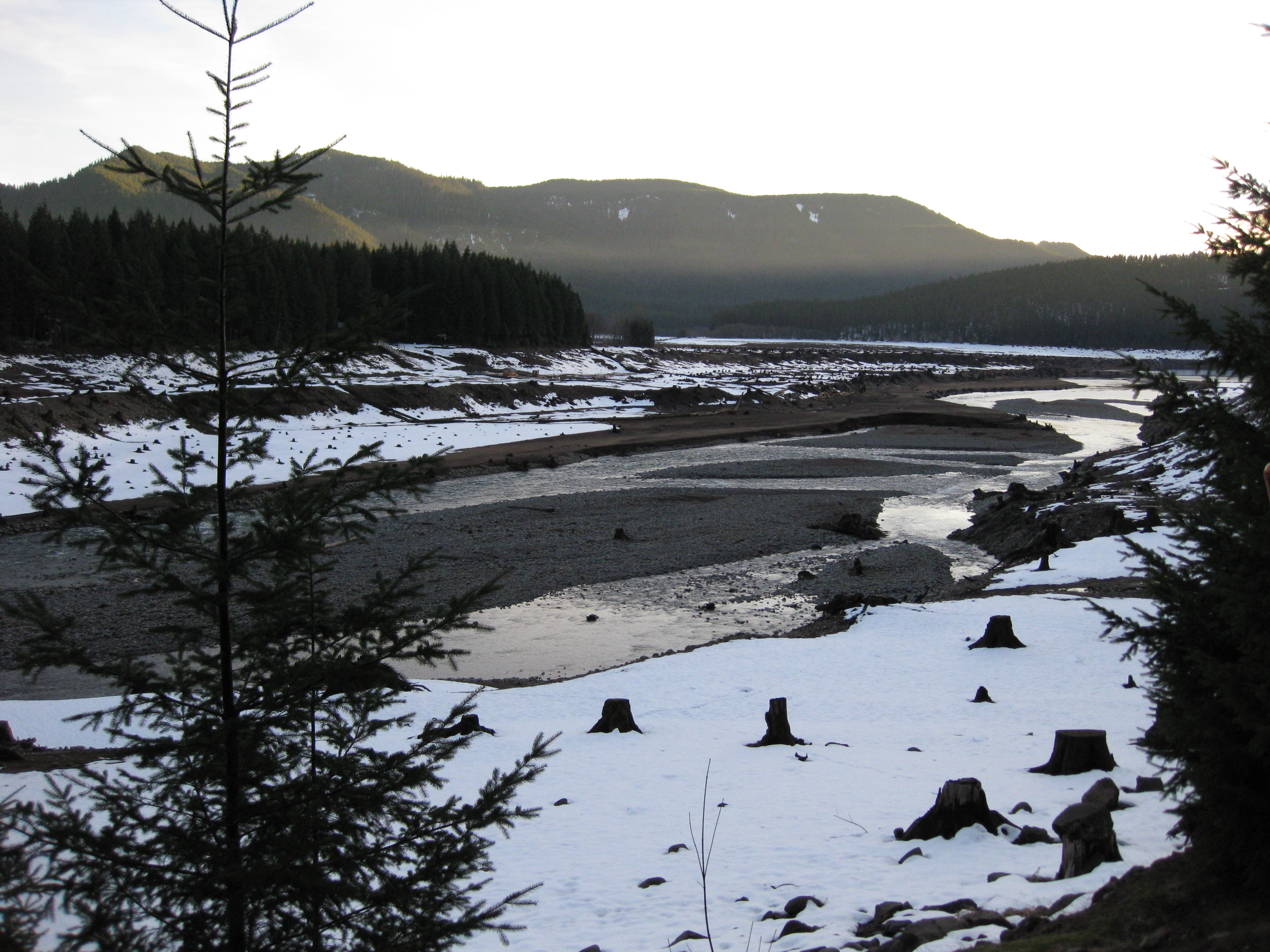
North Santiam River near Detroit as seen from OR 22

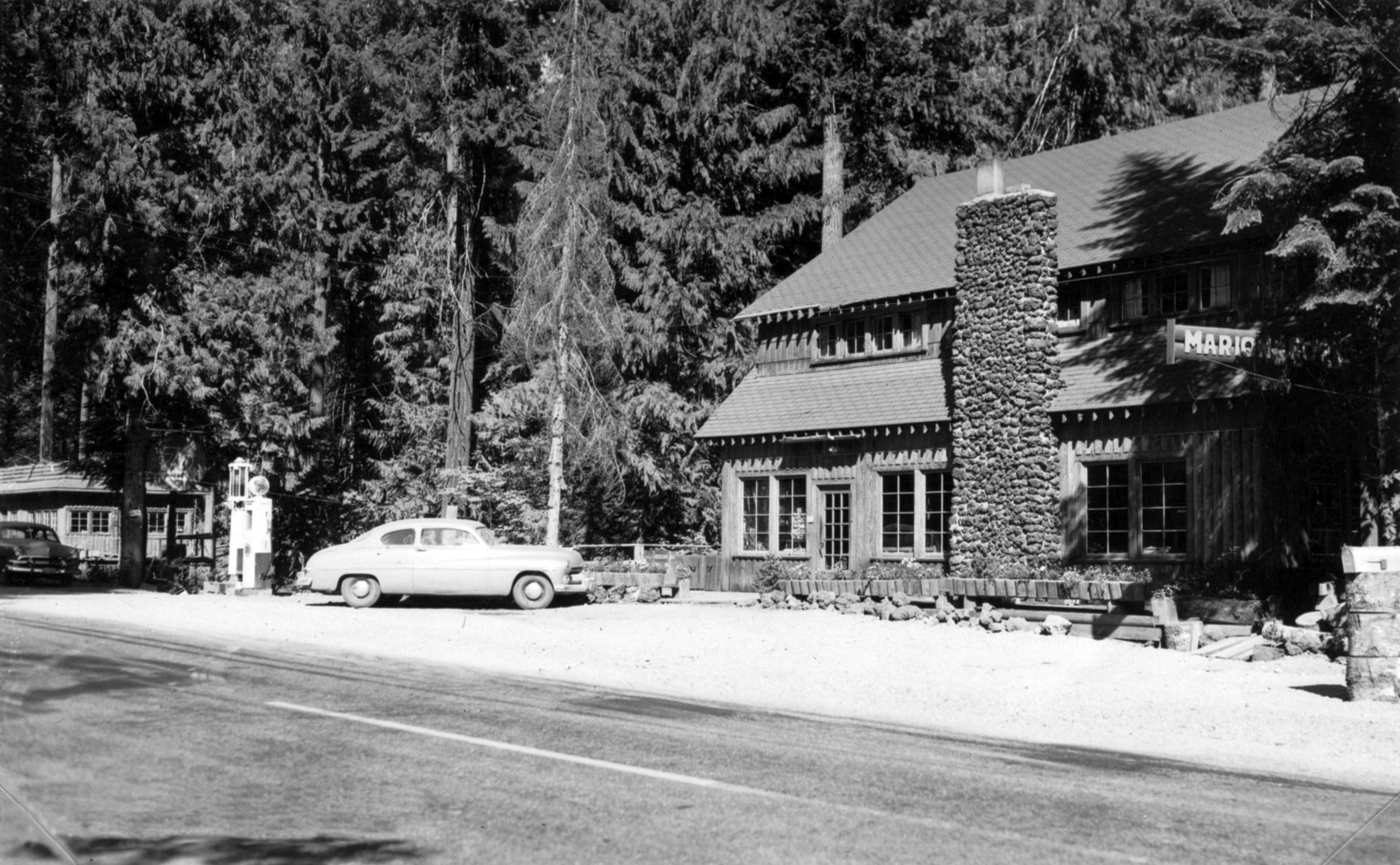
Marion Forks Lodge in Marion Forks, 1964

== Major intersections ==
Milepoints are as reported by ODOT and do not necessarily reflect current mileage. Z indicates overlapping mileage due to construction longer than established route, and – indicates negative mileage behind established beginning point. Segments that are locally maintained may be omitted. For routes traversing multiple named state highways, each milepoint is preceded by the corresponding state highway number.

County	Location	Milepoint	Exit	Destinations	Notes
Tillamook	Hebo	32 0.00		US 101 – Tillamook, Astoria, Cloverdale, Newport	
Tillamook	Dolph	32 10.63		OR 130 west – Little Nestucca River	
Yamhill	No major junctions				
Polk	Valley Junction	32 24.97 39 23.04		OR 18 west – Grand Ronde, Lincoln City	Western end of concurrency with OR 18
Polk		39 24.40– 39 24.94	25	Fort Hill Road / Yamhill River Road	Interchange
Polk		39 26.77– 39 27.00	—	OR 18 Bus. east – Willamina, Sheridan	Interchange; eastbound exit and entrance
Polk		39 27.17 30 0.00	—	OR 18 east	Interchange; eastern end of concurrency with OR 18
Polk		30 (2)0.28		OR 18 Bus. east – Willamina	Westbound exit and entrance
Polk		30 12.72		OR 223 (Kings Valley Highway) / Smithfield Road – Dallas, Kings Valley	
Polk		30 15.95– 30 16.17	—	OR 223 south – Dallas	Interchange; westbound left exit and eastbound left entrance
Polk		30 15.61– 30 16.55	16	OR 99W – Monmouth, McMinnville	Interchange
Polk	Brunks Corner	30 20.37		OR 51 – Independence	
Polk	Salem	30 24.08	Western end of freeway		
Polk	Salem	30 24.08	—	OR 221 – West Salem, Dayton	Eastbound exit and westbound entrance
Polk	Salem	30 24.91– 30 25.08	—	Rosemont Avenue – Capital Manor	Westbound exit and eastbound left entrance
Polk	Salem	30 25.74– 30 25.81	—	OR 221 north (Wallace Road) / Edgewater Street – West Salem, Dayton	Westbound exit and eastbound left entrance
Polk–Marion county line	Salem	30 25.66– 30 26.09	Center Street (eastbound) and Marion Street (westbound) bridges over the Willamette River		
Marion	Salem	30 25.97 72 5.19	—	OR 99E Bus. north to I-5 north – Keizer, Portland, Salem City Center	Left exit eastbound and westbound; left entrance eastbound; western end of concurrency with OR 99E Bus.
Marion	Salem	30 25.97 72 5.19	Eastern end of freeway		
Marion	Salem	72 6.65	—	12th Street SE / Mission Street	Interchange
Marion	Salem	72 8.48 162 1.17		OR 99E Bus. north	Eastern end of concurrency with and southern terminus of OR 99E Bus.
Marion	Salem	162 1.41	1	I-5 – Eugene, Portland	Signed as exits 1A (south) and 1B (north)
Marion	Salem	162 1.55	Western end of freeway		
Marion	Salem	162 1.91	2	Lancaster Drive – Turner	Turner only appears on eastbound signage
Marion	Salem	162 4.03	4	Gaffin Road	
Marion		162 5.44	5	Joseph Street	
Marion		162 6.67	7	OR 214 – Silver Falls State Park	
Marion		162 8.94	9	Shaw, Aumsville	
Marion		162 11.53	12	Golf Club Road	
Marion	Sublimity	162 13.23	13	Stayton, Sublimity	
Marion		162 13.80	Eastern end of freeway		
Marion	Mehama	162 22.42		OR 226 – Mehama, Lyons, Albany	
Linn		162 81.81		US 20 / OR 126 – Clear Lake, Eugene, Sisters, Bend	
1.000 mi = 1.609 km; 1.000 km = 0.621 mi: Concurrency terminus; Incomplete access
