= Harris Bridge (Wren, Oregon) =

Covered bridge in Oregon, US

- U.S. National Register of Historic Places
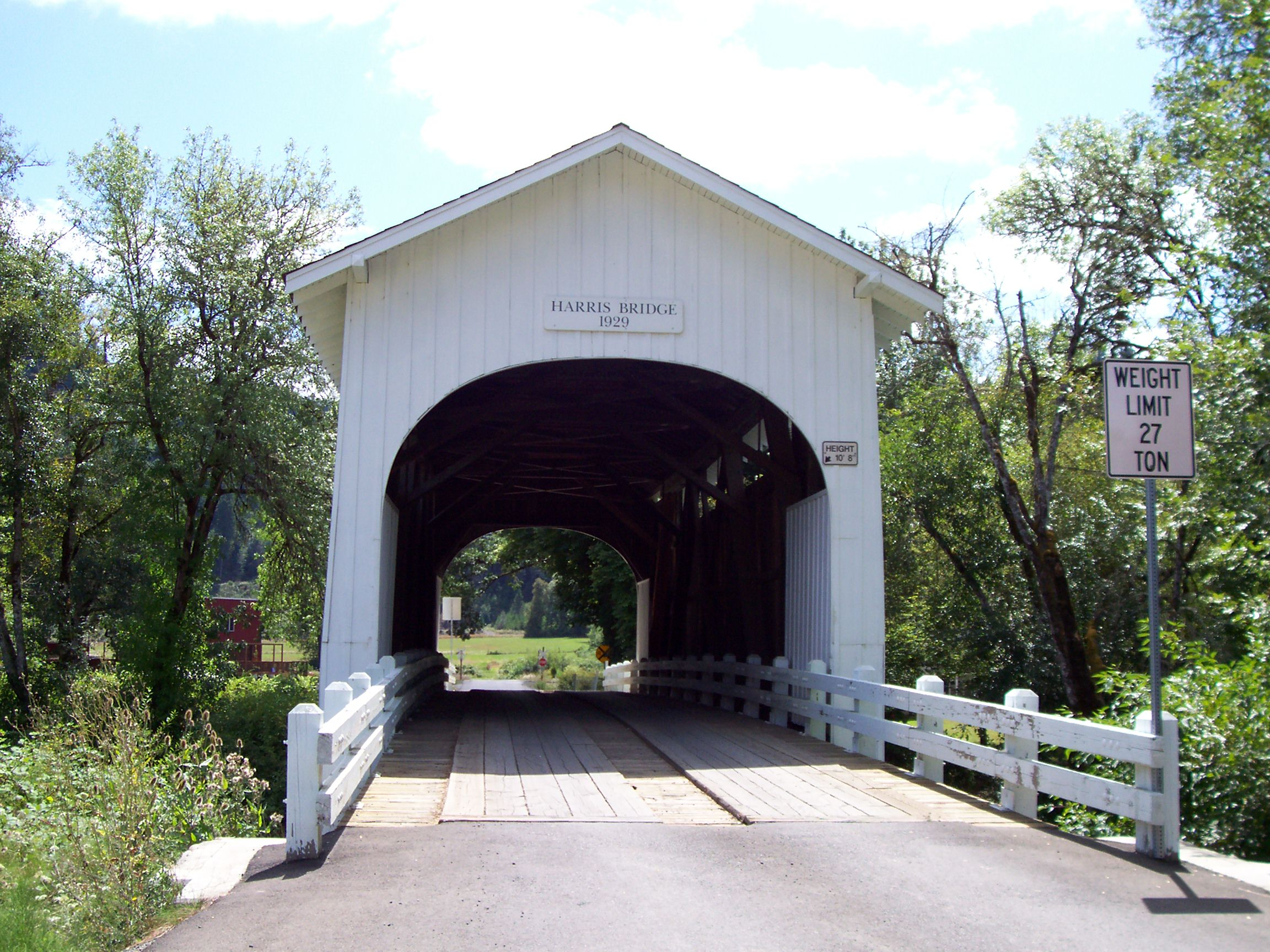
- Harris Bridge

- Location within Oregon Location within the United States
- Nearest city: Wren, Oregon
- Coordinates: 44°34′48″N 123°27′37″W
- Area: 0.1 acres (0.040 ha)
- Built: 1936
- Architectural style: Howe truss
- MPS: Oregon Covered Bridges TR
- NRHP reference No.: 79002040
- Added to NRHP: November 29, 1979

The Harris Bridge, located near Wren, Oregon, is a covered bridge listed on the National Register of Historic Places.

Harris Bridge was named for George Harris, an early settler.

== See also ==
- List of bridges on the National Register of Historic Places in Oregon
- National Register of Historic Places listings in Benton County, Oregon
