= Old West Salem City Hall =

- U.S. National Register of Historic Places
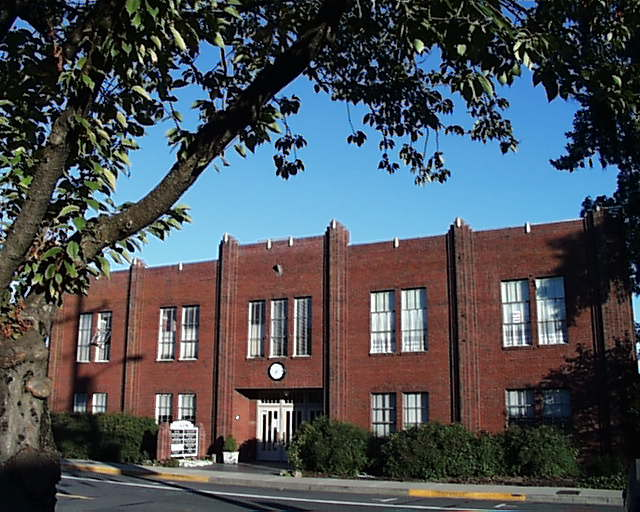

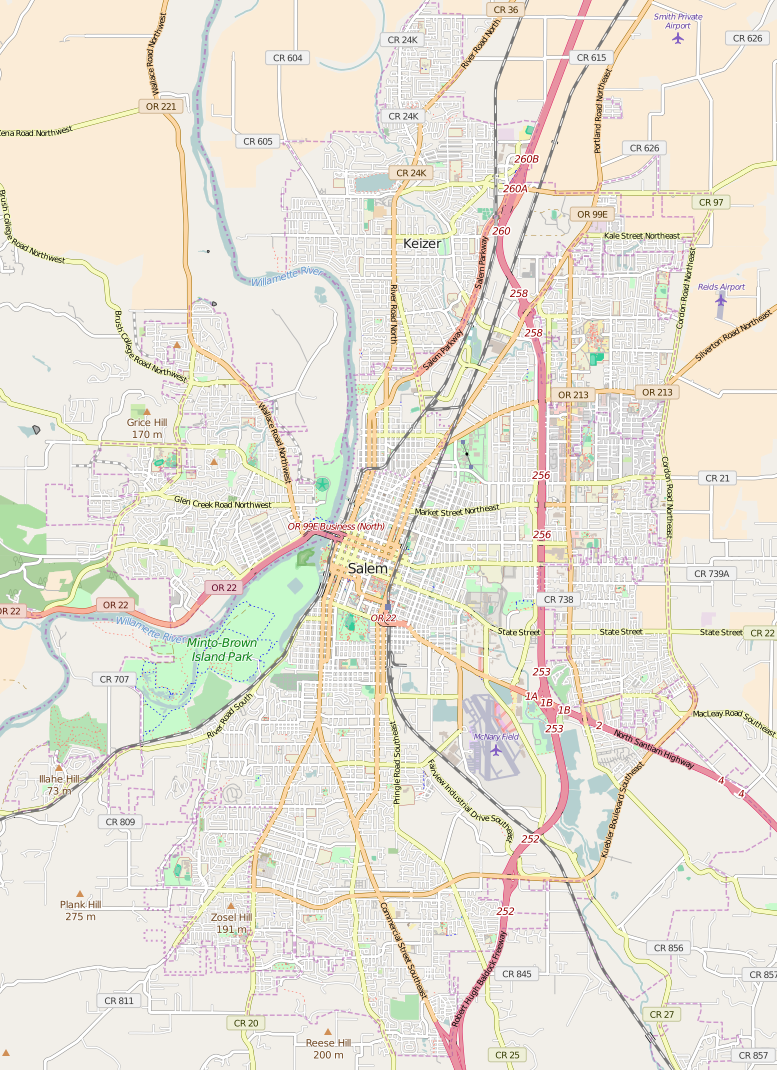
- Location within Salem OR Location within Oregon
- Location: Salem, Oregon
- Coordinates: 44°56′22″N 123°3′37″W
- Built: 1935
- Architect: Lyle P. Bartholomew and Arthur E. Horstkotte
- Architectural style: Art Deco
- NRHP reference No.: 90000841
- Added to NRHP: June 1, 1990

The Old West Salem City Hall served West Salem, Oregon, United States, as its city hall from 1935 until the city merged with Salem in 1949. It was built using WPA funds. After serving as a city hall, it was used for other Salem government functions. The West Salem Branch of the Salem Public Library was established there in 1957 and occupied the first floor until it moved out in 1987 due to the building's deterioration.

The building was restored for use as private offices and was placed on the National Register of Historic Places in 1990.
