= Oregon Route 194 =

State highway in Polk County, Oregon, US

Oregon Route 194
- Route 194 highlighted in red

Route information
- Maintained by ODOT
- Length: 7.56 mi (12.17 km)
- Existed: 2002–present

Major junctions
- West end: OR 223 near Dallas
- East end: OR 51 / OR 99W in Monmouth

Location
- Country: United States
- State: Oregon
- County: Polk

Highway system
- Oregon Highways; Interstate; US; State; Named; Scenic
| ← OR 182 | → US 197 |

Oregon Route 194 is an Oregon state highway running from OR 223 near Dallas to OR 99W and OR 51 in Monmouth. OR 194 is known as the Monmouth Highway No. 194 (see Oregon highways and routes). It is 7.56 miles (12.17 km) long and runs east–west, entirely within Polk County.

OR 194 was established in 2002 as part of Oregon's project to assign route numbers to highways that previously were not assigned, and, as of July 2018, remains unsigned. Oddly, the four ODOT bridge inventory signs along the highway list the route number as "US 51," suggesting it may eventually be signed instead as an extension of Oregon Route 51.

== Route description ==
OR 194 begins at an intersection with OR 223 approximately five miles south of Dallas. It heads east to an intersection with OR 99W and OR 51 in Monmouth, where it ends.

== History ==
OR 194 was assigned to the Monmouth Highway in 2002.

== Major intersections ==
The entire route is in Polk County.

| Location | mi | km | Destinations | Notes |
|---|---|---|---|---|
| Near Dallas | 0.00 | 0.00 | OR 223 | |
| Monmouth | 7.56 | 12.17 | OR 51 / OR 99W | |
1.000 mi = 1.609 km; 1.000 km = 0.621 mi

== Bibliography ==
- Oregon Department of Transportation, Descriptions of US and Oregon Routes, https://web.archive.org/web/20051102084300/http://www.oregon.gov/ODOT/HWY/TRAFFIC/TEOS_Publications/PDF/Descriptions_of_US_and_Oregon_Routes.pdf, page 27.
- Oregon Department of Transportation, Monmouth Highway No. 194, ftp://ftp.odot.state.or.us/tdb/trandata/maps/slchart_pdfs_1980_to_2002/Hwy194_1997.pdf
