= Wren, Oregon =

Unincorporated community in Benton County, Oregon, United States

Coordinates: 44.58778°N 123.42722°W

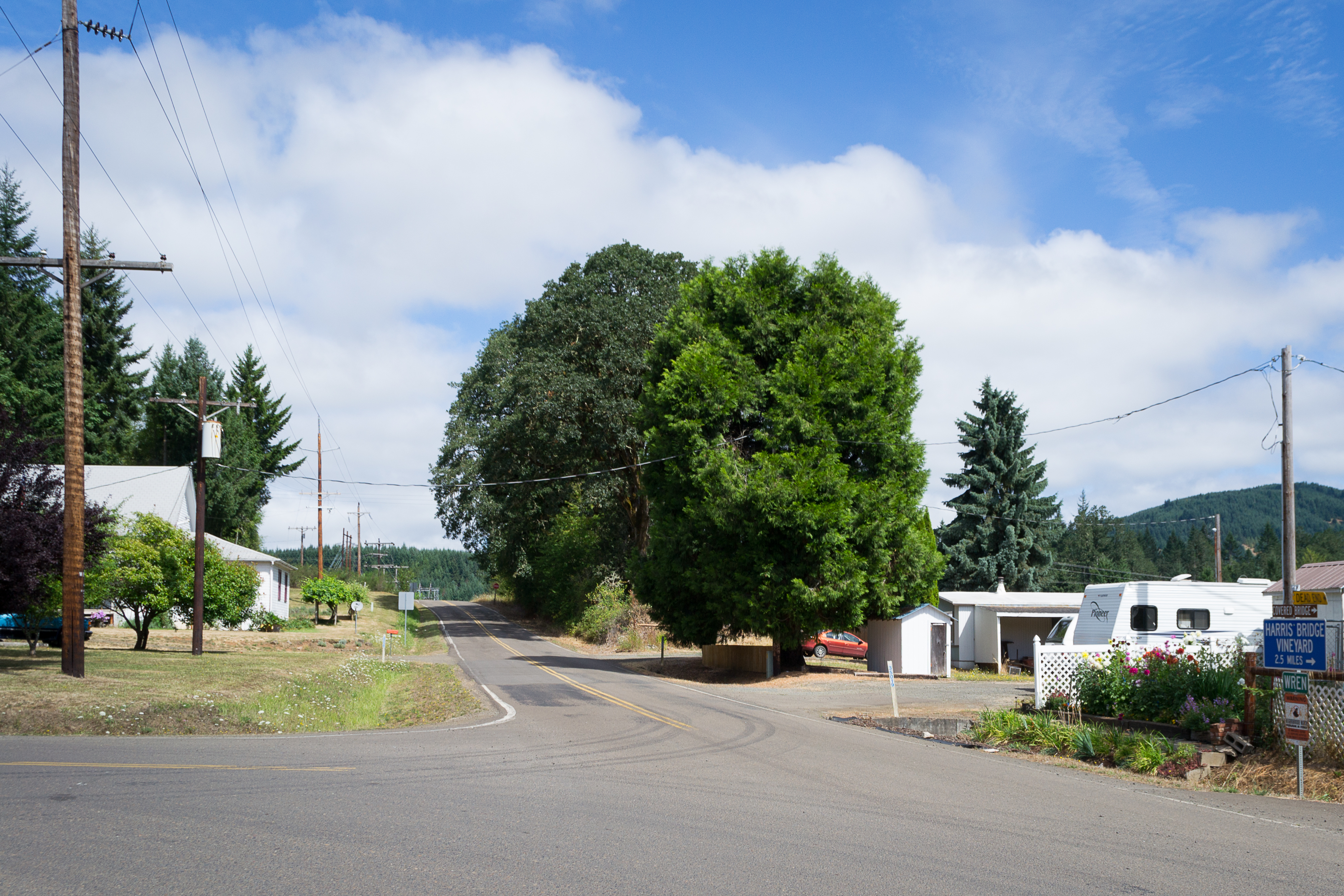
View north on Wren Road

Wren is an unincorporated community in Benton County, Oregon, United States. It is located at the junction of U.S. Route 20 and Oregon Route 223 on the Marys River.

Wren was named for George P. Wren, who settled in the area. The first form of the name was "Wrens", used for a station established by the Oregon Pacific Railroad in the locality in 1886. In 1927, Wren was described as having "a railway station, general store, post office, and church. Four families live at this point." Wren had a post office from 1887 to 1968.

== See also ==
- Harris Bridge (Wren, Oregon)
