= Aumsville, Oregon =

- City
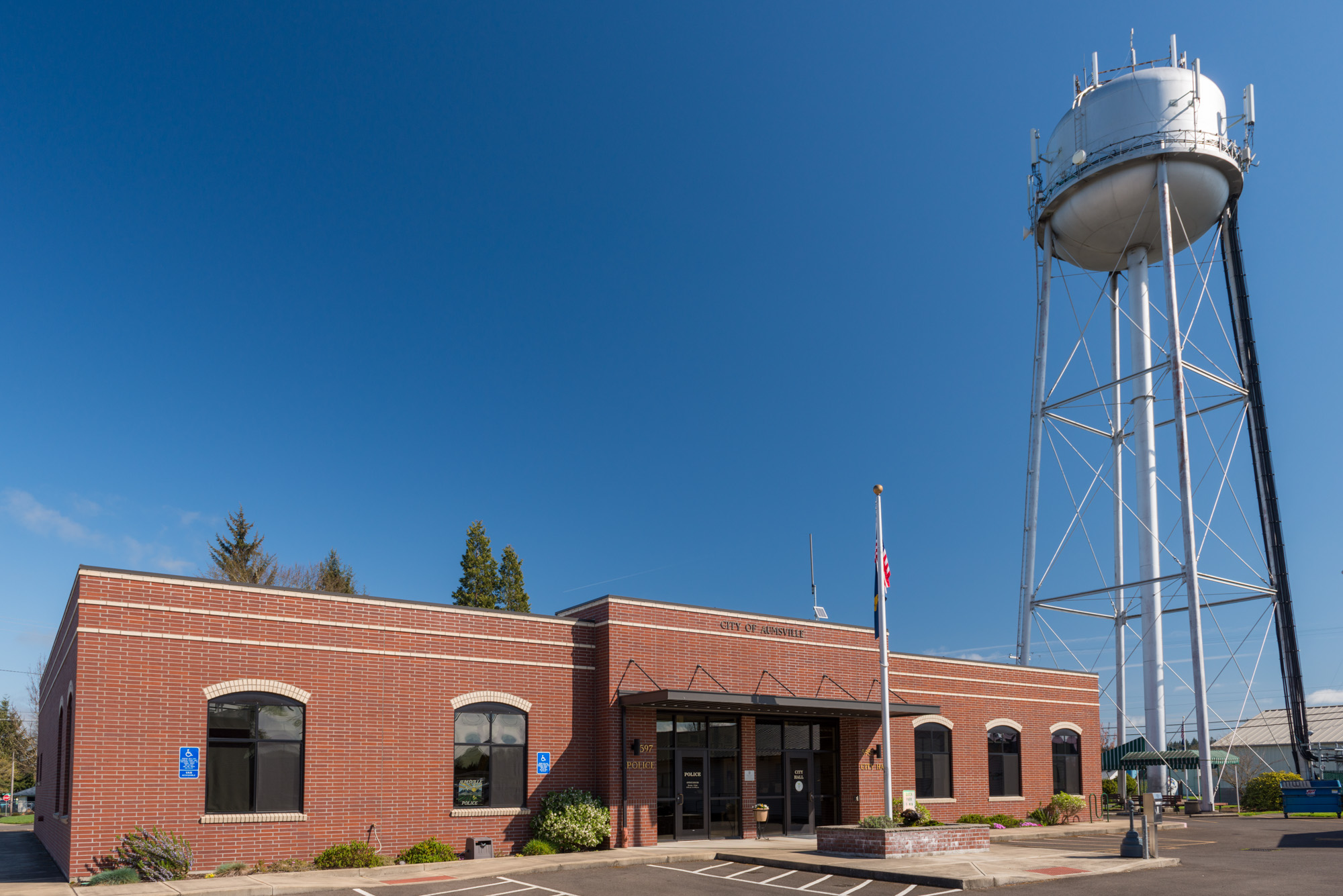
- City hall
- Motto: "Home of the Corn Festival"
- Location in Oregon
- Coordinates: 44°50′42″N 122°52′17″W
- Country: United States
- State: Oregon
- County: Marion
- Incorporated: August 3, 1911

Government
  - Mayor: Angelica Ceja

Area
  - Total: 1.13 sq mi (2.92 km^{2})
  - Land: 1.13 sq mi (2.92 km^{2})
  - Water: 0 sq mi (0.00 km^{2})
- Elevation: 361 ft (110 m)

Population (2020)
  - Total: 4,234
  - Density: 3,751/sq mi (1,448.2/km^{2})
- Time zone: UTC-8 (Pacific)
  - Summer (DST): UTC-7 (Pacific)
- ZIP Code: 97325
- Area codes: 503 and 971
- FIPS code: 41-03250
- GNIS feature ID: 2409756
- Website: www.aumsville.us

Aumsville is a city in Marion County, Oregon, United States. The population was 4,234 at the 2020 census, up from 3,584 in 2010. It is part of the Salem Metropolitan Statistical Area.

== History ==
Aumsville is on the site of the pioneer farm of Henry L. Turner, who named the settlement for his son-in-law, Amos M. Davis, more familiarly known as "Aumus", who had died on December 23, 1863. Aumsville was incorporated on August 3, 1911.

In 1893 the "Old Wooden School" was built between Main Street and Church Street, and operated until it was replaced in 1922 by Amos Davis School, which eventually closed in 1972.

On December 14, 2010, an EF2 tornado touched down in the center of Aumsville. The winds destroyed homes and caused substantial damage to businesses and City Hall.

== Geography ==
Aumsville is in southwestern Marion County, 12 miles (19 km) southeast of Salem, the county seat and state capital, and 5 miles (8 km) northwest of Stayton. Oregon Route 22, a four-lane freeway, passes along the northeastern edge of Aumsville and connects the cities.

According to the U.S. Census Bureau, Aumsville has a total area of 1.13 square miles (2.93 km^{2}), all land. Mill Creek forms the southern border of the city and flows northwest to the Willamette River in Salem. Beaver Creek, a tributary of Mill Creek, crosses the northern end of the city.

== Demographics ==
Historical population
Census	Pop.	Note	%±
1920	171		—
1930	153		−10.5%
1950	281		—
1960	300		6.8%
1970	590		96.7%
1980	1,432		142.7%
1990	1,650		15.2%
2000	3,003		82.0%
2010	3,584		19.3%
2020	4,234		18.1%
U.S. Decennial Census

=== 2020 census ===
As of the 2020 census, Aumsville had a population of 4,234. The median age was 33.8 years. 29.2% of residents were under the age of 18 and 10.9% were 65 years of age or older. For every 100 females there were 90.9 males, and for every 100 females age 18 and over there were 88.1 males age 18 and over.

99.9% of residents lived in urban areas, while 0.1% lived in rural areas.

There were 1,408 households in Aumsville, of which 44.8% had children under the age of 18 living in them. Of all households, 50.9% were married-couple households, 12.9% were households with a male householder and no spouse or partner present, and 26.6% were households with a female householder and no spouse or partner present. About 16.1% of all households were made up of individuals and 7.1% had someone living alone who was 65 years of age or older.

There were 1,451 housing units, of which 3.0% were vacant. Among occupied housing units, 75.5% were owner-occupied and 24.5% were renter-occupied. The homeowner vacancy rate was 1.2% and the rental vacancy rate was 2.5%.

Racial composition as of the 2020 census
Race	Number	Percent
White	3,404	80.4%
Black or African American	17	0.4%
American Indian and Alaska Native	78	1.8%
Asian	24	0.6%
Native Hawaiian and Other Pacific Islander	19	0.4%
Some other race	293	6.9%
Two or more races	399	9.4%
Hispanic or Latino (of any race)	618	14.6%

=== 2010 census ===
As of the census of 2010, there were 3,584 people, 1,182 households, and 937 families living in the city. The population density was 3,513.7 inhabitants per square mile (1,356.6/km^{2}). There were 1,231 housing units at an average density of 1,206.9 per square mile (466.0/km^{2}). The racial makeup of the city was 84.3% White, 0.5% African American, 2.2% Native American, 0.6% Asian, 0.3% Pacific Islander, 6.7% from other races, and 5.4% from two or more races. Hispanic or Latino of any race were 14.4% of the population.

There were 1,182 households, of which 49.5% had children under the age of 18 living with them, 53.4% were married couples living together, 20.7% had a female householder with no husband present, 5.2% had a male householder with no wife present, and 20.7% were non-families. 16.3% of all households were made up of individuals, and 5.6% had someone living alone who was 65 years of age or older. The average household size was 3.03 and the average family size was 3.33.

The median age in the city was 30.4 years. 34.3% of residents were under the age of 18; 8% were between the ages of 18 and 24; 28.2% were from 25 to 44; 21.1% were from 45 to 64; and 8.4% were 65 years of age or older. The gender makeup of the city was 47.2% male and 52.8% female.

=== 2000 census ===
As of the census of 2000, there were 3,003 people, 961 households, and 803 families living in the city. The population density was 3,792.5 inhabitants per square mile (1,464.3/km^{2}). There were 1,024 housing units at an average density of 1,293.2 per square mile (499.3/km^{2}). The racial makeup of the city was 86.75% White, 1.83% Native American, 0.47% Asian, 0.30% African American, 0.17% Pacific Islander, 6.06% from other races, and 4.43% from two or more races. Hispanic or Latino of any race were 11.39% of the population.

There were 961 households, out of which 52.9% had children under the age of 18 living with them, 61.3% were married couples living together, 17.8% had a female householder with no husband present, and 16.4% were non-families. 12.6% of all households were made up of individuals, and 4.3% had someone living alone who was 65 years of age or older. The average household size was 3.12 and the average family size was 3.37.

In the city, the population was spread out, with 36.4% under the age of 18, 8.5% from 18 to 24, 31.8% from 25 to 44, 17.4% from 45 to 64, and 5.9% who were 65 years of age or older. The median age was 28 years. For every 100 females, there were 92.1 males. For every 100 females age 18 and over, there were 88.2 males.

The median income for a household in the city was $40,704, and the median income for a family was $41,316. Males had a median income of $32,723 versus $24,514 for females. The per capita income for the city was $14,262. About 13.8% of families and 15.8% of the population were below the poverty line, including 23.7% of those under age 18 and 11.1% of those age 65 or over.

== Annual cultural events ==
The Aumsville Corn Festival is held in August.

== Parks and recreation ==
Aumsville is home to the Brian Haney Memorial Skate Park.
