= West Salem, Salem, Oregon =

West Salem, Oregon
- Neighborhood
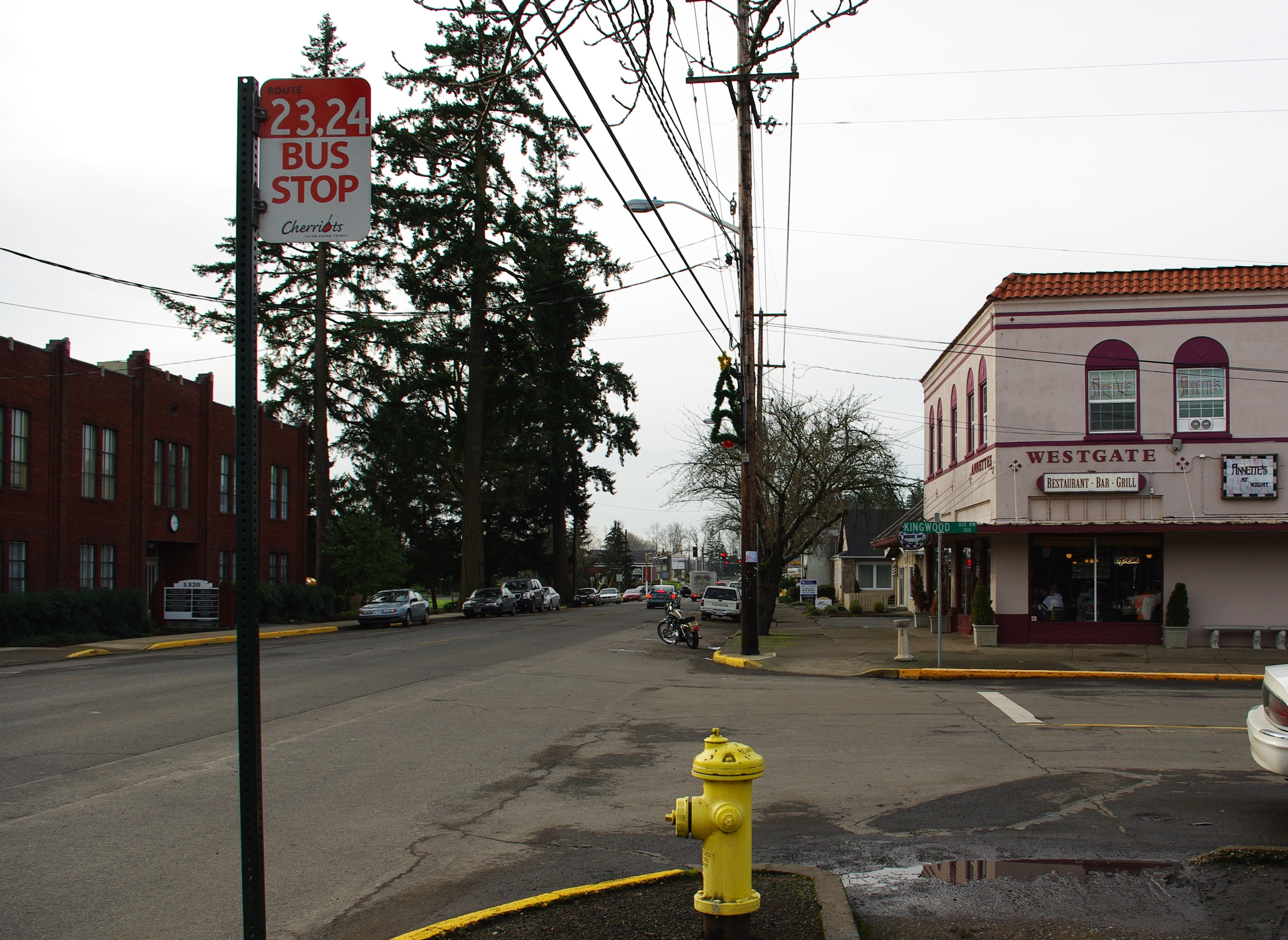
- Old commercial district on Edgewater Street
- Interactive map of West Salem, Oregon
- Coordinates: 44°56′20″N 123°03′39″W
- Country: United States
- State: Oregon
- County: Polk County
- City: Salem
- Elevation: 144 ft (44 m)

Population (2020)
  - Total: 34,148
- Time zone: Pacific
- ZIP code: 97304
- Area codes: 503 and 971
- GNIS feature ID: 1163343

West Salem is a neighborhood in Salem, Oregon, United States, located in the far northwest part of the city. West Salem is the only part of the city that is located in Polk County. The neighborhood is separated from the rest of Salem by the Willamette River, which serves as West Salem's southeast border. The business districts of West Salem are located on Edgewater Street and Wallace Road. As of 2020, the portion of Salem within Polk County had a population of 34,148.

== History ==
In 1889 a plat for West Salem was filed, and the city incorporated in 1913. In 1949, the city was officially merged with Salem. West Salem post office was established in 1938 and ran until 1952. The former West Salem City Hall (now housing private offices) was placed on the National Register of Historic Places in 1990.

== Education ==
West Salem is served by the Salem-Keizer School District, which includes West Salem High School, Walker Middle School, Straub Middle School, Brush College, Myers, Harritt, Chapman Hill, and Kalapuya elementary schools. Straub Middle School and Kalapuya Elementary School opened in the fall of 2011, and were funded by the Salem-Keizer School District construction bond.

== Transportation ==
The neighborhood is connected to the rest of Salem by the Marion Street Bridge and Center Street Bridge that carry Oregon Route 22 over the Willamette River. The Union Street Railroad Bridge also crosses the Willamette, but carries pedestrians and bicycles instead of trains. Oregon 22 and Oregon Route 221 (Wallace Road) are the two state highways in West Salem.

== Distinction ==
Locals of West Salem commonly refer to their area as "West Salem" rather than just "Salem" in everyday conversation. This distinction is supported by West Salem's unique zip code, local high school, and specific weather reporting. Known for its relative affluence, West Salem has a median home price of $538,000. The area is also recognized for its modern infrastructure, with homes, schools, and roads often maintained to a higher standard of cleanliness and modernity than other parts of Salem. It is the most populous organized urban area in Polk County.
