= Marion Street Bridge =

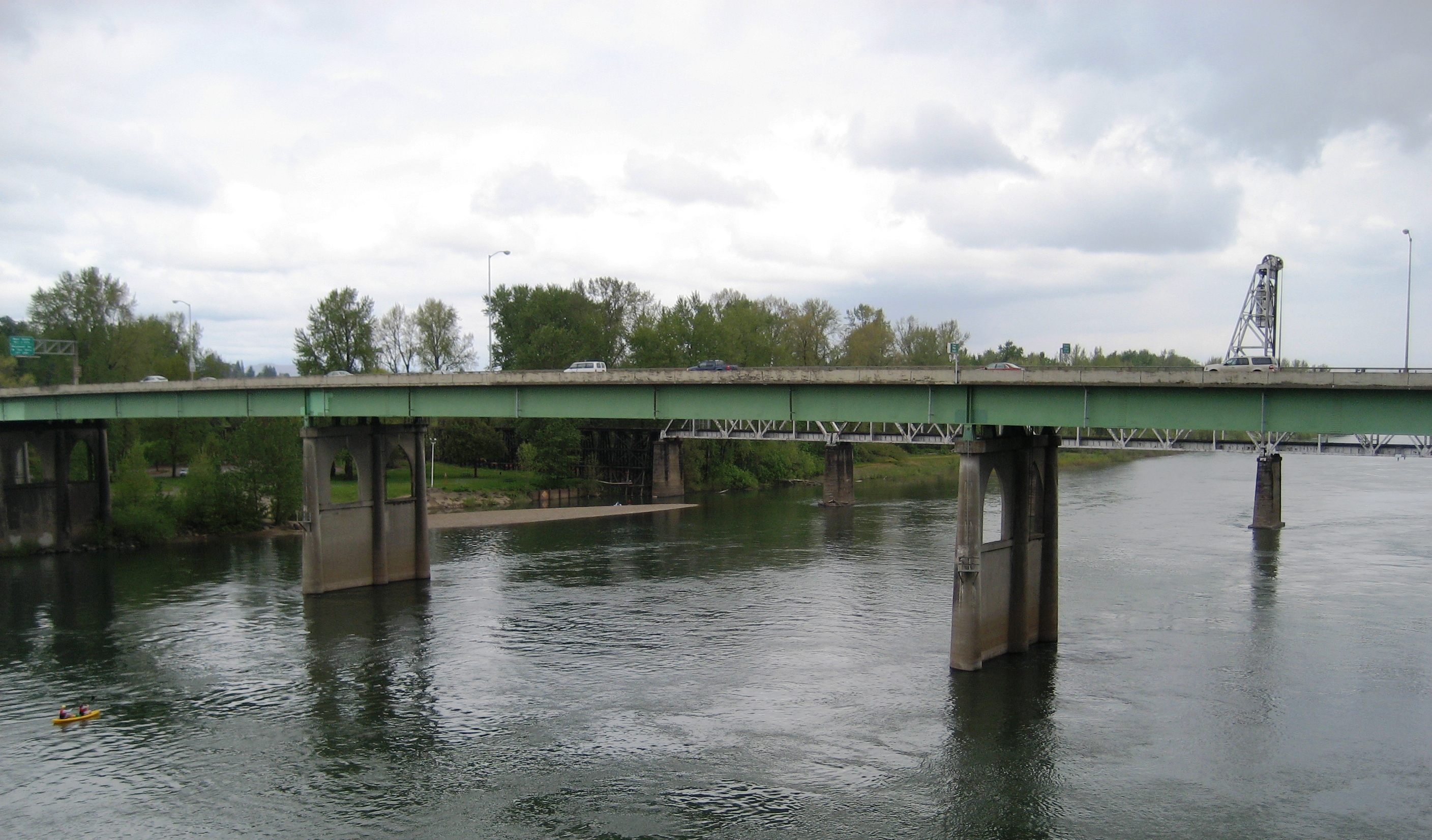
- Coordinates: 44°56′45″N 123°02′33″W
- Carries: OR 22 (Marion Street)
- Crosses: Willamette River
- Locale: Salem, Oregon
- Maintained by: Marion County

Characteristics
- Design: Plate girder

History
- Opened: 1954

Location
- Interactive map of Marion Street Bridge

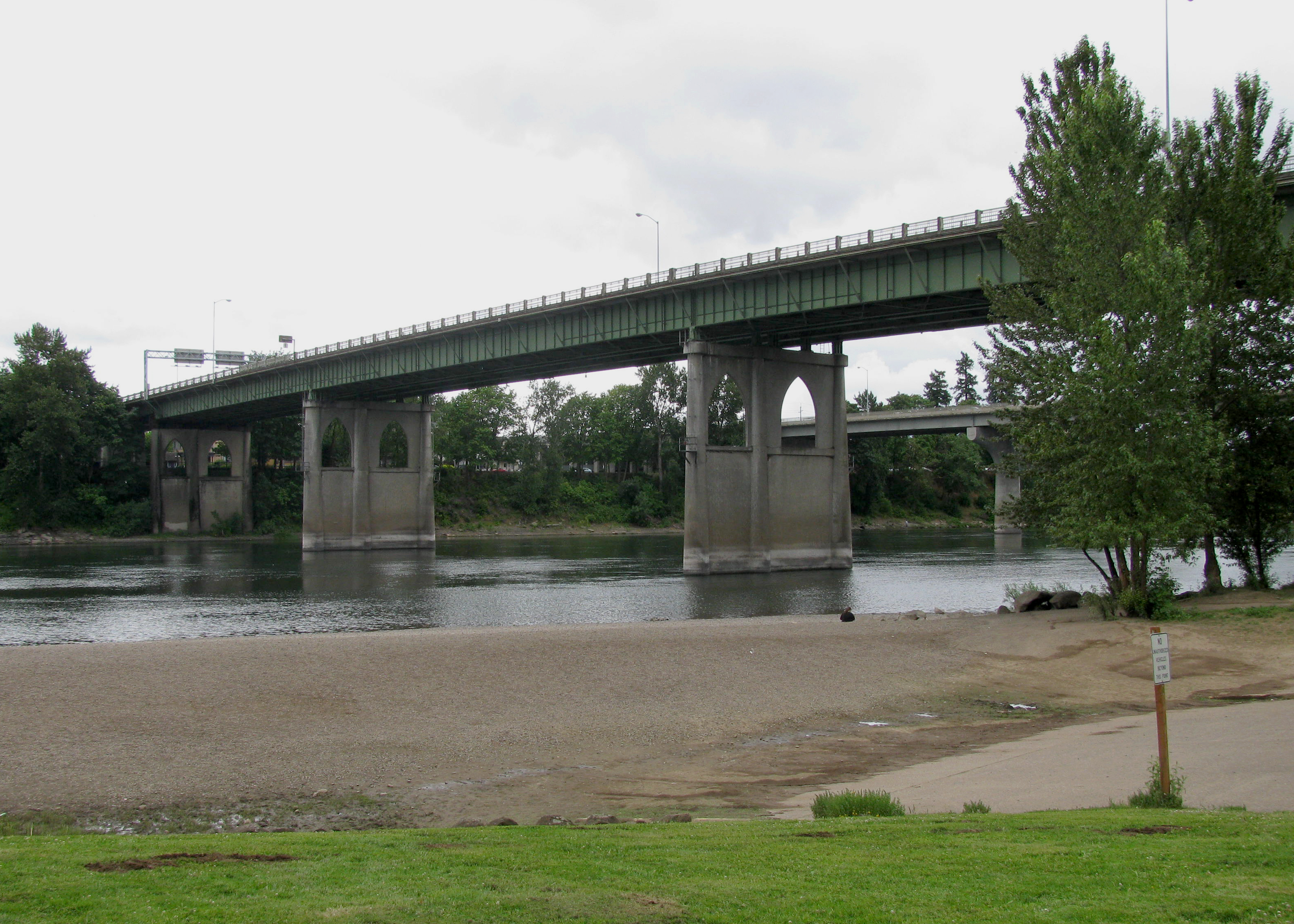
The bridge from below, 2011

The Marion Street Bridge is an automobile bridge located in Salem, Oregon, United States. It spans the Willamette River to connect Salem and West Salem, and acts as a conduit for Oregon Route 22. The bridge carries vehicular traffic one way westbound. Traffic includes two lanes that flow onto the bridge from Marion Street, vehicles turning right from Commercial Street, and traffic from a quarter-loop on-ramp from Front Street that was added in 1981. Construction began in December 1952 and the bridge opened in 1954, after taking nearly three years to complete. The bridge was built to complement the Center Street Bridge, which switched from two-way traffic to eastbound-only, later expanding to four lanes in 1982. At the time of its opening, the Marion Street Bridge was the longest bridge of its type west of the Mississippi River.

== See also ==
- List of crossings of the Willamette River
