= Bridgeport, Polk County, Oregon =

Unincorporated community in the state of Oregon, United States

Coordinates: 44°50′54″N 123°23′11″W

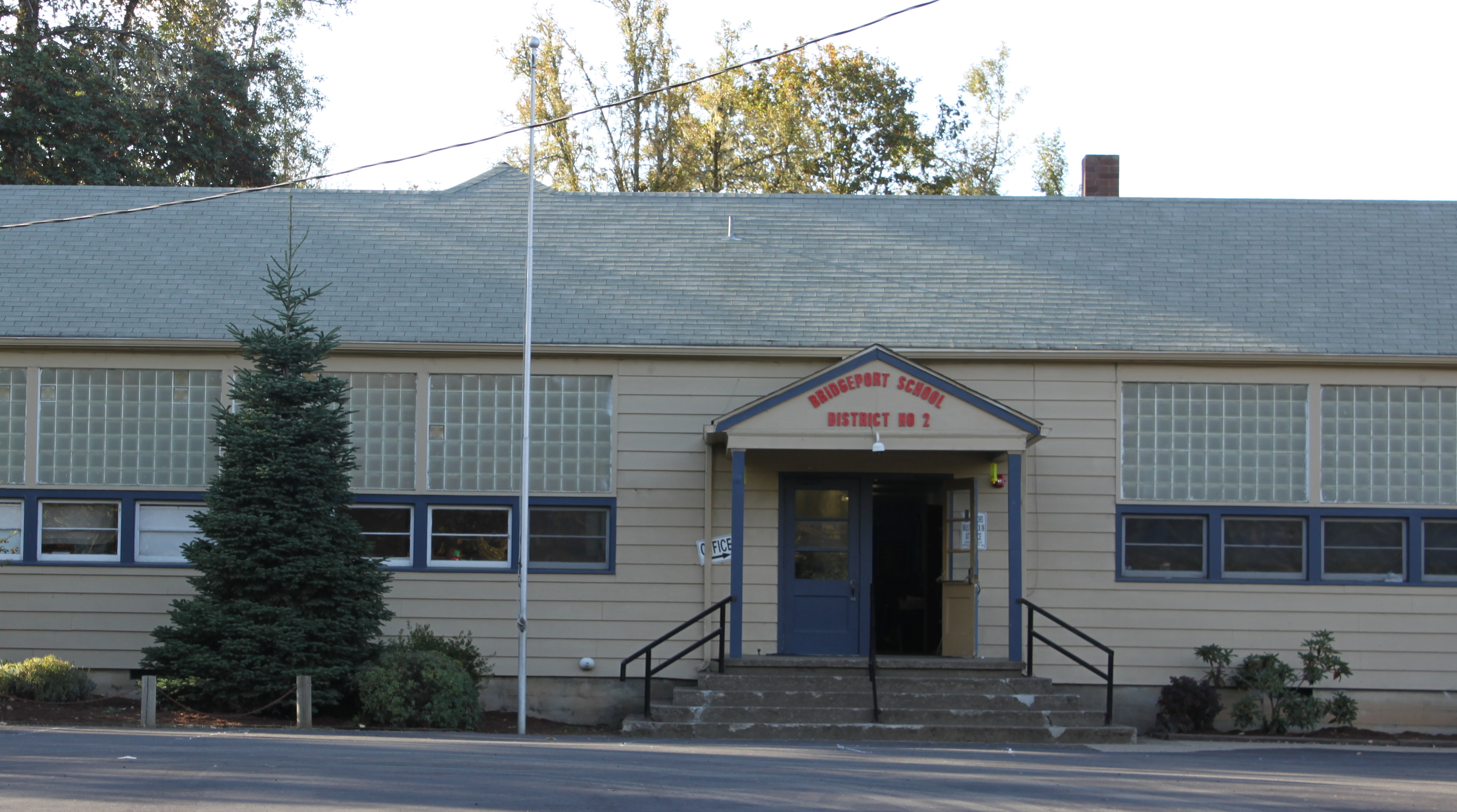
Luckiamute Valley Charter School, formerly the Bridgeport School, in Bridgeport

Bridgeport is an unincorporated community in Polk County, Oregon, United States. Bridgeport is 5 miles (8.0 km) southwest of Dallas and just west of Oregon Route 223.
