= Valley and Siletz Railroad =

Coordinates: 44.765262°N 123.429337°W

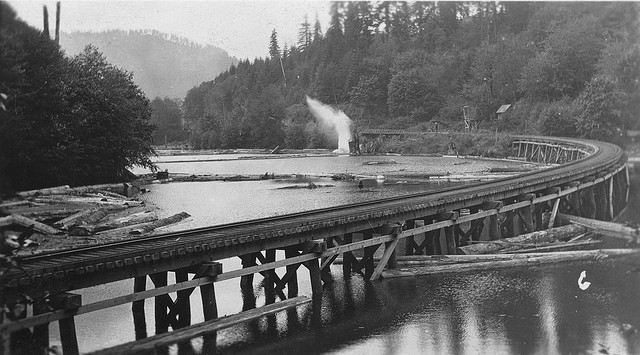
- The Valley and Siletz Railroad

Overview
- Headquarters: Hoskins, Oregon
- Locale: Polk County and Benton County, Oregon, United States
- Dates of operation: 1917–1978

Technical
- Track gauge: 1,435 mm (4 ft 8 1/2 in)
- Length: 40.6 miles (65.3 km)

The Valley and Siletz Railroad (VS) is a 40.6-mile (65.3 km) defunct railroad located in Polk and Benton counties in the U.S. state of Oregon.

The railroad began construction in 1912. It was 12 miles (19 km) long by 1915, 34 miles (55 km) long by 1917, and was extended to 40.6 miles (65.3 km) and completed later that year. In order to supply the Willamette Valley with wood products from forests in the Northern Oregon Coast Range, the railroad followed the Luckiamute River to connect Independence, a city along the Willamette River, to Valsetz, a logging community in the Coast Range whose name is a portmanteau of the railroad's name. In 1957, the railroad retired its last steam locomotive. In September 1978, when it became no longer profitable for the logging industry, most of the railroad was abandoned.

In 1985, brothers Dave and Mike Root bought the intact remnant of the Valley and Siletz line and combined it with the former Longview Portland & Northern Grand Ronde Division line to form a company called the Willamette Valley Railroad. The Valley and Siletz line was separated from the Willamette Valley Railroad in 1988. It operated until May 1992, serving the Mountain Fir Lumber Company.
