= Devils Punch Bowl State Natural Area =

Park on the central Oregon coast

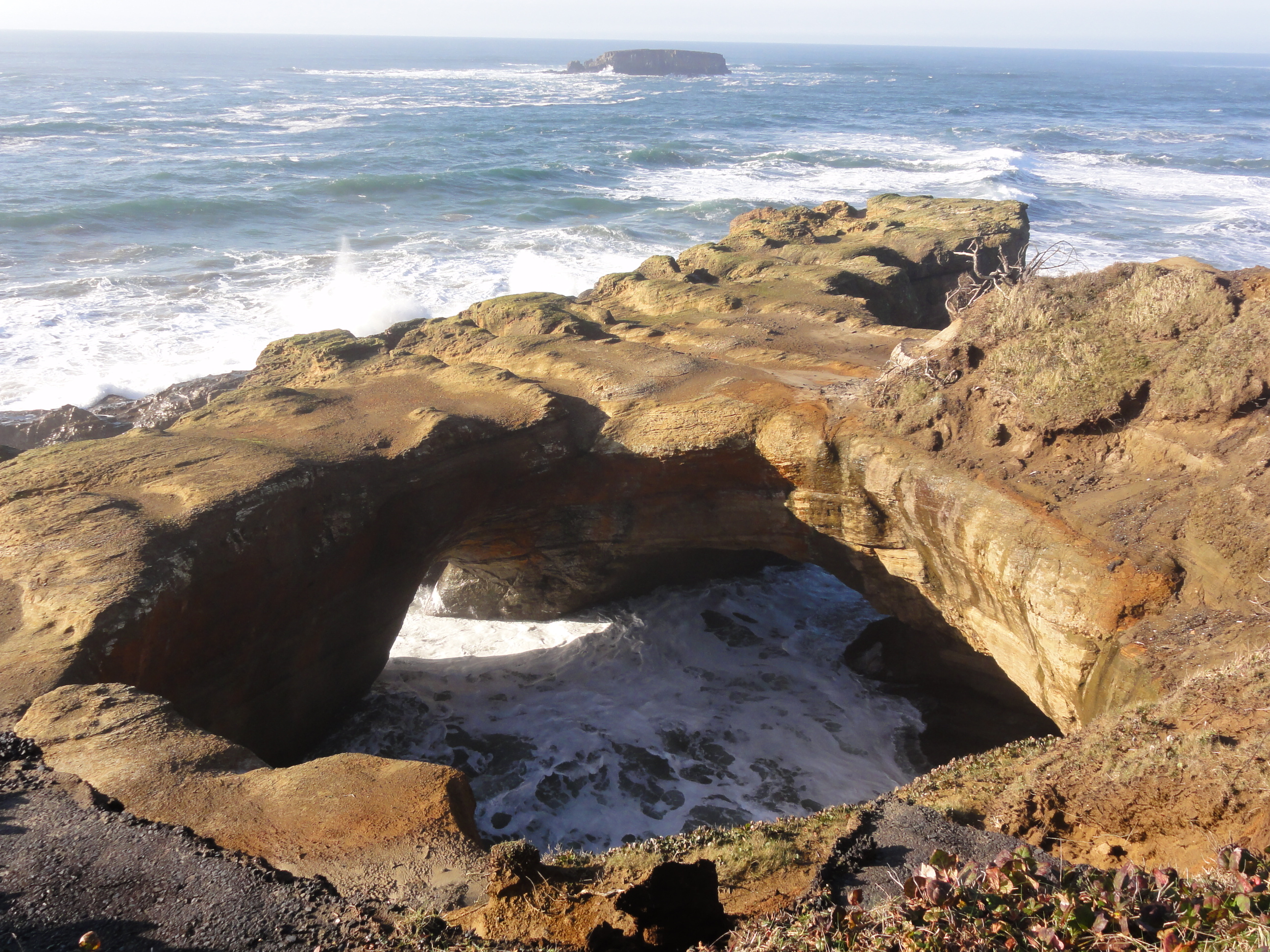
- Inside the Punch Bowl

- Location within Oregon Location within the United States
- Type: Public, state
- Location: Lincoln County, Oregon
- Nearest city: Depoe Bay
- Coordinates: 44°44′49″N 124°03′53″W
- Created: 1929
- Operator: Oregon Parks and Recreation Department

Devils Punch Bowl State Natural Area is a state day use park on the central Oregon Coast in the United States. It is centered on a large bowl naturally carved in a rock headland which is partially open to the Pacific Ocean. Waves enter the bowl and often violently churn, swirl, and foam. Outside the bowl, ocean conditions are attractive to surfers near a large offshore rock pinnacle named Gull Rock, located about 1/2 mile (800 m) west-northwest of Devils Punch Bowl, which funnels and concentrates waves easily seen from the park. There are at least seventeen large rocks, part of Oregon Islands National Wildlife Refuge, which provide interesting wave viewing, and attract and provide a home for wildlife.

Devils Punch Bowl is located about 5 miles (8.0 km) south of Depoe Bay, and about 8 miles (13 km) north of Newport in the community of Otter Rock, and about 1/4 mile (400 m) west of U.S. Route 101. The park encompasses 5.34 acres (2 ha), which includes picnic grounds. There is a trail for access to the beach, and tide pools.

The bowl is thought to have been created when two caves carved by the ocean collapsed.

Whales migrate past the park, in season, and the park, which projects into the Pacific, provides panoramic views of the ocean and good whale watching.

== History ==
At one time the Punch Bowl was referred to as "Satan's Cauldron". The park was acquired in at least three parcels between 1929 and 1952. The Civilian Conservation Corps installed a fresh water system, sanitary works, picnic tables, stoves, trails, and safety fences.

Park attendance in 1963 totaled 228,528 visitors. June through October is the park's busiest season.

== Danger ==
During low tide, the location is safe to explore as a sightseeing destination, but during high tide the Devils Punch Bowl has endangered or killed surfers and tourists. The Depoe Bay Fire District advised the public exercise extreme caution when visiting the area.

- March 26th, 2010: Four surfers were caught in a rip-current and pulled into the turbulent cove before being rescued by a Coast Guard helicopter.
- December 1st, 2018: Dr. Toren Stearns, 31 years old, drowned while surfing near the Devils Punch Bowl.
- August 23rd, 2023: Tou Yang, 43 years old, dove into the lake but was unable to climb out of the water after resurfacing. He drowned and his body was recovered 4 hours later.
- May 9th, 2024: A hiker trapped by slick rocks was rescued by firefighters with rope before the tide rose.
- June 3rd, 2026: A woman fell in from the rim of the bowl into water and died of her injuries the following day.

“The currents create that natural rip and if people aren’t familiar with the area they try to fight the rip and it tires them out. It is also fairly shallow and they can hit the bottom of the ocean and sustain injuries that way as well.” - Depoe Bay Fire Chief Bill Johnson

== See also ==
- List of Oregon state parks
- Whale Watching Center
