= Center Street Bridge (Salem, Oregon) =

Bridge across the Willamette River in Salem, Oregon, U.S.

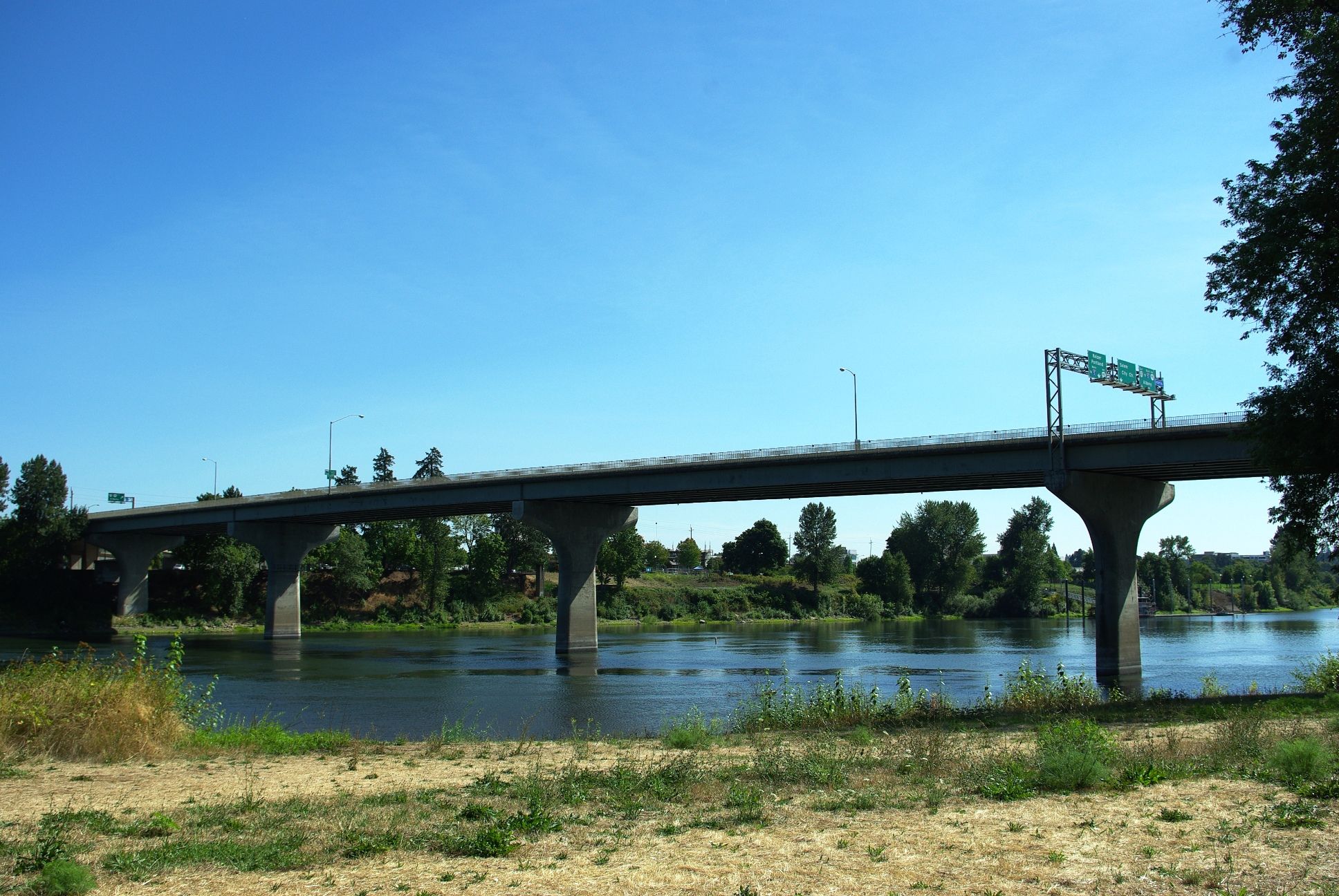
- Coordinates: 44°56′42″N 123°02′36″W
- Carries: OR 22 (Center Street)
- Crosses: Willamette River
- Locale: Salem, Oregon
- Maintained by: Marion County

Characteristics
- Design: Plate girder

History
- Opened: November 20, 1984 (replaced 1918 bridge)

Location
- Interactive map of Center Street Bridge

The Center Street Bridge is a road bridge located in Salem, Oregon, United States. It spans the Willamette River, connecting West Salem and Oregon Route 22 to Salem. It carries vehicle traffic eastbound from Route 22 and directly from Wallace Road. Traffic exits onto Center Street directly, and onto Front Street via a pair of northbound and southbound off-ramps. The current bridge structure, opened in 1984, replaced the previous bridge on this site that was built in 1918.

== History ==
Various crossings have existed on the site of the Center Street Bridge over the years. The previous bridge, opened in 1918 and replaced a steel bridge that had been built in 1891, initially carried two-way vehicle traffic. It was later switched to eastbound-only when the westbound-only Marion Street Bridge opened in 1954. The 1918 bridge was reconstructed in 1983 after the completion of a widening project from two to four lanes on the Marion Street Bridge. The current structure carries four eastbound vehicular travel lanes and a multi-use path.

== See also ==
- List of crossings of the Willamette River
