= Luckiamute River =

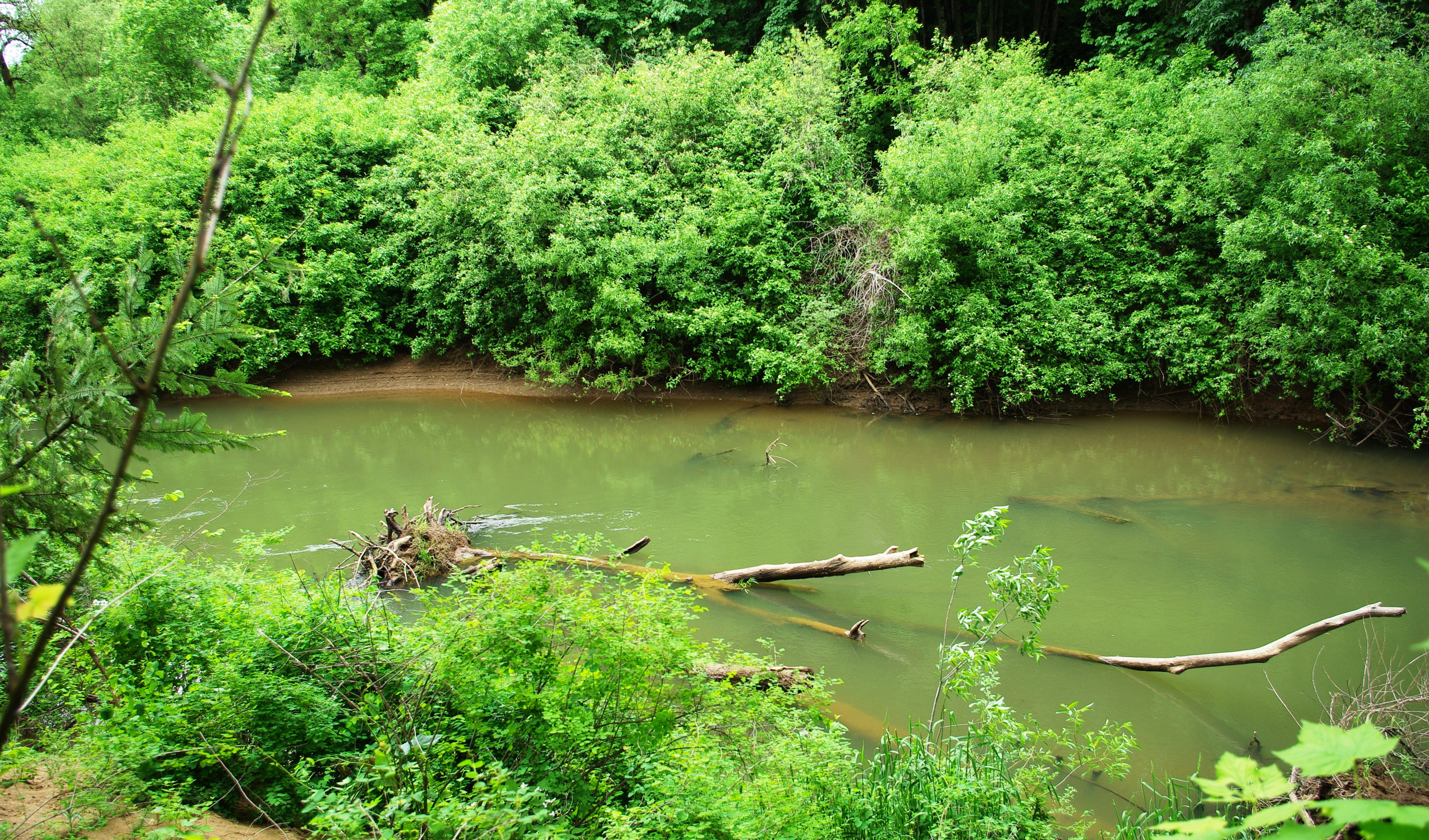
- Luckiamute River at Sarah Helmick State Recreation Site

- Location of the mouth of the Luckiamute River in Oregon
- Etymology: Native American but of unknown meaning

Location
- Country: United States
- State: Oregon
- County: Polk and Benton

Physical characteristics
- Source: Central Oregon Coast Range
  - location: near Bald Mountain, Polk County
  - coordinates: 44°47′28″N 123°32′45″W
  - elevation: 2,684 ft (818 m)
- Mouth: Willamette River
  - location: near Buena Vista, Polk County
  - coordinates: 44°45′15″N 123°08′54″W
  - elevation: 157 ft (48 m)
- Length: 61 mi (98 km)
- Basin size: 315 sq mi (820 km^{2})
- Discharge
  - location: Helmick State Recreation Site, 13.5 miles (21.7 km) from the mouth
  - average: 872 cu ft/s (24.7 m^{3}/s)
  - minimum: 0.65 cu ft/s (0.018 m^{3}/s)
  - maximum: 32,900 cu ft/s (930 m^{3}/s)

The Luckiamute River is a tributary of the Willamette River, about 61 miles (98 km) long, in western Oregon in the United States. It drains an area of Central Oregon Coast Range and the western Willamette Valley northwest of Corvallis.

It rises in the remote mountains of southwestern Polk County, about 10 miles (16 km) west of Pedee. It flows southeast to Hoskins in Benton County, then northeast into Polk County, past Pedee, then east across southern Polk County. It is joined from the northwest by the Little Luckiamute River. It joins the Willamette from the west about 10 miles (16 km) north of Albany. The mouth of the river is about 1/4 mile (400 m) downstream from the mouth of the Santiam River, which enters the Willamette from the east 108 miles (174 km) upstream of the Willamette's mouth on the Columbia River.

Named tributaries from source to mouth are Boulder, Beaver, Miller, Wolf, Rock Pit, Slick, Cougar, Slide, and Harris creeks. Further downstream are Hull, Foster, Jones, Bonner, Vincent, Plunkett, and Price creeks. Maxfield Creek is next followed by Bump, Ritner, Pedee, McTimmonds, Link, Dry, and Jont creeks followed by the Little Luckiamute River. Soap Creek enters the main stem along the Luckiamute's lower reaches.

The Luckiamute Watershed Council includes Ash Creek in its watershed study area, although it drains directly into the Willamette River.

== See also ==
- List of rivers of Oregon
- List of longest streams of Oregon
