= Pedee, Oregon =

Unincorporated community in the state of Oregon, United States

Coordinates: 44°45′12″N 123°24′50″W

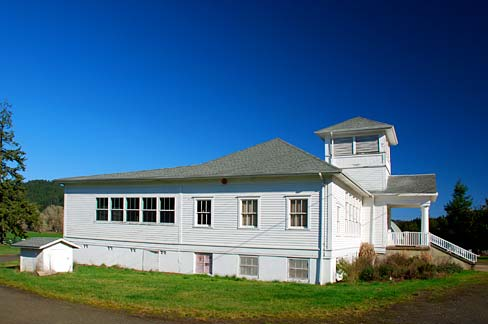
Pedee School

Pedee is an unincorporated community in Polk County, Oregon, United States. Pedee is at the intersection of Oregon Route 223 and Maple Grove Road. It is part of the Salem Metropolitan Statistical Area.
