= Oregon Route 223 =

State highway in western Oregon, US

Oregon Route 223
- Route 223; mainline in red, spur route in blue

Route information
- Maintained by ODOT
- Length: 31.40 mi (50.53 km)

Major junctions
- South end: US 20 in Wren
- OR 194 near Bridgeport
- North end: OR 22 near Dallas

Location
- Country: United States
- State: Oregon
- Counties: Benton, Polk

Highway system
- Oregon Highways; Interstate; US; State; Named; Scenic
← OR 222	→ OR 224

Oregon Route 223 is a state highway in the U.S. State of Oregon, which runs between the town of Wren, Oregon and the city of Dallas, Oregon. It is known as the Kings Valley Highway No. 191 (see Oregon highways and routes) and is 31 miles (50 km) long. It lies in Benton and Polk counties.

== Route description ==
OR 223 begins at an intersection with U.S. Route 20 in Wren northwest of Philomath. It continues north from there, through the western edge of the Willamette Valley. In the town of Bridgeport, it intersects with OR 194. The only major city on the route is Dallas, Oregon; north of Dallas, it ends at an intersection with OR 22.

=== Covered bridge ===
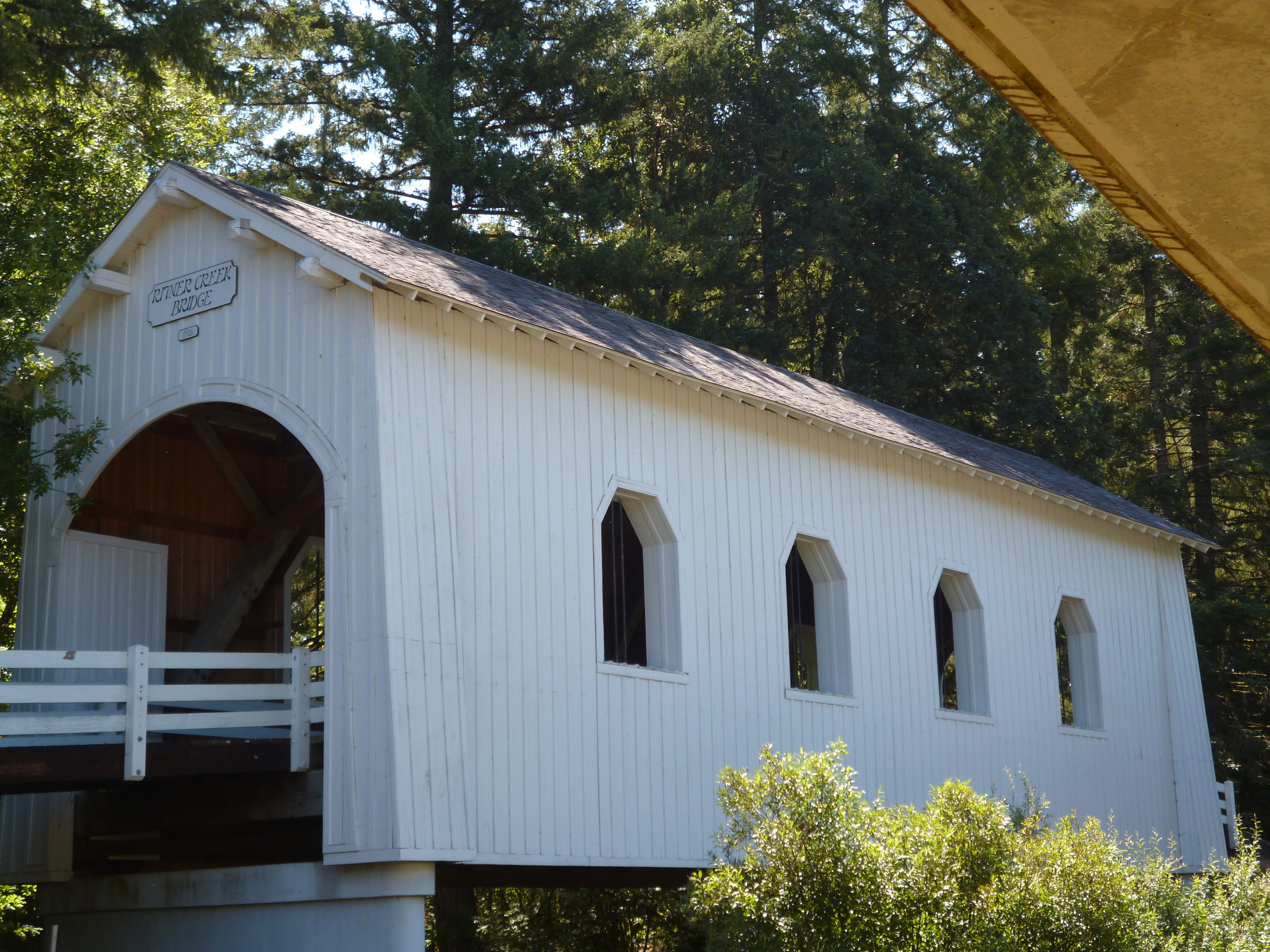
The Ritner Creek Covered Bridge along Oregon 223

The Ritner Creek Bridge was the last covered bridge on a state highway in Oregon. It was on OR 223 between Pedee and Kings Valley, about 15 miles south of Dallas, or 10 miles north of the junction with US 20 in Wren. Built in 1927, the bridge was replaced in 1976 and relocated just downstream and parallel to the new span.

== Major intersections ==
County	Location	mi	km	Destinations	Notes
Benton	Wren	31.40	50.53	US 20 – Philomath, Blodgett, Corvallis, Newport	
Polk		9.95	16.01	OR 194 east – Monmouth, Independence	
Polk	Dallas	2.63	4.23	OR 223 Spur east (Ellendale Avenue) to OR 22	
Polk		0.00	0.00	OR 22 – Rickreall, Salem, Valley Junction, Oregon Coast	
1.000 mi = 1.609 km; 1.000 km = 0.621 mi

== Related route ==
Oregon Route 223 Spur
- Location: Dallas to Rickreall
- Length: 4.32 mi (6.95 km)

A spur route (signed as Oregon Route 223 Spur) runs from Dallas east to a partial interchange with OR 22, immediately west of OR 22's interchange with OR 99W in Rickreall. The spur is a former OR 22 routing.

The entire route is in Polk County.

Location	mi	km	Destinations	Notes
Dallas	0.00	0.00	OR 223	Intersection of Kings Valley Highway and Ellendale Avenue
Rickreall	3.25	5.23	To OR 22 west / OR 99W	At-grade intersection (signed as Rickreall Road); former OR 22 routing
Rickreall	4.27– 4.32	6.87– 6.95	OR 22 east – Salem	Partial interchange with OR 22 (westbound entrance and eastbound exit); no access between OR 223 Spur and OR 99W/ OR 22 westbound
1.000 mi = 1.609 km; 1.000 km = 0.621 mi: Incomplete access
