= Hood to Coast =

Relay race held in Oregon, United States

Hood To Coast is a long distance relay race that starts at Mount Hood and continues nearly 200 miles (320 km) to the Oregon Coast. Known as "the mother of all relays", it is the largest running and walking relay in the world, with 12,600 runners in the Hood To Coast relay and 19,000 total participants, including events like the Portland To Coast Walk. Founded in 1982, Hood To Coast is extremely popular and has filled its team limit for the past 36 years, and for 32 straight years on opening day of the lottery.

The race is held annually in late August, traditionally on the Friday and Saturday before the Labor Day weekend. The course runs approximately 320 kilometres (200 mi) (the course length changes by 1–5 kilometres (0.62–3.11 mi) each year due to small changes made by race organizers) from Timberline Lodge on the slopes of Mount Hood, the tallest peak in Oregon, through the Portland metropolitan area, and over the Oregon Coast Range to the beach town of Seaside on the Oregon Coast. Teams of 12 runners take turns running legs along the course. Walking teams may choose to compete in the Portland To Coast Walk, which is held in conjunction with the main Hood To Coast Relay and starts at the Tilikum Crossing Bridge near downtown Portland instead of Mount Hood.

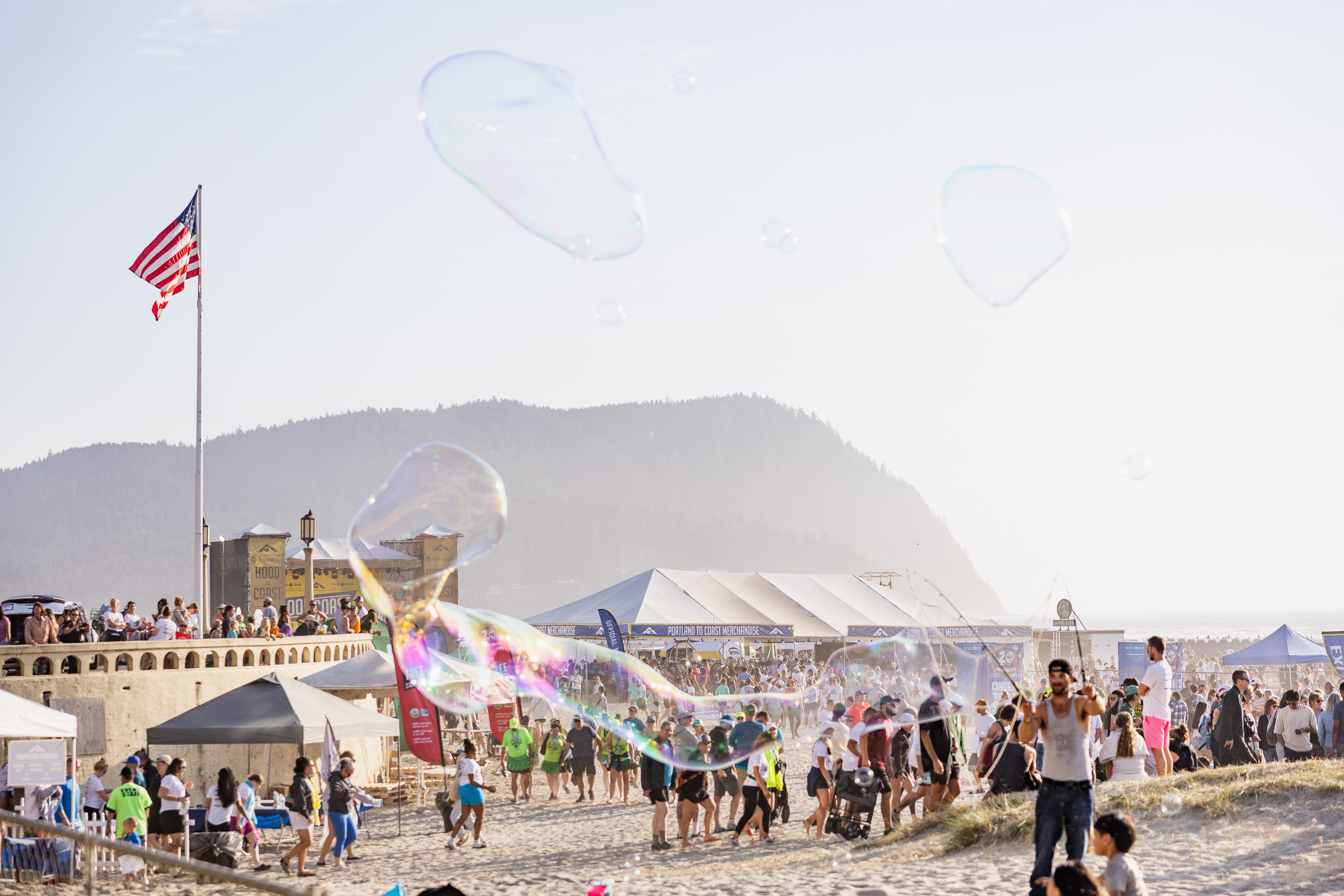

== History ==
The relay was founded by Bob Foote, who was President of the Oregon Road Runners Club and an ultra-marathon runner. The first relay in 1982 drew eight teams that ran 165 miles (266 km) from Timberline to Kiwanda Beach near Pacific City, Oregon.

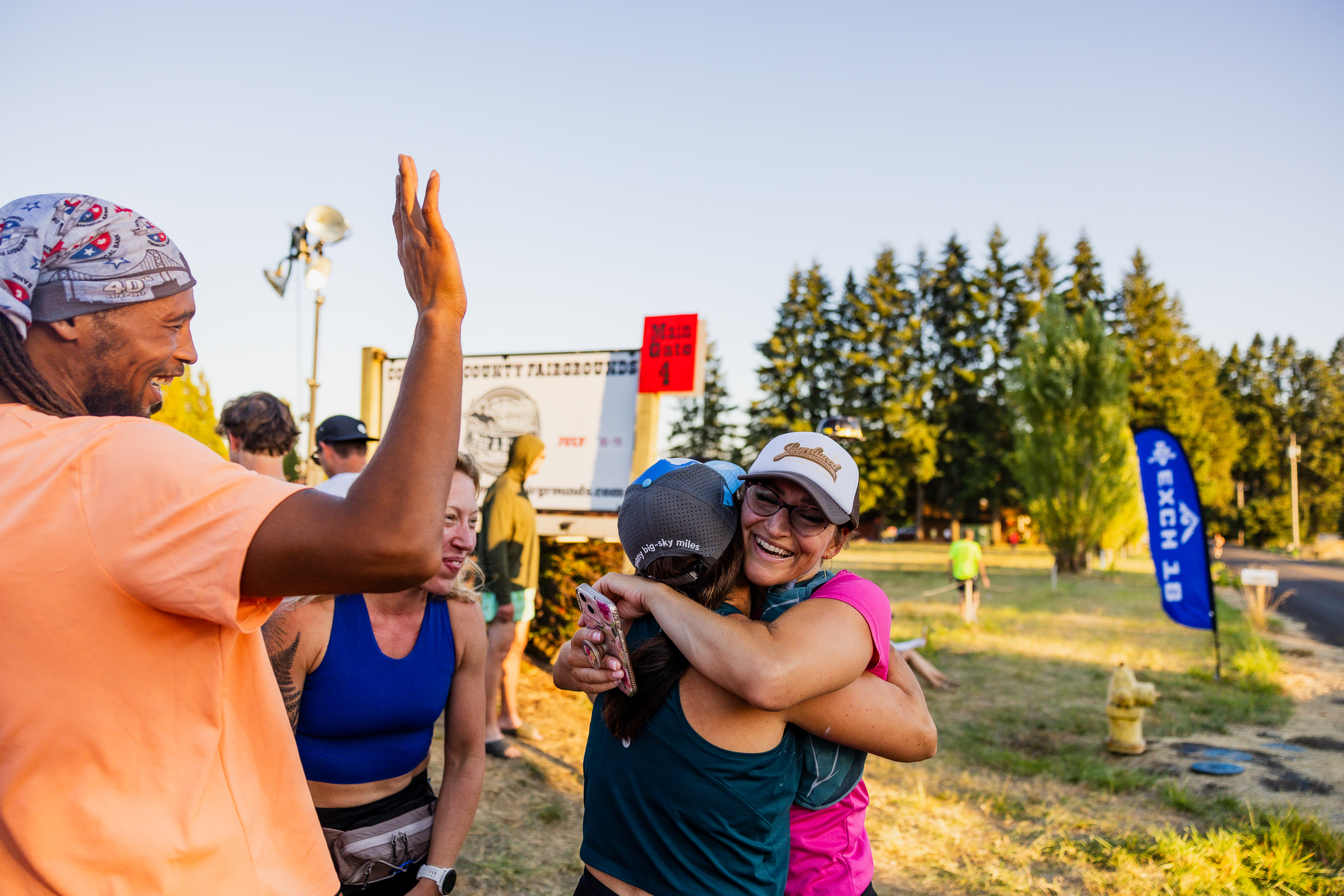
HTC Exchange 18 embrace

In 2006, Felicia Hubber, joined the organization to oversee race logistics, as Race Director and Chairperson, overseeing the long-term vision and Hood To Coast mission moving forward.

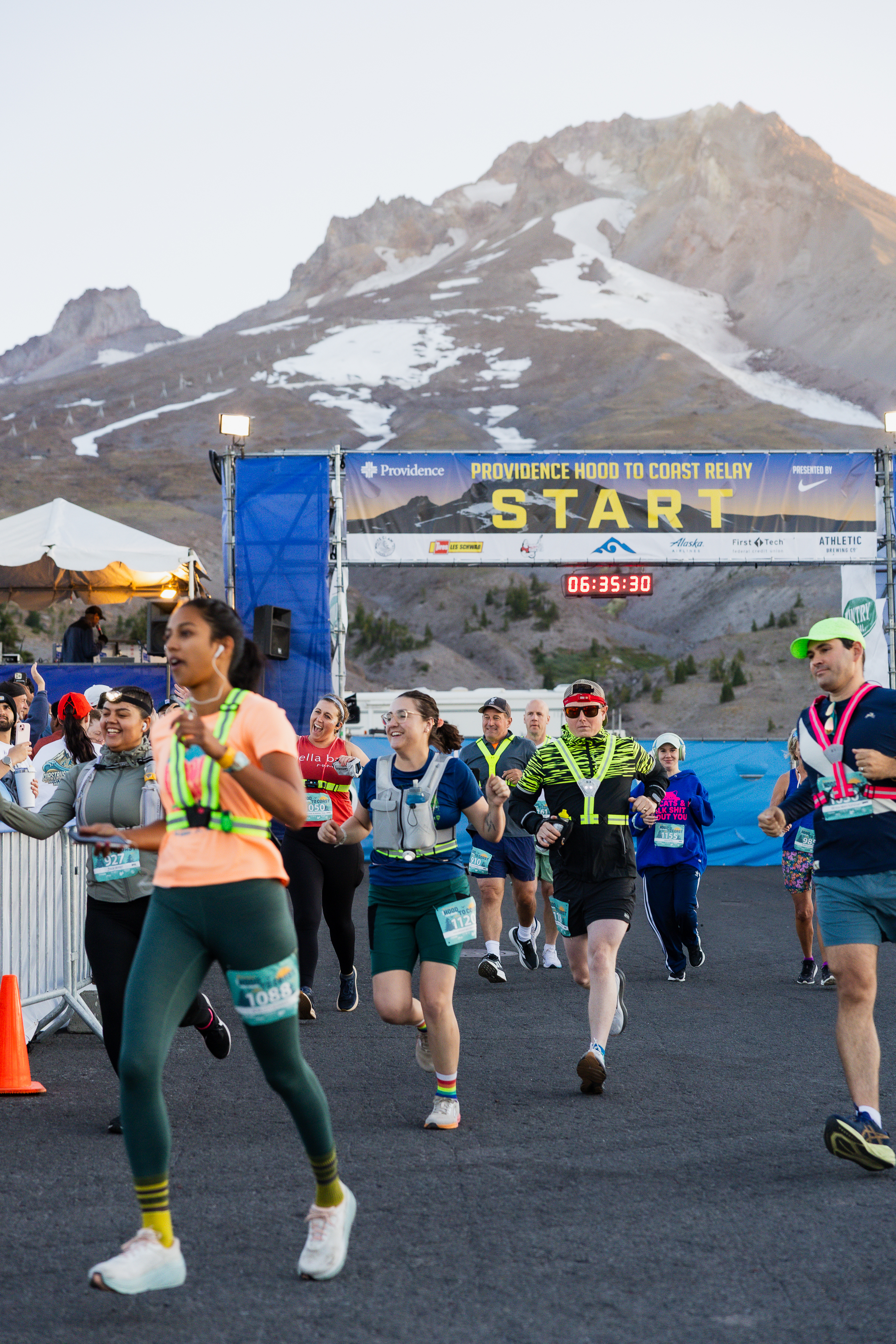

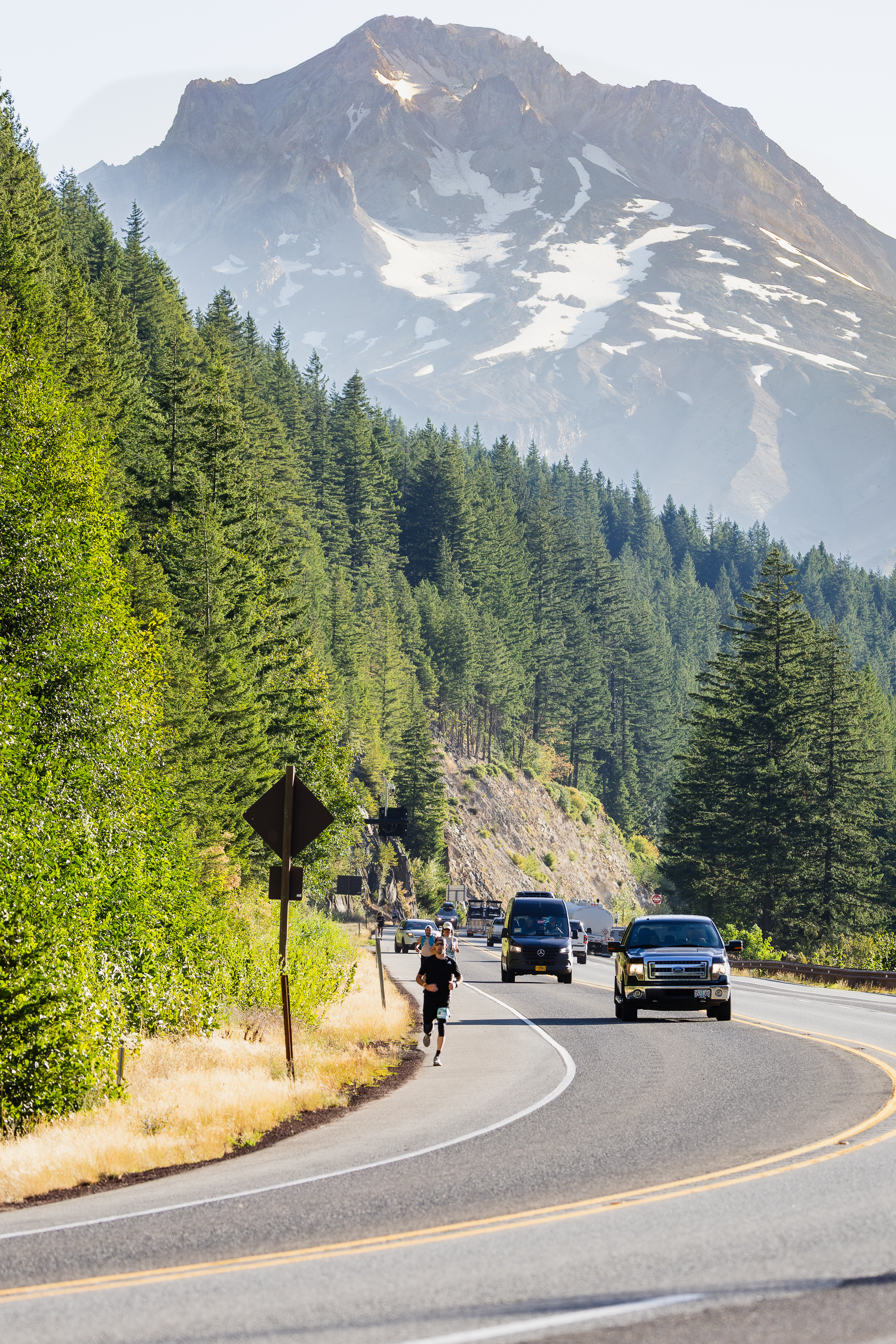
Hood To Coast Leg 2 running off the mountain

== Course ==
The 320-kilometre (200 mi) Hood To Coast course consists of 36 legs; each team member runs three in rotation. The course is run primarily on paved roads and multi-use off-street trails, with small portions of the course on sidewalks and gravel roads. The legs vary in length from 5.4 to 12.5 kilometres (3.4 to 7.8 mi); some legs are virtually flat, and others descend and/or ascend steep mountainous hills. Consequently, a runner or walker may total between 21.9 and 31.7 kilometres (13.6 and 19.7 mi). Teams in the full Hood To Coast Relay must complete the course within a 36-hour time limit.

Teams start on Friday between 3:00 a.m. and 2:00 p.m. in staggered waves of approximately 15 teams every 5 minutes. Teams are seeded based on previous race pace times (extrapolated based on a specific deterioration factor over three legs, taking into account additional factors) for each team's submitted roster. Thus the flow of teams through the 35 exchange points and finish line remains relatively smooth, with all teams finishing the race by the closing time of 9 p.m. on Saturday.

The course starts at Timberline Lodge at the 6,000-foot (1,800 m) level of Mount Hood, and proceeds down Timberline Road to Government Camp. This first leg drops 2,000 feet (610 m) in elevation over about 6 miles (9.7 km); the next two legs from Government Camp to Rhododendron have a combined elevation drop of 2,300 feet (700 m) over about 10 miles (16 km).

Runners proceed west along U.S. Route 26 to the towns of Sandy and Gresham, where the route proceeds along the Springwater Corridor Trail to the Sellwood neighborhood in southeast Portland. The route then proceeds north along the paved Springwater/Willamette River Trail and crosses the Tilikum Crossing bridge west into downtown Portland.

After going over the Tilikum Crossing Bridge, runners proceed north along Naito Parkway in downtown Portland along the west bank of the Willamette River and onto U.S. Route 30 to St. Helens. From there onward, the route passes through hilly rural and sometimes unpaved backroads through the forested communities of Mist and Birkenfeld on the way to the beach finish line party in Seaside.

The Portland To Coast Walk Relay follows the last 24 legs (130 miles) of the course, starting from the Tilikum Crossing Bridge in downtown Portland. Each participant in the PTC Walk Relay walk two legs in rotation.

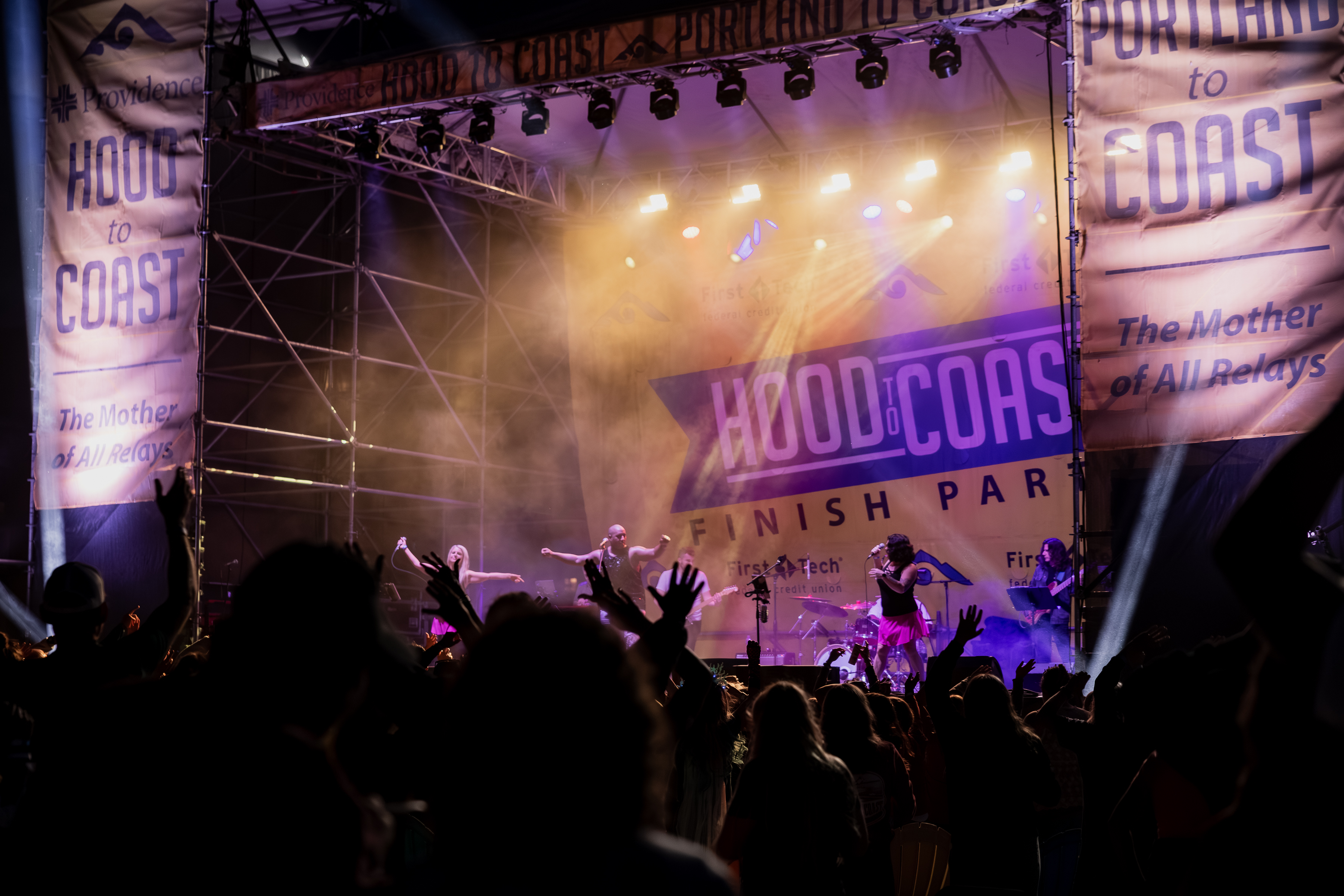
HTC Finish eve party

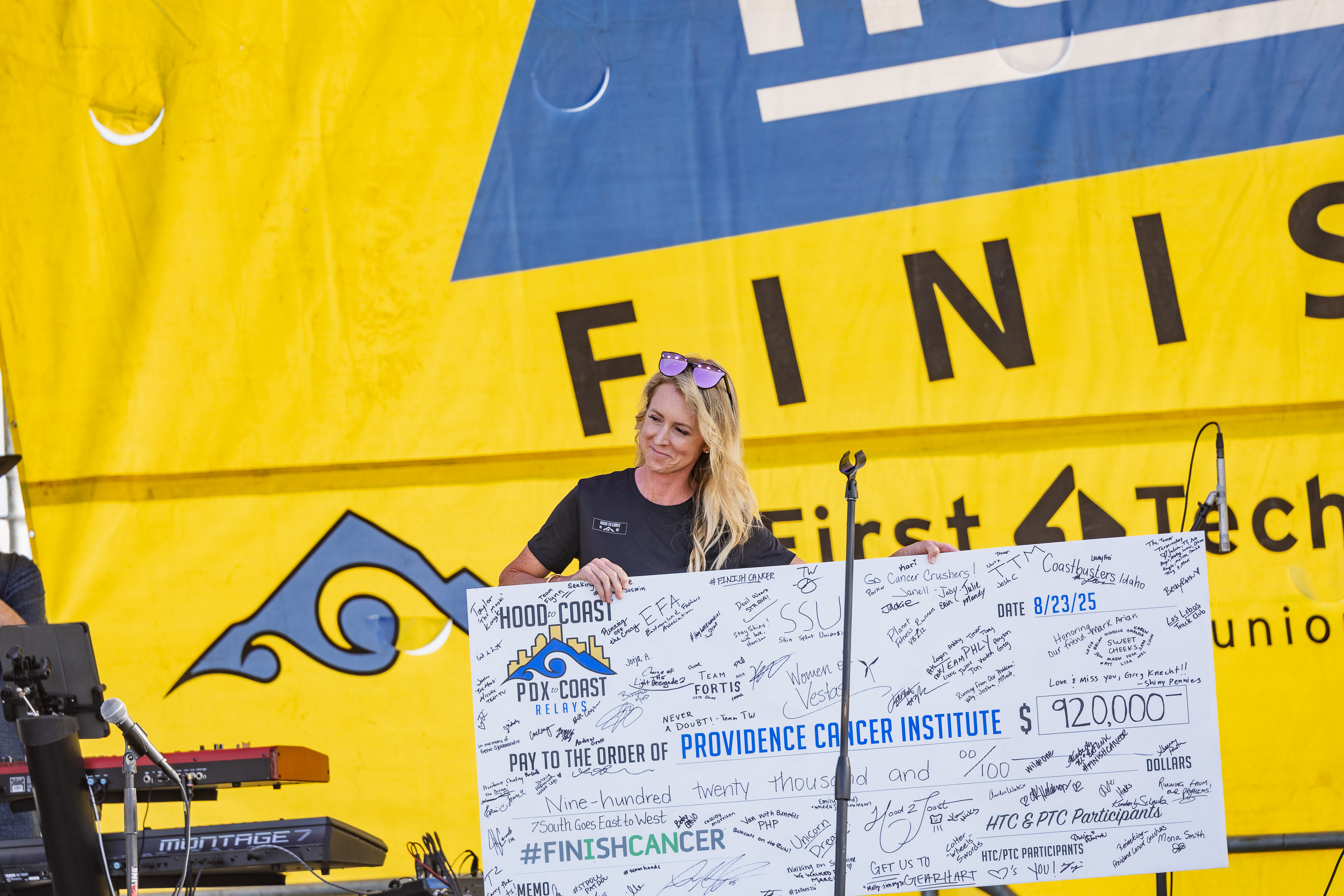
HTC Providence team fundraising results_Race Director Felicia Hubber

== Logistics and atmosphere ==
Each twelve-person team is allowed two vehicles no larger than a standard-sized van. While the vans generally follow the race course in support of their runners, certain narrower portions of the course require one van to make a predetermined detour route to alleviate traffic congestion. Teams typically give themselves funny names, dress in costume, and some decorate their vehicles according to a theme.

Teams are expected to provide their own provisions. Local schools, granges and churches along the route provide sleeping areas, food, and showers to participants as fundraisers. Teams compete in divisions and are awarded for a top six placement. At the large finish festivities during the beach party, photos, an expansive beer/wine garden, food and live music keep participants and spectators going throughout the day and evening.

All teams that include at least one member living within a 100-mile (160 km) radius of Portland are required to provide three volunteers to ensure adequate personnel at turns and exchange points along the 200 mile race course.

== Media ==
The race was the subject of the 2011 film Hood to Coast, directed by Christoph Baaden. The film chronicles four teams, their back story and inspiration for running, while watching their heartfelt experiences in the race.
