= Jewell School =

Public school in Oregon, United States

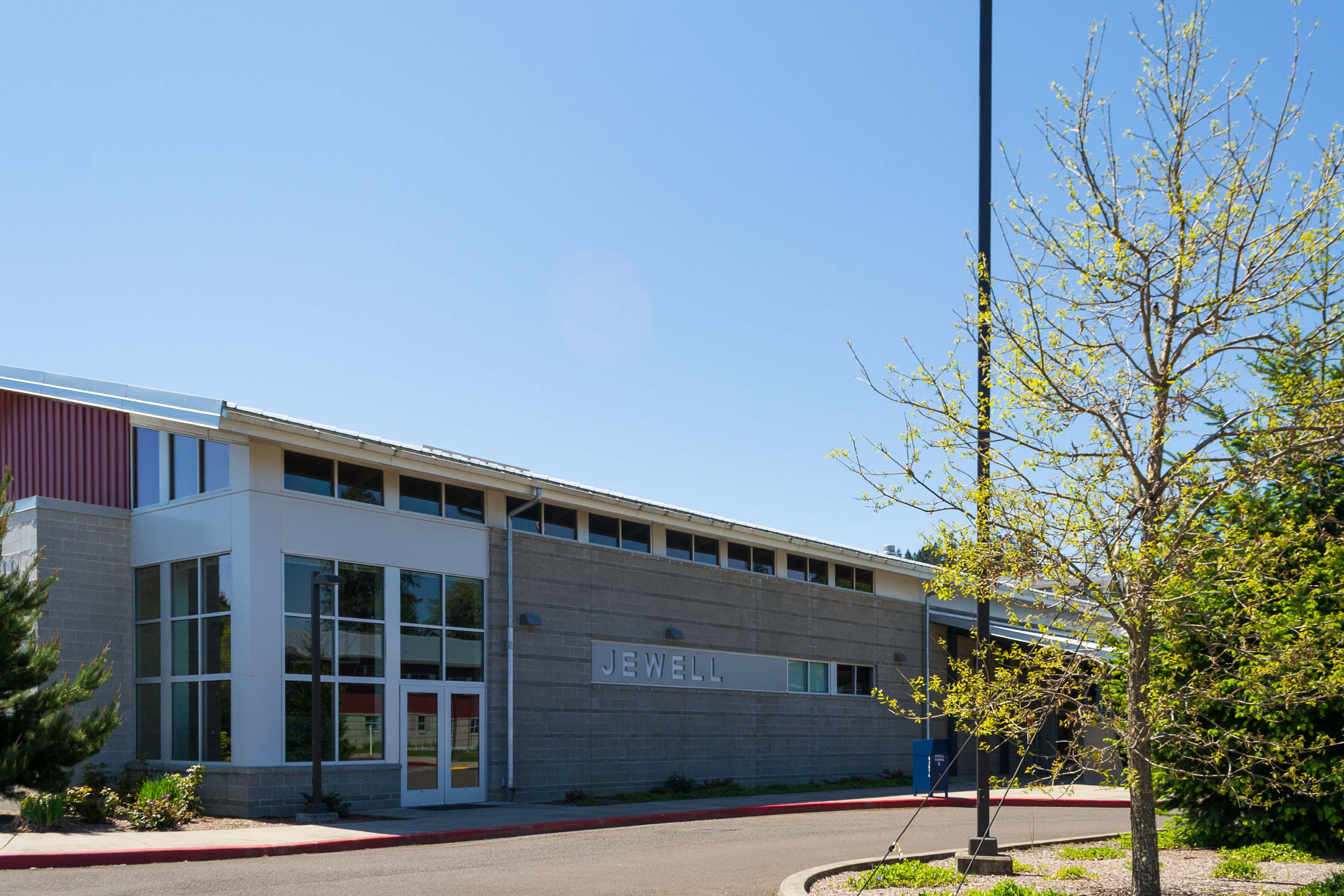

Location
- 83874 Highway 103; Seaside, (Columbia County), Oregon 97138; United States
- Coordinates: 45.929821°N 123.498253°W

Information
- Type: Public
- School district: Jewell School District
- Principal: Jon Wood
- Grades: PK-12
- Enrollment: 175
- Colors: Blue and gold
- Athletics conference: OSAA 1A-2 Casco League
- Mascot: Blue Jays
- Website: www.jewell.k12.or.us

Jewell School is a public school in Jewell, Oregon, United States. It is the only school in the Jewell School District. The school has a Seaside mailing address because Jewell no longer has a post office. For the 2008–2009 school year, Jewell School received $3.1 million in timber dollars (nearly ten times the revenue from taxes).

== Background ==
In 1969 it had 24 high school students, making it, along with the high school of Ukiah, the high school programs in the state with the lowest enrollments. In 1987 it had 42 high school students. In previous eras its oldest building was from 1913. By 1987 the buildings were replaced with multiple additions. In 1987 it was per capita the wealthiest school district in the state. This came from a large tax revenue and a small enrollment.

== Operations ==
In 1987 the school placed two elementary grades in one classroom each, with one teacher and one aide per classroom. In 1987 the Jewell School District had 80 acres (32 ha) of land that it used for outdoor activities.

== Academics ==
In 2008, 63% of the school's seniors received a high school diploma. Of eight students, five graduated and three dropped out.
