= Oregon Route 103 =

State highway in Clatsop County, Oregon, US

Oregon Route 103
- Route 103 highlighted in red

Route information
- Maintained by ODOT
- Length: 9.02 mi (14.52 km)
- Existed: 2002–present

Major junctions
- South end: US 26 in Jewell Junction
- North end: OR 202 at Jewell

Location
- Country: United States
- State: Oregon
- County: Clatsop

Highway system
- Oregon Highways; Interstate; US; State; Named; Scenic
← US 101	→ OR 104

Oregon Route 103 is a 9.02-mile-long (14.52-kilometer) highway in the U.S. state of Oregon that runs between Jewell Junction and Jewell. It is also known as the Fishhawk Falls Highway No. 103 (see Oregon highways and routes), named after nearby Fishhawk Falls.

== Route description ==
The southern terminus of Oregon Route 103 is at a junction with U.S. Route 26 at Jewell Junction near Mishawaka and Elsie. OR 103 continues north, passing through Pope Corner, Vinemaple, and Tideport, and ending at a junction with Oregon Route 202 in Jewell.

== History ==
The Fishhawk Falls Highway No. 103 was established as a secondary highway on November 17, 1941. On September 19, 2002, Oregon Route 103 was assigned to the Fishhawk Falls Highway.

== Major intersections ==
The entire route is in Clatsop County.

Location	mi	km	Destinations	Notes
Jewell Junction	9.02	14.52	US 26 – Elsie, Forest Grove, Portland	
Jewell	0.00	0.00	OR 202 – Birkenfeld, Vernonia, Olney, Astoria	
1.000 mi = 1.609 km; 1.000 km = 0.621 mi

== Gallery ==
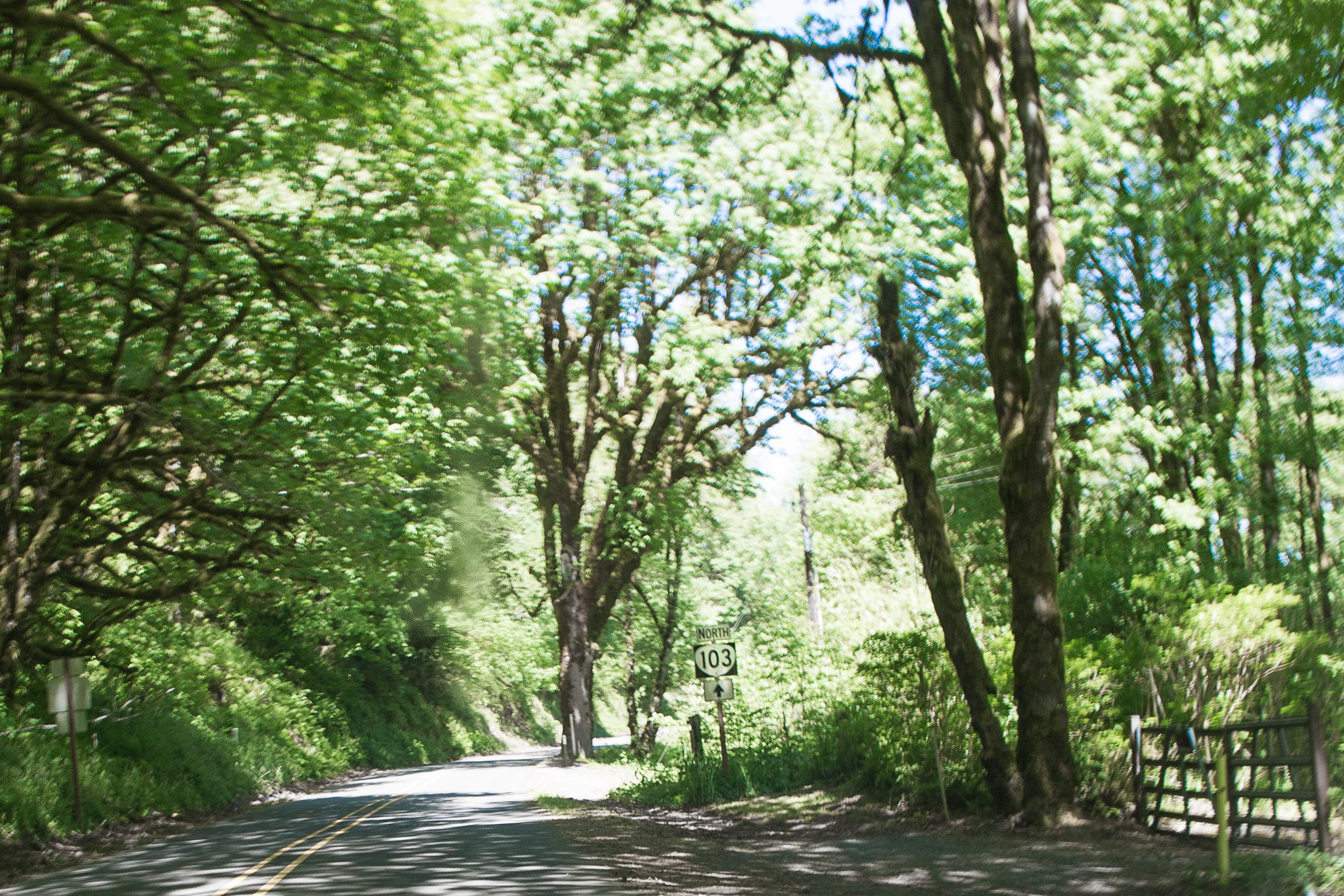
A view of Oregon Route 103, heading north

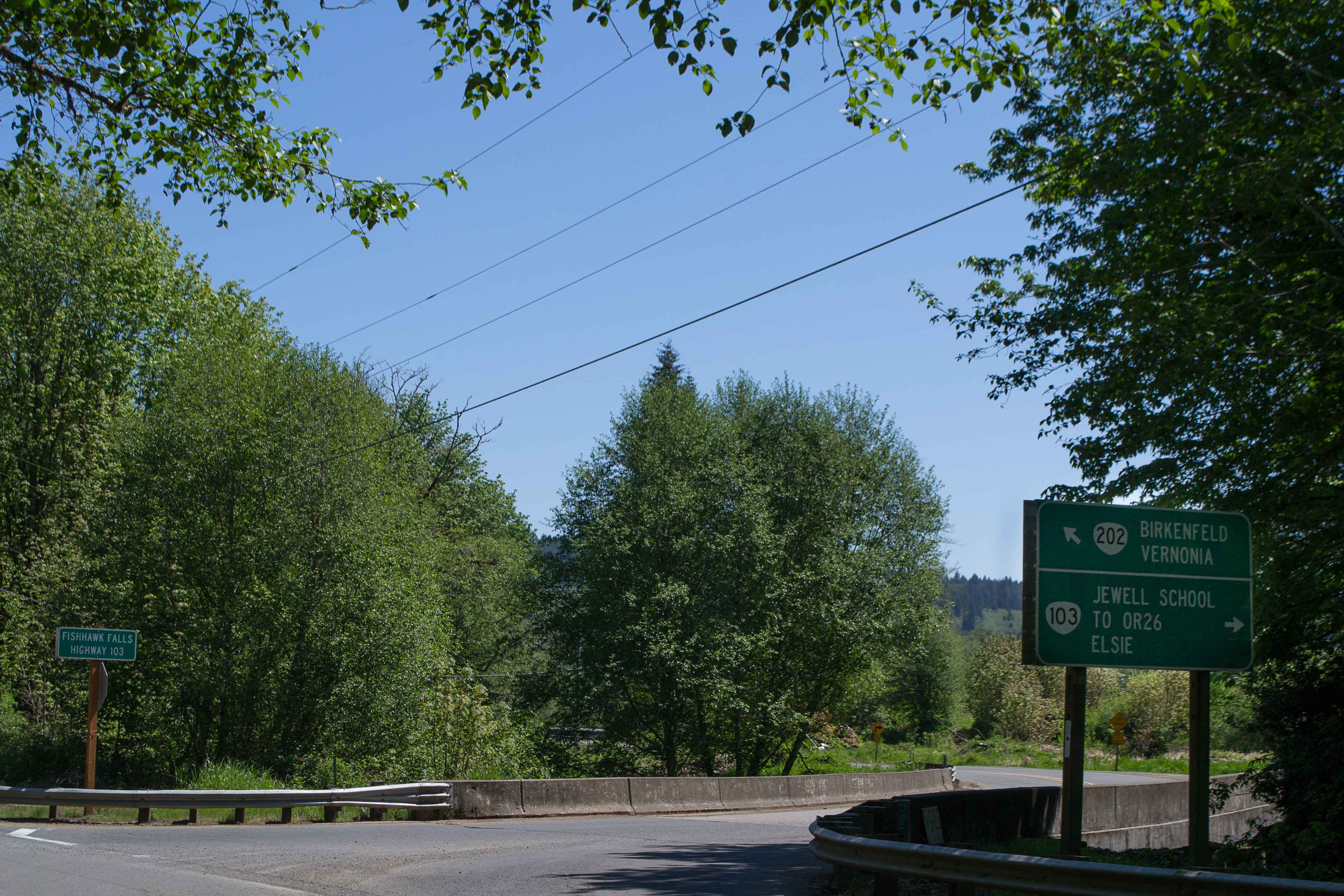
The northern terminus of Oregon Route 103

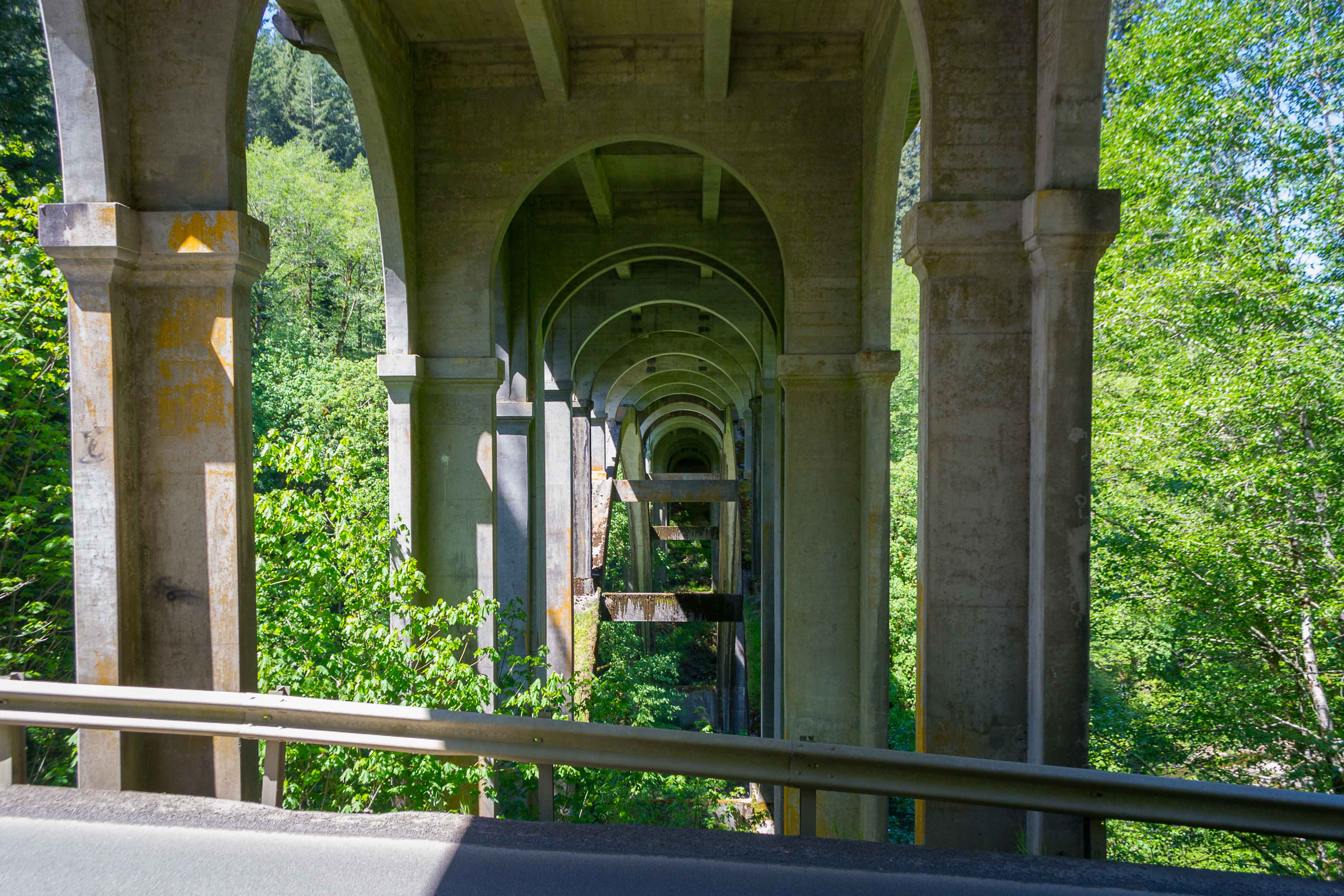
The Nehalem River Bridge conducts US 26 traffic over the Nehalem River and OR 103 in northwestern Oregon
