= Oregon Route 47 =

State highway in northwestern Oregon, US

Oregon Route 47
- Route 47 highlighted in red

Route information
- Maintained by ODOT
- Length: 79.51 mi (127.96 km)
- Existed: 1932–present
- Component highways: Tualatin Valley Highway No. 29; Nehalem Highway No. 102; Sunset Highway No. 47; Mist–Clatskanie Highway No. 110

Major junctions
- South end: OR 99W near McMinnville
- OR 240 in Yamhill; OR 8 in Forest Grove; OR 6 in Banks; US 26 in Davies; US 26 in Staleys Junction; OR 202 in Mist
- North end: US 30 in Clatskanie

Location
- Country: United States
- State: Oregon

Highway system
- Oregon Highways; Interstate; US; State; Named; Scenic
← OR 46	→ OR 51

Oregon Route 47 is an Oregon state highway that runs between the Willamette Valley, near McMinnville, and the city of Clatskanie, along the Columbia River in the northwest part of the state. OR 47 traverses several highways of the Oregon state highway system: part of the Tualatin Valley Highway No. 29, part of the Nehalem Highway No. 102, part of the Sunset Highway No. 47, and the Mist–Clatskanie Highway No. 110.

== Route description ==
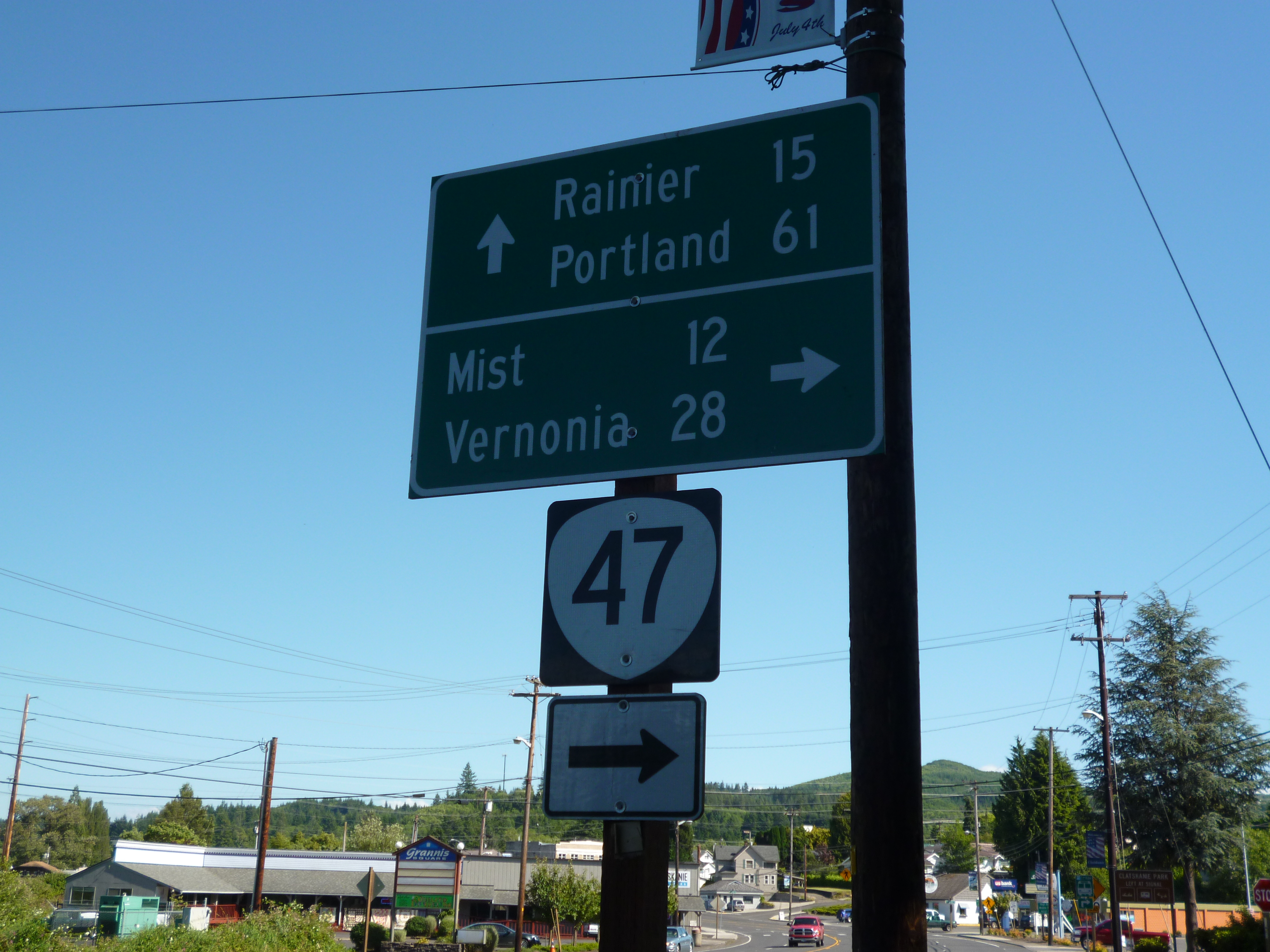
Start of Oregon Route 47 in Clatskanie, Oregon

Oregon Route 47 begins (at its southern terminus) at a junction with Oregon Route 99W between the cities of McMinnville and Lafayette. This stretch is known as the Tualatin Valley Highway. It continues north along the western edge of the Willamette Valley, hugging the Coast Range. It passes through parts of Oregon's wine country (and some prime agricultural land), and through small towns such as Carlton, Yamhill, and Gaston. The first large city encountered is Forest Grove. A bypass around the east side of town avoids the downtown area.

In Forest Grove, OR 47 intersects Oregon Route 8, and the Tualatin Valley Highway leaves Oregon Route 47, and continues east towards Hillsboro and Beaverton on Oregon Route 8. North of the intersection, OR 47 is known as the Nehalem Highway. It continues north, passing through the town of Banks. North of Banks, OR 47 shares an alignment for about 4 miles (6 km) with U.S. Route 26 over the Sunset Highway, which is—a bit confusingly—Highway 47. North of Manning, OR 47 and US 26 part ways. OR 47 continues north, following the North Fork of Dairy Creek to its source and passing L.L. "Stub" Stewart Memorial State Park and shortly thereafter reaching the summit called "Tophill" where the highway departs the Willamette River drainage and enters the Nehalem drainage. From Tophill, the highway quickly winds down to a tributary of the Nehalem River and finds the Nehalem River at the extinct community of Treharne.

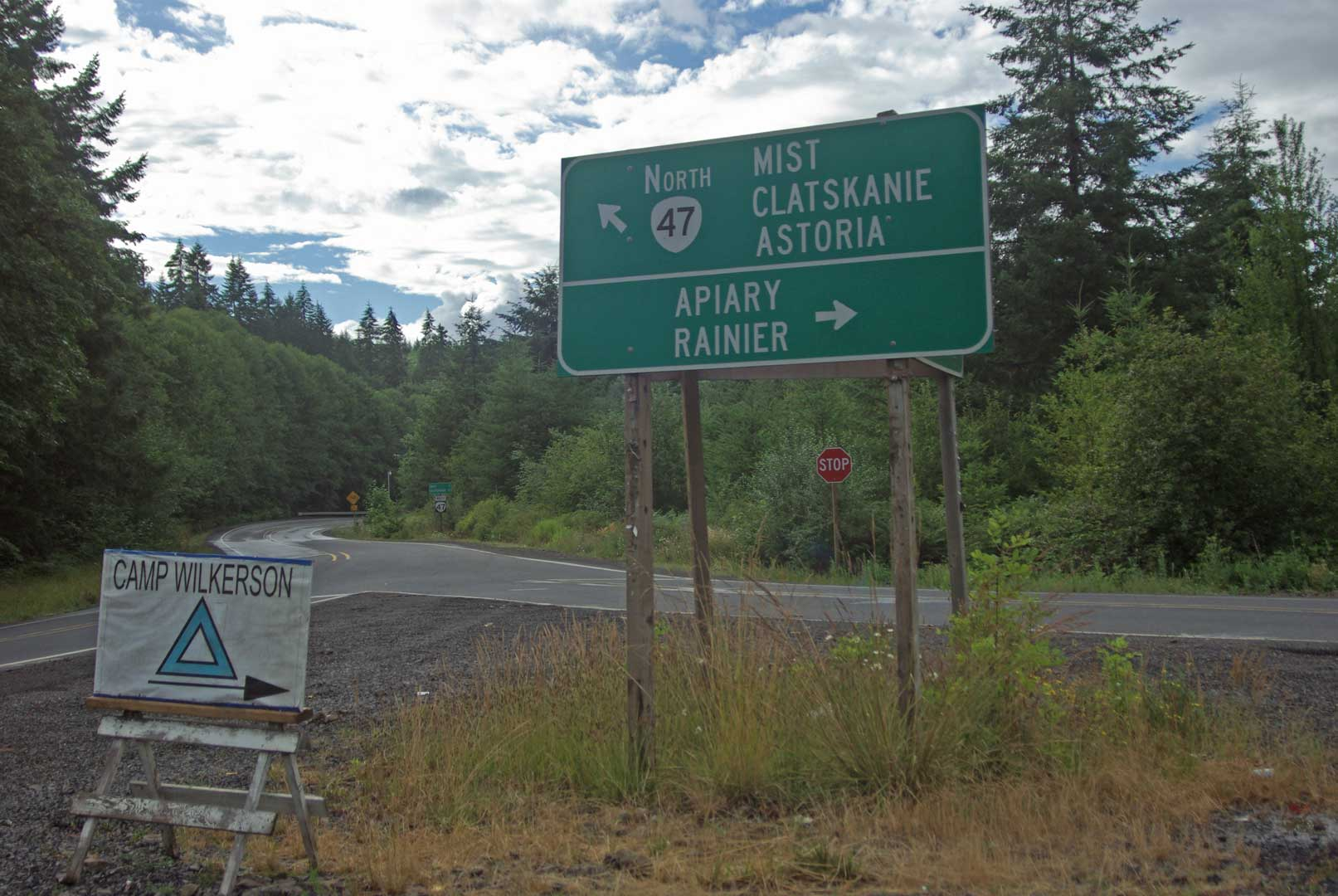
Apiary Junction

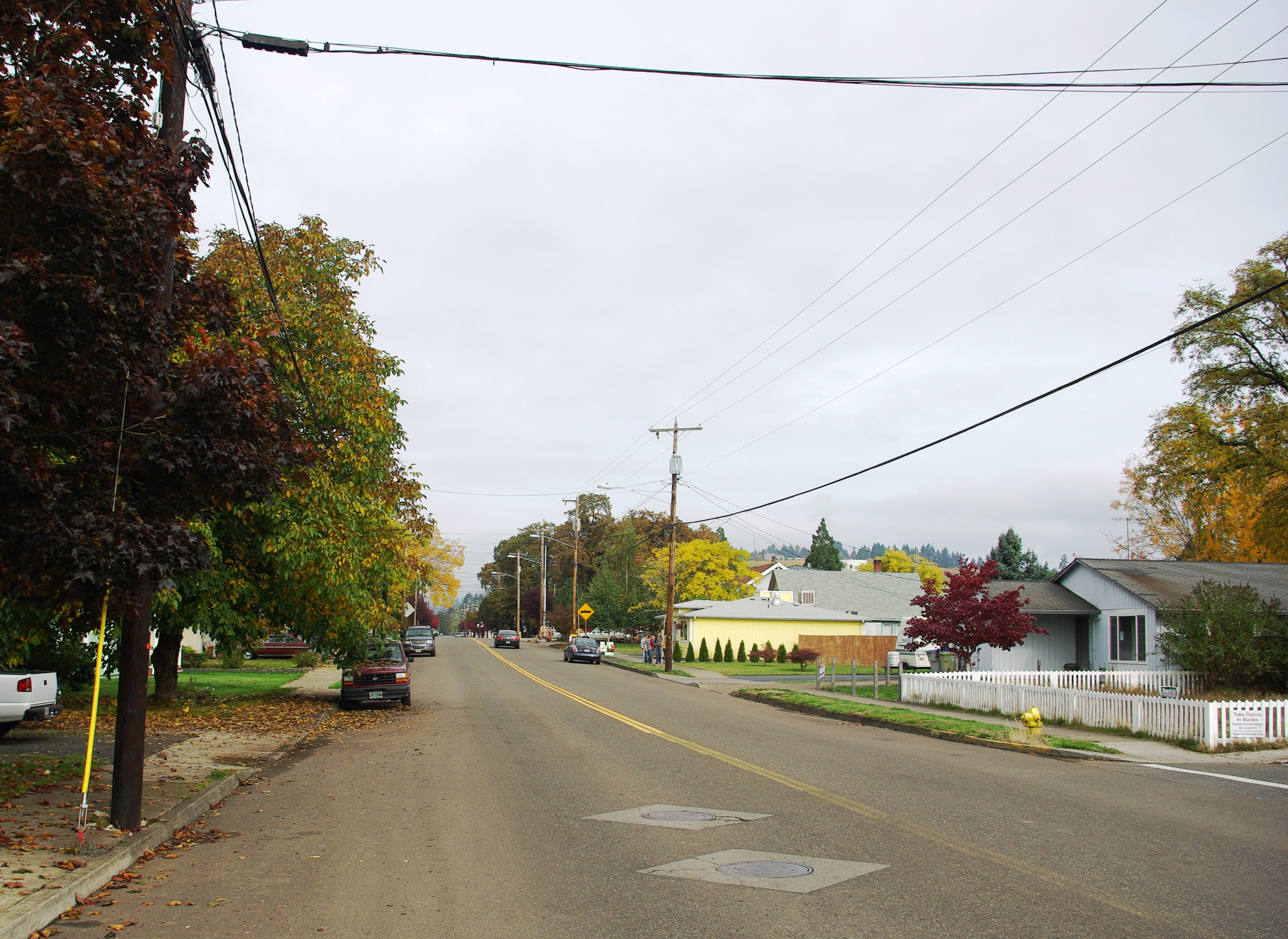
47 in Banks

Though in the mountainous Northern Oregon Coast Range, the Nehalem Highway itself is just winding, as it follows the banks of the Nehalem River all the way to Jewell, passing through Vernonia and Pittsburg. However, Pittsburg is little more than a road junction where the Scappoose-Vernonia Road breaks off and heads up the East Fork of the Nehalem River for Scappoose, Oregon. A few miles further north, Route 47 reaches the Apiary junction with destinations for Apiary and Rainier. The Apiary road is popular with truckers as it does not have the restrictive length limitations which are applied to OR 47 North of Mist or Oregon Route 202 west of Jewell because of numerous short turns.

After the town of Mist, the Nehalem Highway continues west towards Astoria as Oregon Route 202; OR 47 continues north for 12 miles (19 km) as the Mist-Clatskanie Highway. This stretch of OR 47 is rather mountainous, with many sharp turns and steep grades. Eventually, OR 47 descends out of the mountains into the Columbia River basin, and ends in the city of Clatskanie at an intersection with U.S. Route 30.

== Major intersections ==
Milepoints are as reported by ODOT and do not necessarily reflect current mileage. Z indicates overlapping mileage due to construction longer than established route, and – indicates negative mileage behind established beginning point. Segments that are locally maintained may be omitted. For routes traversing multiple named state highways, each milepoint is preceded by the corresponding state highway number.

County	Location	Milepoint	Destinations	Notes
Yamhill	Saint Joseph	29 42.46	OR 99W – Newberg, Portland, McMinnville	
Yamhill	Yamhill	29 34.47	OR 240 / Moores Valley Road – Newberg	
Washington	Forest Grove	29 17.88 102 90.64	OR 8 (Pacific Avenue) – Forest Grove City Center	
Washington	Banks	102 83.72	OR 6 – North Plains, Portland, Glenwood, Tillamook	Partial interchange
Washington	Davies Junction	102 (2)80.96 47 48.82	US 26 east – North Plains, Portland	Interchange; southern end of concurrency with US 26
Washington	Staleys Junction	47 45.41 102 76.96	US 26 west – Seaside	Northern end of concurrency with US 26
Columbia	Mist	102 46.14 110 11.89	OR 202 – Birkenfeld, Astoria	
Columbia		110 6.43	Clatskanie Mountain summit, elevation 1,347 feet (411 m)	
Columbia	Clatskanie	110 0.00	US 30 – Rainier, Portland, Astoria	
1.000 mi = 1.609 km; 1.000 km = 0.621 mi: Concurrency terminus
