= Nehalem Highway =

State highway in western Oregon, US

Nehalem Highway No. 102
- Nehalem Highway highlighted in red

Route information
- Maintained by ODOT
- Length: 90.31 mi (145.34 km)

Major junctions
- West end: US 101 in Astoria
- East end: OR 8 in Forest Grove

Location
- Country: United States
- State: Oregon
- Counties: Clatsop, Columbia, Washington

Highway system
- Oregon Highways; Interstate; US; State; Named; Scenic
← Highway 100	→ Highway 103
← OR 201	OR 202	→ OR 203

The Nehalem Highway No. 102 (see Oregon highways and routes) is a state highway in the U.S. state of Oregon that passes through the Nehalem River valley. It runs from U.S. Route 101 (US 101) in Astoria southeast to Oregon Route 8 (OR 8) in Forest Grove. Between Astoria and the Mist–Clatskanie Highway No. 110 in Mist, it is signed as Oregon Route 202 while the rest is signed as OR 47. A piece of the highway in Astoria, north of the Warrenton–Astoria Highway No. 105, is also US 101 Business.

== Route description ==
The western terminus of the Nehalem Highway No. 102 is a roundabout with US 101 in Astoria. Here, US 101 Business and OR 202 travel along the eastern shore of Youngs Bay, where US 101 Business splits away to the south, and the Youngs River. Soon after, it enters the valley of the Nehalem River, and continues southeast towards the community of Jewell. Leaving Jewell, it then continues east-northeast to the town of Mist, where OR 202 ends. The Nehalem Highway continues southeast from there, as OR 47.

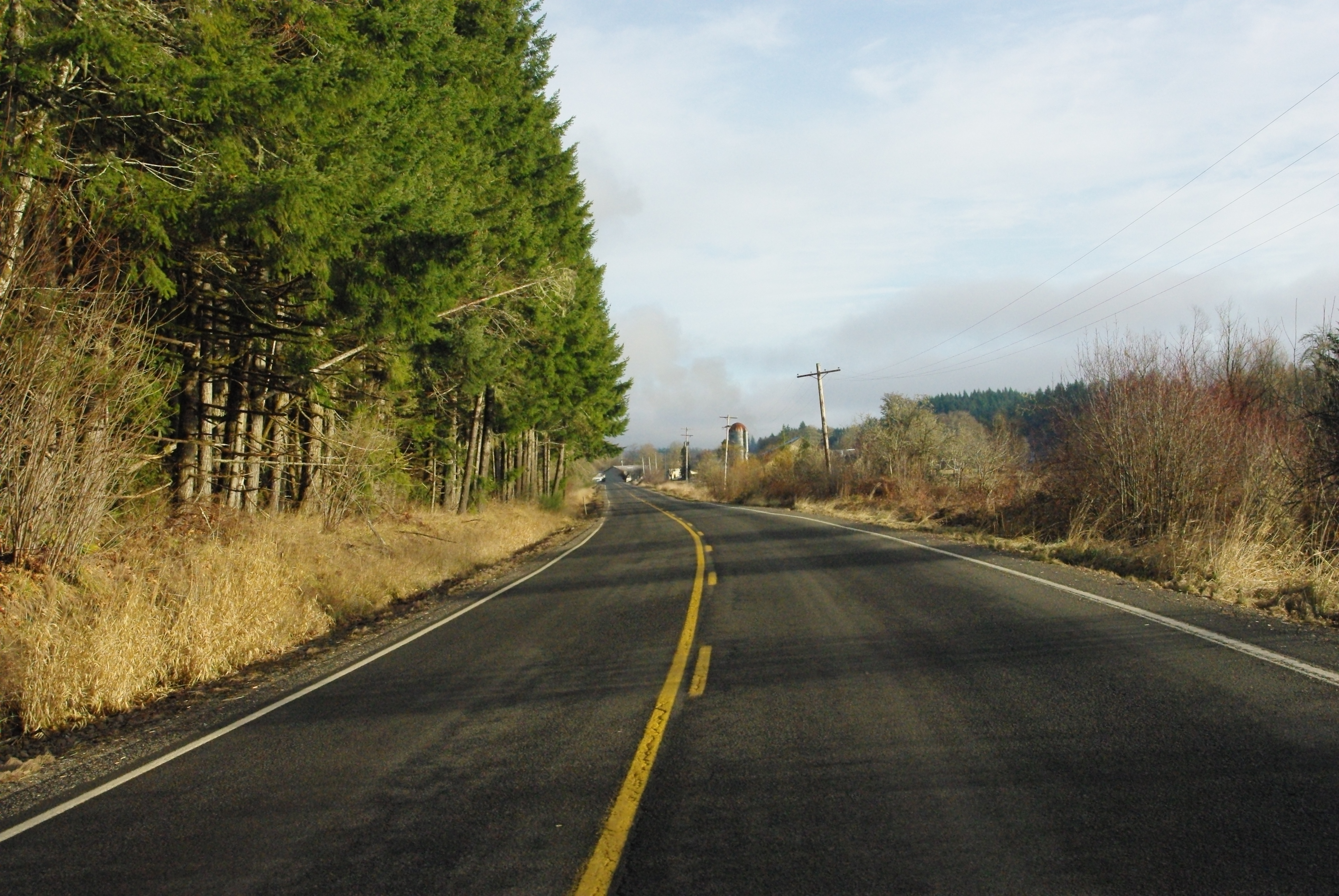
The highway near Mist

Though in the mountainous Northern Oregon Coast Range, the Nehalem Highway itself is a winding road, as it follows the banks of the Nehalem River from Jewell while passing through Vernonia and Pittsburg. Near Buxton, the highway meets US 26, which carries the Sunset Highway No. 47. The two highways run concurrently for about four miles (6.4 km). The Nehalem Highway and OR 47 split away from US 26 and the Sunset Highway and travels through the town of Banks. It ends at an intersection with OR 8, the Tualatin Valley Highway No. 29.

== History ==
In the early part of the 20th century, it followed the Nehalem River all the way to Timber, crossing the divide of the Northern Oregon Coast Range there and then going down Gales Creek to Forest Grove, instead of going down Dairy Creek as it has since about 1940.

== Major intersections ==
County	Location	mi	km	Destinations	Notes
Clatsop	Astoria	0.00	0.00	US 101 – Astoria, Warrenton, Seaside US 101 Bus. begins / OR 202 begins	Roundabout; western end of US 101 Business and OR 202 overlaps
Clatsop	Astoria	1.24	2.00	US 101 Bus. south – Warrenton, Seaside	Eastern end of US 101 Business overlap
Clatsop	Jewell	28.91	46.53	OR 103 south to US 26 – Elsie	
Columbia	Mist	45.85	73.79	OR 202 ends / OR 47 north – Clatskanie, Rainier	Eastern end of OR 202 overlap; western end of OR 47 overlap
Washington	Buxton	76.63	123.32	US 26 west – Seaside	Western end of US 26 overlap
Washington		80.50	129.55	US 26 east – North Plains, Portland	Eastern end of US 26 overlap
Washington	Banks	83.39	134.20	OR 6 – North Plains, Glenwood, Portland, Tillamook	Interchange
Washington	Forest Grove	90.31	145.34	OR 8 – Hillsboro OR 47 south – Yamhill	Eastern end of OR 47 overlap
1.000 mi = 1.609 km; 1.000 km = 0.621 mi: Concurrency terminus
