= Gasco Building =

Gasco Building may refer to:

- Failing Office Building, Portland, Oregon
- Portland Gas & Coke Building, Portland, Oregon
