= Birkenfeld, Oregon =

Unincorporated community in the state of Oregon, United States

- Unincorporated community
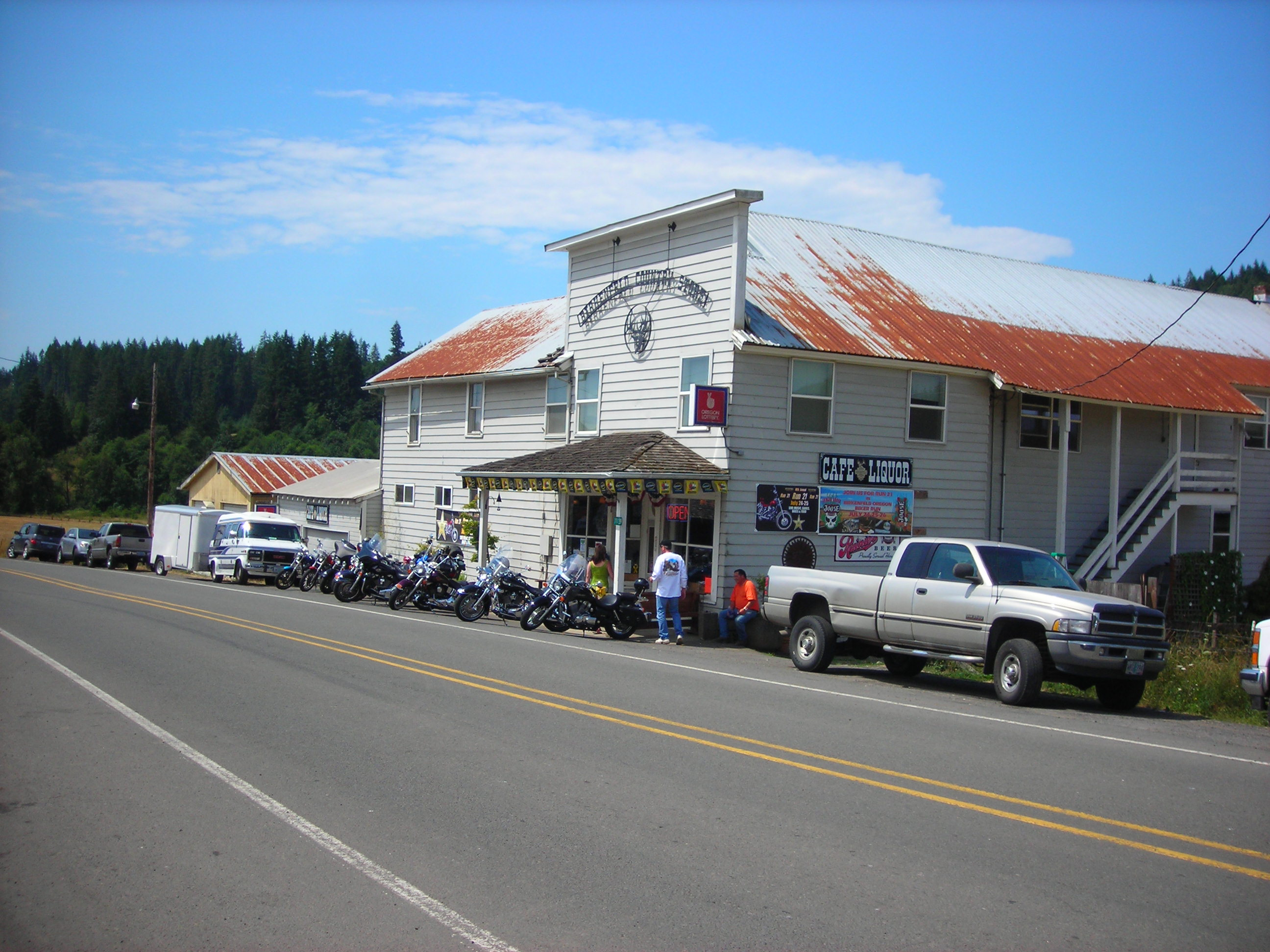
- The Birkenfeld Country Store

- Location within the state of Oregon Birkenfeld (the United States)
- Coordinates: 45°59′26″N 123°20′15″W
- Country: United States
- State: Oregon
- County: Columbia
- Elevation: 515 ft (157 m)

Population (2000)
  - Total: 840
- Time zone: UTC-8 (Pacific (PST))
  - Summer (DST): UTC-7 (PDT)
- Area codes: 503 and 971

Birkenfeld is an unincorporated community in Columbia County, Oregon, United States, in the Nehalem Valley on Oregon Route 202 between Jewell and Mist.

== History ==
German immigrant Anton Birkenfeld settled in the Nehalem Valley in 1886 and founded Birkenfeld in about 1910. Birkenfeld's post office was founded in 1916, bringing much-needed mail service on a more local basis. As of 2010, the Birkenfeld post office has been closed permanently. Although mail can still be addressed directly to the defunct post office, the community has a Clatskanie ZIP code, 97016 and all mail directed toward Birkenfeld is automatically redirected there.

As of the 1990s the community had a store, a café, a tavern, a garage, and a church.

== Geography ==
Located on the northwest of Oregon it has a latitude of 515 feet (157 meters) above sea level.

Degrees Minutes Seconds: Latitude: 45-59'26" N Longitude: 123-20'15" W Decimal Degrees: Latitude: 45.9906668 Longitude: -123.3376214

=== Climate ===
Birkenfeld has a warm-summer Mediterranean climate (Köppen Csb) with cool and cloudy winters, and warm, dry summers. This climate is characterized by having overcast, wet, and changing weather conditions in fall, winter, and spring, as Birkenfeld lies in the direct path of the stormy westerly flow, and mild and dry summers when the Pacific High reaches in northernmost point in mid summer.

According to the Köppen climate classification, Birkenfeld falls within the dry-summer temperate zone (Csb). with a USDA Plant Hardiness Zones between 8b and 9a. Other climate systems, such as the Trewartha climate classification, places it within the oceanic zone (Do), like much of the Pacific Northwest and Western Europe.

Winters are cool, cloudy, and rainy. The coldest month is December with an average daily high of 44.0 °F (6.7 °C), although overnight lows usually remain above freezing by a few degrees. Evening temperatures fall to or below freezing 33 nights per year on average, but very rarely to or below 18 °F (−8 °C).

Annual snowfall in Birkenfeld falls during the December-to-March time frame.

Summers in Birkenfeld are warm, occasionally hot, dry, and sunny, though the sunny warm weather is short lived from mid June through early September. The months of June, July, August and September account for a combined 5.4 inches (137 mm) of total rainfall – of the 54.7 in (1,389 mm) of the precipitation that falls throughout the year. The warmest months are July and August, with an average high temperature of 78.0 °F (25.6 °C). Because of its location 46 miles (74 km) to the coast, as well as the protective nature of the Oregon Coast Range to its west, Birkenfeld summers are less susceptible to the moderating influence of the nearby Pacific Ocean. Spring and fall can bring variable weather including warm fronts that send temperatures surging above 80 °F (27 °C) and cold snaps that plunge daytime temperatures into the 40s °F (4–9 °C). However, lengthy stretches of overcast days beginning in mid fall and continuing into mid spring are most common. Rain often falls as a light drizzle for several consecutive days at a time, contributing to 152 days on average with measurable (≥0.01 in or 0.25 mm) precipitation annually.

Climate data for Birkenfeld, Oregon
| Month | Jan | Feb | Mar | Apr | May | Jun | Jul | Aug | Sep | Oct | Nov | Dec | Year |
|---|---|---|---|---|---|---|---|---|---|---|---|---|---|
| Mean daily maximum °F (°C) | 46.0 (7.8) | 48.0 (8.9) | 52.0 (11.1) | 58.0 (14.4) | 65.0 (18.3) | 69.0 (20.6) | 78.0 (25.6) | 78.0 (25.6) | 72.0 (22.2) | 60.0 (15.6) | 50.0 (10.0) | 44.0 (6.7) | 60.0 (15.6) |
| Mean daily minimum °F (°C) | 37.0 (2.8) | 37.0 (2.8) | 38.0 (3.3) | 40.0 (4.4) | 46.0 (7.8) | 50.0 (10.0) | 54.0 (12.2) | 55.0 (12.8) | 52.0 (11.1) | 46.0 (7.8) | 41.0 (5.0) | 36.0 (2.2) | 44.3 (6.8) |
| Average precipitation inches (mm) | 8.2 (210) | 6.0 (150) | 6.2 (160) | 4.1 (100) | 2.6 (66) | 1.7 (43) | 0.6 (15) | 0.9 (23) | 2.2 (56) | 4.3 (110) | 8.6 (220) | 9.3 (240) | 54.7 (1,393) |
| Average snowfall inches (cm) | 1.8 (4.6) | 1.1 (2.8) | 0.3 (0.76) | 0 (0) | 0 (0) | 0 (0) | 0 (0) | 0 (0) | 0 (0) | 0 (0) | 0.3 (0.76) | 1.3 (3.3) | 4.8 (12.22) |
| Average precipitation days | 17 | 14 | 17 | 14 | 10 | 7 | 2 | 3 | 6 | 11 | 17 | 18 | 136 |
| Average snowy days | 1 | 0 | 0 | 0 | 0 | 0 | 0 | 0 | 0 | 0 | 0 | 0 | 1 |
Source: NOAA

== Demographics ==
Birkenfeld, Oregon has a population of 840.

The median household income in Birkenfeld, Oregon is $41,938. The median household income for the surrounding county is $47,577 compared to the national median of $50,013. The median age of people living in Birkenfeld is 43.2 years.
