= Pittsburg, Oregon =

Unincorporated community in the state of Oregon, United States

- Unincorporated community
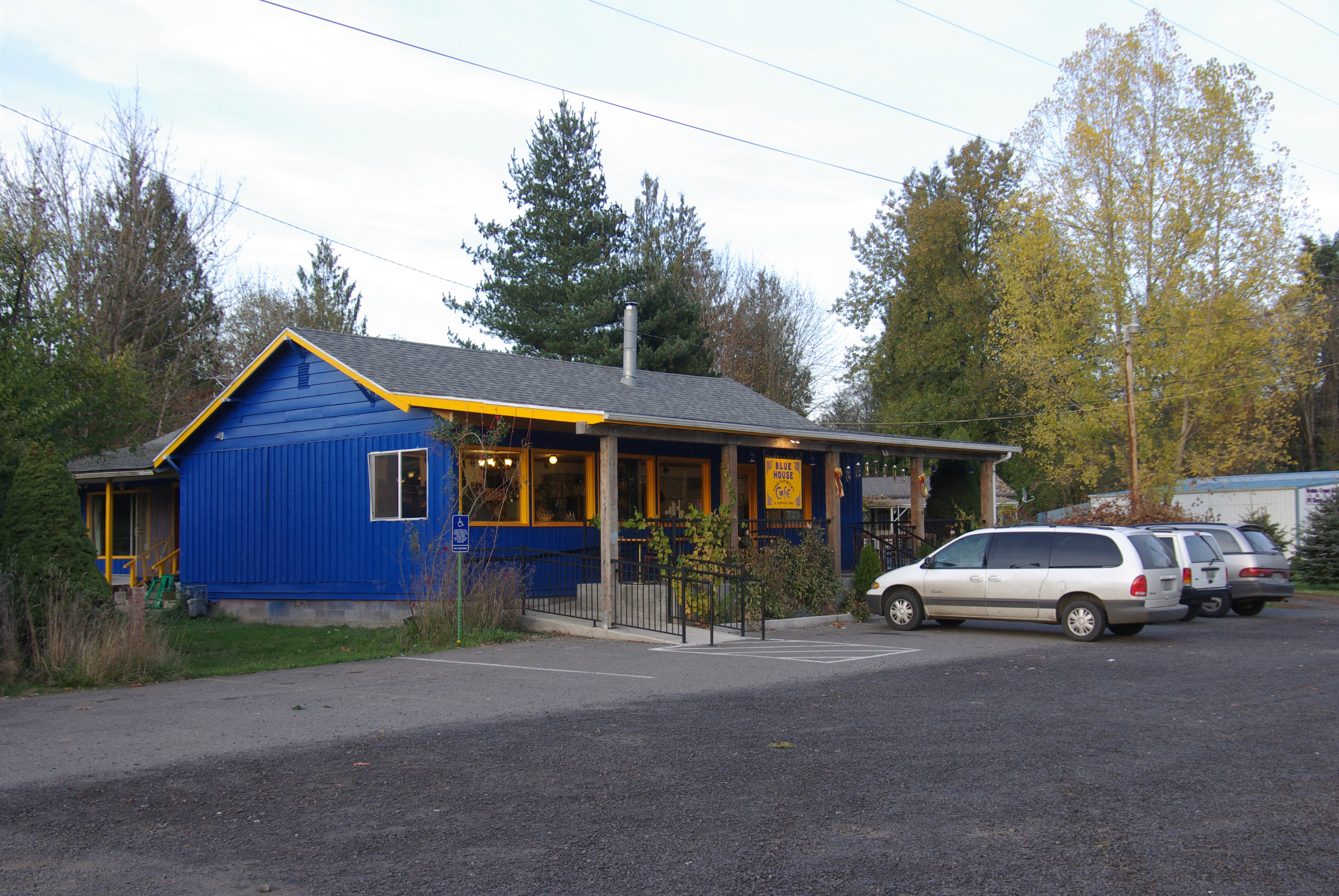
- Building in Pittsburg

- Location within the state of Oregon Pittsburg (the United States)
- Coordinates: 45°54′3″N 123°9′4″W
- Country: United States
- State: Oregon
- County: Columbia
- Elevation: 584 ft (178 m)
- Time zone: UTC-8 (Pacific (PST))
  - Summer (DST): UTC-7 (PDT)
- ZIP code: 97064
- Area codes: 503 and 971
- GNIS feature ID: 1125453

Pittsburg is an unincorporated community in Columbia County, Oregon, United States. Pittsburg is located on the Nehalem River near its confluence with the East Fork Nehalem River. The Scappoose-Vernonia road and the St. Helens-Pittsburg road join Oregon Route 47 near Pittsburg. Pittsburg's elevation is 584 feet (178 m).

Pittsburg was named by early area resident Peter Brous, who settled there in 1879 and built a sawmill and a gristmill. Brous named the community for Pittsburgh, Pennsylvania, having formerly lived in that state. The Oregon post office was established with the name "Pittsburgh" on April 17, 1879, with Brous as the postmaster. The name was changed to "Pittsburg" in 1892 and the post office was discontinued in 1908.
