= Jewell Meadows Wildlife Area =

Wildlife refuge in Oregon, US

- IUCN category V (protected landscape/seascape)
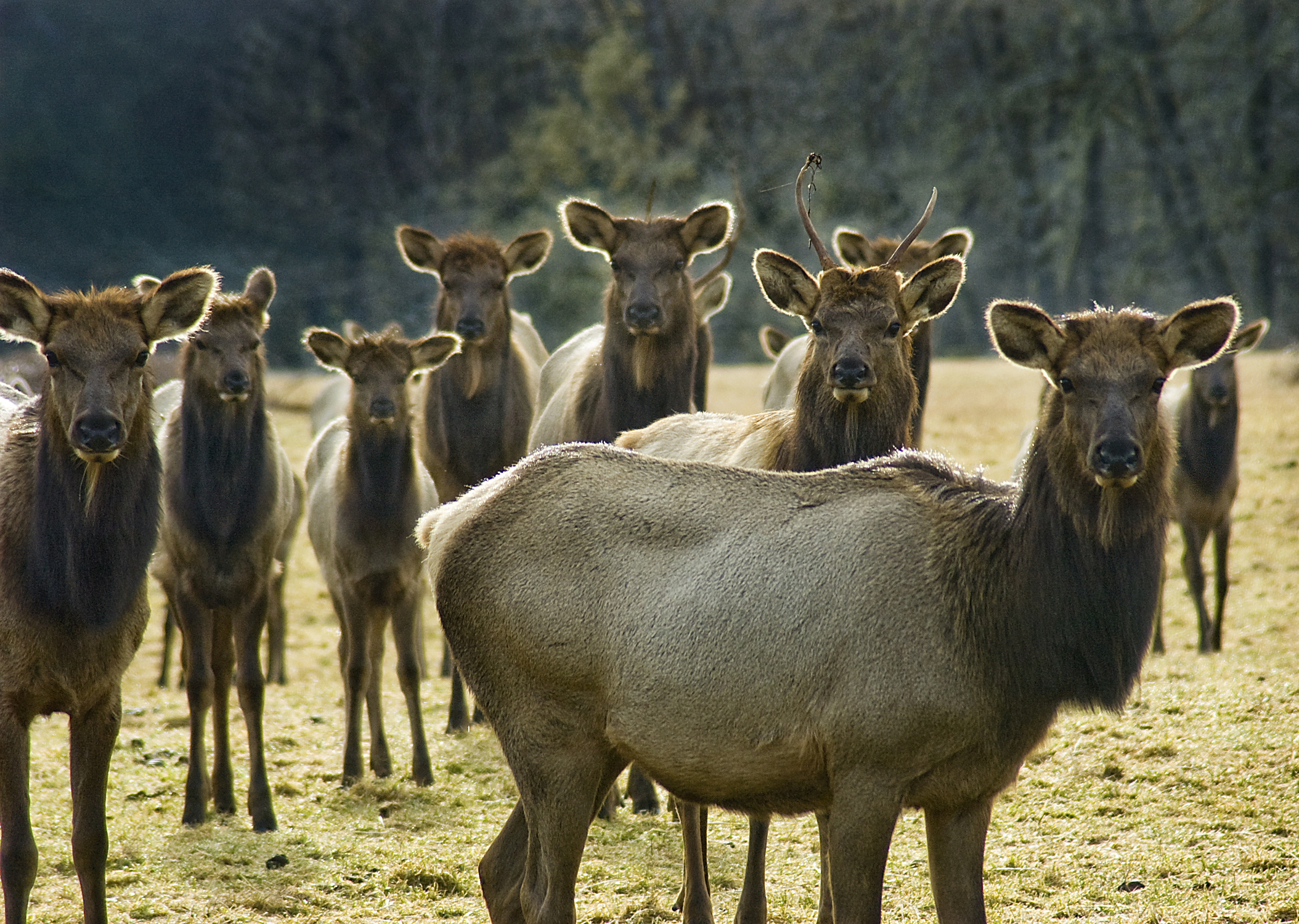
- Elk cows and calves at Oregon's Jewell Meadows Wildlife Area

- Location within Oregon
- Location: Oregon, United States
- Coordinates: 45.945°N 123.522°W
- Established: 1969
- Operator: Oregon Department of Fish and Wildlife
- Website: Jewell Meadows Wildlife Area

Jewell Meadows Wildlife Area is an American wildlife refuge located in northwest Oregon, near the community of Jewell. The area is designed to benefit native wildlife and to reduce the impact of wild animal populations on area properties. The area is 1,114 acres (451 ha). The refuge was 183 acres (74 ha) when the area was established in 1969.

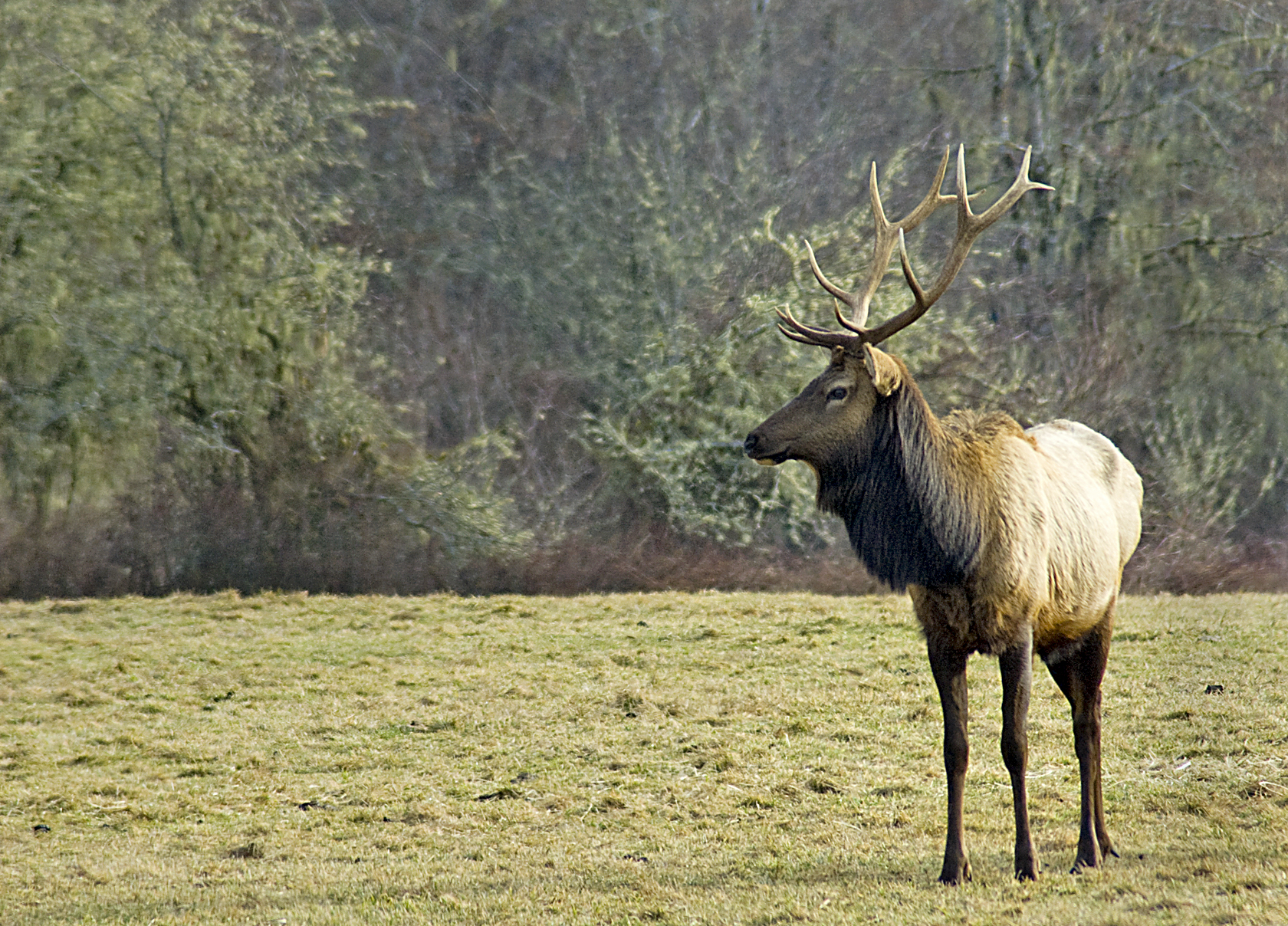
Bull elk at Jewell Meadows Wildlife Area

During the winter and spring months, up to 200 elk may be seen from an adjacent highway. Hunting is prohibited and there is no public access to the main meadow. There are parking areas and four viewing areas on site, along with some affiliated signage.

Bird watching is common all year with bird species varying with the time of year. Bald eagles, red-tailed hawks, many owl species and over 40 songbird species spend time in the area. Other wildlife includes coyotes, bobcats, black-tailed deer, river otters and beavers.

== See also ==
- Fishhawk Falls
