= Elsie, Oregon =

Unincorporated community in the state of Oregon, United States

- Unincorporated community
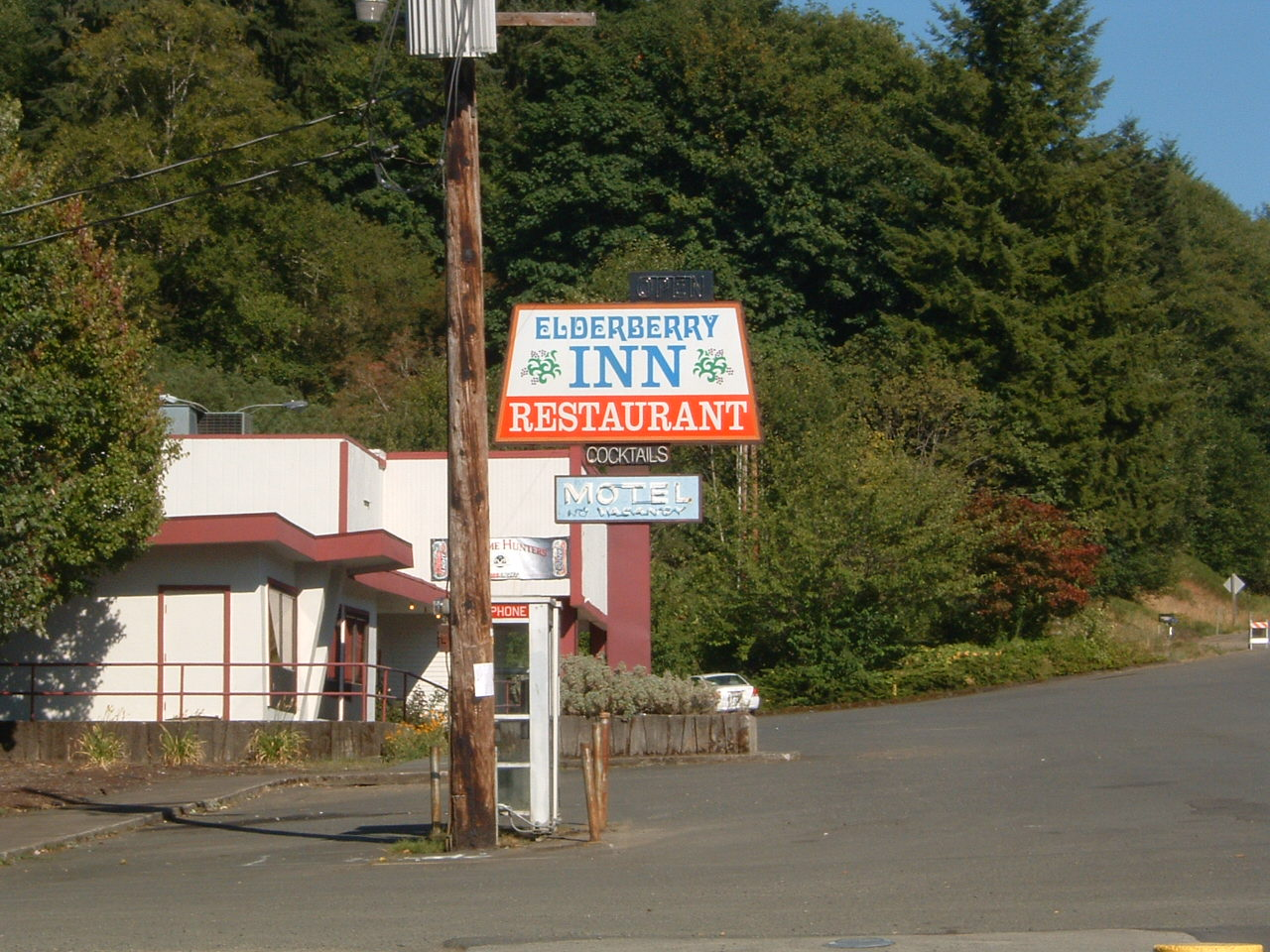
- Elderberry Inn

- Location within the state of Oregon Elsie (the United States)
- Coordinates: 45°51′56″N 123°35′41″W
- Country: United States
- State: Oregon
- County: Clatsop
- Elevation: 453 ft (138 m)
- Time zone: UTC-8 (Pacific (PST))
  - Summer (DST): UTC-7 (PDT)
- ZIP code: 97138
- Area codes: 503 and 971
- GNIS feature ID: 1136261

Elsie is an unincorporated community in Clatsop County, Oregon, United States. It is located in the Northern Oregon Coast Range, west of the junction of Oregon Route 103 and U.S. Route 26 where the roads cross the Nehalem River.

Elsie was named after Elsie Foster, who was a relative of George Gragg, the first postmaster. Elsie post office was established in 1892 and closed in 1943.

Camp 18 is a restaurant and logging museum in Elsie. The restaurant is built in the style of a log cabin, using local timber. The building includes an 85-foot ridge pole and front doors that weigh 500 pounds each.
