= NW Natural =

Publicly-traded utility based in Portland, Oregon

Coordinates: 45.524976°N 122.671999°W

- Formerly: Portland Gas Light Co.
- Type: Public
- Traded as: NYSE: NWN; S&P 600 Component
- Industry: Utility
- Founded: January 7, 1859; 167 years ago in Portland, Oregon Territory
- Headquarters: Portland, Oregon, United States
- Key people: David H. Anderson, President & CEO; Tod R. Hamachek, Chairman
- Products: Natural gas
- Revenue: ▲US$1.29 billion (2025)
- Net income: ▲US$113 million (2025)
- Number of employees: ▲1,214 (2023)
- Subsidiaries: NNG Financial Corporation; NW Natural Gas Storage LLC; NW Natural Water
- Website: www.nwnatural.com
- Footnotes; Financial data.

NW Natural, formerly Northwest Natural Gas Company, is an American publicly traded utility headquartered in Portland, Oregon, United States. Primarily a natural gas distributor, the company services residential, commercial, and industrial customers in Western Oregon and Southwest Washington in the Pacific Northwest. NW Natural also owns water utilities. Founded in 1859, the company has approximately 800,000 customers and revenues of over $1 billion annually.

== History ==
Portland Gas Light Company began as the first gas company in the Pacific Northwest in 1859, based on a perpetual charter by the territorial government. The territorial government granted the charter in January 1859, only a month before Oregon became a state on February 14, at which time the Oregon Constitution became effective. The Constitution would not have allowed this perpetual franchise had the Constitution been in effect at the time the charter was granted. The company was started by H.C. Leonard and Henry D. Green, "colorful pioneers" who knew each other in New York, met again in San Francisco, and started a general store in Astoria in 1850.

Moving to Portland in 1852, Green and Leonard built the first shipping dock in Portland. They also operated as agents for Pacific Mail Steamship Company and exported goods to the Hawaiian Islands and Asia. Their first coal gasification plant at Flanders and the waterfront operated on coal from Vancouver Island. Gas began flowing in 1859, and the first gas lights were in a section of downtown Portland beginning June 1, 1860 and supplied 49 customers. They incorporated as the Portland Gas Light Company in 1862 and purchased the Portland Water Company franchise. They also created the East Portland Gas Light Company in 1882, creating a plant at East Second and Ankeny.

Green died in 1885, and Leonard sold the Portland Water Company franchise to the city in December 1886. The gas business was sold to bankers C.F. Adams and Abbot Low Mills in August 1892 for a reported $850,000. Adams and Mills reincorporated as the Portland Gas Company and bought three other franchises, including the East Portland Gas Light Company. They connected east and west Portland with a 10-inch gas main under the Willamette and then dismantled the eastern gas plant.

In 1913, the company was sold to the American Power & Light Company for $3.5 million and was renamed the Portland Gas and Coke Company. American Power was a subsidiary of the Electric Bond and Share Company of New York (EBASCO). EBASCO was the holding company for small utilities owned by General Electric. Using American Power's financing, Portland Gas supported the creation of St. Johns Gas Company in 1909, Clackamas County Gas Company in 1913, and acquired both companies in 1915.

In the early days of the company, gas was manufactured from coal or oil in local plants. This process ended with the arrival of natural gas to the region in the 1950s, and the company closed its last gas plant in 1957.

In 1958, the company changed its name to Northwest Natural Gas Company. During the 1960s, 1970s, and 1980s, the company continued to grow and expand its service area beyond Portland and the Willamette Valley. By the end of 1989, the company had grown to serve over 300,000 residential customers. The company's name was changed again, from Northwest Natural Gas Company to NW Natural in 1997.

NW Natural moved from the NASDAQ stock market to a listing on the New York Stock Exchange under the symbol NWN in 2000. NW Natural attempted to purchase Portland General Electric (PGE), a Portland-based electricity utility, for nearly $3 billion beginning in October 2001 from Enron. Due to issues including the bankruptcy of PGE parent Enron, the proposed merger was abandoned in May 2002. In 2005, Business Ethics magazine named NW Natural to its list of 100 Best Corporate Citizens for the fifth year in a row, ranking 47th.

In 2003, NW Natural donated $125,000 to create the NW Natural/Dick Reiten Leadership Fund, a charitable fund at the Oregon Community Foundation established in honor retiring CEO Richard G. Reiten. On July 10, 2003, NW Natural Gas Company and Coos County broke ground for the county's natural gas transmission line and NW Natural's local distribution system in Coos Bay.

In 2007, NW Natural announced plans to construct a new pipeline for delivery of natural gas, and announced a rate cut for the first time in six years.

Starting in 2018, NW Natural began acquiring water utilities.

== Services ==
NW Natural is Oregon’s largest natural gas utility. It serves customers along the Oregon Coast, in the Willamette Valley, the Columbia River Gorge, and the Portland metropolitan area. The company operates an underground natural gas storage facility near Mist, Oregon, in the Northern Oregon Coast Range utilizing depleted gas wells, as well as a facility near Fresno, California. These former wells allow the company to purchase the gas when prices are lower and store until needed during peak consumption times during the winter.

== Environmental issues ==
In 2005, the company began removing tar from the site of a former plant that had polluted the Willamette River and was later fined for actions related to that clean-up.

NW Natural had set a goal of delivering 5% renewable natural gas (RNG) by 2024, but only acquired less than 1%, largely sourced as credits for RNG purchased in Nebraska and other states. The company had claimed it could reduce carbon emissions with RNG with a greenwashing marketing and lobbying campaign called "Less We Can" while opposing electrification efforts to reduce gas use.

In October 2024, NW Natural was added a defendant in a $50 billion lawsuit brought by officials in Multnomah County against fossil fuel companies including Exxon and Shell, alleging that the companies knew that burning natural gas contributed to climate change but deceived customers about the risks and continued "rapaciously” selling fossil fuel products, implicating the companies in the deaths of at least 69 Multnomah County residents in a heat wave in 2021.

== Financial results ==
Financial figures for the company, in millions of US dollars.

Year	Revenue	Net Income
2004:	$707.6	$50.6
2005:	$910.5	$58.1
2006:	$1,013.2	$63.4
2007:	$1,033.2	$74.5
2008:	$1,037.9	$69.5
2009:	$1,012.7	$75.1
2010:	$812.1	$72.7
2011:	$848.8	$63.9

On September 26, 2003, Fitch Ratings affirmed outstanding ratings of Northwest Natural Gas Co. (NWN) as follows: first mortgage bonds and secured medium-term notes at 'A'; senior unsecured debt, convertible debentures and preferred stock at 'A−'; and commercial paper at 'F1'.

== See also ==
- List of companies based in Oregon
- Portland Gas & Coke Building
