= Jewell Junction, Oregon =

Unincorporated community in the state of Oregon, United States

Coordinates: 45.859000°N 123.554292°W

Jewell Junction is a highway junction and unincorporated community in Clatsop County, Oregon, United States. It is located at the intersection of U.S. Route 26 and Oregon Route 103, approximately nine miles southwest of Jewell.
