= Fishhawk Falls =

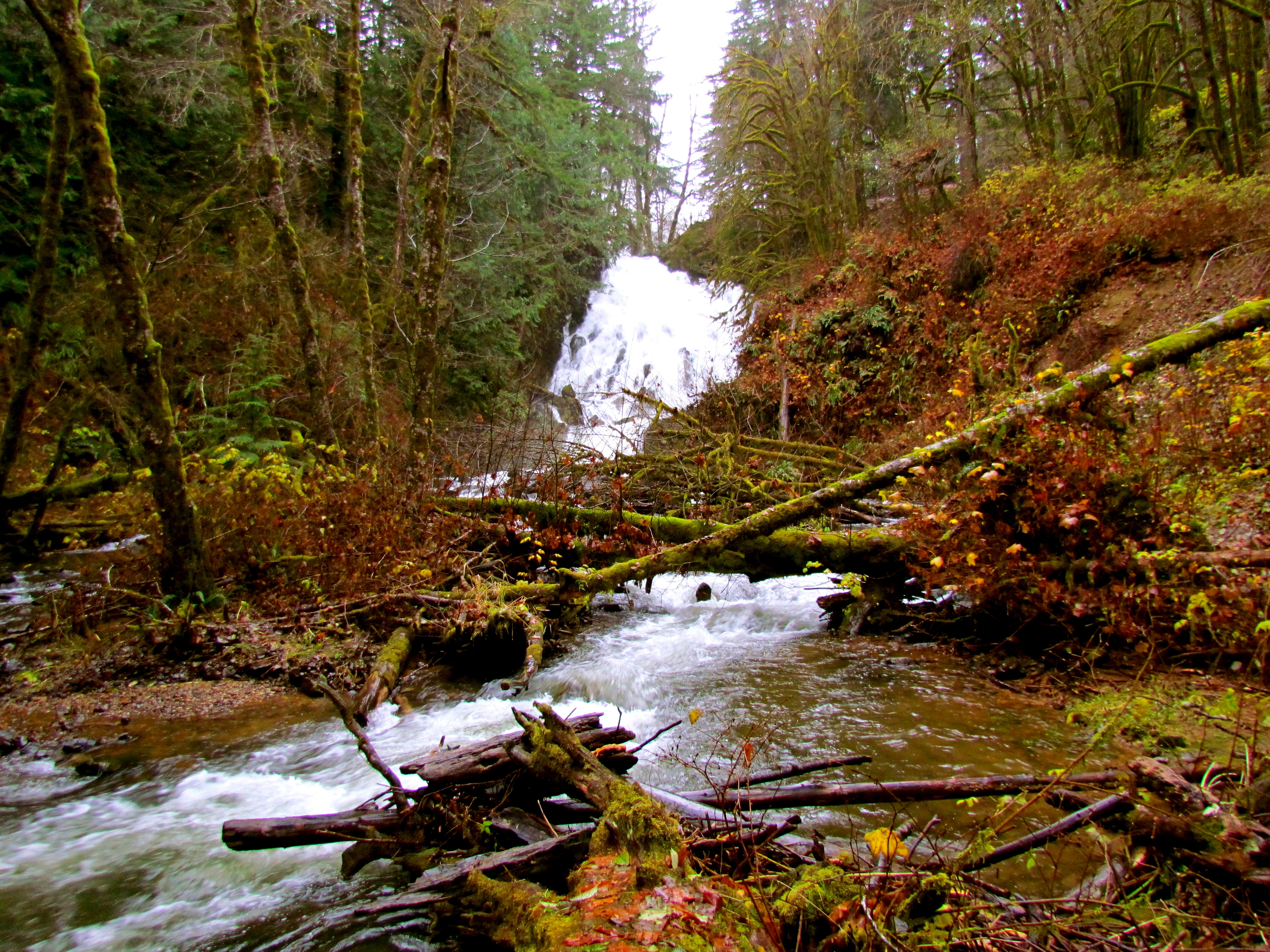
- Fishhawk Falls
- Interactive map of Fishhawk Falls
- Location: Lee Wooden County Park
- Coordinates: 45.95833°N 123.58361°W
- Type: Steep Veiling Cascade
- Elevation: 772 ft (235 m)
- Total height: 72 ft (22 m)
- Average flow rate: 20 cu ft/s (0.57 m^{3}/s)

Fishhawk Falls, is a waterfall located along the Fishhawk Creek in Clatsop County, in the U.S. state of Oregon. It totals 72 feet fall in one wide cascade and is the centerpiece attraction of the Lee Wooden Fishhawk Falls trailhead and Recreation Site. Fishhawk Falls is located a mile from the Jewell Meadows Wildlife Area off of Highway 202 between Jewell and Astoria.

The Fishhawk Falls runs over exposed stacked basalt columns making a dike that is of identical composition to the Columbia River basalt. It forms part of a basalt flow, like those at Otter Rock and Hug Point, that rank among the longest on earth, approximately 300 miles from eastern Oregon and Washington.

== See also ==
- List of waterfalls in Oregon
