= Dairy Creek (Oregon) =

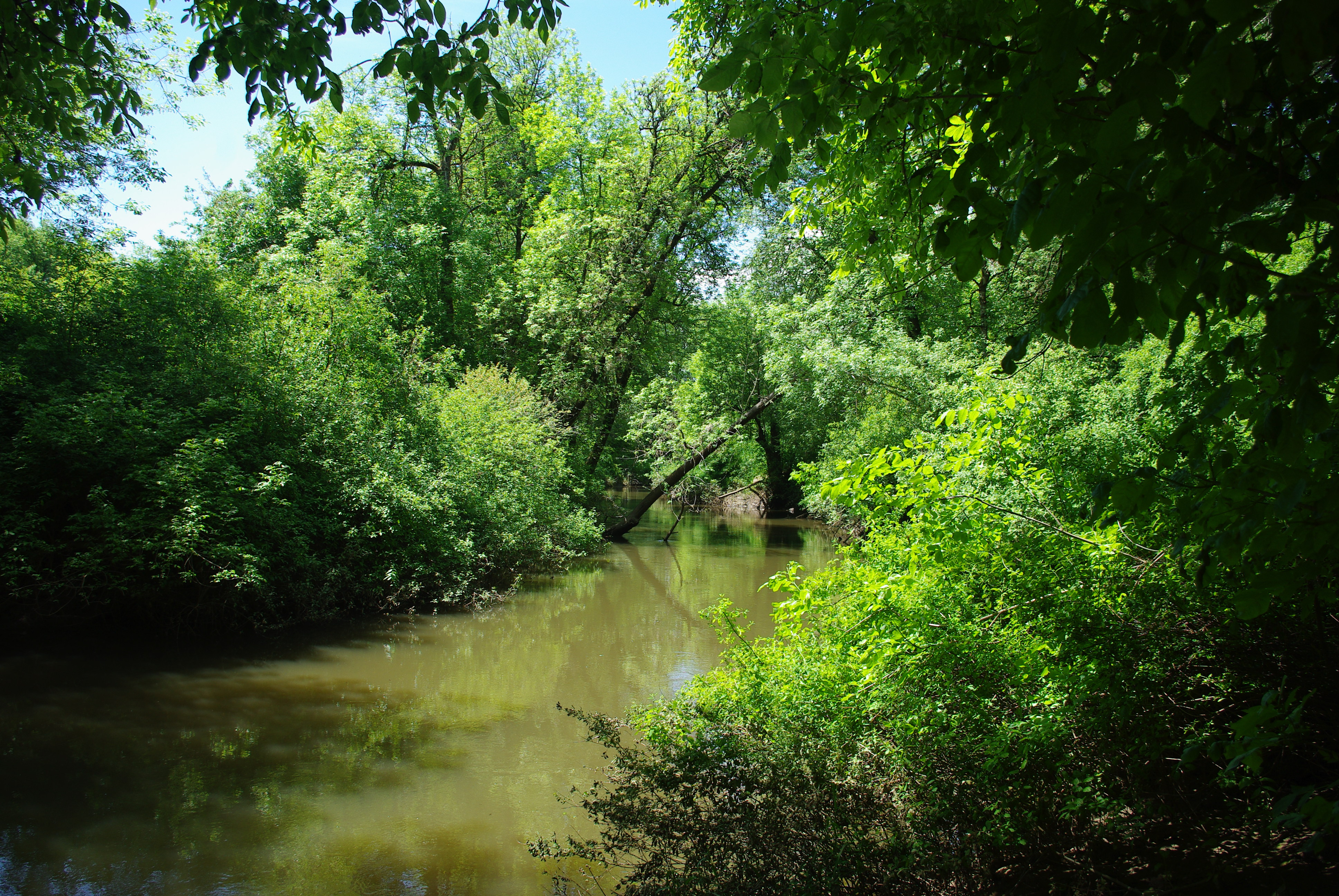
- Dairy Creek just south of the Tualatin Valley Highway

- Location of the mouth of Dairy Creek in Oregon
- Etymology: Probably first used by Hudson's Bay Company employees who ran a dairy near the creek prior to 1840.

Location
- Country: United States
- State: Oregon
- County: Washington

Physical characteristics
- Source: Confluence of East Fork Dairy Creek and West Fork Dairy Creek
  - location: near Schefflin, Washington County, Oregon
  - coordinates: 45°34′11″N 123°04′22″W
  - elevation: 151 ft (46 m)
- Mouth: Tualatin River
  - location: near Hillsboro, Washington County, Oregon
  - coordinates: 45°30′06″N 122°59′43″W
  - elevation: 128 ft (39 m)
- Length: 10.55 mi (16.98 km)
- Basin size: 226 sq mi (590 km^{2})
- Discharge
  - location: East Fork Dairy Creek, 12.3 miles (19.8 km) above confluence with West Fork Dairy Creek
  - average: 76.9 cu ft/s (2.18 m^{3}/s)
  - minimum: 6.9 cu ft/s (0.20 m^{3}/s)
  - maximum: 1,580 cu ft/s (45 m^{3}/s)

Dairy Creek is a 10.55-mile (16.98 km) tributary of the Tualatin River in the U.S. state of Oregon. It begins at the confluence of its east and west forks near the unincorporated community of Schefflin and meanders southeast across the Tualatin Valley to the Tualatin River near Hillsboro, in Washington County. East Fork Dairy Creek begins at 45.788446°N 123.041498°W in Columbia County, slightly north of its border with Washington County, and flows generally south for 22 miles (35 km). West Fork Dairy Creek, also about 22 miles (35 km) long, forms at 45.7553899°N 123.178168°W, near the unincorporated community of Tophill, and flows generally southeast. Before railroads displaced river boats on the Tualatin, some steamships also worked the lower section of Dairy Creek, with plans to go as far up stream as Centerville.

== Course ==
=== Main stem ===
The roughly 10.6-mile (17.1 km) main stem of Dairy Creek begins at 45.569837°N 123.072885°W at the confluence of its east and west forks. Flowing southeast, it receives Council Creek from the right 3.5 miles (5.6 km) from the mouth and McKay Creek from the left less than 1 mile (1.6 km) later. It passes under Oregon Route 8 (Tualatin Valley Highway) west of Hillsboro about 2 miles (3 km) from the mouth before entering the Tualatin River about 45 miles (72 km) from its confluence with the Willamette River.

=== West Fork ===
For roughly its first 6 miles (10 km), West Fork Dairy Creek flows south from near Tophill in northwestern Washington County. It passes under Oregon Route 47 twice, receives Cummings Creek from the right and Williams Creek from the left, and passes slightly west of Buxton 16 miles (26 km) from the main stem. Shortly thereafter, it crosses under U.S. Route 26 (Sunset Highway) and turns southeast. Running parallel to and south of Route 26 and the concurrent Route 47 for about 1 mile (2 km), it receives Burgholzer Creek from the right and Mendenhall Creek from the left, before again passing under Route 26, still concurrent with Route 47. Flowing parallel to and north of the highway for about another 5 miles (8 km), West Fork Dairy Creek receives Whitcher Creek from the left, Kuder Creek from the right, and Garrigus Creek from the left before flowing south under Route 26 for the third and last time 9.3 miles (15.0 km) from the confluence of the east and west forks.

The west fork passes under Route 47, no longer concurrent with Route 26, 7.7 miles (12.4 km) from the confluence. Shortly thereafter, the stream flows by Banks, which lies to its left. Below Banks, the stream receives Cedar Canyon Creek from the right, passes under Oregon Route 6 at 6.2 miles (10.0 km) from the confluence, turns east about 3 miles (4.8 km) later and flows under Route 47 again. It receives Lousignont Canal from the right about 2 miles (3 km) from the confluence before joining the East Fork Dairy Fork to form the main stem.

=== East Fork ===
From its headwaters, East Fork Dairy Creek flows south for less than 1 mile (1.6 km) through Columbia County before entering Washington County 21.3 miles (34.3 km) from its confluence with the west fork. Over its next 10 miles (16 km), it receives Campbell Creek and Roundy Creek, both from the right, Panther Creek and Rock Creek, both from the left, Denny Creek from the right, Plentywater Creek and Meadow Brook Creek, both from the left, and Murtaugh Creek and Big Canyon, both from the right. At 12.3 miles (19.8 km) from the confluence, the stream passes United States Geological Survey (USGS) gauge 14205400. East Fork Dairy Creek flows under U.S. Route 26 about 6 miles (10 km) later. About 3 miles (5 km) downstream from Route 26, it receives Bledsoe Creek from the right before joining West Fork Dairy Creek to form the main stem.

=== Discharge ===
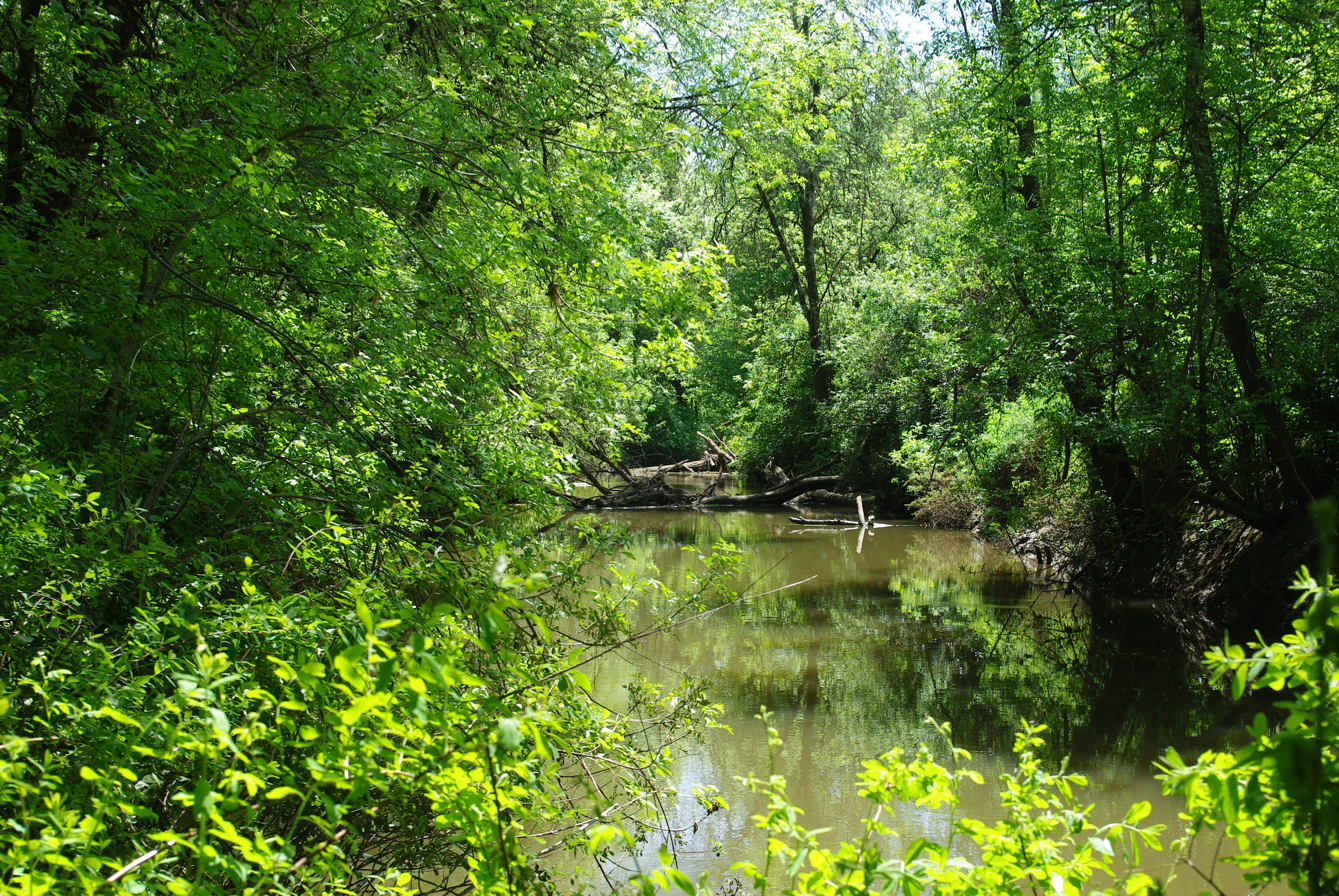
Creek at Dairy Creek Park in Hillsboro

The USGS monitors the flow of East Fork Dairy Creek at a station near the unincorporated community of Meacham Corner, 12.3 miles (19.8 km) from the confluence with the west fork and about 23 miles (37 km) from the mouth of Dairy Creek. The average flow at this station is 76.9 cubic feet per second (2.18 m^{3}/s). This is from a drainage area of 33.8 square miles (87.5 km^{2}), about 15 percent of the total Dairy Creek watershed. The maximum flow recorded there was 1,580 cubic feet per second (45 m^{3}/s) in January 2003, and the minimum flow was 6.9 cubic feet per second (0.20 m^{3}/s) in September 2007.

== See also ==
- List of rivers of Oregon
