= Portland Gas & Coke Building =

Former building in Portland, Oregon, U.S.

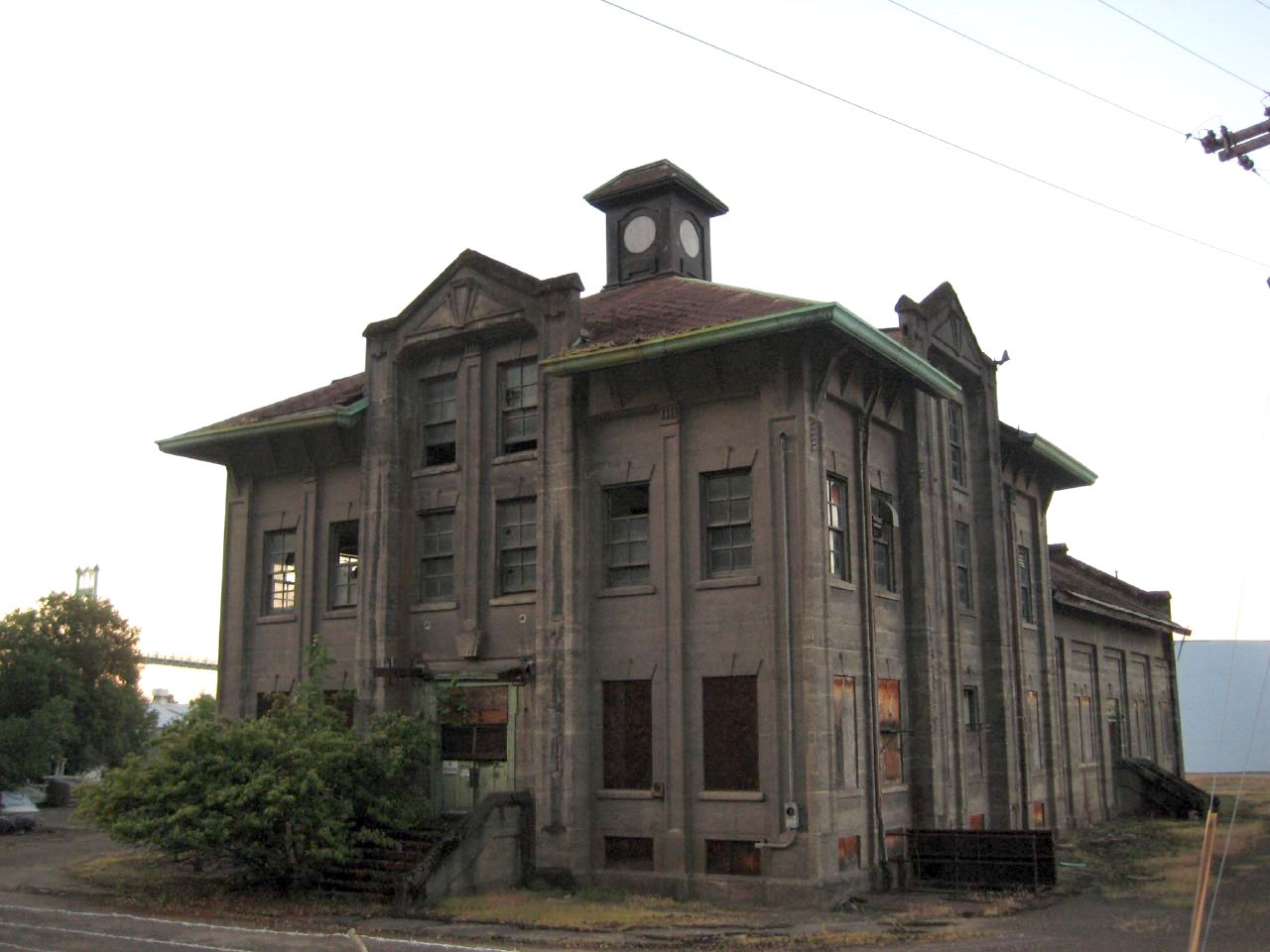
- The building's exterior in 2007
- Interactive map of the Portland Gas & Coke Building area
- Alternative names: Gas and Coke Building, Gasco Building

General information
- Status: Demolished
- Architectural style: Gothic Revival
- Location: Portland, Oregon, United States
- Coordinates: 45.579661°N 122.762329°W
- Completed: 1913
- Demolished: 2015
- Owner: NW Natural

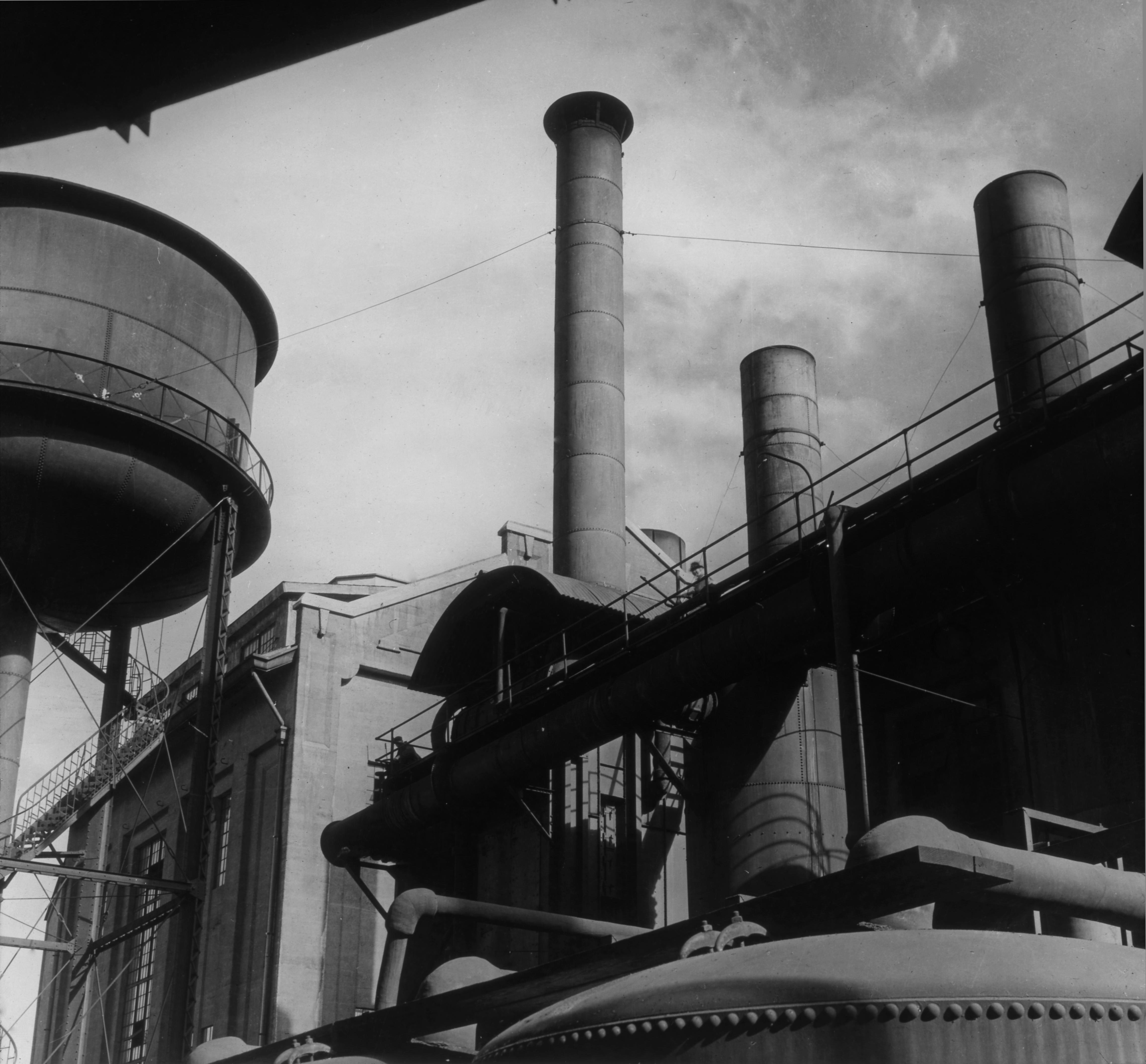
Photograph from the OSU Special Collections & Archives

The Portland Gas & Coke Building, also known as the Gas and Coke Building and Gasco Building, was an administrative building located in northwest Portland, Oregon, United States. It was constructed by Portland Gas & Coke in 1913 as part of a manufacturing plant, in which the company coked gas and fuel from coal. The building was abandoned in 1957 due to contamination issues and had remained vacant ever since. Despite attempts of various groups and individuals to preserve the historic building, demolition began on September 12, 2015, with the project completed in November 2015.

== Description ==
The Portland Gas & Coke Building was an administrative building located along U.S. Route 30, near the St. Johns Bridge and the Willamette River in Portland's Northwest Industrial area. The building was designed in the Gothic architectural style.

== History ==
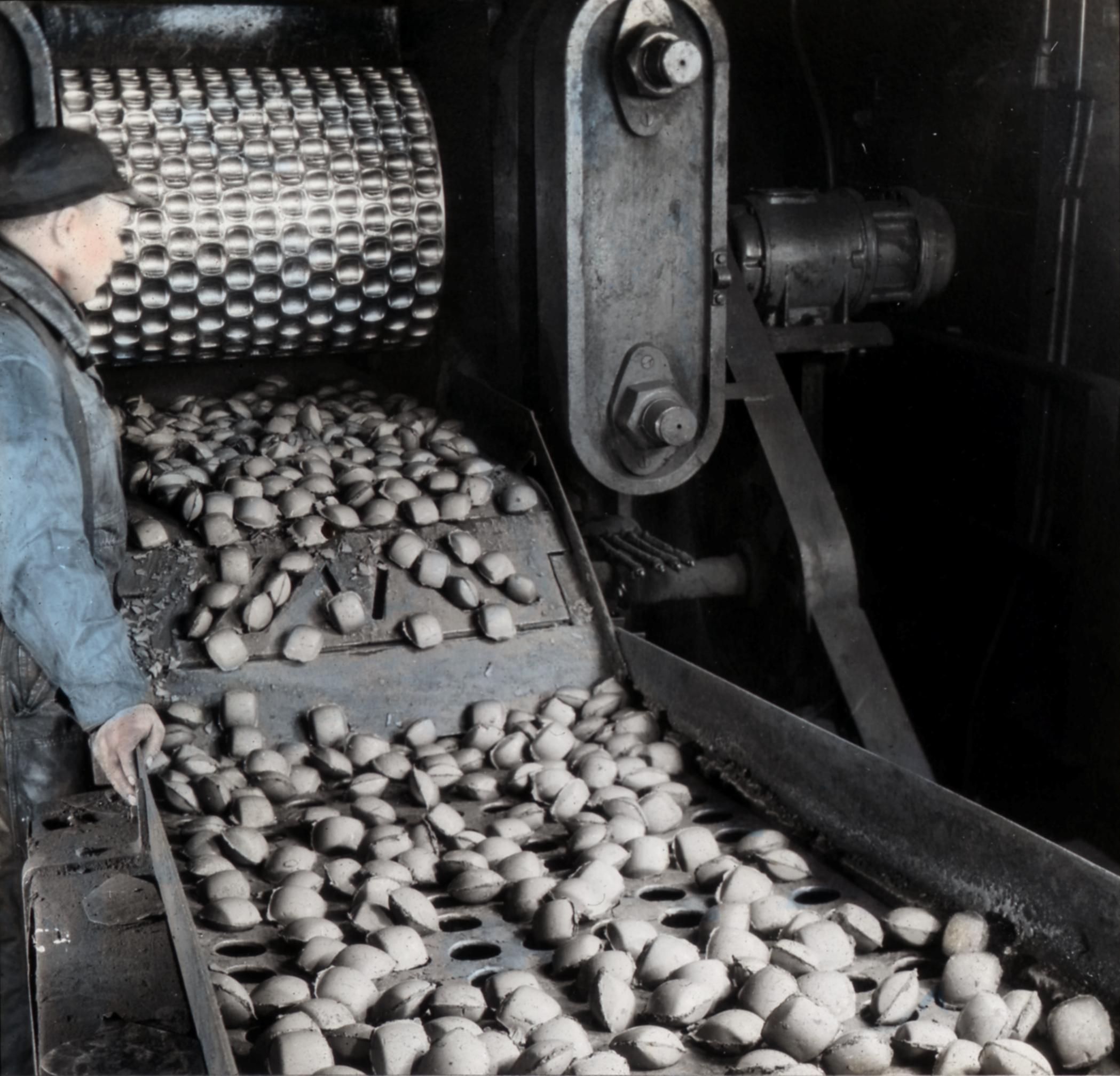
Photograph from the OSU Special Collections & Archives

The building was constructed by Portland Gas & Coke (now known as NW Natural, formerly Northwest Natural Gas Company) in 1913, as part of a plant to manufacture gas from oil. With the arrival of natural gas in the 1950s, the company closed the plant and the administrative building in 1958. The building was the plant's last remaining structure and it remained vacant until it was demolished in 2015. The building was listed on Portland's Historic Resource Inventory until NW Natural's removal request in August, 2012. The company announced demolition plans in December 2013 due to a "federally mandated cleanup effort in the area". NW Natural outlined the following concerns with the structure on their website:

Unfortunately, time has taken its toll on the building. It is extremely unsafe and structurally unsound. It also is contaminated with asbestos, lead and other material. Additionally, it sits on contaminated property that we are legally required to cleanup [sic] and is adjacent to a federal Superfund site. Further, it is zoned industrial and is located between two of our company's secure operations – a water treatment plant and a natural gas storage operation.

=== Demolition ===
A community group called Save the Portland GasCo Building attempted to raise $2 million to preserve the building, but their efforts were unsuccessful and resulted in only $4,000 from T-shirt sales. After learning of NW Natural's plans to proceed with the demolition, the historical preservation group's leader made plans to rally supporters at Skyline Tavern and said, "Portland is moving so fast these days—we're ripping out old Portland, and this is one of the last icons. This would be a relic that points to Portland's past. We call it an industrial cathedral." The group also confirmed plans to fly drones over the building to record footage for preservation and to stream video of its demolition via a 24/7 "GASCO cam". Architecture critic Brian Libby said of the building's demolition, "Shame on them, and shame on all of us."

NW Natural began demolition of the building in September, 2015; the process began with four to five weeks of stripping the interior before tearing down the exterior. According to the company, many requests were received to photograph both the interior and exterior of the dilapidated building, but all were declined due to its hazardous condition. Professional photographs of the structure were displayed on the NW Natural website. The demolition of the Gasco building was completed in November, 2015.

== In popular culture ==
The Gas & Coke Building is featured on the cover of Colin Meloy's 2012 novel, Under Wildwood. Meloy was also a supporter of the preservation efforts for the building.
