= Mist, Oregon =

Unincorporated community in the state of Oregon, United States

- Unincorporated community
- Location within the state of Oregon Mist (the United States)
- Coordinates: 45°59′47″N 123°15′19″W
- Country: United States
- State: Oregon
- County: Columbia
- Time zone: UTC-8 (Pacific (PST))
  - Summer (DST): UTC-7 (PDT)
- ZIP code: 97016
- Area codes: 503 and 971

Mist is an unincorporated community in Columbia County, Oregon, United States. Formerly called Riverside, the place was renamed in 1888 for the atmospheric conditions of the Nehalem Valley. The first land claims in the area had been made circa 1870. The original Riverside post office was closed in 1975.

== Background ==
On July 6, 2001, the Mist store, which was built in 1874, caught fire and was destroyed. Until then, it was the oldest continuously operating business in Oregon, offering food and hardware and displaying historic newspaper clippings and antique logging equipment on the walls.

Mist is a crossroads community where Oregon Route 47 turns north to Clatskanie, and a pioneer trail (Burn Road) crossed the Nehalem River and went south to Vernonia. It is the eastern terminus of Oregon Route 202. The Nehalem River valley widens between Mist and Jewell and was favored by the Native American tribes of the area for hunting; it was later favored by early European American settlers for agriculture. Although the area is now sparsely settled, it is notable for having the largest operating sawmill in Columbia County and also geological conditions lending themselves to natural gas storage. Mist contains one of the very few, and therefore very valuable, natural gas storage areas in the Pacific Northwest. It operates unobtrusively on a hill near Mist. It is controlled by NW Natural (formerly Northwest Natural Gas) and is connected by several pipelines, including a 16-inch (410 mm) and a 24-inch (610 mm) pipeline along the Nehalem Highway.

Earlier in the 20th century, Mist had a logging camp next to a railroad used by the Kerry Timber and Logging Company. The remains of the camp were discovered in 2008 and 2009. Though still important in terms of logging, the population today is sparse, and there is no longer a railroad.

== Gallery ==
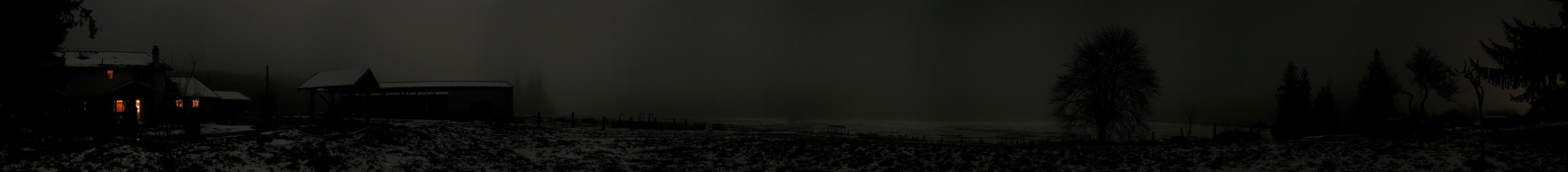
Panorama of a snowy night in Mist, taken early 2006.
