= Jewell, Oregon =

Unincorporated community in Clatsop County, Oregon, United States

- Unincorporated community
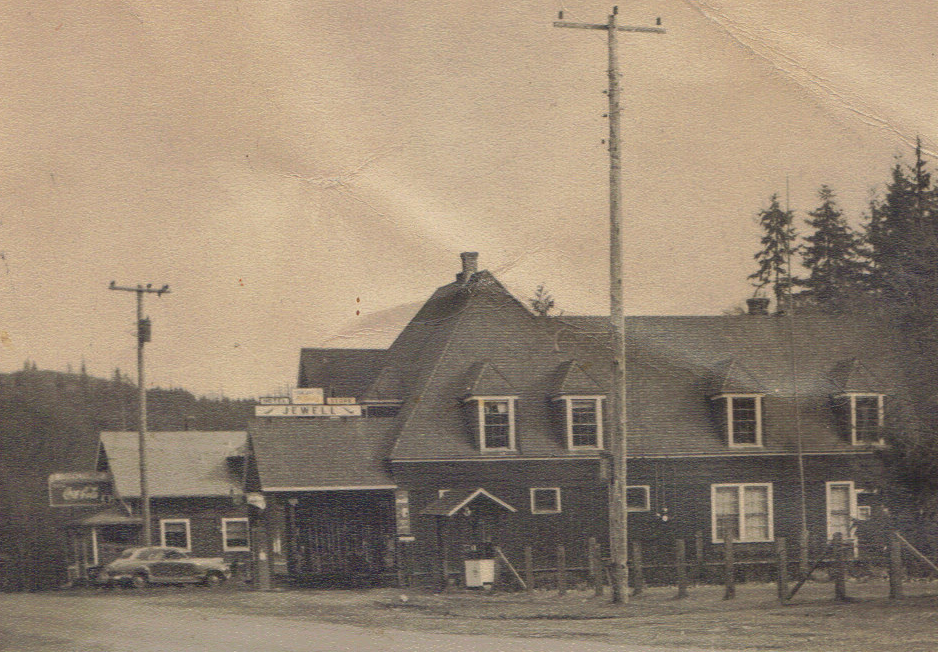
- The Jewell Hotel & Store, which burned at an unknown date. A pool hall can be seen in the distance on the left.

- Location within the state of Oregon
- Coordinates: 45°56′04″N 123°30′14″W
- Country: United States
- State: Oregon
- County: Clatsop
- Named for: Marshall Jewell

Area
  - Total: 299.8 sq mi (776.5 km^{2})
- Elevation: 463 ft (141 m)

Population (2007)
  - Total: 994
  - Density: 3.32/sq mi (1.28/km^{2})
- Time zone: UTC-8 (Pacific (PST))
  - Summer (DST): UTC-7 (PDT)
- ZIP code: 97138
- Area codes: 503 and 971
- GNIS feature ID: 1136421

Jewell is an unincorporated community in Clatsop County, Oregon, United States. The logging community is located at the junction of Oregon Route 103 and Oregon Route 202, near the Nehalem River.

== History ==
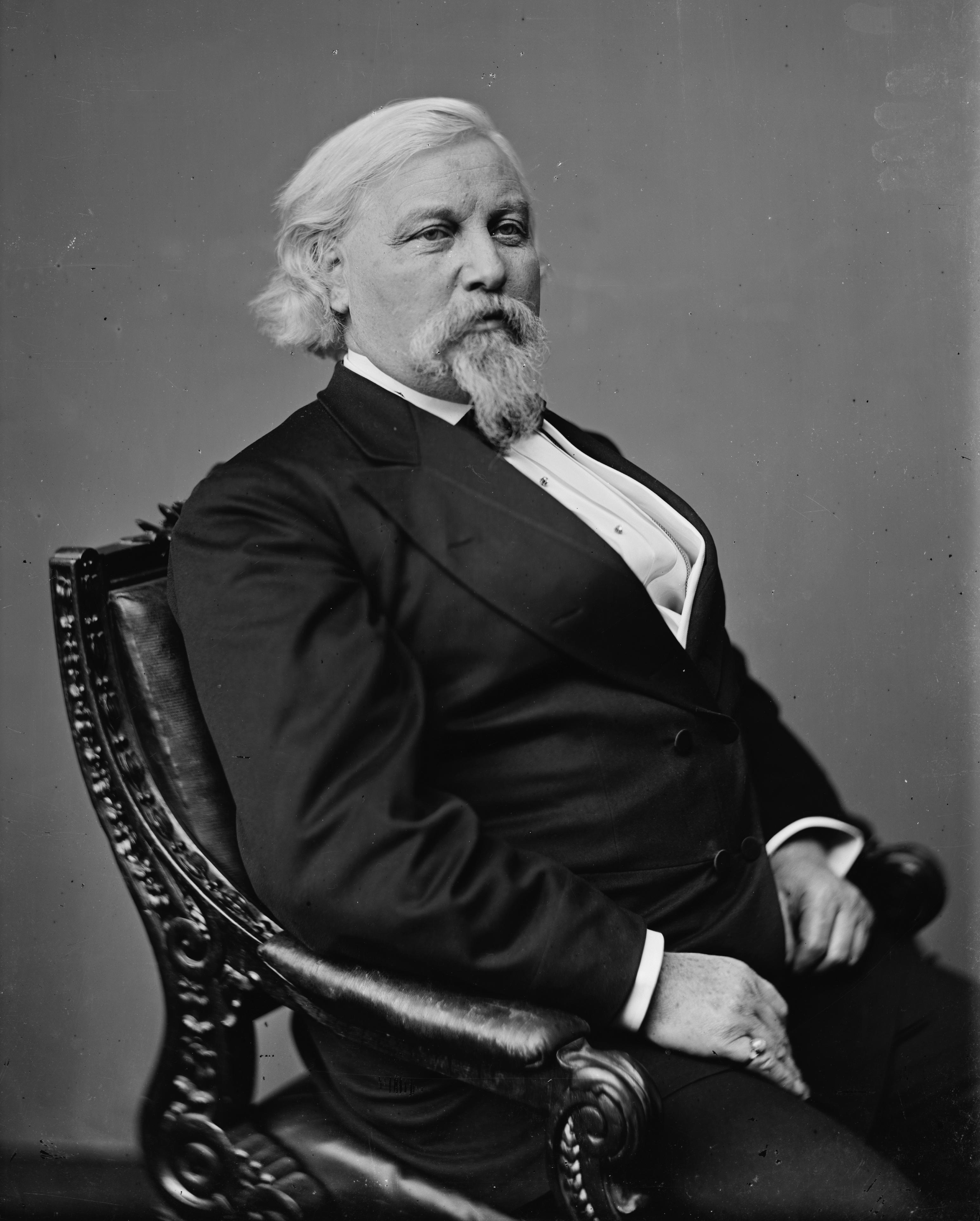
Jewell, Oregon is named after Marshall Jewell, former United States Postmaster General

Jewell was named after Marshall Jewell, United States Postmaster General from 1874–1876. A post office was established in Jewell in 1874 and closed in 1967.

== Geography ==
Jewell is situated near the Clatsop State Forest. Jewell Meadows Wildlife Area is a wildlife preserve near Jewell run by the Oregon Department of Fish and Wildlife. It is known for its Roosevelt elk.

The world's largest Bigleaf Maple, as determined by the National Register of Big Trees, with a height of 101 feet and a spread of 90 feet, was located near Jewell, but fell during a windstorm in 2011.

== Education ==
Students from grades kindergarten through twelfth grade attend Jewell School, the only school in the Jewell School District.

Clatsop County is in the boundary of Clatsop Community College.
