= List of highways numbered 454 =

The following highways are numbered 454:

== Japan ==
- Japan National Route 454

== United States ==
- Louisiana Highway 454
- Maryland Route 454
- Mississippi Highway 454
- Montana Secondary Highway 454
- New York State Route 454
- Oregon Route 454
- Pennsylvania Route 454 (former)
- Puerto Rico Highway 454
- Farm to Market Road 454

Preceded by 453	Lists of highways 454	Succeeded by 455
