= List of highways numbered 452 =

The following highways are numbered 452:

== Canada ==
- Manitoba Provincial Road 452

== Japan ==
- Japan National Route 452

== United Kingdom ==
- A452, between Leamington Spa, Warwickshire and Brownhills, Staffordshire.

== United States ==
- Maryland Route 452
- Oregon Route 452
- Pennsylvania Route 452
- Puerto Rico Highway 452
- Tennessee State Route 452

Preceded by 451	Lists of highways 452	Succeeded by 453
