= Wyoming Highway 451 =

State highway in Wyoming, United States

Wyoming Highway 451
- Oil City Road
- WYO 451 highlighted in red

Route information
- Maintained by WYDOT
- Length: 5.026 mi (8.089 km)

Major junctions
- West end: CR 36B west of Osage
- East end: US 16 in Osage

Location
- Country: United States
- State: Wyoming
- Counties: Weston

Highway system
- Wyoming State Highway System; Interstate; US; State
← WYO 450	→ WYO 487

Wyoming Highway 451 (WYO 451) is a 5.026-mile-long (8.089 km) east-west Wyoming State Road in Weston County that acts as a spur from U.S. Route 16 at Osage west to Weston County Routes 22 and 36B.

== Route description ==
Wyoming Highway 451 begins its western end west of Osage at Weston County Route 22 and County Route 36B just west of Beaver Creek in the Thunder Basin National Grassland. County Route 22 (Oil City Road) is the continuation of the roadway westward. WYO 451 heads west and ends at US 16 in the census-designated place (CDP) of Osage.

== Major intersections ==
The entire route is in Weston County.

Location	mi	km	Destinations	Notes
	0.000	0.000	CR 36B (Oil City Road)	
Osage	5.026	8.089	US 16 – Upton, Newcastle	
1.000 mi = 1.609 km; 1.000 km = 0.621 mi

== See also ==
- List of state highways in Wyoming
- List of highways numbered 451
