= List of highways numbered 453 =

The following highways are numbered 453:

== Brazil ==
- BR-453

== Canada ==
- Manitoba Provincial Road 453

== Japan ==
- Route 453 (Japan)

== United States ==
- Kentucky Route 453
- Oregon Route 453
- Pennsylvania Route 453
- Puerto Rico Highway 453

Preceded by 452	Lists of highways 453	Succeeded by 454
