= Swipp =

Social intelligence company

- Type: Private
- Industry: Social media analytics, Sentiment analysis
- Founded: 2011
- Founder: Don Thorson, Charlie Costantini, Ramani Narayan
- Headquarters: Mountain View, California, United States
- Products: Consumer applications, analytics tools, API

Swipp was a privately held company based in Mountain View, California that developed what it described as a social intelligence platform for collecting and aggregating user sentiment about topics and displaying it alongside structured reference data from Freebase.

The service allowed users to rate topics on an 11-point scale (from −5 to +5). The aggregated score and related metrics were referred to by the company as the Swipp Index.

== History ==
Swipp was founded by Don Thorson, Charlie Costantini, and Ramani Narayan, and publicly launched on January 23, 2013.

At launch, TechCrunch reported that the company had raised US$3.5 million in funding from Old Willow Partners. In April 2013, The Next Web reported that Swipp raised an additional US$2 million from the same investor, bringing the total reported funding to US$5.5 million.

In 2013, Swipp introduced a business-focused product suite branded Swipp Plus, including embeddable widgets and an API intended to let publishers and brands collect and analyze sentiment on their own websites and campaigns.

By 2026, Swipp was listed as an inactive company by the business database Tracxn.

== See also ==
- Social media analytics
- Sentiment analysis
- Big data
- Freebase
