= Adrian, Oregon =

- City
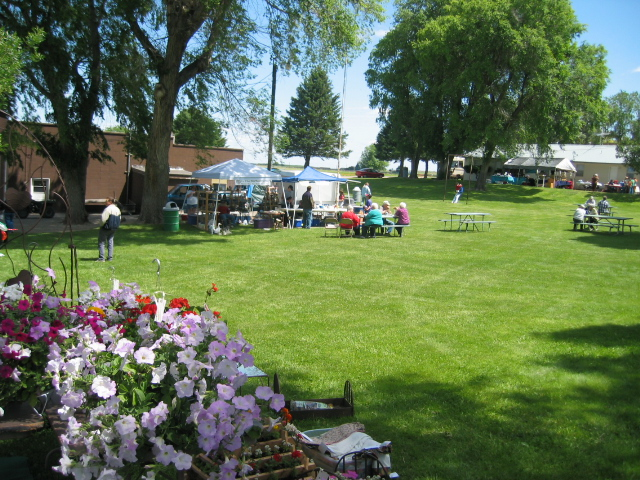
- Event at school grounds (2004)

- Location within Malheur County and Oregon
- Coordinates: 43°44′27″N 117°04′15″W
- Country: United States
- State: Oregon
- County: Malheur
- Incorporated: 1972

Government
  - Type: Council
  - Mayor: Carlos Mendoza

Area
  - Total: 0.24 sq mi (0.63 km^{2})
  - Land: 0.24 sq mi (0.63 km^{2})
  - Water: 0 sq mi (0.00 km^{2})
- Elevation: 2,234 ft (681 m)

Population (2020)
  - Total: 157
  - Density: 643.0/sq mi (248.28/km^{2})
- Time zone: UTC-7 (Mountain)
  - Summer (DST): UTC-6 (Mountain)
- ZIP code: 97901
- Area code: 541
- FIPS code: 41-00500
- GNIS feature ID: 2409664

Adrian is a city in Malheur County, Oregon, United States, along the Snake River. The population was 157 at the 2020 census. It is part of the Ontario, OR–ID Micropolitan Statistical Area.

== History ==
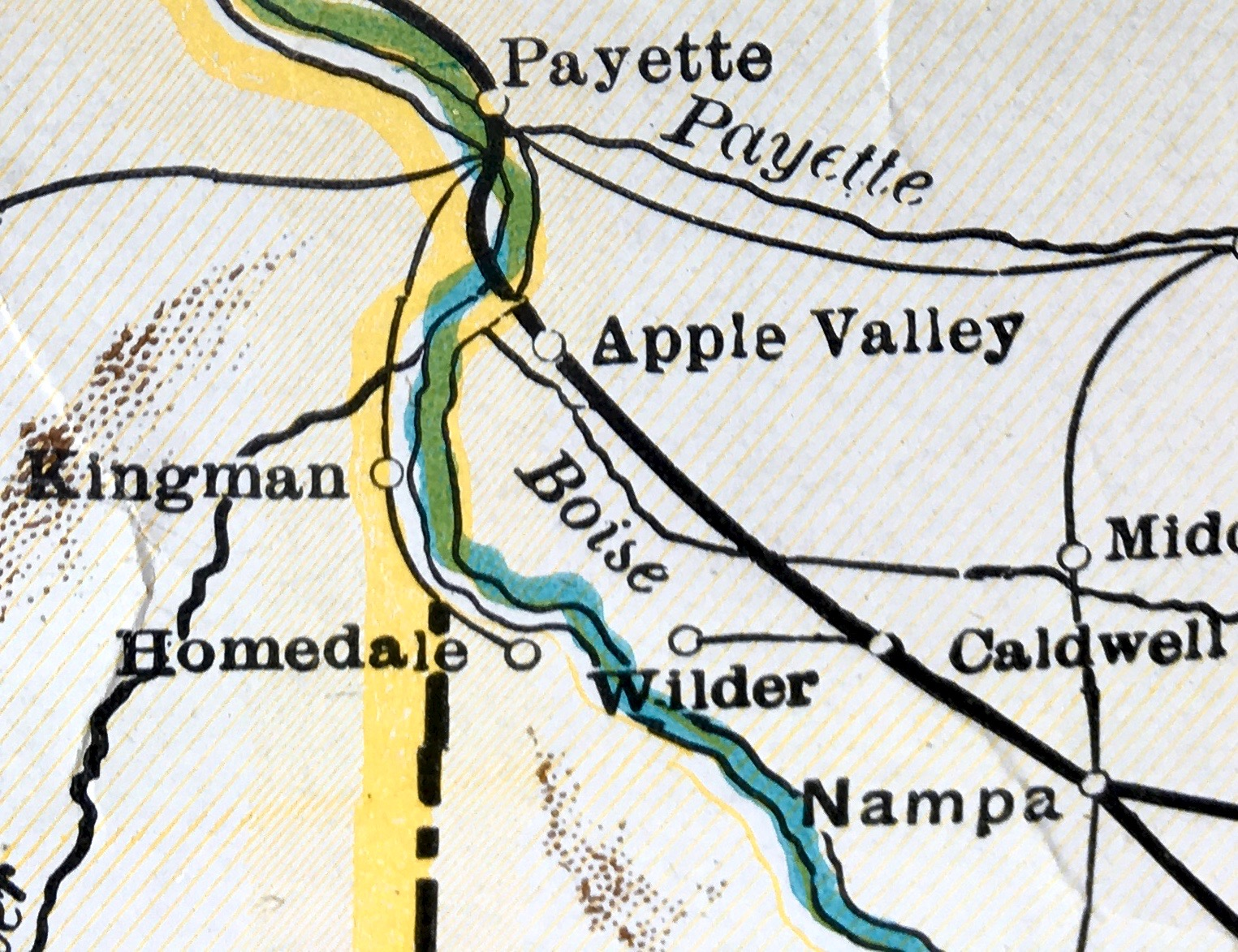
Route in 1930

In 1913, the Oregon Short Line Railroad built a branch into this part of Malheur County. There was a post office called Riverview on the east side of the Snake River and because the railroad did not want a station of the same name on the west side, the name "Adrian" was suggested by Reuben McCreary, who platted the townsite. The name was chosen to honor his birthplace, Adrian, Illinois. Riverview post office was established in 1911, but moved across the river in 1915 and the name changed to Adrian in 1919. It was previously thought that the city was named for James Adrian, a sheep rancher, but he did not arrive in the area until 1916.

Adrian is located on the Southern Alternate route of the Oregon Trail, a longer route that eliminated the need to cross the Snake River.

== Geography ==
Adrian is in eastern Malheur County, on the west side of the Snake River and 2 miles (3 km) west of the Idaho border. The Owyhee River passes 3 miles (5 km) west of Adrian and joins the Snake River 5 miles (8 km) to the north. Oregon Route 201 passes through the city as 1st Street, leading north 12 miles (19 km) to Nyssa. Homedale, Idaho, is 15 miles (24 km) to the southeast via OR-201, which becomes Idaho State Highway 19 at the state line. Roswell Road (Oregon Route 452) crosses the Snake River via the Adrian Bridge just south of the city limits.

According to the U.S. Census Bureau, the city of Adrian has a total area of 0.24 square miles (0.62 km^{2}), all land.

=== Climate ===
According to the Köppen Climate Classification system, Adrian has a semi-arid climate, abbreviated "BSk" on climate maps.

Climate data for Adrian, Oregon (Owyhee Dam), 1991–2020 normals, extremes 1935–present
Month	Jan	Feb	Mar	Apr	May	Jun	Jul	Aug	Sep	Oct	Nov	Dec	Year
Record high °F (°C)	67 (19)	70 (21)	81 (27)	92 (33)	102 (39)	110 (43)	112 (44)	111 (44)	103 (39)	93 (34)	80 (27)	70 (21)	112 (44)
Mean maximum °F (°C)	54.7 (12.6)	60.0 (15.6)	70.7 (21.5)	81.8 (27.7)	91.7 (33.2)	99.0 (37.2)	105.7 (40.9)	103.5 (39.7)	96.6 (35.9)	84.9 (29.4)	66.8 (19.3)	56.8 (13.8)	106.2 (41.2)
Mean daily maximum °F (°C)	39.8 (4.3)	47.3 (8.5)	57.4 (14.1)	64.7 (18.2)	74.6 (23.7)	83.5 (28.6)	94.8 (34.9)	93.2 (34.0)	82.5 (28.1)	67.5 (19.7)	50.4 (10.2)	40.4 (4.7)	66.3 (19.1)
Daily mean °F (°C)	30.5 (−0.8)	35.7 (2.1)	43.5 (6.4)	49.6 (9.8)	58.4 (14.7)	65.5 (18.6)	74.7 (23.7)	73.2 (22.9)	63.8 (17.7)	51.5 (10.8)	38.3 (3.5)	30.8 (−0.7)	51.3 (10.7)
Mean daily minimum °F (°C)	21.2 (−6.0)	24.1 (−4.4)	29.5 (−1.4)	34.6 (1.4)	42.2 (5.7)	47.5 (8.6)	54.5 (12.5)	53.2 (11.8)	45.1 (7.3)	35.6 (2.0)	26.1 (−3.3)	21.2 (−6.0)	36.2 (2.4)
Mean minimum °F (°C)	7.9 (−13.4)	13.8 (−10.1)	20.6 (−6.3)	25.5 (−3.6)	32.1 (0.1)	39.4 (4.1)	47.8 (8.8)	45.0 (7.2)	35.6 (2.0)	24.4 (−4.2)	14.5 (−9.7)	9.2 (−12.7)	3.2 (−16.0)
Record low °F (°C)	−22 (−30)	−13 (−25)	11 (−12)	14 (−10)	24 (−4)	34 (1)	35 (2)	35 (2)	27 (−3)	11 (−12)	−4 (−20)	−16 (−27)	−22 (−30)
Average precipitation inches (mm)	1.06 (27)	0.71 (18)	0.77 (20)	0.84 (21)	1.14 (29)	0.85 (22)	0.39 (9.9)	0.21 (5.3)	0.40 (10)	0.54 (14)	0.77 (20)	1.09 (28)	8.77 (224.2)
Average snowfall inches (cm)	2.1 (5.3)	0.6 (1.5)	0.1 (0.25)	0.0 (0.0)	0.0 (0.0)	0.0 (0.0)	0.0 (0.0)	0.0 (0.0)	0.0 (0.0)	0.0 (0.0)	0.1 (0.25)	3.1 (7.9)	6.0 (15)
Average precipitation days (≥ 0.01 in)	9.2	7.3	7.9	8.2	8.6	5.3	2.6	1.9	3.2	4.8	8.1	10.0	77.1
Average snowy days (≥ 0.1 in)	1.0	0.7	0.1	0.0	0.0	0.0	0.0	0.0	0.0	0.0	0.2	1.6	3.6
Source 1: NOAA
Source 2: National Weather Service

== Demographics ==
Historical population
Census	Pop.	Note	%±
1980	162		—
1990	131		−19.1%
2000	147		12.2%
2010	177		20.4%
2020	157		−11.3%
U.S. Decennial Census

=== 2020 census ===
As of the 2020 census, Adrian had a population of 157. The median age was 37.3 years. 24.8% of residents were under the age of 18 and 22.3% of residents were 65 years of age or older. For every 100 females there were 103.9 males, and for every 100 females age 18 and over there were 96.7 males age 18 and over.

0% of residents lived in urban areas, while 100.0% lived in rural areas.

There were 68 households in Adrian, of which 36.8% had children under the age of 18 living in them. Of all households, 33.8% were married-couple households, 19.1% were households with a male householder and no spouse or partner present, and 33.8% were households with a female householder and no spouse or partner present. About 22.1% of all households were made up of individuals and 14.7% had someone living alone who was 65 years of age or older.

There were 76 housing units, of which 10.5% were vacant. Among occupied housing units, 63.2% were owner-occupied and 36.8% were renter-occupied. The homeowner vacancy rate was <0.1% and the rental vacancy rate was 3.8%.

Racial composition as of the 2020 census
Race	Number	Percent
White	128	81.5%
Black or African American	0	0%
American Indian and Alaska Native	2	1.3%
Asian	3	1.9%
Native Hawaiian and Other Pacific Islander	0	0%
Some other race	13	8.3%
Two or more races	11	7.0%
Hispanic or Latino (of any race)	23	14.6%

=== 2010 census ===
As of the census of 2010, there were 177 people, 70 households, and 45 families residing in the city. The population density was 737.5 inhabitants per square mile (284.8/km^{2}). There were 78 housing units at an average density of 325.0 per square mile (125.5/km^{2}). The racial makeup of the city was 89.8% White, 0.6% Native American, 1.1% Asian, 2.8% from other races, and 5.6% from two or more races. Hispanic or Latino of any race were 27.1% of the population.

There were 70 households, of which 25.7% had children under the age of 18 living with them, 55.7% were married couples living together, 7.1% had a female householder with no husband present, 1.4% had a male householder with no wife present, and 35.7% were non-families. 27.1% of all households were made up of individuals, and 17.1% had someone living alone who was 65 years of age or older. The average household size was 2.53 and the average family size was 3.20.

The median age in the city was 44.4 years. 22% of residents were under the age of 18; 6.2% were between the ages of 18 and 24; 24.2% were from 25 to 44; 24.8% were from 45 to 64; and 22.6% were 65 years of age or older. The gender makeup of the city was 49.2% male and 50.8% female.

=== 2000 census ===
As of the census of 2000, there were 147 people, 59 households, and 38 families residing in the city. The population density was 597.0 inhabitants per square mile (230.5/km^{2}). There were 66 housing units at an average density of 268.0 per square mile (103.5/km^{2}). The racial makeup of the city was 85.03% White, 0.68% Native American, 10.88% from other races, and 3.40% from two or more races. Hispanic or Latino of any race were 14.97% of the population.

There were 59 households, out of which 25.4% had children under the age of 18 living with them, 52.5% were married couples living together, 11.9% had a female householder with no husband present, and 33.9% were non-families. 30.5% of all households were made up of individuals, and 13.6% had someone living alone who was 65 years of age or older. The average household size was 2.49 and the average family size was 3.21.

In the city, the population was spread out, with 25.9% under the age of 18, 9.5% from 18 to 24, 22.4% from 25 to 44, 21.8% from 45 to 64, and 20.4% who were 65 years of age or older. The median age was 38 years. For every 100 females, there were 72.9 males. For every 100 females age 18 and over, there were 84.7 males.

The median income for a household in the city was $30,000, and the median income for a family was $38,438. Males had a median income of $31,250 versus $26,667 for females. The per capita income for the city was $10,740. There were 17.8% of families and 8.0% of the population living below the poverty line, including 3.1% of under eighteens and 22.5% of those over 64.

== Education ==
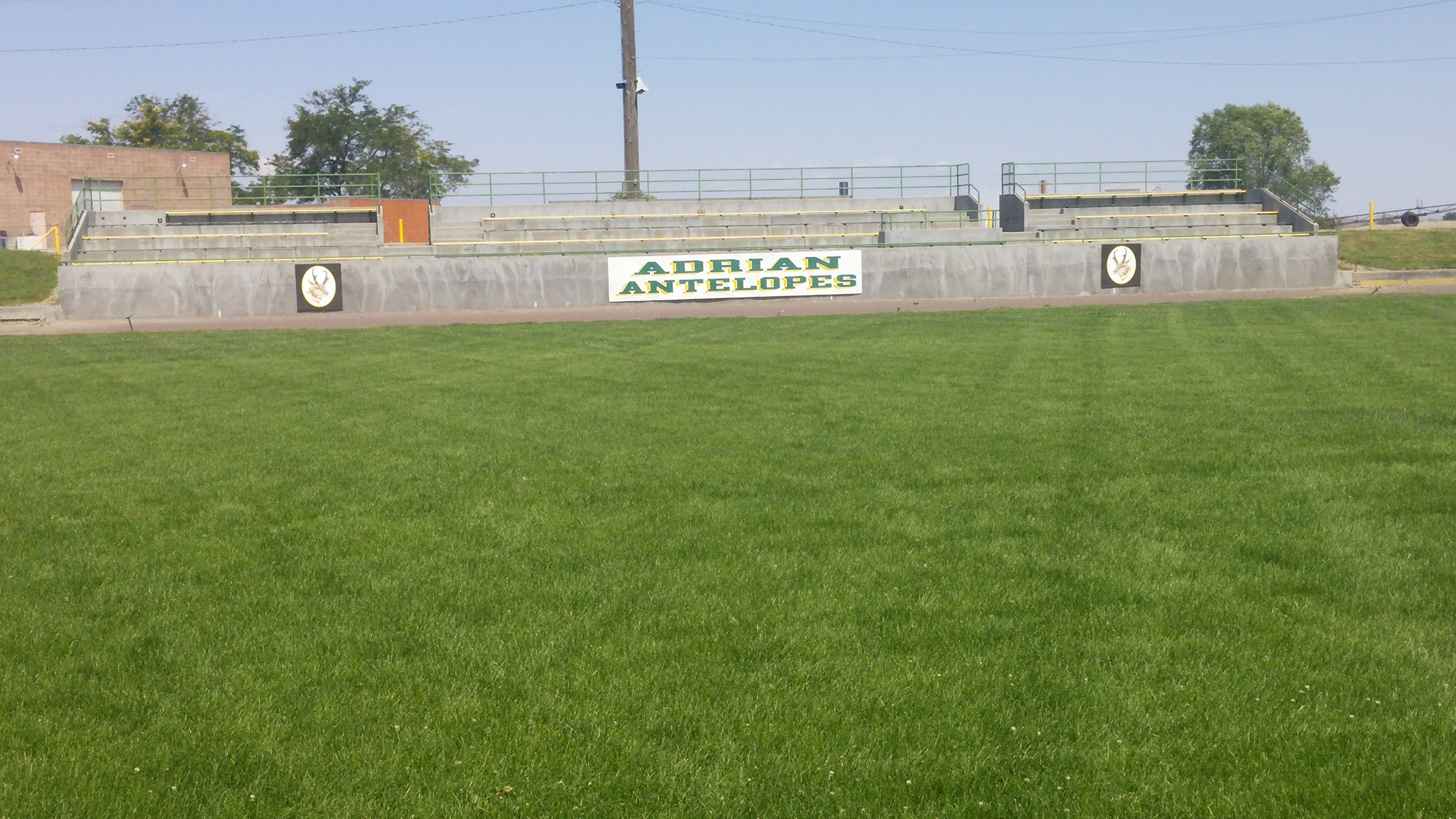
School football field (2015)

It is a part of the Adrian School District

- Adrian Elementary and Middle School
- Adrian High School

== Transportation ==
Several highways originate, terminate or pass through Adrian:

- Oregon Route 201
- Oregon Route 452
- Oregon Route 453
- Oregon Route 454
