= List of highways numbered 455 =

Route 455, or Highway 455, may refer to:

== Canada ==
- Manitoba Provincial Road 455
- New Brunswick Route 455

== Japan ==
- Japan National Route 455

== Pakistan ==
- N-455 National Highway

== United States ==
- Florida State Road 455
- Maryland Route 455 (former)
- Puerto Rico Highway 455
- Tennessee State Route 455
- Texas:
  - Texas State Highway Loop 455
  - Farm to Market Road 455

Preceded by 454	Lists of highways 455	Succeeded by 456
