= Jordan Valley High School =

Public school in Jordan Valley, Oregon, United States

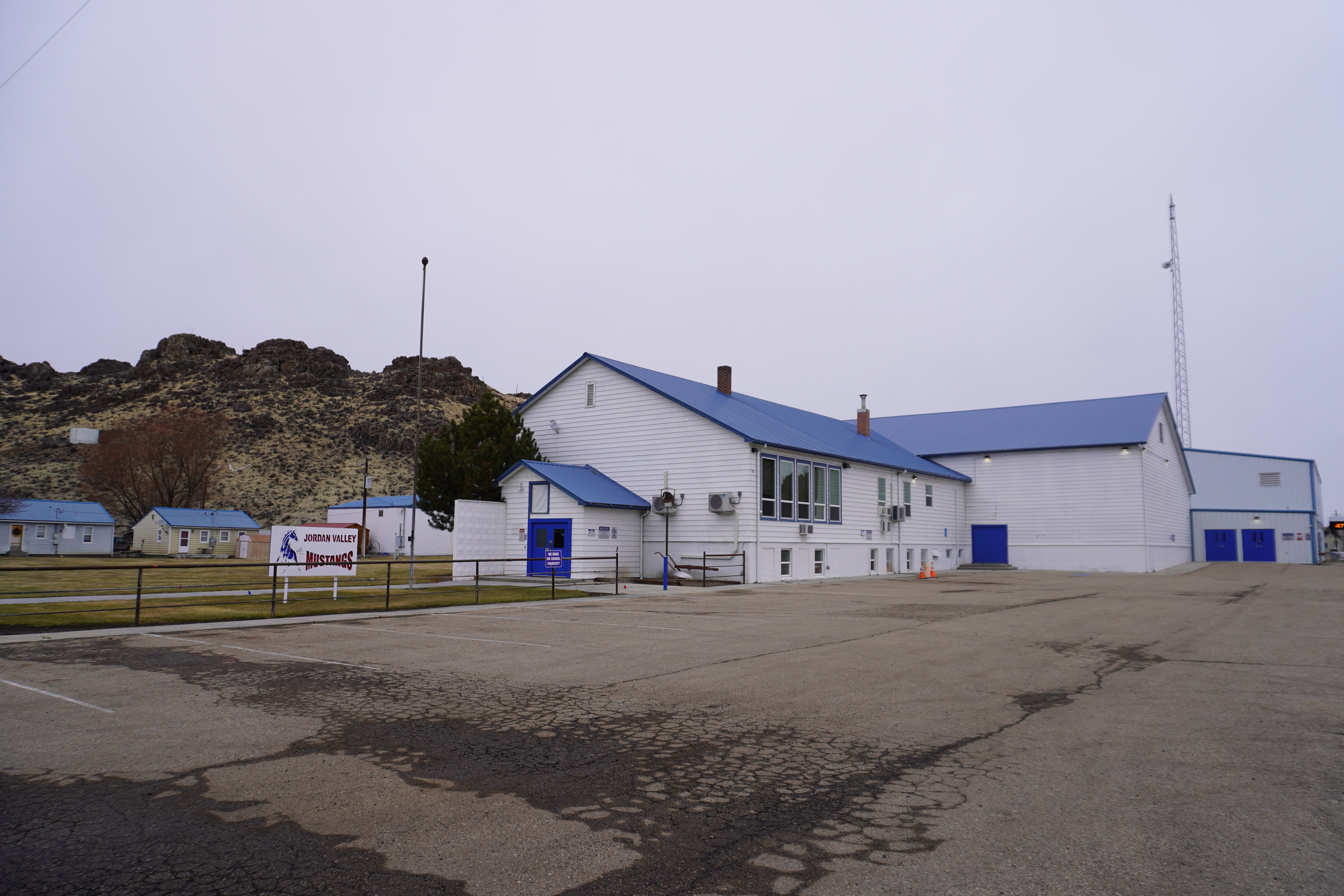

Location
- 501 Bassett Street; Jordan Valley, (Malheur County), Oregon 97910; United States; 42.977747°N 117.053688°W

Information
- Type: Public
- School district: Jordan Valley School District
- Principal: Andree Scown
- Teaching staff: 5.00 (FTE)
- Grades: 7-12
- Enrollment: 37 (2024–2025)
- Student to teacher ratio: 7.40
- Colors: Blue, white, and red
- Athletics conference: OSAA High Desert League 1A-8
- Mascot: Mustang
- Rival: Adrian High School (Oregon)
- Website: www.jordanvalley.k12.or.us

Jordan Valley High School is a public high school in Jordan Valley, Oregon, United States. It is a part of the Jordan Valley School District.

As of 1971 students in Arock typically attended high school in Jordan Valley.

== Academics ==
In 2008, 86% of the school's seniors received a high school diploma. Of seven students, six graduated and one dropped out.
