= List of highways numbered 451 =

The following highways are numbered 451:

== Canada ==
- Ontario Highway 451, commonly called the Queen Elizabeth Way.

== Japan ==
- Japan National Route 451

== Korea, South ==
- Jungbu Naeryuk Expressway Branch

== United Kingdom ==
- A451 from Stourbridge to Great Witley

== United States ==
- Florida State Road 451
- Kentucky Route 451
- Louisiana Highway 451
- Maryland Route 451 (former)
- New Mexico State Road 451
- Oregon Route 451
- Puerto Rico Highway 451
- Tennessee State Route 451
- Texas
  - Farm to Market Road 451
- Wyoming Highway 451

Preceded by 450	Lists of highways 451	Succeeded by 452
