= Adrian High School (Oregon) =

Public school in Adrian, Oregon, United States

Location
- 305 Owyhee Street; Adrian, Malheur County, Oregon 97901; United States; 43.742278°N 117.069197°W

Information
- Type: Public
- School district: Adrian School District
- Principal: Kevin Purnell
- Teaching staff: 9.10 (FTE)
- Grades: 9-12
- Enrollment: 88 (2023–2024)
- Student to teacher ratio: 9.67
- Campus: Rural
- Colors: Green, gold and white
- Athletics conference: OSAA High Desert League 1A-8
- Mascot: Antelope
- Team name: Antelopes
- Rival: Jordan Valley High School
- Website: Adrian HS website

Adrian High School is a public high school in Adrian, Oregon, United States. It enrolls about 97 students and is a part of the Adrian School District. As of 2009 the current principal is Kevin Purnell.

== Athletics ==
The Adrian Antelopes compete in the OSAA High Desert League 1A-8. The school colors are green and yellow.
