= List of highways numbered 457 =

The following highways are numbered 457:

== Brazil ==
- BR-457

== Canada ==
- Manitoba Provincial Road 457

== Japan ==
- Japan National Route 457

== United States ==
- Kentucky Route 457
- Maryland Route 457 (former)
- Puerto Rico Highway 457
- Tennessee State Route 457
- Farm to Market Road 457
- Virginia State Route 457

Preceded by 456	Lists of highways 457	Succeeded by 458
