= Don Thorson =

American politician

Member of the Wyoming House of Representatives
- In office 1979–1983

Personal details
- Born: April 30, 1933 (age 93) Osage, Wyoming, U.S.
- Party: Republican
- Occupation: rancher

J. Don Thorson (born April 30, 1933) is an American businessman and politician in the state of Wyoming. He served in the Wyoming House of Representatives from 1979 to 1983 as a member of the Republican Party.

== Early life ==
Don Thorson was born in 1933 in Osage, Wyoming. He attended the Colorado School of Mines, from which he earned a degree in geophysical engineering in 1955. After college, Thorson spent 2 years in the U.S. Army, including 1 year as a surveyor in Iran.

== Career ==
Thorson began working in his father Harry Thorson's oil and bentonite businesses in 1947. The oil business was known as Thorson Oil co. (Toco Corporation), which purchased and improved oil field operations. In 1947, the family founded Black Hills Bentonite company, which mined bentonite in the Black Hills region in Wyoming. Thorson retired in 1990.

Bentonite is typically used in drilling mud for oil and gas wells, it was later discovered that bentonite was a good substance for kitty litter due to its absorptive strength. As of 2021, Black Hills Bentonite shipped over 500,000 tons of bentonite to the Clorox. Sales to Clorox and other companies that sell kitty litter represented more than 80 percent of the company's business.

=== Political career ===
Don served two terms in the Wyoming House of Representatives, from 1979 to 1983.

== Personal life ==
Thorson is married to Lois Thorson. He is a major benefactor to the Colorado School of Mines, giving over $2 million to the school.
