= List of highways numbered 456 =

The following highways are numbered 456:

== Japan ==
- Japan National Route 456

== United States ==
- Louisiana Highway 456
- Maryland Route 456
- New Mexico State Road 456
- New York State Route 456
- Pennsylvania Route 456
- Puerto Rico Highway 456
- Farm to Market Road 456

Preceded by 455	Lists of highways 456	Succeeded by 457
