= Adrian School District =

School district in Oregon, United States

- 305 Owyhee St Adrian, Oregon, 97901

District information
- Type: Public
- Grades: PreK–12
- NCES District ID: 4101020

Students and staff
- Students: 254
- Teachers: 17.33
- Staff: 26.81
- Student–teacher ratio: 14.66

Other information
- Website: www.adriansd.org

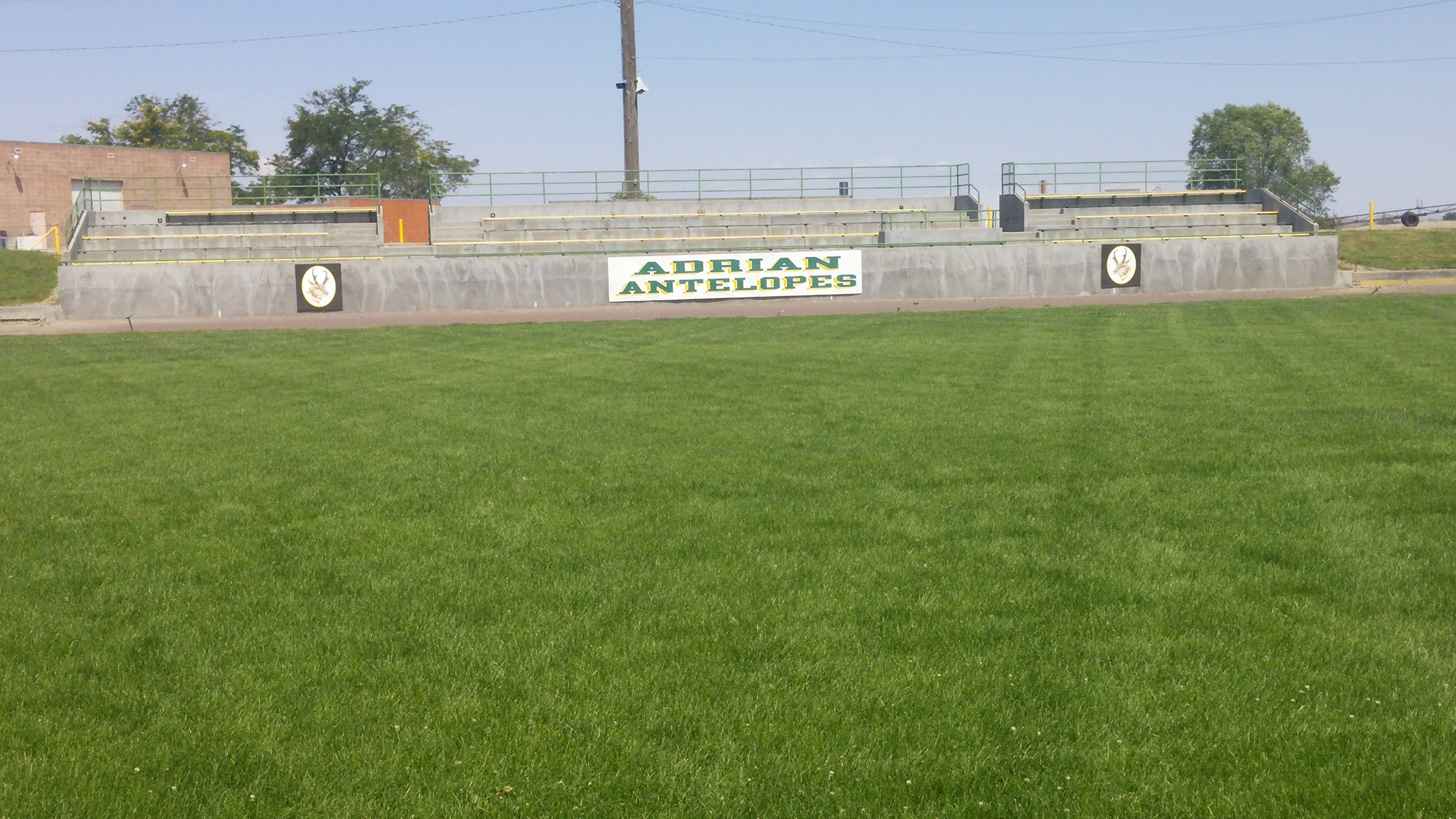
Adrian High School American football field

Adrian School District is a school district headquartered in Adrian, Oregon. The district is entirely in Malheur County.

== History ==
In 1978 the district had 378 students. In 1978 plaintiffs filed a petition to recall three members of the school board.

In August 2021, during the COVID-19 pandemic in Oregon, superintendent Kevin Purnell stated that he would enforce the state's mask mandate in the district. That month the school board removed him from his position. The vote was four in favor of firing, one against. CNN asked the district for further explanation but the district did not respond.

== Schools ==
- Adrian High School
- Adrian Elementary and Middle School
