= List of highways numbered 458 =

The following highways are numbered 458:

== Canada ==
- Manitoba Provincial Road 458

== Japan ==
- Japan National Route 458

== United States ==
- Indiana State Road 458
- Maryland Route 458
- New York State Route 458
- Pennsylvania Route 458 (former)
- Puerto Rico Highway 458
- Farm to Market Road 458

Preceded by 457	Lists of highways 458	Succeeded by 459
