= Oregon Route 453 =

State highway in Malheur County, Oregon, US

Oregon Route 453
- Route 453 highlighted in red

Route information
- Maintained by ODOT
- Length: 5.09 mi (8.19 km)
- Existed: 2003–present

Major junctions
- West end: OR 454 near Adrian
- OR 454 near Adrian
- East end: State Line Road at Idaho state line

Location
- Country: United States
- State: Oregon
- County: Malheur

Highway system
- Oregon Highways; Interstate; US; State; Named; Scenic
← OR 452	→ OR 454

Oregon Route 453 (OR 453) is an Oregon state highway running from OR 454 near Adrian to State Line Road on the Idaho state line near Adrian. OR 453 is known as the Adrian-Arena Valley Highway No. 453 (see Oregon highways and routes). It is 3.19 miles (5.13 km) long and runs northwest to southeast in a stairstep pattern, entirely within Malheur County.

OR 453 was established in 2003 as part of Oregon's project to assign route numbers to highways that previously were not assigned, and, as of July 2018, was unsigned.

== Route description ==
OR 453 begins at an intersection with OR 454 approximately one mile southeast of Adrian and heads east, south, east, crossing OR 454 again, at the Idaho state line at an intersection with State Line Road.

== History ==
OR 453 was assigned to the Adrian-Arena Valley Highway in 2003.

== Major intersections ==
The entire route is in Malheur County.

Location	mi	km	Destinations	Notes
	0.00	0.00	OR 454 – Adrian	
	2.24	3.60	OR 454	
	3.19	5.13	State Line Road	Idaho state line
1.000 mi = 1.609 km; 1.000 km = 0.621 mi
