= Oregon Route 452 =

State highway in Malheur County, Oregon, US

Oregon Route 452
- Route 452 highlighted in red

Route information
- Maintained by ODOT
- Length: 2.75 mi (4.43 km)
- Existed: 2003–present

Major junctions
- West end: OR 201 near Adrian
- OR 454 near Adrian
- East end: State Line Road at Idaho state line

Location
- Country: United States
- State: Oregon
- County: Malheur

Highway system
- Oregon Highways; Interstate; US; State; Named; Scenic
← OR 451	→ OR 453

Oregon Route 452 (OR 452) is an Oregon state highway running from OR 201 near Adrian to State Line Road at the Idaho state line. OR 452 is known as the Parma Spur No. 489 (see Oregon highways and routes). It is 2.75 miles (4.43 km) long and runs east–west, entirely within Malheur County.

OR 452 was established in 2003 as part of Oregon's project to assign route numbers to highways that previously were not assigned, and, as of July 2018, was unsigned.

== Route description ==
OR 452 begins at an intersection with OR 201 at Adrian and heads east, crossing the Snake River and intersecting OR 454 on the east side of the river. The road continues east along Roswell Road to the Idaho state line, where it ends at an intersection with State Line Road.

== History ==
OR 452 was assigned to the Parma Spur of the Succor Creek Highway in 2003.

== Major intersections ==
The entire route is in Malheur County.

Location	mi	km	Destinations	Notes
	0.00	0.00	OR 201 – Nyssa, Homedale	
	0.50	0.80	OR 454 east – Caldwell	
	2.75	4.43	State Line Road	Idaho state line
1.000 mi = 1.609 km; 1.000 km = 0.621 mi
