= Oregon Route 454 =

State highway in Malheur County, Oregon, US

Oregon Route 454
- Route 454 highlighted in red

Route information
- Maintained by ODOT
- Length: 5.09 mi (8.19 km)
- Existed: 2003–present

Major junctions
- West end: OR 452 near Adrian
- OR 453 near Adrian
- East end: Peckham Road at Idaho state line

Location
- Country: United States
- State: Oregon
- County: Malheur

Highway system
- Oregon Highways; Interstate; US; State; Named; Scenic
← OR 453	→ OR 501

Oregon Route 454 (OR 454) is an Oregon state highway running from OR 452 near Adrian to Peckham Road on the Idaho state line near Adrian. OR 454 is known as the Adrian-Caldwell Highway No. 454 (see Oregon highways and routes). It is 5.09 miles (8.19 km) long and runs east–west, entirely within Malheur County, including 0.70 miles (1.13 km) along the Idaho state line.

OR 454 was established in 2003 as part of Oregon's project to assign route numbers to highways that previously were not assigned, and, as of July 2018, was unsigned.

== Route description ==
OR 454 begins at an intersection with OR 452 approximately one mile southeast of Adrian and heads south, east, south, and east, crossing OR 453 twice, to the Idaho state line. At the state line, OR 454 turns south along State Line Road to an intersection with Peckham Road from Idaho, where it ends.

== History ==
OR 454 was assigned to the Adrian-Caldwell Highway in 2003.

== Major intersections ==
The entire route is in Malheur County.

Location	mi	km	Destinations	Notes
	0.00	0.00	OR 452 – Adrian, Parma	
	0.25	0.40	OR 453 east	
	2.48	3.99	OR 453	
	5.09	8.19	Peckham Road	Idaho state line
1.000 mi = 1.609 km; 1.000 km = 0.621 mi
