= Osage, Wyoming =

- CDP
- Location in Weston County and the state of Wyoming
- Coordinates: 43°59′06″N 104°25′27″W
- Country: United States
- State: Wyoming
- County: Weston

Area
  - Total: 1.9 sq mi (5.0 km^{2})
  - Land: 1.9 sq mi (5.0 km^{2})
  - Water: 0 sq mi (0.0 km^{2})
- Elevation: 4,321 ft (1,317 m)

Population (2020)
  - Total: 151
  - Density: 78/sq mi (30/km^{2})
- Time zone: UTC-7 (Mountain (MST))
  - Summer (DST): UTC-6 (MDT)
- ZIP code: 82723
- Area code: 307
- FIPS code: 56-58680
- GNIS feature ID: 2409002

Osage is a census-designated place (CDP) in Weston County, Wyoming, United States. The population was 151 at the 2020 census. The CDP was established by the United States Census Bureau in time for the 2000 census.

== Geography ==
Osage is located at 43°58′59″N 104°25′27″W (43.982948, -104.424145).

According to the United States Census Bureau, the CDP has a total area of 1.9 square miles (5.0 km^{2}), all land.

== Demographics ==
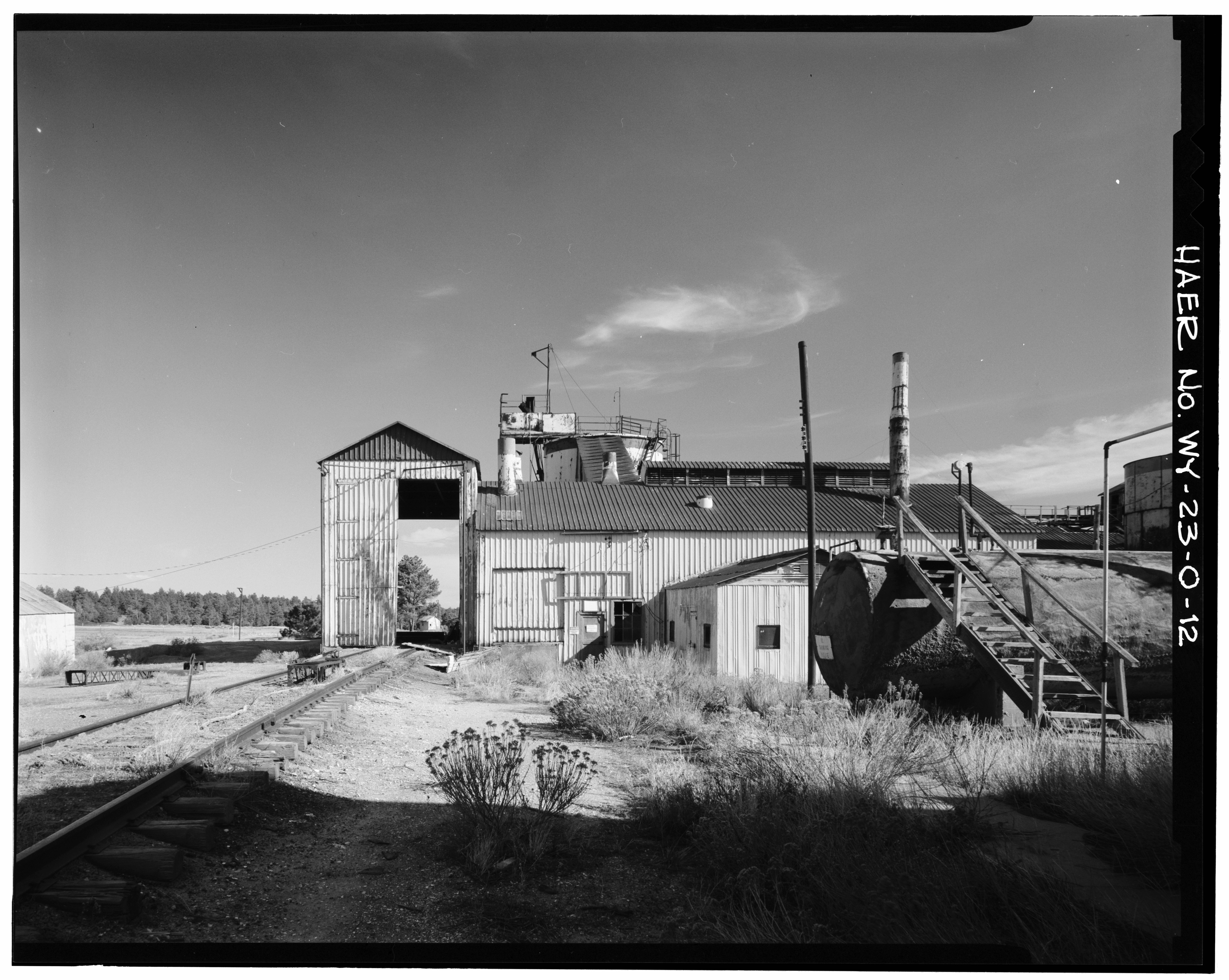
Baroid Clay Spur Bentonite Mill, Clay Spur Siding, 1989. This plant opened in 1928 and closed in the 1970s.

As of the census of 2000, there were 215 people, 101 households, and 61 families residing in the CDP. The population density was 111.0 people per square mile (42.8/km^{2}). There were 124 housing units at an average density of 64.0/sq mi (24.7/km^{2}). The racial makeup of the CDP was 96.74% White, 2.79% Native American, and 0.47% from two or more races. Hispanic or Latino of any race were 0.93% of the population.

There were 101 households, out of which 20.8% had children under the age of 18 living with them, 48.5% were married couples living together, 6.9% had a female householder with no husband present, and 39.6% were non-families. 34.7% of all households were made up of individuals, and 14.9% had someone living alone who was 65 years of age or older. The average household size was 2.08 and the average family size was 2.62.

In the CDP, the population was spread out, with 19.5% under the age of 18, 7.9% from 18 to 24, 24.7% from 25 to 44, 28.8% from 45 to 64, and 19.1% who were 65 years of age or older. The median age was 44 years. For every 100 females, there were 104.8 males. For every 100 females age 18 and over, there were 119.0 males.

The median income for a household in the CDP was $25,096, and the median income for a family was $28,000. Males had a median income of $51,250 versus $20,917 for females. The per capita income for the CDP was $24,974. About 9.5% of families and 12.1% of the population were below the poverty line, including 14.7% of those under the age of eighteen and 11.1% of those 65 or over.

== Education ==
Public education in the community of Osage is provided by Weston County School District #1.

== See also ==
- List of census-designated places in Wyoming
